= Chris Harrison (photographer) =

English photographer (born 1967)

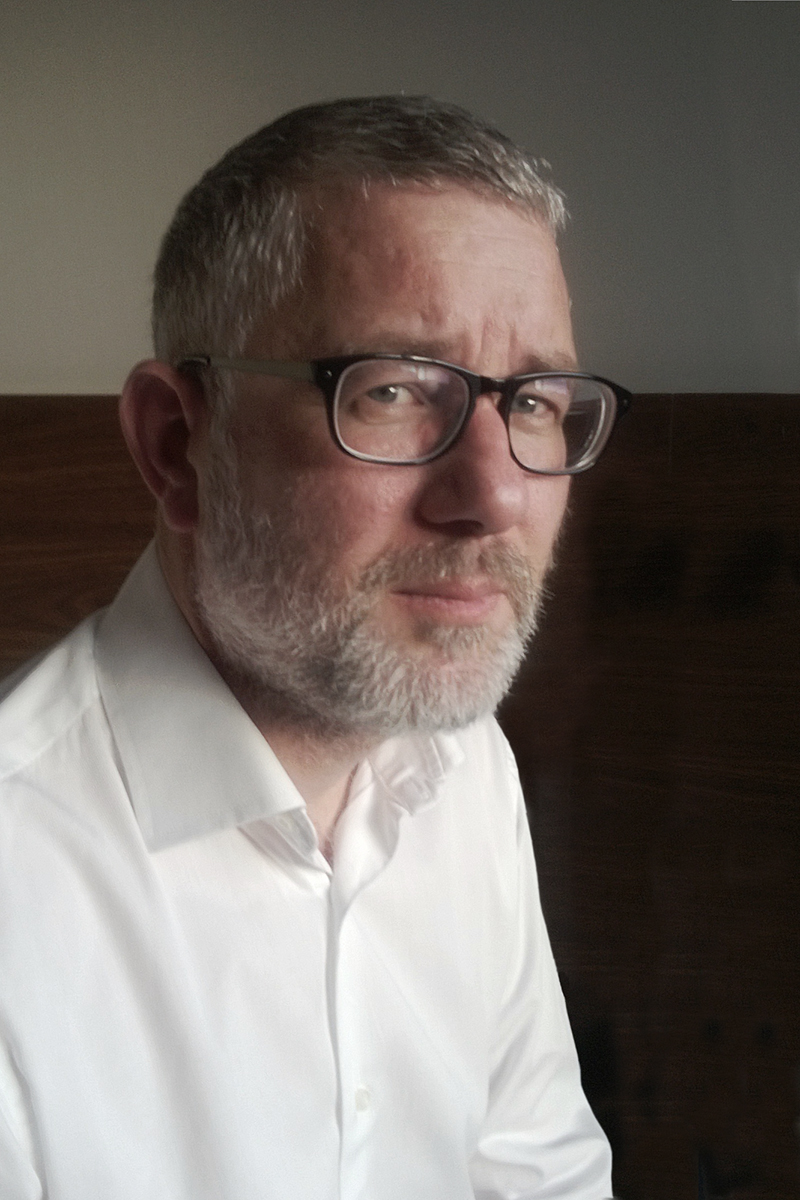
- Harrison at the private view of Copper Horses at the National Media Museum, Bradford
- Born: Christopher Matthew Harrison; 1 July 1967 (age 59); Jarrow, UK
- Education: Trent Polytechnic, The Royal College of Art
- Known for: Photography

Chris Harrison (Christopher Matthew Harrison, born 1967 in Jarrow) is an English photographer known for his work which has explored ideas of home, histories and class.

== Early life ==
Harrison grew up in Jarrow, England and attended Valley View Junior School. He left school at 15 when he became an apprentice fitter at Swan Hunter shipyard. In 1985, he took up photography and in June 1990, Harrison graduated alongside Simon Starling and Nick Waplington with an honours degree in photographic studies from Trent Polytechnic, Nottingham. It was also at this time that Harrison served in The Light Infantry (7th Durham Battalion) and qualified as a sniper.

== Works ==
=== Whatever Happened to Audra Patterson? ===
In 1991, Harrison was awarded a Northern Arts Production Award to make the work "Whatever Happened to Audra Patterson?" (Note: The series is reproduced here within Harrison's site.) Taking as his starting point his own Valley View Junior school class photo from 1978, Harrison located all but one of his former classmates and photographed them. Audra Patterson, who had hidden behind another pupil in the class photo was never found, thus giving rise to the title. Consisting of twenty-nine large scale colour portraits, the work has "the formal appearance of portraiture but the conceptual stance of documentary", and has been described as countering the tradition of grainy black and white romanticism of the working class. This work has been seen as "using documentary photography as a tool of history" and in which "there is certainly an implicit political critique…one which operates to disperse the accumulated romantic baggage which surrounds North-Eastern photography." The work was shown at the Zone Photographic Gallery Newcastle in 1992 and featured in the Independent Magazine.

=== Under the Hood. ===
In the spring of 1993, after Simon Grennan (Kartoon Kings) had seen "Whatever happened to Audra Patterson?" in the Independent magazine, Harrison was commissioned by the Viewpoint Gallery, Salford to make the work "Under the Hood". (Note: The series is reproduced here within Harrison's site.) Working closely with a group of young men on the Pendleton Estate in Salford, Harrison used the conventions of Renaissance portraiture to show a different side of young men who were seen as dangerous and marginal. The autobiographical nature of Harrison's work is apparent. When talking about the young men he photographed Harrison stated "The only thing that separates me from them is luck…I photograph to find out about myself, to find out where I'm coming from"

Described by Val Williams as "one of the few photo series to emerge from the new British colour documentary which neither satirised nor objectified a group in society, which saw itself as marginalised, bound into, and emerging from, a culture of poverty and lack of opportunity." "Under the Hood" was later shown at the 1998 Rencontres d'Arles photography festival, Arles, France. As part of the group show "Les Anglais vus par les Anglais" (trans. How the English see the English).

=== Noblesse Oblige. ===
In 1995, Photoworks commissioned Harrison to undertake the first in a series of Country Life commissions in the English town of Petworth. The resulting work, Noblesse Oblige (Note: The series is reproduced here within Harrison's site.) was put on permanent display in Leconfield Hall.

=== Sites of Memory ===
In 1995, Harrison began his long-term project, "Sites of Memory" (Note: The series is reproduced here within Harrison's site.) consisting of panoramic colour photographs of World War I memorials. The images serve to interrogate the place of memory in the contemporary landscape, By using a large format panoramic camera and a slow shutter speed Harrison shows the viewer the memorials in isolation as opposed to how we normally see them, i.e. in passing. This emphasises the act of looking and "the result is to give objects we hardly ever examine an ironic splendour." "Sites of Memory" has continued to be exhibited extensively most notably, the Imperial War Museum, London, Deutsches Historisches Museum, Berlin. and in 2007 "Sites of Memory" was exhibited at the Tate Britain, London as part of an extensive survey of British Photography curated by Val Williams and Susan Bright, "How we are: Photographing Britain from the 1840s to the Present".

In 1997, Harrison was awarded a scholarship to attend the Royal College of Art and studied alongside Clare Strand, Anne Hardy, Bettina von Zwehl, Sophy Rickett, Gareth McConnell and Alison Jackson

In 2001, Harrison moved to Oslo, Norway with his family and is a lecturer at Bilder Nordic School of Photography.

=== I Belong Jarrow ===
In 2012, Harrison published his first monograph,"I Belong Jarrow" (Note: The series is reproduced within Harrison's site.) about his hometown, Jarrow, England. In this, Harrison considers an understanding of the north and its place in photographic culture through memory and personal history. "I Belong Jarrow" consists of large format urban landscapes mixed with "an anarchic mixture of jokes, observations, and personal histories, he takes us to the heart of his own Jarra, and leaves us there to make of it what we will." Photographs from the series "I belong Jarrow" have been exhibited in England and Europe, including the MACRO Testaccio, Rome. and the Sunderland Museum and Winter Gardens, Sunderland, England.

=== Copper Horses ===
In 2012, Harrison was awarded the 16th Bradford Fellowship at the National Media Museum, Bradford, England. The Fellowship enabled mid-career photographers to develop their professional practice. Previous recipients included Paul Graham, David Hurn, Donovan Wylie and Sarah Jones. For the one year Fellowship Harrison photographed the boring machine his father had operated throughout his working life. "The result is a complex visual metaphor for his thoughts and feelings about his relationship with his father and the many people who work hard to make ends meet in British industry".

The work, titled "Copper Horses" (Note: The series is reproduced here within Harrison's site.) was exhibited at the National Media Museum in 2013. The title of the exhibition derives from the name given to a copper component for electrical substation produced by the workers in Jarrow.

For the exhibition Copper Horses, Harrison produced a set of images which show some of his father's Tools and possessions (a set of Dominoes a Micrometer, a photograph of him when he was 16 and a champion swimmer) and the dismantled parts of the machine (Vertical and Horizontal boring machine) he operated, from the age of 15 years until retirement.

== Publications ==
=== Photobooks by Harrison ===
- I Belong Jarrow. Amsterdam: Schilt Publishing, 2012. ISBN 978-9053307809. With an essay by Val Williams
- Sites of memory: war memorials at the end of the 20th century. London: The Imperial War Museum, 1997. ISBN 187-0423461. With an essay by Dr. Catherine Moriarty.
- Noblesse Oblige, The residents and interiors of the Somerset Hospital. Maidstone: Photoworks, 1996. ISBN 095-1742701. With an essay by Peter Jerrome.
- Under the Hood. Salford: Viewpoint Gallery, 1994. ISBN 090-1952311. With an essay by Val Williams.

=== Other publications ===
- Art from Contemporary Conflict. London: The Imperial War Museum, 2015. ISBN 978-1-904897-743. Edited by Sara Bevan.
- Motherland, Fotografia Festival Internazionale di Roma. X Edizione, Rome: Quodlibet, 2011. ISBN 978-8874624102 With an essay by Marc Prüst.
- How We Are: Photographing Britain from the 1840s to the Present. London: Tate Publishing, 2007. ISBN 978-1854377142. Edited by Val Williams and Susan Bright.
- Markus Brendmoe Paintings etc. Oslo, Galleri Brandstrup, 2007. ISBN 978-82-994352-2-2. With an essay by Kristin Ellefsen.
- Der Weltkrieg Ereignis und Erinnerung 1914–1918. Berlin: Deutsches Historisches Museum, 2004. ISBN 386-1021293. With an essay by Rainer Rother.
- For Evermore, Dublin: Gallery of Photography. 2000. ISBN 095-2674173. With an essay by Peter Neill.
- Un Nouveau Paysage Humain, Rencontres Internationales de la Photographie. Arles. Arles: Actes Sud, 1998. ISBN 274-2717803. With an essay by Gabriel Bauret.
- Fanny & Darko, Il mestiere di crescere. Milan, Edizione Gabriele Mazzotta, 1997. ISBN 882-0212234. With an essay by Stefano Benni.

== Exhibitions ==
=== Solo exhibitions ===
- Whatever Happened to Audra Patterson? Zone Gallery, Newcastle, England. 1992.
- Under the Hood. Viewpoint Photography Gallery, Salford, England. 1994.
- Noblesse Oblige. Leaconfield Hall, Petworth, England. 1996.
- Sites of Memory: war memorials at the end of the 20th century. The Imperial War Museum London, England. 1997.
- I Belong Jarrow. PUG, Oslo, Norway. 2012.
- Copper Horses. The National Media Museum, Bradford, England. 2013.
- Sites of Memory II. Wolverhampton Art Gallery, Wolverhampton, England. 2018.

=== Group exhibitions ===
- Fanny & Darko, The Art of Growing Up. curated by Carlo Roberti. Works by, Donna Ferrato, Lauren Greenfield, Philip Jones Griffiths, Chris Harrison, Jouko Lehtola, Sally Mann, Andrea Modica, Paolo Pellegrin. Maylight Festival. Palazzo del Podestà, Bologna, Italy. 1997.
- Les Anglais vus par les Anglais. curated by Gabriel Bauret. Works by, Anna Fox, Julian Germain, Chris Harrison, Anthony Haughey, Sarah Jones, Gordon MacDonald, Patrick McCoy, Daniel Meadows, Mark Power, Paul Reas, Paul Seawright, Hannah Starkey, Clare Strand, Nick Waplington, Donovan Wylie. Rencontres d'Arles, Arles, France. 1998.
- Face Value – Contemporary British Photo Portraits. curated by Brett Rogers. Works by, Toby Glanville, Chris Harrison, Gabriella Sancisi, Hannah Starkey, Clare Strand. British Council Gallery, Hong Kong, China. 1998.
- For Evermore. curated by Peter Neill. Works by, J.S. Cartier, Peter Cattrell, David Keith, Chris Harrison. Gallery of Photography, Dublin, Ireland. 2000.
- Der Weltkrieg 1914 – 1918, Ereignis und Erinnerung. curated by Rainer Rother. Works by (Selection), Otto Dix, Chris Harrison, Johannes Matthaeus Koelz, Käthe Kollwitz, Paul Nash, William Orpen. Deutsches Historisches Museum, Berlin, Germany. 2004.
- How we are: Photographing Britain from the 1840s to the Present. curated by Susan Bright & Val Williams. Works by, (Selection) William Henry Fox Talbot, Julia Margaret Cameron, Roger Fenton, Robert Howlett, Alvin Langdon Coburn, Cecil Beaton, Bill Brandt, Bert Hardy, Madame Yevonde, David Bailey, David Hurn, Roger Mayne, Tony Ray Jones, Jane Bown, John Davies, Anna Fox, Paul Graham, Chris Killip, Daniel Meadows, Martin Parr, Paul Reas, Paul Seawright, Homer Sykes, Tom Wood, Jason Evans, Chris Harrison, Tom Hunter, Simon Norfolk, Sarah Pickering, Nigel Shafran, Jem Southam, Clare Strand. Tate Britain, London, England. 2007.
- Motherland. curated by Marco Delogu. Works by (Selection), Julian Germain, Chris Harrison, Rob Hornstra, Rinko Kawauchi, Katharine MacDaid, Rania Matar, Tod Papageorge, Anders Petersen, Nigel Shafran, Alec Soth, Guy Tillim, Paolo Ventura. Fotografia Festival Internazionale di Roma. X Edizione, MACRO Testaccio, Rome, Italy. 2011.
- You Are The Company in Which You Keep. curated by Amanda Ritson & Carol McKay. Works by (Selection), Craig Ames, Melanie Friend, Gilbert & George, Julian Germain, Paul Graham, Chris Harrison, Daniel Meadows, Martin Parr, Simon Roberts, Jo Spence, John Stezaker, Homer Sykes. Sunderland Museum and Winter Gardens, Sunderland, England. 2013.
- Catalyst: Contemporary Art and War curated by IWM North. Works by (Selection), Paul Seawright, Peter Kennard, Cat Picton Phillipps, Chris Harrison, Willie Doherty, Ori Gersht, Steve McQueen, Edmund Clark. The Imperial War Museum North, Manchester, England. 2013.

== Collections ==
- The Victoria & Albert Museum, London, UK.
- The National Media Museum Photography Collection, Bradford, UK.
- The Imperial War Museum, London, UK.
- The British Council, UK.
- Wolverhampton Art Gallery, Wolverhampton, UK.
