= Sian Bonnell =

British photographic artist (born 1956)

- Born: 1956 (age 69–70)
- Education: Chelsea School of Art; Newcastle-upon-Tyne Polytechnic; Manchester Metropolitan University
- Known for: Photography
- Awards: Honorary Fellowship, Royal Photographic Society
- Website: www.sianbonnell.com

Sian Bonnell (born 1956) is a British photographic artist. Her work is held in the collections of the Museum of Fine Arts, Houston, and the Victoria and Albert Museum, London.

== Early life and education ==
Bonnell was born in London. She received a BA (Hons) in Fine Art, Sculpture from Chelsea School of Art (1978–81); an MA in Fine Art from Newcastle-upon-Tyne Polytechnic (1983–85); and a PhD by published work from Manchester Metropolitan University (2012–13).

== Work ==
Bonnell's practice has developed significantly over thirty years. Initially her practice was such that she "places ordinary household objects in the outdoors and, therefore, out of context. She then photographs these sculptural installations, producing imagery that is at once humorous and thought-provoking." Since then, "Bonnell's approach has developed into something she describes as 'Wilful Amateurism', which involves the fusing of sculpture and performance into something photographic."

== Publications ==
- When the Domestic Meets the Wild. 2001. With an essay by Iain Biggs. Exhibition catalogue.
- From an Elsewhere Unknown. Cardiff: Ffotogallery; London: Hirschl Contemporary Art, 2004. With essays by Mark Haworth-Booth and Mel Gooding. ISBN 978-1-872771-51-9.
- Everyday Dada. Stockport: Dewi Lewis, 2006. ISBN 978-1904587316.
- Wilful Amateur. Plymouth: Neverdone, 2025. With essays by Aliki Braine, Bonnell, Duncan Woolridge and a transcript of Bonnell in conversation with Susan Bright. Edition of 500 copies.

== Exhibitions ==
=== Solo exhibitions ===
- Kucken Theater, Art Galerie Siegen, Siegen, Germany, 2024
- Ten Seconds, Photofusion Gallery, London, 2022

=== Group exhibitions ===
- Secret Garden, Angel Row Gallery, Nottingham, 2000
- Seeing the Light: Narrascape, with Barbara Downs, Deborah Jones, Thomas Kellner, Clare Smith and Frank Yamrus, The New Art Gallery Walsall, Walsall, May–July 2003. Curated by Rhonda Wilson.
- Generations: Portraits of Holocaust Survivors, Royal Photographic Society Gallery, Bristol, January–March 2022
- Wahlverwantschaft, curated by Mirjam Veldhuis, Pictura, Groningen, Netherlands, April–May 2025

=== Exhibitions curated by Bonnell ===
- Elusive, Camberwell College of Arts, London, February–March 2011. With work by Suky Best, Karen Brett, Kathryn Faulkner, Anna Fox, Toby Glanville, Laura Guy, Fergus Heron, Jane Hilton, Juneau Projects, Uta Kogelsberger, Chrystel Lebas, Anthony Luvera, John Miles, Wendy McMurdo, Trish Morrissey, Heidi Morstang, Spencer Murphy, Magali Nougarede, Chino Otsuka, Helen Sear, Self Publish, Be Happy, Nigel Shafran, David Spero, Tansy Spinks, Eva Stenram, Clare Strand, Patricia Townsend, Steven Tynan, and Verdi Yahooda.
- '...on Making', Gdansk Gallery of Photography, National Museum, Gdańsk, Poland, March–June 2019. Curated by Bonnell and Malgorzata TarazKiewicz-Zwolicka, with work by Cheryl Newman, Eleonora Agostini, Flannery O'kafka, Fleur Olby, Lydia Goldblatt, Maryam Wahid, Phoebe Kiely and Bonnell.

== Awards ==
- 2010: Honorary Fellowship, Royal Photographic Society, Bath

== Collections ==
Bonnell's work is held in the following permanent collections:

- Museum of Fine Arts, Houston, Texas: 3 prints
- Victoria and Albert Museum, London: 12 prints
