= Sarah Pickering =

British visual artist

Sarah Pickering (born 1972) is a British visual artist working with photography and related media including 3D scanning and digital rendering, performance, appropriated objects and print. Her artist statement says she is interested in "fakes, tests, hierarchy, sci-fi, explosions, photography and gunfire." She is based in London.

Pickering's book Explosions, Fires and Public Order was published by Aperture in 2010. She has had solo exhibitions at Meessen De Clercq, Brussels (2009), Ffotogallery, Wales (2009), Museum of Contemporary Photography, Chicago (MoCP, 2010), and Durham Art Gallery (2013); and was included in Manifesta 11 in Zurich (2016). Her work is held in the collections of the Victoria and Albert Museum, London; MoCP, Chicago, IL; and North Carolina Museum of Art, Raleigh, NC.

She is a part-time Associate Professor in fine art media at the Slade School of Fine Art, University College London.

== Life and work ==
Pickering was born and raised in Durham, England, and attended Belmont Comprehensive School and Durham Sixth Form Centre. After a foundation course in art and design at Newcastle College (1991–1992), she was awarded a BA (Hons.) in photographic studies at the University of Derby (1992–1995), and a MA in photography at the Royal College of Art (2003–2005).

Her artist statement says she is interested in "fakes, tests, hierarchy, sci-fi, explosions, photography and gunfire."

Based in London, she is a part-time teaching fellow in fine art media at the Slade School of Fine Art, University College London.

"Match, 2015", was a 38 metre long public artwork installed at Castlegate Shopping Centre, Stockton-on-Tees between 2016 and 2017.

== Publications ==
=== Books by Pickering ===
- Sarah Pickering - Explosions, Fires and Public Order. Aperture, 2010. ISBN 978-1597111232.

=== Publications with contributions by Pickering ===
- Vitamin Ph, A survey of Contemporary Photography. Phaidon, 2006. ISBN 9780714856421.
- System Error: War is a Force that Gives us Meaning. Italy: Silvana, 2007. ISBN 9788836608423. Edited by L. Fusi and N. Mohaiemen.
- How We Are Photographing Britain from the 1840s to the present. London: Tate, 2007. ISBN 9781854377142. Edited by Val Williams and Susan Bright.
- In our World, New Photography in Britain. 2008. Milan: Skira. ISBN 9788861305434. Edited by Filippo Maggia. Pickering's contribution is on pages 142–151.
- Foam Album 08. Amsterdam: Foam Fotografiemuseum Amsterdam, 2008. ISBN 9789490022013.
- New Light: Jerwood Photography Awards 2003–08. Edinburgh: Portfolio Magazine, 2009. ISBN 978-0-9520608-4-0. With a foreword by Roanne Dods, an essay by Martin Barnes, and an afterword by Gloria Chalmers.
- Theatres of the Real. Antwerp: Fotomuseum Antwerp; Brighton: Photoworks, 2009. ISBN 9781903796269.
- Realtà Manipolate/Manipulating Reality. Alias, 2009. ISBN 9788896532041.
- C International Photo Magazine 09. London: Ivorypress, 2009. ISBN 9780955961335.
- Bruit De Fond/Background Noise. Je Suis une Bande de Jeunes, 2010. ISBN 9782953350616.
- Afterwards: Contemporary Photography Confronting the Past. London: Thames & Hudson, 2011. ISBN 9780500543986. Edited by Nathalie Herschdorfer.
- Public Relations. SAFLE Commission, 2012. ISBN 9780950820163.
- Hijacked III: Australia / United Kingdom. Cottesloe, WA: Big City; Heidelberg: Kehrer, 2012. ISBN 9783868282856. Exhibition catalogue.
- The Photographer's Playbook: 307 Assignments and Ideas. New York: Aperture, 2014. ISBN 978-1-59711-247-5. Edited by Gregory Halpern and Jason Fulford.
- Staging Disorder. London: Black Dog Publishing, 2015. ISBN 9781910433157. Edited by Christopher Stewart and Esther Teichmann.
- Revelations. London: Mack, 2015. Edited by Ben Burbridge. ISBN 9781907946455.

== Awards ==
- 2005: Worshipful Company of Painter-Stainers Photography Prize, Royal College of Art.
- 2005: The Photographers' Gallery Graduate Award, London.
- 2005: Jerwood Photography Award, for Public Order. Other winners were Daniel Gustav Cramer, Nina Mangalanayagam, Oliver Parker, and Luke Stephenson.
- 2008: Peter S. Reed Award, Peter S. Reed Foundation, USA.
- 2015: Refocus: the Castlegate mima Photography Prize, Middlesbrough Institute of Modern Art (mima) and Stockton-on-Tees Borough Council. A commission to produce "Match, 2015".

== Exhibitions ==
=== Solo exhibitions ===
- Fire Scene, Daniel Cooney Fine Art, New York City, 2008.
- Explosion, Meessen De Clercq, Brussels, 2009.
- Holding Fire, Ffotogallery, Wales, 2009.
- Incident Control, Museum of Contemporary Photography, Chicago, IL, 2010.
- Aim & Fire, included Celestial Objects and other works, Durham Art Gallery, Durham, England. Part of The Social: Encountering Photography festival, 2013, for which Celestial Objects was commissioned.

=== Group exhibitions ===
- Part of East International festival, Norwich, UK, 2005. Selected by Gustav Metzger.
- How We Are: Photographing Britain from the 1840s to the Present, Tate Britain, London, 2007. Curated by Val Williams and Susan Bright.
- 'Theatres of the Real' – Contemporary British Post-Documentary Photography, Fotomuseum Antwerp, Antwerp, Belgium, 2009. Curated by David Green and Joanna Lowry.
- Manipulating Reality: How Images Redefine the World, Centro di Cultura Contemporanea Strozzina, Fondazione Palazzo Strozzi, Palazzo Strozzi, Florence, Italy, 2009/10.
- Signs of a Struggle: Photography in the Wake of Postmodernism, Victoria and Albert Museum, London, 2011. Curated by Marta Weiss.
- An Orchestrated Vision: The Theater of Contemporary Photography, Saint Louis Art Museum, St. Louis, MO, 2012.
- Living in the Ruins of the Twentieth Century, UTS Gallery, University of Technology, Sydney, Australia, 2013.
- Revelations: Experiments in Photography, Media Space, Science Museum, London, 2015; National Media Museum, Bradford, 2015/16. Co-curated by Greg Hobson and Ben Burbridge.
- Professions Performing in Art, Manifesta 11, Zurich, 2016. Curated by Christian Jankowski and Francesca Gavin.

== Collections ==
Pickering's work is held in the following permanent collections:

- Victoria and Albert Museum, London: 2 prints
- Museum of Contemporary Photography, Chicago, IL: 2 prints
- North Carolina Museum of Art, Raleigh, NC: 3 prints
- LACMA, Los Angeles, USA: 1print
- Brooklyn Museum: 1 print
