= Photography and the Archive Research Centre =

Coordinates: 51.4945°N 0.1010°W

Photography and the Archive Research Centre (PARC) is a defunct organisation in London that commissioned new research into photography and culture, curated and produced exhibitions and publications, organised seminars, study days, symposia and conferences, and supervises PhD students. It is a part of University of the Arts London (UAL), is based at UAL's London College of Communication at Elephant & Castle and was founded in 2003 by Val Williams and Julian Rodriguez. PARC was closed after twenty years of operating in 2023.

According to PARC's website its activities span the history and culture of photography, particularly post-war British photography, the documentation of war and conflict, the photography of fashion and style, the visualization of the counterculture and photographers as filmmakers.

== Details ==
Val Williams is its director and Brigitte Lardinois its deputy director. The Centre has a core group of members including Tom Hunter, Alistair O'Neill, Patrick Sutherland, Wiebke Leister, Jennifer Good (née Pollard), David Moore, Paul Lowe, Corinne Silva, Paul Tebbs, Mark Ingham, Martina Caruso, Peter Cattrell, Monica Biaglioli, Anne Williams, Jananne Al-Ani, Sophy Rickett, Joanna Love and Sara Davidmann. Current staff are Corinne Silva (Research Fellow), Robin Christian (Projects Manager) and Melanie King (Research Administrator).

Many of PARC's activities are conducted in conjunction with other arts organisations and universities including University of Sunderland, National Media Museum in Bradford, Library of Birmingham, Canterbury Christ Church University, Street Level Photoworks in Glasgow, Wolverhampton Art Gallery, Ffotogallery in Cardiff, Imperial War Museum in London, Photoworks in Brighton, University of Western Ontario in Canada, Expressions of Humankind and Max Ström publishers in Stockholm, Sune Jonsson Archive in Umea, Tate Modern and University of Wales, Newport.

Two of PARC's divisions are War and Conflict Research Hub and Photography and the Contemporary Imaginary Research Hub.

PARC publishes Fieldstudy twice yearly, both in print and online, covering projects from PARC's staff, members and students.

PARC and Bloomsbury co-host the journal Photography & Culture, co-edited by Kathy Kubicki, Thy Phu and Val Williams, published three times a year by Berg.

PARC leads the Directory of Photographic Collections in the UK, a portal to UK institutions holding publicly accessible photographic collections.

== Collections held within the Photography and the Archive Research Centre ==
PARC currently houses three collections within its archive, ‘Camerawork’, ‘Photography Exhibition Posters’ and ‘The John Wall archive of the Directory of British Photographic Collections in the UK’. 'Photography Exhibition Posters' is a collection of over 300 posters dating back to the 1970s that features examples of partnerships between designers and galleries. The ‘Camerawork’ collection includes papers and objects from the Half Moon Photography Workshop and Camerawork’s early years, publication and touring exhibition programme. ‘The John Wall archive of the Directory of British Photographic Collections in the UK’ includes correspondence, research papers and file cards of this 1970s project.

== Selected exhibitions organised by PARC ==
- 2002-2005: Retrospective, Martin Parr Photoworks 1971–2000, Barbican Arts Centre, London, 2002. National Museum of Photography, Film, and Television, Bradford, 2002. Kunsthal, Rotterdam, The Netherlands, 2003. Museo Nacional Centro de Arte Reina Sofía, Madrid, 2003. National Museum of Photography, Copenhagen, 2003. Deichtorhallen, Hamburg, 2004. Works 1971–2001, Maison Européenne de la Photographie, Paris, 2005. Curated by Val Williams and organized by Brigitte Lardinois. Photographs from the 1970s to 2001 from his series Butlins by the Sea, June Street, Home Sweet Home, The Last Resort, The Cost of Living, Small World and Autoportraits.
- 2006: Magnum Ireland. Research into the Magnum Photos archive by Val Williams with Brigitte Lardinois resulting in an exhibition at the Irish Museum of Modern Art, Dublin.
- 2013: A Day In The World curated by Val Williams, Brigitte Lardinois and Marcus Eriksson for the EOH Foundation at Kulturhuset Stockholm.
- 2014: Life on the Road with photography from Tom Hunter and Dave Fawcett, films by Andrew Gaston and curated by Val Williams at London College of Communication, London.
- 2014: Daniel Meadows: Early Photographic Works. A Retrospective exhibition curated by Val Williams at the Library of Birmingham and touring to National Media Museum, Bradford; Ffotogallery, Cardiff.

== Exhibitions at PARCSpace ==
- 2014: Camerawork: Posters and Objects from the Archive.
- 2014: Ken To Be Destroyed by Sara Davidmann.
- 2014: Paper Topographies by Patrick Sutherland.
- 2014: Single Saudi Women. Photographs by Wasma Mansour.

== Publications originating at PARC ==
- Derek Ridgers: When We Were Young: Club and Street Portraits 1978–1987. Brighton: Photoworks, 2005. ISBN 978-1903796139. Photographs by Derek Ridgers, text by Val Williams. About the emergence of new style cultures in London in the late 1970s and early 1980s. (Note: The publication is reproduced here within PARC's site.)
- Anna Fox Photographs 1983–2007. Brighton: Photoworks, 2005. ISBN 978-1903796221. Edited by Val Williams. With texts by David Chandler, Val Williams, Jason Evans and Mieke Bal. (Note: The publication is reproduced here within PARC's site.)
- Magnum Ireland. London: Thames & Hudson, 2005. ISBN 9780500543030. Edited by Val Williams with Brigitte Lardinois.
- Glyndebourne, a Visual History. London: Quercus, 2009. ISBN 9781847248657. Edited by Val Williams and Brigitte Lardinois. Includes an essay by George Christie.
- The New Gypsies. Frankfurt, Germany: Prestel. By Ian McKell. (Note: The publication is reproduced here within PARC's site.) Essay by Val Williams.
  - Hardback, 2010. ISBN 978-3791345192.
  - Paperback, 2014.
- Daniel Meadows: Edited Photographs from the 70s and 80s. Brighton: Photoworks, 2011. ISBN 1-903796-46-6. Authored by Val Williams. Edited by Val Williams and Gordon MacDonald.
- I belong Jarrow. Amsterdam: Schilt, 2012. ISBN 978-9053307809. Photographs by Chris Harrison. Essay by Val Williams.
- Marjolaine Ryley: Growing up in the New Age. Hillsborough, NC: Daylight Press, 2013. ISBN 978-0-9832316-8-4. Essays by Malcolm Dickson (StreetLevel Photoworks), Brigitte Ryley, Peter Ryley, Val Williams. Additional photographs by Dave Walking.
- Martin Parr, Phaidon, 2014. ISBN 978-0714865669. Authored by Val Williams.
- Sune Jonsson: Life and Work. MaxStrom, Stockholm. Text by Val Williams

=== Fieldstudy ===
- Fieldstudy 1 London: Stories. (Note: The publication is reproduced here within PARC's site.)
- Fieldstudy 2.
- Fieldstudy 3: Charged Atmospheres. London: PARC. By Alison Merchant. (Note: The publication is reproduced here within PARC's site.)
- Fieldstudy 4: Unfolding the Tissue: The Fashion and the Archive Study Day. London: PARC. (Note: The publication is reproduced here within PARC's site.)
- Fieldstudy 5: Archives from the New British Photography London: PARC. (Note: The publication is reproduced here within PARC's site.)
- Fieldstudy 6: Private Museum. London: PARC. Researched by Val Williams and Lorna Crabbe, photographed by Laura Thomas. (Note: The publication is reproduced here within PARC's site.)
- Fieldstudy 7: Marjolaine Ryley: Résidence Astral: 1993-2005. London: PARC. Photographs taken over a twelve-year period in her grandmother's apartment in Brussels. (Note: The publication is reproduced here within PARC's site.)
- Fieldstudy 8: MAP Reading. London: PARC. Catalogue of work from LCC's MA in Photography, 2006 (Note: The publication is reproduced here within PARC's site.)
- Fieldstudy 10: Visible London: PARC. (Note: The publication is reproduced here within PARC's site.)
- Fieldstudy 11: Lovers, Liars & Laughter. London: PARC by Wiebke Leister. (Note: The publication is reproduced here within PARC's site.)
- Fieldstudy 12: Fashion & Food London: PARC. (Note: The publication is reproduced here within PARC's site.)
- Fieldstudy 14: Daniel Meadows, Butlin's by the Sea, 1972. London: PARC. (Note: The publication is reproduced here within PARC's site.)
- Fieldstudy 15: Growing Up in the New Age. London: PARC, 2011. By Val Williams, Marjolaine Ryley (University of Sunderland) and Dave Walking. Features photographs by Dave Walking and essays by Val Williams, Marjolaine Ryley, Zoe Lippett and Malcolm Dickson. (Note: The publication is reproduced here within PARC's site.)
- Fieldstudy 16: From a Distance. London: PARC. Photographs by Paul Reas.
- Fieldstudy 19: Ken. To be Destroyed. London: PARC, 2013. (Note: The publication is reproduced here within PARC's site.)
