= Danny Flynn (printer) =

British artist

- Education: Bradford Art College; Hounslow Borough College
- Known for: Printing, design, typography
- Awards: D&AD Award Graphic Design 2007; 1st prize, Institute of Bookbinders Award for Craftmanship 2009; 1st prize, The Society of Bookbinders Biennial Competition + The Portnal Award 2001; 1st prize, International Snow-Fest Sculpting Competition 02
- Website: G511ERY website Facebook page

Danny Flynn (born 4 August 1964), is a D&AD award-winning designer and printer, specialising in limited edition book design and illustration, and letterpress and screen-printing. His work in design, typography and printing led to him working in post-production design for the opening title sequence of the Hollywood film Gladiator.

Born and educated in Bradford, Flynn received a diploma in graphic design and advertising from Bradford College Art School. He went on to study at Hounslow Borough College, London, studying graphic design and typography. After first working as a graphic designer, he further developed his interest in traditional printing methods.

== Collaborations ==
Flynn also works with artists from other disciplines, such as book binder Eri Funazaki, milliner Flora McLean of (House of Flora) and photographer Derek Ridgers.

=== Eri Funazaki ===
Flynn's series of books created in partnership with the Japanese bookbinder Eri Funazaki are included in private and public collections such as The Tate Gallery, The Yale Collection of British Art, The School of the Art Institute of Chicago, Joan Flasch Artists' Book Collection, and The Miniature Book Collection, New York.

The work with Funazaki has led to three awards:

1. 2nd Prize. Complete Book Category, in the Society of Bookbinders International Competition 2011.
2. 1st Prize. IBAT Award for Craftsmanship, in The Society of Bookbinders International Competition: Winner of the Complete Book Category, 2009.
3. 1st Prize. The Society of Bookbinders Biennial Bookbinding Competition and winner of The Portnal Award, 2001.

Work by Eri Funazaki and Danny Flynn:

=== House Of Flora ===
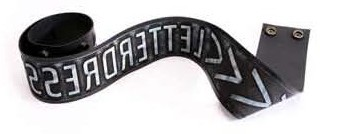

For the designer Flora McLean at House of Flora, Flynn laser-cut typography onto rubber for garments and accessories for a piece titled Dress No.2, which proved popular at the 2009 London Fashion Week. The designs were shown in Vogue and a film of the work, Letterhead, can be seen on the Vogue website. An interview with Flynn for Print Week described the event:

With the help of Danny Flynn of Astonish Me Press, [Flora] McLean created fashion accessories and jewelry inspired by letterpress printing – with a twist! The designs could also be used to print with and came with their own inking pots so the wearer could quite literally print on the go. Rubber embossed belts turned into rollers along with laser cut roller handbags and cuffs bearing laser-cut text. – Print Week, 2010

=== Derek Ridgers – Every Bodies Enemies ===
In 2010 Flynn made a series of screen-prints using the rock star and film maker portraits by British photographer Derek Ridgers and the text of writer Marcus Georgio. The prints, featuring subjects such as Nick Cave, David Lynch, Keith Richards, Elvis Costello, Frank Zappa and John Lee Hooker, used various everyday powders – sugar, salt, custard and raspberry powder, etc. – and the exhibition, Every Bodies Enemies was held at Ketchum Pleon as part of their Art@Ketchum Pleon project.

Examples of the work produced for the Every Bodies Enemies gallery show:

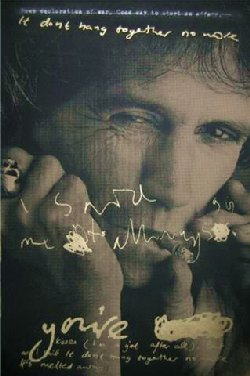

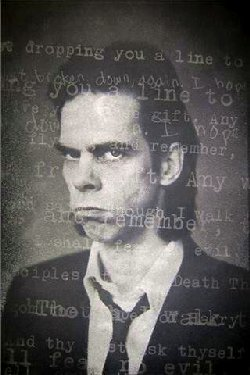

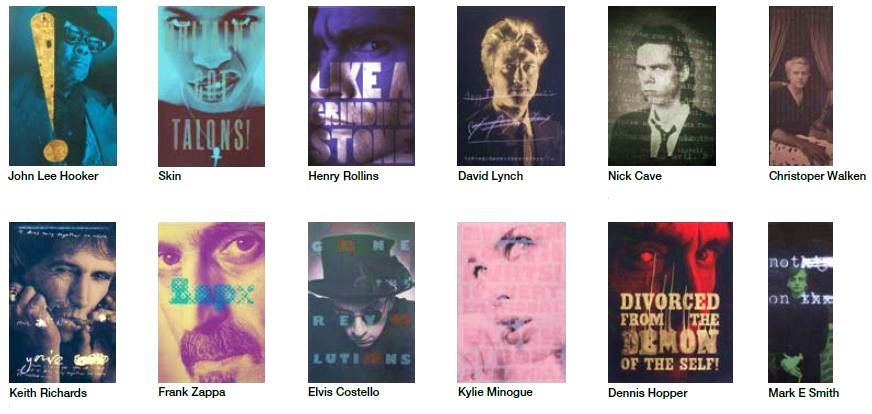

== Gallery ==
Flynn is owner of an art gallery named 'G511ERY' in Tottenham, North London. The gallery has held exhibitions by artists John Lee Bird, Brede Korsmo, Paradox Paul and Maya Malfatti, and a performance by the dancer Mirjam Sögner.

== Works as a playwright ==
Flynn's debut short plays 'Theatre Dogs' and 'Monologue' were performed at an Open Ealing event on 29 September 2012, directed by Anthony Shrubsall and with a cast consisting of the actors Gregory Cox, Ben Owara, Robin Miller and Francesca Wild. The two pieces were performed alongside the works of Liam O'Grady and Wally Sewell.

The plays were subsequently performed again in 2012 and 2013 at the Drayton Court theatre in London.

== Snow sculpting ==
Flynn captained the British ice sculpting team three times, during 2002 and 2004, in The International Snow Sculpture Championship and The International Snowfest Sculpting Competition in the US and Canada, respectively – being awarded the 1st prize in 2002 Snowfest competition in Ontario for the sculpture entitled 'Urgh'.

Danny Flynn captaining the award-winning British snow sculpture team in Canada:

== Awards ==
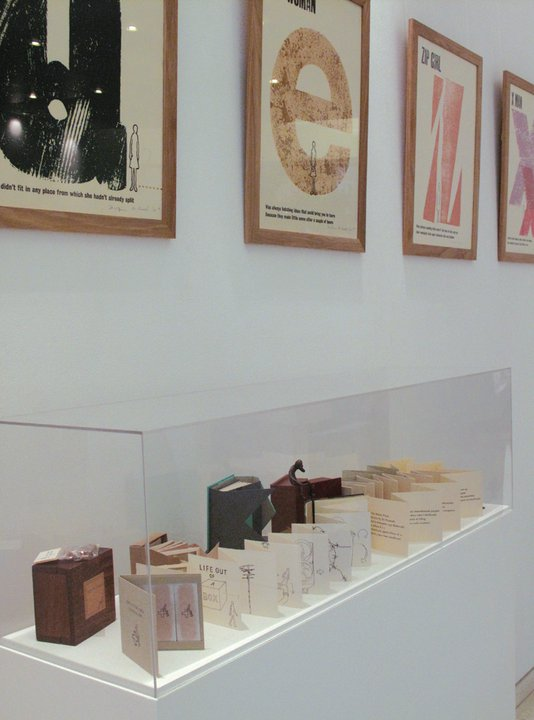
Danny Flynn & Eri Funazaki exhibition

- 2001 – 1st Prize. With Eri Funazaki. Work title: 'Life in a Box'. Winner of the Complete Book Category, The Society of Bookbinders Biennial Bookbinding Competition and winner of The Portnal Award.
- 2002 – 1st place. Sculpture title: 'Urgh'. Captain of 3 snow sculptors representing Great Britain in The International Snowfest Sculpting Competition, Sarnia, Ontario, Canada. Carving from an 8 foot x 8 foot block of compressed snow.
- 2007 – D&AD Award. Work title: 'Block'. Graphic Design Posters category. Letterpress print for a Stella Artois national advertising campaign. Commissioned by Lowe, London.
- 2009 – 1st Prize. With Eri Funazaki. Work title: '28 Characters'. IBAT Award for Craftsmanship, in The Society of International Bookbinders Competition. Professional category.
- 2011 – 2nd Prize. With Eri Funazaki. Work title: 'Finger Print'. Complete Book Award, in The Society of Bookbinders International Competition. Professional category.

== Exhibitions ==
Flynn's work has been exhibited internationally since 1995 from America to Japan, in London, New York, Tokyo and San Francisco, and in galleries such as The Tate, The Saatchi Gallery, The Barbican Centre, MoDA, Chaucer Centre and Ketchum Pleon. His work has also been exhibited in public spaces such as Waterstones and Selfridges.

Selected exhibitions

- AL-MUTANNABBI STREET BROADSIDES – tour 2010–2011. A coalition of printmakers whose work commemorated the bombing of the Al-Mutanabbi bookselling district in Baghdad. Danny Flynn/Nick Smart piece: The Past Is Our Culture/ Remember The Future.
- FUNAZAKI & FLYNN – Ketchum Pleon, Shoreditch, UK. An exhibition of the handbound and handprinted books of Eri Funazaki and Danny Flynn. 18 November 2010 – 7 January 2011.
- EVERY BODIES ENEMIES – Ketchum Pleon, Shoreditch, UK. 12 Screen-prints of rock stars and film makers using the photographs of Derek Ridgers. Sponsor: G. F Smith papers. 2010
- DENTAID CAMPAIGN FOR WORLD WIDE SMILES – The Saatchi Gallery, London, UK. An exhibition of works donated by artists in aid of Dentaid. Launch November 2010.
- LIFE OUT OF A BOX – Flow Gallery, Notting Hill, UK. With Eri Funzaki. The 6th Designer Bookbinders exhibition. 2010.
- UNTITLED – Coalition Headquarters, San Francisco, US. Letterpress printed broadside commemorating the bombing on al-Mutanabbi Street on 5 March 2007. 2009.
- A MECURIAL DESIRE – Flow Gallery, Notting Hill, UK. With Eri Funzaki. The 5th Designer Bookbinders exhibition. 2009.
- 28 CHARACTERS – Flow Gallery, Notting Hill, UK. With Eri Funzaki. The 4th Designer Bookbinders exhibition. 2008.
- STEPPING OUT OF A BOX – Flow Gallery, Notting Hill, UK. With Eri Funzaki. The 3rd Designer Bookbinders exhibition. 2007.
- LIFE IN A BOX – Flow Gallery, Notting Hill, UK. With Eri Funzaki. The 2nd Designer Bookbinders exhibition. 2005.
- UNTITLED – Selfridges, Oxford Circus, UK. With Eri Funazaki. 2005

== Books ==
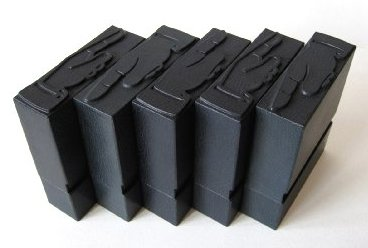
Print blocks by Danny Flynn for the works Finger Print by Danny Flynn and Eri Funazaki

Selected books by Danny Flynn

- One and Two – by Danny Flynn with Eri Funazaki. A fine bound artists' book. 2011. Edition of 5.
- Finger Print- by Danny Flynn with Eri Funazaki. A fine bound artists' book. 2011. Edition of 5.
- Life Out of a Box – by Danny Flynn with Eri Funazaki. A fine bound artists' book. 2010. Edition of 5.
- A Mercurial Desire – by Danny Flynn with Eri Funazaki. A fine bound artists' book. Including bronze figure. 2009. Edition of 5. 2009
- 28 Characters – by Danny Flynn with Eri Funazaki. A fine hinge bound artists' book. Including bronze figure. 2008. Edition of 5
- Stepping Out of a Box – by Danny Flynn with Eri Funazaki. A non-adhesive binding. Boxed. 2007 . Edition of 15.
- Lino Coots (boxed) – by Danny Flynn with Eri Funazaki. 2005. Edition of 3.
- Ink – by Danny Flynn with Eri Funazaki. 2001. Edition of 65.
- Life in a Box (Artists' Box Edition) – by Danny Flynn with Eri Funazaki. 2001. Edition: 5.
- Life in a Box (Fine Bound Edition) – by Danny Flynn with Eri Funazaki. A fine bound artists' book. With 12 mono coloured zinc plate etchings. 2001. Edition of 5.
- Smoke Signals – by Danny Flynn. A live performance video filmed by the Barbican Arts Centre, London. 1999.
- The Hill / La Colina – by Danny Flynn with Anne Davies. 1999. Edition of 50.
- The First Daisy on the Lawn – by Danny Flynn. 1997. Edition of 28.
- Untitled, Volume 2. – by Danny Flynn. 1997. Edition: 100.
- Untitled, Volume 1. – by Danny Flynn. 1996. Edition: 100.
- Untitled – by Danny Flynn. 1993. Edition: 60.
- The Bed and ‘It’ Collapsed – by Danny Flynn with Abigail Edgar. 1991. 1st Edition: 80. / 2nd Edition: 40.

Selected books featuring the work of Danny Flynn

- Pataphysics – 1st English translation of Jean Baudrillard’s 1960s paper on Pataphysics. Letterpress printed pamphlet. 2005. Edition: 144. (25 signed by Baudrillard).
- Prickling Counterpoints, Selected Poetry and Prose – by David Russell. Lithographic printed paperback. 1997. Edition: 1000.
- Alphabet Soup, The Recipe for Success – Artists’ book mailer letterpress printed in salt and pepper and tomato soup powder. Commissioned by Alphabet Soup typographic designers, Clerkenwell, London. 1996. Edition: approximately: 80
- Words of a Wandering Pen – Poetry by Henry Harper Amos. Lithographic and letterpress printed booklet. 1996. Edition: 500.
- Public Dreams – The Sculpture Work of Jeff Higley. Letterpress printed booklet. 1994. Edition: 50
- A History of The Lord Nelson – Illustrations by Abigail Edgar. Text by J. A. Heginbottom. Lithographic and letterpress printed booklet of local history. 1992. Edition: 1000.

== Commercial work ==
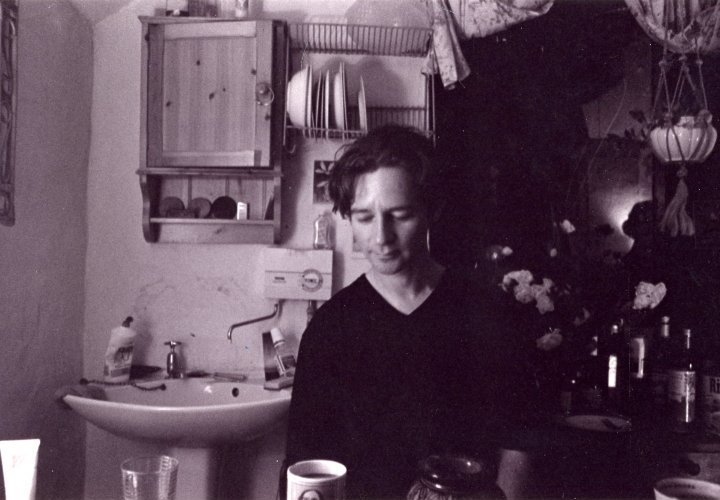
Danny Flynn in print room, England

- 2009 – Letterdress No.2 – with Flora McLean of House of Flora. Design consultation and manufacturing laser-cut typographic printable rubber fashion accessories for House of Flora.
- 2008 – Peeterman 4% Larger – Commissioned letterpress print by Lowe, London for a Stella Artois national advertising campaign. UK.
- 2007 – Block – Commissioned letterpress print from laser-cut blocks for a Stella Artois national advertising campaign. Lowe, London. UK.
- 2002 – Ice sculpting sessions – with Croydon College art students. Exhibited at Croydon Clocktower, South London. UK.
- 2001 – Mural painting. Commissioned by Groundwork Landscape Architects, West London. UK.
- 2000 – Mural painting. Incorporating 3d sculptures. Commissioned by The Mill House Ecology Center, South London. UK.
- 2000 – Drawings and stencil cut designs for spray-painting. As part of a team building exercise for Haymarket Publishing. Commissioned Groundwork Landscape West London. UK.
- 1999 – Ridley Scott's film Gladiator. Assistant to Nick Livesy in post production for opening and title of the movie. DreamWorks & Universal Pictures. UK & US.

== Research ==
Flynn has presented talks and workshops at the London College of Communication, Middlesex University (as Visiting Lecturer in Graphic Design, Fashion, Design, Styling and Promotion, Illustration and Interior Architecture; Visiting Lecturer in letterpress; Research Associate in Bookworks, Letterpress and Print), Hastings College of Art & Design (as Visiting Lecturer in Art and Design), and London Metropolitan University (as Visiting Lecturer in Fine Art).; and lectured in the UK and Germany for The Children's Trust Charity, Central Saint Martins College of Art and Design, The Art Workers Guild, Middlesex University and The International Conference on Technology in Berlin.

Flynn's research has been published in the UK, the US and Germany in The International Journal of the Arts in Society; Bound and Lettered, Artists' Books, Bookbinding, Papercraft and Calligraphy; The Blue Notebook; (Note: The Blue Notebook: Journal for artists' books ISSN 1751-1720 (online) ISSN 1751-1712 (print)) Designer Bookbinders Contemporary Book Arts Newsletter of The Designer Bookbinders; and Book Arts Newsletter.

== Research articles ==
- 2010 – (Berlin). A research paper published in The International Journal of the Arts in Society.
- 2009 – (UK). Interview by Printweek.com 20 March. Article title: On Canvas. Letterpress print proves popular at London Fashion Week. Print Week
- 2009 – (US). Published article in Bound and Lettered, Artists' Books, Bookbinding, Papercraft and Calligraphy. Volume 7. No 4. Pages 16–22. John Neal Books
- 2008 – (UK). Published refereed journal: The Blue Notebook. Volume 3. No 1. October. Pages 38–45. Article title: Laser Cutting With Character.
  ISSN 1751-1712 (Print). ISSN 1751-1720 (Online).
- 2008 – (UK). Published article in Designer Bookbinders Contemporary Book Arts Newsletter of The Designer Bookbinders, Spring No 142. Pages 8–9.
  Feature article title: Laser Cutting and Letterpress.
- 2007 – (UK). Book Arts Newsletter, No 38. November/December. UWE Bristol, School of Creative Arts, Department of Art and Design.
  ISSN 1754-9078 (Print). ISSN 1754-9086 (Online).
- 2005 – (UK). Book Arts Newsletter. No 20. August. Wooden Type Survey. Book Arts
  .
