= Rhonda Wilson =

Rhonda Wilson may refer to:

- Rhonda Wilson (photographer) (1953–2014), British photographer
- Rhonda Wilson (actress), Australian actress and director
- Rhonda Wilson (Neighbours), short term soap character
