= Clare Strand =

British conceptual photographer

Clare Strand (born 1973) is a British conceptual photographer based in Brighton and Hove in the UK. She makes, as David Campany puts it, "black-and-white photographs that would be equally at home in an art gallery, the offices of a scientific institute, or the archive of a dark cult. ... They look like evidence, but of what we cannot know."

Strand's work has been published in the books Clare Strand: Photoworks Monograph (2009), Skirts (2013) and Girl Plays with Snake (2016). She has had solo exhibitions at Museum Folkwang in Germany, National Museum, Kraków and Centre Photographique d'Ile de France. She has been included in group exhibitions at National Media Museum in Bradford, and at the Victoria and Albert Museum (V&A), Media Space and Barbican Centre in London. Her work is held in the collections of the Museum of Modern Art, New York; Centre Georges Pompidou, Paris; the V&A; San Francisco Museum of Modern Art; New York Library; Arts Council England and the British Council. In 2019 she was nominated for the Deutsche Börse Photography Foundation Prize and awarded an Honorary Fellowship of the Royal Photographic Society.

She is one half of creative partnership MacDonaldStrand with her husband Gordon MacDonald.

== Life and work ==
Strand was born in Brighton, England, in 1973. She studied at North East Surrey College of Technology, University of Brighton (1992–1995), and at Royal College of Art, London (1996–1998), where she gained an MA in fine-art photography.

Strand's first exhibition was as part of the touring exhibition, The Dead, curated by Val Williams and Greg Hobson, which opened at the National Museum of Photography, Film & Television in 1995. It included work by various photographers including Nobuyoshi Araki, Krass Clement, Donigan Cumming, Hans Danuser, Andres Serrano, Nick Waplington. Her first major solo exhibition was Clare Strand Photography and Video at Museum Folkwang, Essen, Germany in 2009. In 2011 she had her first major London solo exhibition, Sleight, at Brancolini Grimaldi, the gallery that represented her at the time. Strand's significant proportion of the group exhibition Signs of a Struggle: Photography in the Wake of Postmodernism, which took its title from Strand's piece, at the Victoria and Albert Museum, London, in 2010 was singled out for praise in Aesthetica and The Independent.

She is one half of creative partnership MacDonaldStrand with her husband Gordon MacDonald. Around 2000–2002, they made commercial work for Sleazenation, contributing photographs for stories. In 2012 they self-published Bad Things Happen To Good People and Most Popular Of All Time.

David Campany has written that "she is a photographer whose primary context is the medium itself and the habits of seeing, knowing, and picturing that have formed around it." Strand says that involves "investigating its origins, uses – and limitations". Sean O'Hagan, writing in The Guardian, has said "there is always something odd – in a good way – about Strand's work. That oddity rests in the tension between her often personal, always playful take on conceptualism and her wilfully old-fashioned methods". Her work has been described as surreal, having a "paranormal, scientific atmosphere", a narrative mystery, inspired by magic (illusion) and vernacular photography.

Strand's most notable series are Signs Of A Struggle (2002), Gone Astray Details (2002/3), Gone Astray Portraits (2002/3), The Betterment Room - Devices For Measuring Achievement (2005), Conjurations (2007-9), Skirts (2011), 10 Least Most Wanted (2011), Spaceland/Flatland (2012), The Happenstance Generator (2015), and The Entropy Pendulum and Out Put. (2015).

== Publications ==
=== Books of works by Strand ===
- Clare Strand: Photoworks Monograph. Monograph series. Edited by Rebecca Drew. Brighton and Hove: Photoworks; Göttingen: Steidl, 2009. ISBN 978-3-86521-838-4. Contains Strand's series Gone Astray Portraits, Gone Astray Details, The Betterment Room – Devices for Measuring Achievement, Signs of a Struggle, Unseen Agents and Conjurations. With a foreword by Rebecca Drew and texts by David Chandler ("Clare Strand: Vanity Fair"), de:Ute Eskildsen ("News from Photography"), Ian Jeffery ("Securing the Invisible in the Photography of Clare Strand") and a transcript of a conversation between Strand and Chris Mullen.
- Skirts. London: Gost, 2013. ISBN 978-0-9574272-3-5. With an introduction by Philippe Starck. Edition of 500 copies.
- Girl Plays with Snake. London: Mack, 2016. ISBN 9781910164556.

=== Other publications by Strand ===
- Gone Astray. Newspaper format. Self-published, 2003.
- Negatives for Fun with Clare Strand's Photography. Angle 24. Oslo, Norway: Multipress, 2019. Edition of 360 copies.

=== Publications with Gordon MacDonald ===
- Bad Things Happen To Good People. Newspaper format. Self-published, 2012. Edition of 50 copies.
- Most Popular Of All Time. Self-published, 2012. Edition of 200 copies.

=== Books with contributions by Strand ===
- The Dead. By Val Williams and Greg Hobson, Bradford: National Museum of Photography, Film & Television, 1995. ISBN 0-948489-15-4. With essays by Williams ("Secret Places"), Hobson ("A Horrible Exhibition"), Elizabeth Edwards ("Seeing How Others Die") and Thomas Lynch ("Embalming Father"); and photographs by Strand and others. Published to accompany a touring exhibition starting at the National Museum of Photography, Film & Television, October 1995 – January 1996, curated by Williams and Hobson.
- Look at Me: Fashion and Photography in Britain 1960-1997. Edited by Val Williams. London: British Council, 1998. ISBN 978-0863553899. Catalogue of a touring exhibition.
- Imago 98. Salamanca: Universidad de Salamanca, Spain, 1998. ISBN 9788474819489.
- Fieldstudy 1. London: Photography and the Archive Research Centre (PARC), 2003. (Note: The publication is reproduced here within PARC's site.)
- Vitamin Ph: New Perspectives in Photography. London: Phaidon, 2006. ISBN 9780714846569. With an introduction by T.J. Demos. With work by Strand and 120 others.
- How We Are: Photographing Britain from the 1840s to the Present. Edited by Val Williams and Susan Bright. London: Tate, 2007. ISBN 978-1-85437-714-2.
- Between Times: Instants, Intervals, Durations. Madrid: La Fabrica, 2010. ISBN 978-84-92841-44-8. Catalogue of an exhibition curated by Sérgio Mah. With essays by Sérgio Mah ("Between Times: Instants, Intervals, Durations") and Jacinto Lageira ("Tempus Fugit"); writings about each photographer by Mah, José Gomez Isla and Javier Chavarria; and photographs by Strand (from Signs of a Struggle) and others.
- Im Verborgenen: Zeitgenössische Fotografie aus Leipzig und International = In the Hidden: Contemporary Photography from Leipzig and International. F/Stop Vol 4. Leipzig: Zentrum für Zeitgenössische Fotografie (ZZF); Heidelberg, Germany: Kehrer, 2010. ISBN 978-3-86828-186-6. Catalogue of the fourth F/stop International Photography Festival. With texts in English and German by Kristin Dittrich, Axel Hütte, Julia Mauga, and Jule Hillgärtner, interviews, work from 45 photographers including examples of Strand's The Betterment Room and Gone Astray Details, and texts about each photographer.
- A Medium In Transition: Producing and Collecting Photography. Heidelberg, Germany: Kehrer, 2012. ISBN 978-3868283570.
- Miesiąc Fotografii w Krakowie 2014: Re:Search 15.05–15.06 = Krakow Photomonth Festival 2014: Re:Search 15.05–15.06. Kraków: Fundacja Sztuk Wizualnych, 2014. ISBN 9788362978212. Polish and English text. Includes a chapter on Strand, and a transcript of a conversation between her and Clément Chéroux.
- (Mis) Understanding Photography: Werks und Manifeste. = Works and Manifestos. Essen, Germany: Museum Folkwang; Göttingen: Steidl, 2014. ISBN 978-3869307640. Photographs by various photographers, short texts, and introductions to each photographer written by themselves, in German. Includes examples of Strand's Gone Astray Portraits and The Betterment Room - Devices For Measuring Achievement. Catalogue of an exhibition held at Museum Folkwang.
- The Art of Fashion Photography. By Patrick Remy. Munich: Prestel, 2014. ISBN 978-3791348407.
- Photography Now!. Tokyo: Amana, 2014. ISBN 9784907519025. Text in Japanese and English. Published to coincide with an exhibition at IMA Concept Store, Tokyo.
- Une Histoire. Art Architecture Design des Années 1980 à nos Jours. Paris: Centre Georges Pompidou, 2014. Edited by Christine Macel. Catalogue of an exhibition held at Centre Georges Pompidou, Paris. Text in French.
- European Portrait Photography Since 1990. Brussels: Centre for Fine Arts; Munich: Prestel, 2015. ISBN 978-3791349275.
- Revelations: Experiments in Photography. Edited by Benedict Burbridge. London: Mack; Media Space, 2015. ISBN 978-1907946455. With a foreword by Greg Hobson, an introduction by Burbridge, and essays by Ian Jeffrey, Kelley Wilder, de:Gottfried Jäger, and Burbridge. Published to coincide with an exhibition at Media Space, London. "A series of comprehensive essays of how scientific photography has influenced modern art and continues to influence contemporary art".

=== Books with sections about Strand ===
- Images Recalled: 3. Fotofestival Mannheim Ludwigshafen Heidelberg = Bilder auf Abruf: 3. Fotofestival Mannheim Ludwigshafen Heidelberg. Heidelberg, Germany: Kehrer, 2009. ISBN 9783868280753. Catalogue of the third de:Fotofestival Mannheim Ludwigshafen Heidelberg. Texts in German and English. Includes a description of Strand's Unseen Agents, 2006–2007 by Heide Häusler and two pages of photographs by Strand.
- Thinking Pars Pro Toto: Studien zur zeitgenässischen Kunst. By Doris Schumacher-Chilla. Oberhausen, Germany: Athena, 2013. ISBN 978-3-89896-526-2. Includes a chapter, "Einfuhrung in das Werk von Clare Strand anlässlich ihrer Austellung Taschenspielertrick im Forum für Fotografie, Köln (Eröffnung am 15.4.2012)".

== Exhibitions ==
=== Solo exhibitions ===
- Clare Strand Recent Works, Fotografins Hus, Stockholm, Sweden, 2008.
- Clare Strand Photography and Video, Museum Folkwang, Essen, Germany, 2009; Museum of Photography, Braunschweig, Germany. Included everything published in Clare Strand: Photoworks Monograph (2009).
- Sleight, Brancolini Grimaldi (now Grimaldi Gavin), London, 2011.
- Further Reading, National Museum, Kraków, Poland, May–August 2014. Part of Krakow Photomonth.
- Getting Better and Worse at the Same Time, Grimaldi Gavin, London, April–June 2015. Included The Entropy Pendulum and Out Put. and other work.
- The Discrete Channel with Noise, Centre Photographique d'Ile de France (CPIF), Pontault-Combault, Paris, April–July 2018. Photography, paintings (made during a research residency in 2017 at the CPIF), machinery and sound installation.

=== Exhibitions with others and at festivals ===
- The Dead, National Museum of Photography, Film & Television, Bradford, UK, October 1995 – January 1996, then toured. Curated by Val Williams and Greg Hobson.
- 'Theatres of the Real' – Contemporary British Post-Documentary Photography, Fotomuseum Antwerp, Antwerp, Belgium, June–September 2009. Curated by David Green and Joanna Lowry.
- Between Times: Instants, Intervals, Durations, the es:Teatro Fernán Gómez, Madrid during PHotoEspaña, June–July 2010; it:Museo d'arte della provincia di Nuoro, Sardinia, Italy, October 2010 – January 2011; Centro de Arte La Regenta, Las Palmas, Spain, February–April 2011. With photographs by Strand from Signs of a Struggle. Curated by Sérgio Mah.
- Signs of a Struggle: Photography in the Wake of Postmodernism, Victoria and Albert Museum, London, August–November 2011. Included Strand's Signs of a Struggle. Curated by Marta Vice.
- Spaceland/Flatland, Skirts, and video, Rencontres d'Arles, Arles, France, 2013. Selection for the Discovery Award.
- (Mis) Understanding Photography: Werks und Manifeste, Museum Folkwang, Essen, Germany, June–August 2014. Photographs by various photographers including examples of Strand's Gone Astray Portraits and The Betterment Room - Devices For Measuring Achievement.
- Revelations: Experiments in Photography, Media Space, Science Museum, London, March–September 2015; National Media Museum, Bradford, UK, November 2015 – February 2016. Co-curated by Greg Hobson and Ben Burbridge.
- All That Hoopla: The Fairest Game at the Fair, Unseen Photo Fair, Amsterdam, September 2016; LhGWR Gallery, the Hague, Netherlands, September–November 2016
- Masculinities: Liberation Through Photography, Barbican Centre, London, July–August 2020. Included Strand's Men Only Tower.
- “A Boring Grey Jumper and an Overcomplicated Top, Two-Person Show with Steffi Klenz, Filet, London, September – October 2022

== Awards ==
- 1998: Deutsche Bank Awards for Creative Enterprises
- 2019: Nominated, Deutsche Börse Photography Foundation Prize 2020, London for her exhibition The Discrete Channel with Noise at PHotoEspaña, Madrid. The other nominations were Mark Neville, Mohamed Bourouissa and Anton Kusters.
- 2019: Honorary Fellowship of the Royal Photographic Society, Bristol.

== Collections ==
Strand's work is held in the following public collections:

- Arts Council England
- British Council
- Centre Georges Pompidou, Paris holds her 10 Least Most Wanted works displayed in a cabinet
- Museum of Modern Art (MoMA), New York, holds her Skirts series
- New York Library, New York, holds her Skirts series
- San Francisco Museum of Modern Art, San Francisco, California: Skirts
- Victoria and Albert Museum, London holds her Signs of a Struggle series

== Residencies ==
- London College of Printing, University of the Arts London, London, 2001–2002. One year residency to produce her Gone Astray series.
- University of Sunderland International Photography Research Network (IPRN) artist-in-residence at Museum Folkwang, Essen, Germany, 2003–2004, to produce The Betterment Room – Devices For Measuring Achievement
