= BD1 Gallery =

Gallery in Bradford, West Yorkshire, England

Coordinates: 53.7941°N 1.7564°W

- Established: 2017; 9 years ago
- Director: Sam Brown
- Website: www.bd1.gallery

BD1 Gallery is an art gallery in the city of Bradford, West Yorkshire, that opened in 2017 with an exhibition of the work of music photographer Lawrence Watson, showcasing portraits from Watson's 30-plus year career, including images of Oasis, David Bowie, Morrissey, Liam Gallagher, Noel Gallagher, Paul Weller, Snoop Dogg, Issac Hayes, Run DMC and George Clinton.

== Founder ==
The BD1 Gallery was founded by Sam Brown, a cinematographer/DP in the film industry for 25-years who has worked on music videos for Madonna (Give It 2 Me with Pharrell Williams), Foals, The Last Shadow Puppets, Moby, Scott Walker, and Dirty Pretty Things. Brown is a former Bradford resident who moved from London back to Bradford to open the BD1 Gallery.

== Exhibitions ==
The debut show at the gallery in 2017 was 'The World Is Yours', a photographic retrospective by Lawrence Watson, who has worked as a music and popular culture photographer for over thirty years, shooting for the NME as well as album covers for Paul Weller and Noel Gallagher. 'The World Is Yours' exhibition had previously toured and been shown in Edinburgh and London.

== Location ==
The gallery is located on Godwin Street in Bradford city centre, on a site that had been unused for 12 years before being taken over by Brown as a gallery location. The BD1 Gallery is one of three centrally located art galleries in Bradford along with the Impressions Gallery and the Gallery II (at the University of Bradford).
