= Steffi Klenz =

German visual artist

- Citizenship: German
- Occupations: Visual artist, academic
- Website: www.steffiklenz.co.uk

Steffi Klenz is a German-born London-based visual artist and academic. She is currently a Reader in Photography at the University for the Creative Arts and leads the MA Fine Art course at the university's Canterbury campus.

== Artistic career ==
Klenz investigates the photographic medium and its methods of production. She employs techniques including digital imagery created with medium-format cameras, smartphones, microfilm devices, and digital hand-scanners. Her work also encompasses large-format analogue photography and camera-less darkroom processes, and often incorporates archival photographic material. Klenz’s work centres on the study of built spaces, examining how place and spatial relations are understood. While she frequently photographs structures and urban settings, her approach differs from traditional architectural photography, aiming to challenge customary forms of architectural depiction.

Klenz has presented her work in London at institutions such as the British Museum, the Wellcome Collection, the Camden Art Centre, and the Royal Academy of Arts, as well as at the Royal Scottish Academy in Edinburgh. Outside the UK, Klenz’s work has been exhibited in venues including the Museum of Contemporary Art Taipei, Fotomuseum Antwerp, the Alicante Museum of Contemporary Art, the Los Angeles Center for Digital Art, the Phoenix Art Museum, the Fine Art Museum in Luleå, the Kämp Galleria, Künstlerhaus Bethanien in Berlin, Kunstverein Ludwigshafen, the Museum Künstlerkolonie in Darmstadt, The New Art Gallery Walsall, and CICA Museum in Gimpo, South Korea. She held a solo exhibition within the framework of the 2024 European Capital of Culture in Bodø, Norway, participated in the International Biennale of Contemporary Art in Uzbekistan (2024), and was featured in the 16th East Wing Biennial at The Courtauld Institute of Art, London (2025–2027). Her work has been included in a number of international exhibitions, among them the audio-visual presentation Frames: Projecting International Photography at the Centre for Contemporary Art in Glasgow during the 2014 Glasgow International Festival for Contemporary Art; the 2015 Look-Light audio-visual display at Tate Liverpool; a British Council exhibition held at the Romantso Cultural Centre in Athens in conjunction with Documenta in 2017; the Biennale for Contemporary Photography in Germany in 2020; the International Biennale for Photography in Belo Horizonte, Brazil, in 2021; the Biennale for Electronic Language and Technology in São Paulo, Brazil, in 2022; and the Tokyo Biennale in 2023.

Klenz’s work has included commissions for the Unseen Photography Festival in Amsterdam (2013), the Rights of Passage Commission at the Venice Biennale (2015), and the BBC East Tower Project in London (2017). She completed the Tunbridge Wells Museum and Cultural Quarter Commission in 2018 and the London Borough of Culture Project between 2019 and 2022. In 2022 she exhibited at the London Festival of Architecture and launched her first permanent public artwork, Tensed Muscles, in London.

Klenz is a participant in Out of the Metropolis – Art Exchange across Borders, a collaborative European project supported by the European Union and organized in partnership with the Finnish Museum of Photography, NŌUA in Norway, and Double Dummy in France.

== Exhibitions ==
=== Solo ===
- 2024: An Alluring Maquette, NOUA, Bodø, Norway
- 2022: Concrete Thinking, Sid Motion Gallery, London
- 2021: Tensed Muscles, Camden Art Centre, London
- 2019: Paradise can make itself scarce, Filet, London
- 2018: Staffages, Tunbridge Wells Museum & Art Gallery, Tunbridge Wells
- 2017: Stagings of A Room, London Gallery West, London
- 2017: SETTINGS, RESETTINGS, REPEAT, Kehrer Galerie, Berlin, Germany
- 2015: Plotting Spaces, St.Albans Museum+Gallery, University of Hertfordshire Arts + Culture, Hertfordshire
- 2010: Nummianus, Street Level Photoworks, Glasgow
- 2009: Nummianus, The New Art Gallery, Walsall
- 2007: Nummianus, Wendt + Friedmann Galerie, Berlin, Germany
- 2006: A Scape, Focal Point Gallery, Southend-on-Sea
- 2006: Nonsuch, Photofusion, London

=== Group ===
- 2025: Art Is 2025, CICA Museum, Gimpo, South Korea
- 2024: Steffi Klenz and Clare Strand, Spam New Media Festival 2024, Georgetown Steam Plant, Seattle
- 2022: Documents from the Edges of Conflict, James Hockey Gallery, Farnham
- 2022: A Boring Grey Jumper and an Overcomplicated Top, two-person show with Clare Strand, Filet, London
- 2020: Beg Steal and Borrow, Bermondsey Project Space, London
- 2019: Tennis Elephant, Galerie Pankow, Berlin
- 2019: Living with Buildings, Wellcome Collection, London
- 2018: Powerful Tides: 400 years of Chatham and the Sea, Chatham Historic Dockyard, Chatham
- 2014: 2014 Frames: Projecting International Photography as part of 2014 Glasgow International Festival for Contemporary Art, Centre for Contemporary Arts, Glasgow

== Publications ==
- Klenz, Steffi (2009). Polo: Bound for Passaic. New Art Gallery Walsall. ISBN 978-0-946652-96-9.
- Klenz, Steffi (2016). He only feels the black and white of it, Berlin Wall 14-07-1973. Mörel. ISBN 978-1-907071-54-6
- Klenz, Steffi (2018). So to Speak. Mörel. ISBN 9781907071706
