= 78-87 London Youth =

Photography book by Derek Ridgers

- Author: Derek Ridgers
- Language: English
- Subject: Youth culture in London
- Published: Bologna
- Publisher: Damiana
- Publication date: 2013
- Publication place: Italy
- Media type: Hardcover
- Pages: 160
- ISBN: 978-88-6208-359-1

78-87 London Youth is a 2012 photography book by British photographer Derek Ridgers.

== Synopsis ==
The book is a collection of photographs of young Londoners taken by the photographer from 1978 to 1988. It especially focuses on the alternative youth scene, from punk through to the birth of acid house music. It showcases the creativity and individuality of the young.

== Reception ==
In The Observer Sean O'Hagan described the work as a "visual anthropology of a bygone era" and wrote that "hopefully this is only the first instalment in a much bigger series devoted to Ridgers's invaluable archive of London youth culture in these decades". The work was also reviewed in The Daily Telegraph.
