= Hannah Starkey =

British photographer (born 1971)

Hannah Starkey (born 1971) is a British photographer who specializes in staged settings of women in city environments, based in London. In 2019 she was awarded an Honorary Fellowship of the Royal Photographic Society.

Hannah Starkey: In Real Life showed at The Hepworth Wakefield in April 2023.

== Biography ==
Born in Belfast, Starkey studied photography and film at Napier University, Edinburgh (1992–1995) and photography at the Royal College of Art, London (1996–1997). She now lives and works in London.

Her more recent images have an almost theatrical character, often depicting women in staged settings– for example, with a Coca-Cola in a pub or inside a public lavatory. She describes her work as "explorations of everyday experiences and observations of inner city life from a female perspective."

== Publications ==
- Hannah Starkey: Moments in the Modern World - Photographic Works, 1997-2000, Dublin: Irish Museum of Modern Art, 2000. ISBN 9781873654903. Exhibition catalogue. With a foreword by Sarah Glennie and a text by Val Williams.
- Hannah Starkey: Photographs 1997–2007. Göttingen: Steidl, 2007. Isabella Kullmann; Liz Jobey. ISBN 978-3-86521-373-0.
- Hannah Starkey: Twenty Nine Pictures. Coventry: Mead Gallery, 2011. Hannah Starkey; Diarmuid Costello; Sarah Shalgosky; Margaret Iverson. ISBN 978-0-902683-99-0.
- Photographs 1997–2017. London: Mack, 2018. ISBN 978-1-912339-19-8. With a biographical essay by Charlotte Cotton and a transcript of conversation between Starkey and Liz Jobey.

== Solo exhibitions ==
- 1999: Hannah Starkey, Cornerhouse, Manchester
- 2000: Hannah Starkey: Photographs, Irish Museum of Modern Art, Dublin
- 2000: Hannah Starkey. Un progetto per il castello, Castle of Rivoli
- 2010: Forum für Fotografie, Cologne
- 2011: Hannah Starkey: Twenty-Nine Pictures, Mead Gallery, Warwick Arts Centre, Coventry. Curated by Diarmuid Costello.
- 2011: Visual Puzzles: Hannah Starkey, Ormeau Baths Gallery, Belfast
- 2022/3: Hannah Starkey: In Real Life, The Hepworth Wakefield, Wakefield, UK, 21 October 2022 – 30 April 2023

== Awards ==
- 2019: Honorary Fellowship of the Royal Photographic Society, Bristol

== Collections ==
Starkey's work is held in the following public collections:

- Tate Modern, London: 4 prints (as of August 2020)
- Victoria and Albert Museum, London: 3 prints (as of August 2020)
- Irish Museum of Modern Art, Dublin: 1 print (as of August 2020)
- Castello di Rivoli, Turin: 3 prints (as of August 2020)
