= House of Flora =

British fashion label and design house

- Industry: Fashion
- Genre: Fashion; Art; Design
- Founded: 1996
- Founder: Flora McLean (head designer)
- Headquarters: London, Britain
- Area served: Worldwide
- Products: Couture; Millinery; Jewellery; Fashion accessory
- Website: houseofflora.net

House of Flora (founded 1996) is an established British fashion label and design house founded by designer Flora McLean.

House of Flora designs have been exhibited in the Victoria & Albert Museum in London as part of the 2009 Anthology of Hats exhibition curated by milliner Stephen Jones.

== History ==
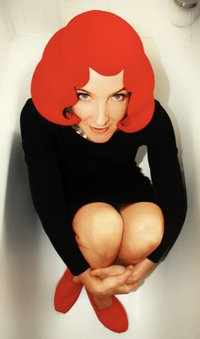
Flora Mclean, founder of House of Flora, wearing one of her own creations, the wig hat.

McLean is the daughter of sculptor Bruce McLean. Some of her first self-made designs were the hats and turbans made for her father's 1996 film, Urban Turban.

House of Flora, McLean's own design house, was founded in 1996 when she started taking on private commissions and making millinery props for magazines, advertising and fashion shows. Her avant-garde design aesthetic is informed by her stated influences of surrealism, constructivism and the Bauhaus movement.

== Collections ==
=== Hats ===
McLean specialises in avant-garde headwear for haute couture designers, catwalks, fashion campaigns and personal collectors. The designs are made often from a variety of different materials not normally associated with millinery, such as PVC, Perspex, felt, leather, wood veneer, fibreglass and nylon, and are influenced by strong geometry and historical figures as well as concepts in modern art. The geometric nature of the designs and the bespoke fabrication detail of the work often leads to it being described as part fashion/part art.

House of Flora has created Millinery Couture for Matthew Williamson, Blumarine, Bruce Oldfield and for Riccardo Tisci at Givenchy Haute Couture.

=== Clothing ===
The design house also provides bespoke clothing designs, such as the pink fibreglass corset and black trench coat outfits designed and fabricated for Victoria's Secret in 2006 and 2008.

McLean debuted her first dress design created under the House of Flora name - entitled Dress No.1 - at the SHOWstudio's 'Future Tense' project in 2008 (a military style cotton printed shirt dress). Dress No.2 (a wool, blue gabardine coat dress) and Dress No.3 (a red printed mackintosh mac dress) followed. It is McLean's stated intention to produce a single House of Flora dress design per season.

== Collaborations ==
=== Neil Moodie ===
McLean and House of Flora's design project collaborations include those with hairstylist Neil Moodie, and with whom McLean has created 'Iconic Heads' - hats inspired by hairstyles and created from in felt and other fabrics, one hat in the form of Elvis's quiff. 'Iconic Heads' has toured to Colette in Paris, Bumble and bumble in New York, and Liberty in London.

=== Danny Flynn ===
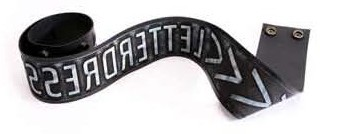

House of Flora worked with award-winning printer Danny Flynn on a collection of accessories inspired by letterpress printing, and which debuted at the 2009 London Fashion Week; this saw the designer's work being rendered as laser-cut typography on rubber for garments and accessories - the piece, entitled Dress No.2, was reviewed at the 2009 London Fashion Week. The designs were also featured in Vogue. Film of the work, Letterhead, can be seen on the Vogue website. An interview with Flynn for Print Week blog described the design collaboration.

=== Justin Anderson ===
The showcase fashion films for the new House of Flora dress collections Dress No.1, Dress No.2 and Dress No.3. were all created by the director Justin Anderson for Ponyboy Films and displayed by Vogue.

== Notable ad campaigns and celebrated models ==
House of Flora designs have been modelled by Beyoncé, on the cover of The Face magazine, by Kate Moss for French Vogue, wearing haute couture Givenchy headwear designed by McLean, and Helena Bonham Carter, Agyness Deyn and Róisín Murphy. McLean's work has also been photographed by Mario Testino, Paolo Roversi, Nick Knight, and Arthur Elgort, among others.

High-profile fashion ad campaigns and shows featuring House of Flora's designs include MAC make-up 2008, Victoria’s Secret shocking pink corset showpiece 2006, Victoria’s Secret trench coat 2008 modelled by Lara Stone in Vogue, Katherine Hamnett ad campaign 2005, Rocco Barocco ad campaign, Blumarine campaign 1999, Luisa Beccaria, and the 'Millinery in Motion' show with Stephen Jones.

In 2010, Mclean was invited to create an installation of her designs for Kalbiri, Covent Garden.

== Awards ==
McLean is a winner of the Jerwood Contemporary Makers prize, an award initiative set up by the Jerwood Charitable Foundation and the UK's only award for the applied arts. The chosen recipients share a prize fund of £30,000 and an exhibition at the Jerwood Space gallery. The Flora McLean/House of Flora design piece, entitled Marcel, which was chosen for the Jerwood Foundation's third and final year of awards and exhibitions, was part of the Iconic Heads wool felt hat project with stylist Neil Moodie in 2009.

An exhibition of the work of all the award winners opened 17-June - 25 July at the Jerwood Space, London, 2010.

== Feature magazines and books ==
House of Flora designs have featured in magazines such as Biba magazine, British Vogue, Vogue Paris (nos.862 and 863), Vogue Italia (nos.661 and 675), Elle UK (6 Nov), Vogue Russian, Vogue Deutsch, Vogue Beauty, Vogue Nippon (no.84), Vogue Casa (no.10), Elle UK (6 Oct, 7 Oct), Elegance (no.2), EPS Moda, Grazia and Grazia Hot List, Independent Magazine, Surface Magazine, Vandidad, British Vogue, The Guardian, Numéro (no.77), Wonderland (nos.01,2,4 and 5), Aygo Magazine, Perspex, Interview (no.101), Toni and Guy Spring 07, Flair, Numéro (nos.75, 76), Numéro (no.75), Ballet Costume, Frank Magazine, Max & Co Japan, Givenchy Haute-Couture, I-D (no.249), The Face (nos.79 and 80).

In 2011, as part of their continuing 'Design' book series, The Design Museum produced 'Fifty Hats That Changed The World', which featured the collaboration of McLean and hairstylist, Neil Moodie
