= Melanie Friend =

British photographer and artist

- Born: Melanie Friend; 1957 (age 68–69); London
- Education: University of York; University of Westminster; London College of Printing
- Notable work: The Home Front
- Awards: Nominated for the Prix Pictet in 2012 and 2013

Melanie Friend (born 1957) is a British photographer/artist. From 2003 to 2019, Friend was Reader in Photography in the School of Media, Film and Music at University of Sussex, England.

== Background ==
Born in London, Friend studied English at the University of York, and Photography at the University of Westminster and the London College of Printing. As a freelance photojournalist in the 1980s, she reported for broadcast and print media such as the World Service, BBC Radio 4, The Guardian, The New York Times, The Economist, and the Financial Times. From the mid-1990s, she shifted her focus to longer-term photographic projects, producing work for exhibitions and books. Her book and exhibition Border Country documents the experiences of asylum seekers detained at the UK's Immigration Removal Centres.

Friend is known for using the tension between images and sound to document conflict. Of Border Country, she writes: "The voices provide an emotional counterpoint to the formal images of the institutions..[prompting the]... listener/viewer to reflect both on the experience of the immigration system itself and on the wider concepts of migration and borders."

Standing By, which uses sound & still images, draws us into Friend's parents' 60-year long relationship. It focuses on their daily solving of The Daily Telegraph 'Quick' crossword, undertaken to combat memory loss. For years, Friend thought that her parents' crossword interactions were funny: how her father barked out the clues in mock-Sergeant Major style and her mother quietly came up with the answers. As they grew older and frailer, and her mother's Alzheimer's disease became apparent, the daily routine of the crossword, initiated by her father, felt increasingly crucial both as a memory exercise and a ritual where humour, conversation and banter could happen as before. The first recordings for Standing By were made in the year 2000; the work was completed in 2017.

Friend was a judge for the FotoDocument Awards 2013 and 2014, and is a member of FotoDocument Advisory Panel (2015). Since 2017 she has been a judge for the Marilyn Stafford FotoReportage Award.

== Publications ==
=== Books ===
- Homes and Gardens: Documenting the Invisible. London: Camerawork, 1996.
- No Place Like Home: Echoes from Kosovo. USA: Midnight Editions, 2001. ISBN 978-1573441193.
- Border Country. Belfast Exposed Photography/The Winchester Gallery, 2007. ISBN 978-0952421795.
- The Home Front. Stockport: Dewi Lewis; Bradford: Impressions Gallery, 2013. ISBN 978-1-907893-41-4.
- The Plain. Stockport: Dewi Lewis, 2020. ISBN 978-1-911306-70-2.

=== Book sections ===
- "Will the bruises still show?" in: Signals: festival of women photographers Interchange Studios, London, 1994.
- "A Documentary Photographer's strategies of representation" in Homes and Gardens: Documenting the Invisible (1996).
- "Claustrophobia" in: Claustrophobia. Ikon Gallery, Birmingham, 1998 ISBN 9780907594581.
- "John Kobal Photographic Portrait Award" in: "John Kobal photographic portrait award 2000". National Portrait Gallery, London. ISBN 9781855143180.
- "No Place Like Home: Echoes of Kosovo" (2001), a chapter in Representations of War, Migration and Refugeehood: Interdisciplinary Perspectives published by Routledge, New York, 2014 eds. Christiane Schlote (University of Zurich, Switzerland) & Daniel Rellstab (University of Vaasa, Finland).
- The Plain (a photographic work in progress), in Spaces of War, War of Spaces Bloomsbury 2020, ISBN 9781501360305.

== Exhibitions ==
- Border Country at Belfast Exposed Photography, Belfast, 16 November 2007 – 11 January 2008.
- European Central Bank Europe Photographic Award 2008: finalists' show Cologne and Frankfurt.
- Gallery 44, Centre for Contemporary Photography, Toronto (Canada) 10 September – 16 October 2010.
- 2013: Images from The Home Front series in group show at Northern Gallery for Contemporary Art.
- 2013 / 2015: The Home Front, An Impressions Gallery touring exhibition, curated by Pippa Oldfield, Impressions Gallery, 2013 Toured to DLI Museum and Art Gallery, Durham, 2014 and University of Hertfordshire Galleries, 14 November 2014 – 31 January 2015.
- Relatives Film Festival, London College of Communication, University of the Arts London, 8 March 2017.
- Images from The Home Front in A Green and Pleasant Land: British Landscape and the Imagination: 1970s to Now, Towner Art Gallery, UK, 30 September 2017 – 21 January 2018.
- 2017/2018 Ryerson Artspace, Toronto, Canada, 5 – 29 September 2018, in conjunction with Gallery 310, School of Image Arts, University of Ryerson, Toronto, Canada 16 – 29 September 2018.
- Images from The Home Front in Generation War, Torrance Art Museum, Los Angeles County, USA, 15 June – 24 August 24, 2019.
- The Home Front at Farleys Gallery, UK, 10 September – 29 October 2020

== Collections ==
Friend's work is held in the following permanent collections:

- National Portrait Gallery, London: 1 print (as of January 2019)
- The Hyman Collection (British Photography): 1 print (as of March 2019)
- Science Museum Group (National Science and Media Museum): 3 prints (as of March 2019)
