= Corinne Silva =

British artist

Corinne Silva (born 1976) is an interdisciplinary artist based in London and Athens. Working across photography, moving image and sculptural installation, Silva engages ecologies of land and communities, making visible fractures of historic violence in the land as well as strategies of survival and resistance. She has made works in Almería, Morocco, and Palestine. Silva gained her PhD from University of the Arts London in 2014.

== Early life and education ==
Silva was born in Leeds, West Yorkshire, England. She studied a BA in Photography in Europe from Universidad de Barcelona and Nottingham Trent University, and an MA in photography at the University of Brighton. She gained her PhD from UAL's London College of Communication in 2014.

== Work ==
Silva was an artist consultant for the international research project Picturing Climate (2018–2020). She exhibited her work Imported Landscapes, on climate and land issues, in Murcia, Southern Spain and Morocco in a series of on-site billboards. The project shed light on the "regions' shared histories and natural features and the difficulties in identifying what is 'native' across geographical and geopolitical borders."

In 2015, Silva held a photographic exhibition entitled Garden State at The Mosaic Rooms in London. The show consisted of a large-scale installation of photographs of Israeli gardens, these images mapping how landscapes are shaped by settlement in the occupied territories over time. Her monograph Garden State was published in 2016 by Ffotogallery and The Mosaic Rooms.

Colin McLaughlin-Alcock, writing in the journal Visual Anthropology Review, states that Silva's work Gardening the Suburbs on the landscapes of Amman, Jordan, builds on the legacy of "social fragmentation and historic erasure that characterize Amman's geography." In 2017 she exhibited her work and co-led (with Eva Sajovic) the Open Lab: Plant/Lives workshop at Darat al Funun in Amman.

The art critic, T. J. Demos writes in his essay "Spaces of Global Capital: On the Photography of Jason Larkin and Corinne Silva" that both Larkin and Silva's work is "deeply contradictory....filled with tension and conflict at once political and socio-economic, architectural and geographic." Demos goes on to state that Silva's imagery of the "paradox of waning sovereignty and walled states" is a contradictory visual statement on globalization by "insistently juxtaposing the signs of wealth and poverty via the architectural and geographical conditions of citizens and migrants, the elite and the disempowered."

== Academic career ==
Silva gained her AHRC-funded PhD from University of the Arts London, LCC, in 2014, and held the posts of Research Fellow and Senior Lecturer at the Photography and the Archive Research Centre, University of the Arts London. until 2024.

== Publications ==
- Róisín Bán. 2006. ISBN 0955252903. With an essay by Brendan McGowan and foreword by Dermot Bolger.
- Wandering Abroad. 2009. ISBN 9780901981837. With essays by Caryl Phillips and Nigel Walsh.
- Garden State. 2016. ISBN 9781872771588.

== Awards ==
- 2014: Triangle International Fellowship award to fund a residency and project in Jordan, Gardening the Suburbs
