= Impressions Gallery =

Art gallery in Bradford, England

- Established: November 1972
- Location: Centenary Square, Bradford, England
- Coordinates: 53.793006°N 1.755769°W
- Founders: Val Williams and Andrew Sproxton
- Director: Anne McNeill
- Website: www.impressions-gallery.com

Impressions Gallery is an independent contemporary photography gallery in Bradford, England. It was established in 1972 and located in York until moving to Bradford in 2007. Impressions Gallery also runs a photography bookshop, publishes its own books and sells prints. It is one of the oldest venues for contemporary photography in Europe.

== Operations ==
Impressions Gallery is a charity, a not-for-profit organisation, funded by Arts Council England and Bradford Metropolitan District Council.

The gallery is host to a temporary exhibitions programme with on average six exhibitions each year, often solo retrospective shows of mid-career photographers, and also some group shows.

The gallery space incorporates a bookshop. The organisation publishes its own books and catalogues, often to accompany its exhibitions, either by itself or in association with others such as Dewi Lewis Publishing and Photoworks. It has published work by Melanie Friend, Paul Floyd Blake, Joy Gregory, Anna Fox, Trish Morrissey, Tessa Bunney, Gavin Parry, Andy Lock, Stefan Ruiz and Laurie Long.

== History ==
The gallery was founded by Val Williams and husband Andrew Sproxton in November 1972, opening in York with two exhibitions, Butlin's by the Sea by Martin Parr and Daniel Meadows (its first exhibition), and Whitby by Frank Meadow Sutcliffe. Parr and Meadows showed work at Impressions throughout the 1970s, with solo shows of Parr's Home Sweet Home in 1974 and Beauty Spots in 1976 and Meadows' Free Photographic Omnibus in 1974 and Clayton Ward in 1978.

In 1976 the gallery moved to Colliergate in York, then moved again to nearby Castlegate in York in 1992. In 2007 the gallery moved to Centenary Square, Bradford.

The gallery's archive, dating back to 1972, was given to the National Media Museum, Bradford, in 2013. It is called the 'Impressions Gallery Archive', a part of the National Photography Collection. It was believed then to be the first time a publicly funded photography gallery has had its archive cared for and made accessible by a national institution.

Anne McNeill has been director since 2000.

== Directors ==
- 1972–1981: Val Williams (founder-director)
- 1972–1977: Andrew Sproxton (founder-director)
- 1981–1986: Frances Middlestorb
- 1986–1994: Paul Wombell
- 1995–1999: Cheryl Reynolds
- 2000–present: Anne McNeill
