= Trish Morrissey =

Irish photographer

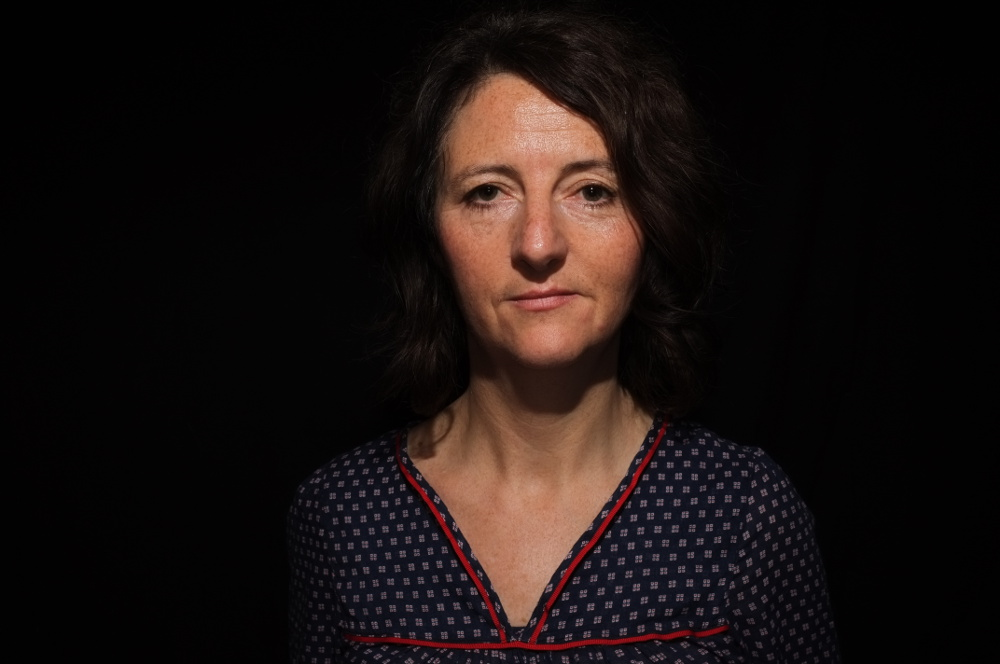
Morrissey in 2014

Trish Morrissey (born 1967) is an Irish artist who combines performance, photography, and film on long-term projects involving self-portraiture. She lives in London. Morrissey's work is held in the collection of the Science Museum Group.

A survey of her work to date, Trish Morrissey, Autofictions, Twenty Years of photography and Film, is currently being exhibited at Impressions Gallery in Bradford, until October 2023.

== Photography ==
Seven Years (2001–2004) is a series of staged portraits in which Morrissey worked with her sister to impersonate real and imagined family members and re-enact conventional family photos—childhood birthdays or holidays at the seaside. The title refers to the age gap between Morrissey and her elder sister.

For Front (2005–2007) ("meaning the seafront, but also because they are all fake family photos") Morrissey travelled to various beaches in the UK and around Melbourne, looking for family groups and groups of friends. She would take the place of one of the female family members—usually the mother figure—and wear an item of her clothing. The woman she had replaced then took the role of the photographer. Sean O'Hagan wrote in The Guardian that "Morrissey's photographs are distilled performances that ask all sorts of questions about the role of sitter and photographer, the role of photography in creating fixed ideas of family, and the nature of the self-portrait when pushed beyond its usual boundaries."

== Personal life ==
Morrissey was born in Dublin and lives in London.

== Publications ==
- Seven Years. Bradford: Impressions Gallery, 2004. Edited by Anne McNeill. ISBN 0-906361-76-1. With an interview between McNeill and Morrissey, and an essay by McNeill ("Secrets and Lies").
- Front. Bradford: Impressions Gallery, 2009. Accompanied an exhibition at Impressions Gallery.
- Trish Morrissey, Autofictions, Twenty Years of photography and Film. Parvs/Serlachius Museums, 2022. Edited by Kate Best. With essays by Best, Lucy Soutter, and Josephine Lanyon, and a preface by Pauli Sivonen.

== Exhibitions ==
=== Solo exhibitions ===
- Seven Years, Gallery of Photography, Dublin, March–April 2005
- Trish Morrissey, Autofictions; Twenty Years of Photography and Film, Serlachius-museo Gustaf, Mänttä-Vilppula, Finland, February 2022 – January 2023; Impressions Gallery, Bradford, July–October 2023. A survey of her work to date.

=== Group exhibitions ===
- Who's looking at the family, now?, Barbican Centre, London, 2018

== Collections ==
Morrissey's work is held in the following permanent collections:

- Science Museum Group, UK: 12 prints (as of 30 July 2023)
- Victoria and Albert Museum, London: 1 print (as of 30 July 2023)
