= Rhonda Wilson (photographer) =

Photographer, writer, editor, and educator in British photography

Rhonda Wilson MBE
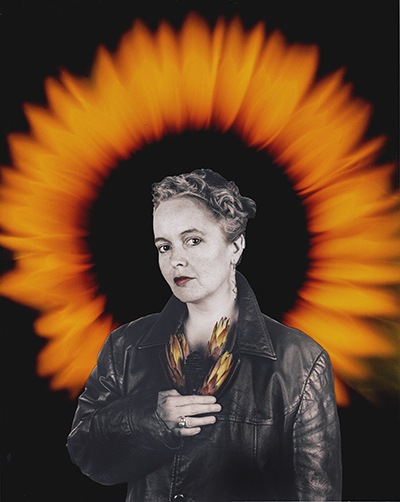
- Ming de Nasty (1995) Portrait of Rhonda Wilson, photocollage, hand-coloured monochrome photograph
- Born: 17 August 1953; Birmingham, England
- Died: 6 November 2014 (aged 61); Birmingham, England
- Education: Master of Arts in Photographic Theory 1990
- Alma mater: University of Derby
- Known for: Seeing the Light organisation
- Notable work: Rough Justice, Worth Paying For
- Style: Staged photography, political posters
- Movement: Feminism
- Partner: John McQueen
- Parents: Len (father); Daisy (mother)
- Awards: MBE for contributions to photography and international trade, 2005
- Memorials: £2,000 Rhonda Wilson Award

Rhonda Wilson MBE (17 August 1953 – 6 November 2014) was a women's activist, photographer, writer, editor, and educator in British contemporary photography, best known for her initiation of the Rhubarb-Rhubarb International Festival of the Image.

== Biography ==
Wilson was born in Birmingham on 17 August 1953 to parents Len and Daisy Wilson, and was the sole sibling of a brother, Clive. In the 1970s she was a trainee journalist with D.C. Thomson & Co. Ltd. in Dundee, on Jackie magazine as a music editor, stylist, photographer and agony aunt.

== Photographer, activist ==
From 1980 in Birmingham Wilson was a freelance graphic designer and editor contributing to such publications as Insist: Birmingham Women Paper, and increasingly worked in photography. With Sue Green she conducted a series of women's photography workshops held in the Arts Lab at The Triangle, Gosta Green in the early eighties. She co-founded the women artists' group Feminsto in 1981, and campaigned against women's low pay and homelessness, exhibiting photo series including Worth Paying For commissioned by the West Midlands Low Pay Unit, The Age of the Elders on people from different cultures of the city ageing together, and From The Heart of the City, a group of 80 portraits of women.

As it did for Peter Kennard, the format of the poster combined Wilson's skills for political purpose; she was the author of a poster illustrated with a photograph by Richard Cross, for two photographic exhibitions Two Faces of War, of Central America by John Hoadland and Richard Cross, and Nicaragua by Susan Meiselas shown at the Triangle Photography Gallery 4 February-1 March 1986. Rough Justice was a set of six posters by Wilson published in 1987 by Birmingham City Council Womens Committee. Martha Rosler remarked of her work that;

Some photographers reject "humanist" documentary, with its multiplicity of buried texts about powerlessness. Rhonda Wilson, of Birmingham, England, wittily staged images for her poster series on women and homelessness in England.

Wilson's career included involvement in Ten.8 magazine where, by 1984, she had joined the editorial board and was responsible for the Ten.8 Touring program of travelling exhibitions supported by West Midland Arts from 1986. She designed two of its issues; "Another Coal Face" (1984) and "Evidence" (1987). She and Roshini Kempadoo co-edited the Spectrum Women's Photography Festival exhibition catalogue, published as a special supplement to issue 30 of 1988.

Also in that year she had a retrospective at the National Museum of Photography, Film and Television in Bradford, visited the Houston FotoFest portfolio reviews in the US that inspired her to set them up later in Britain, and was a presenter discussing "Enterprise/Photography/Culture: Is this the New Reality for Photography?", alongside Graham Budgett, Willie Doherty, Joy Gregory, Susan Hardy, Sylvia Harvey, David Hevey, Pervaise Khan, Eamonn McCabe, Gaby Porter, Juanito Waswhadi, Alan Sekula, and Deborah Willis at the National Photography Conference 21 to 23 July 1989 in Newcastle, a biennial event supported by the Arts Council.

She undertook a Master of Arts in Photographic Theory at the University of Derby 1988 – 1990 and, in partnership with Ming de Nasty, in 1989 established the Poseurs Studio and Gallery in Birmingham's Balsall Heath area, hosting and assembling photographic exhibitions into the early 1990s. She and Ming de Nasty designed half-tone lineblock, black and purple posters in series A Sense of Place, addressing the subject of homeless women in Britain, based on an exhibition of photographs also entitled 'A Sense of Place', held at the National Museum of Film and Photography, Bradford, as part of the Spectrum Women's Photography Festival, 1989.

Wilson left Ten.8 in 1991, but was still listed as 'Editorial Advisor in 1992. The magazine folded in 1993 due to the early 1990s recession.

Working internationally became integral to her photographic projects, developed as campaigns on social issues such as homeless women and unemployment which in the 1990s attracted the attention of overseas gallery curators, resulting in exhibitions in Europe, Australia and the USA. A Sense of Place, her series on women and homelessness, was seen in Bradford, London, Rotterdam, New York and Chicago. Invitations to speak at international photography conferences in Spain and Portugal and at an exhibition of her work in Finland resulted from interest in her working methods of this period in digitised images on CD-ROM and uploaded to overseas via the limited internet bandwidth then available.

== Educator ==
A part-time lecturer at the Nottingham Trent University for twelve years, and as a colleague of Max Kandhola who later joined the board of advisors for Seeing The Light and Rhubarb-Rhubarb photography agency, Wilson contributed to a transformative updating of the photography curriculum. She is remembered by Frede Spencer, a graduate of 1999 who founded the Twenty Twenty Agency, as;

...a person who divided opinions, always challenging the status quo. As a lecturer she never felt part of the establishment but rather an equal, a peer. This lack of social hierarchy meant that as a student you had someone with immense experience talking with you and to you, rather than at you. There was a lovely childlike, almost anarchistic nature to Rhonda. She will be sorely missed by many – the world needs more people like her.

Wilson's major innovation were the courses in Survival Strategies and Professional Practice for practitioners with an emphasis on entrepreneurship, presented by guest lecturers who were curators, photographers and agents. As Max Kandhola, then course leader of the BA (Hons) Photography programme, confirmed;

Rhonda would pave the way forward with her inspired talks and focused insight into the business world of photography, there was always a vision and a journey, and there was no obstacle.

== Birmingham ==
Wilson was also devoted to serving the communities, and the promotion, of the city of Birmingham where she lived. In 1982 she worked on the September edition of Insist: Birmingham Women Paper, was involved with West Midland Arts, contributed to the Birmingham Photographic Heritage Project, established Poseurs Gallery in 1989, and co-produced The People and the City exhibition to support Birmingham's bid for Capital of Culture, which was staged in London in 2008.

A year later she curated and produced the Obama's People exhibition at the Birmingham Museum and Art Gallery attended by over 100,000 visitors, Councillor Mike Whitby noting the aptness of Birmingham as a venue as the twin in city of Barack Obama's hometown, Chicago.

She hosted Rhubarb-Rhubarb International Festival of the Image held in Birmingham every summer at the Orange Studio, STL’s Festival partner. Her nominators for her MBE in the New Year's Honours of 2005 for her contribution to photography and international trade, UK Trade and Investment, based at the Birmingham Chamber of Industry, saw her as key in internationally profiling Birmingham and the West Midlands as a city and region of photographic creative excellence. Its Head of International Trade, BCI Jonathan Webber, and Doug Mahoney, International Trade Director for the West Midlands confirmed that:

UK Trade and Investment and BCI have been working with Seeing The Light and its Director, Rhonda Wilson, on international trade for the past five years. This richly deserved honour reflects the success, dedication and sheer hard work Rhonda and her colleagues have undertaken. We are all very pleased and very, very proud.

She assisted with the establishment in March 2005 of The Chameleon Gallery in Walsall, and opened Rhubarb East Gallery at 25 Heath Mill Lane, Birmingham in March 2010. With Christie's auction house and Mark Storor and Trevor Wornham, owners of a former silver factory in Hockley, Wilson organised a charity auction Wilson and Friends of photographs from the US, Sweden, France, Japan, Korea, California, London, Europe and the Midlands in Birmingham's Jewellery Quarter to raise funds for Acorns Children's Hospice.

== Seeing the Light ==
Wilson’s publication Seeing The Light: The Photographers' Guide to Enterprise appeared in 1993, funded with £3,500 from the Arts Council. The Royal Photographic Society's The Photographic Journal, welcomed it;

Sometimes establishments teaching photography are accused of sending their charges out into a harsh working world without much idea of the practical realities. If this book, published by a University prominent in the visual arts field, is made required reading on all photography courses a gap will have been bridged. Most of the information in it is aimed at those who will choose to earn in the independent sector, and most of it is very down to earth. There are straight factual chapters on business matters: on raising money, using it profitably, setting up shop. There is a chapter giving very direct advice on how to charge for a job, one on finding sources for financing projects...

Wilson's book's success led to her founding her eponymous training and development agency at 212 The Custard Factory, Gibb Street, Digbeth in 1991 when many of the more academic courses had still to address vocational outcomes. STL, which described itself as a ""training" organisation, using unconventional and adventurous strategies," ran for three years supported by her teaching before it finally attracted Arts Council money in 1995. In her own words in 1996, Wilson encapsulated its aims:

Seeing the Light is dedicated to the belief that talented photographers need supporting skills to support their practices and embrace their dreams. Weekend events, short courses and publications, bring together those imagemakers who wish to have a future in the sector with those who are at the leading edge [...] Seeing the Light came across issues which face any imagemaker. How to be viable, creative and imaginative in a time of change. How to ensure that there would be a future, not only for myself, but for those people upon whom the organisation depended. How to support financially a growing team, on fixed or flexible contracts, bringing in those crucial skills when necessary. How to connect internationally with those people around the physical world to increase opportunities.

STL's first major event was 'Survival Strategies' in Birmingham, a weekend of workshops, lectures and seminars with portfolio sessions by experts. It administered several major national conferences and events in which creative practitioners from a broad background of education and previous experience were able to participate, and won the tender to organise "Agents of Change", the Fifth National Photography Conference, held in Derby 22–21 September 1995, devoted to the digital and online image. Presenters included Sean Cubitt, Lola Young, Paul Brookes and Sylvia King, and a 'Cybercaff' with internet link ups, virtual galleries and online demonstrations was incorporated. Wilson emphasised it was "designed to motivate, not alienate, those image makers who already feel excluded from the electronic world."

The Page, The Wall, The Internet conference, and more projects were conducted in collaboration with other Birmingham-based companies, including the Rhubarb-Rhubarb International Festival of the Image; an annual, three-day portfolio review that attracted international audiences and participants to Birmingham. Wilson and Seeing the Light were credited with assisting the organisation of the conference "Virtual Futures 1995: Cyberevolution" 25-28 May1995 at the University of Warwick, Coventry, England.

In 1997 Seeing The Light introduced an affordably-priced 'Open Sesame' portfolio day; a series of 45-minute individual portfolio viewings with several influential people in the business. The event was popular and venues sold out. Wendy Watriss, co-founder of FotoFest in Houston, Texas, said Rhubarb-Rhubarb had become "one of the best portfolio events in the world... one of maybe four or five". In 2007 the company staged its Rhubarb Spontaneous Review at Rencontres d'Arles photography festival.

The 1998 event again took place throughout the country and experts invited included: editorial and advertising photographer Colin Gray at Glasgow's Street Level Gallery; Head of Art Buying at DDB advertising agency in Paris Elaine Harris; Professor Paul Hill FRPS, MBE In Birmingham; artistic director of Photo '98 Anne McNeill in Huddersfield; Canadian artist Evergon at Zone Gallery in Newcastle upon Tyne; photographers Fay Godwin and David Noble in Bedfordshire; documentary photographer Judah Passow at Leicester's Picture House; British Journal of Photography editor Reuel Golden at the BJP in London; and Exhibitions Officer Carol Sartain and Secretary General Barry Lane at the RPS in Bath. In 2001 at Birmingham Museum And Art Gallery she presented Seeing the Light: Commissioning the City

== Recognition ==
In 2003 Rhubarb was a finalist in the West Midlands Arts Awards - Category for Media Organisation Most Promoting the West Midlands Internationally. In 2004 it was short listed for a World Trade Award - Small Business Category and celebrated contacts with new EC countries, including the raising of $32000 at a Rhubarb and Friends benefit auction for the Prague House of Photography, which lead to a grant for $564,000 from the Czech Dept of Culture for a new gallery opening in Spring 2006. Also in 2004 the company won the Creative Industries Award for promoting Birmingham and the West Midlands to International Audiences. Seeing the Light in 2005 received a Creative City Award for Outstanding Innovation for the success of the Rhubarb-Rhubarb web site, and in a collaboration with Creative Partnerships, Seeing the Light worked with 120 5-9 year olds from five schools in Highgate, showcasing their work to thousands of visitors as the main Festival show at the Mailbox.

== Illness and death ==
Of the 2009 manifestation of Rhubarb-Rhubarb's folio reviews and exhibition in Birmingham from 30 July to 2 August, Wilson proudly announced to the British Journal of Photography that:

The public element was staggering; more than 130,000 visitors to the Rhubarb shows this year, from April to August. The standard of work this year was awesome, as are some of the opportunities gained by the photographers attending. We are still gathering feedback on these, but we know that the Arts Council/Rhubarb Bursary winners alone have been extremely successful with offers of shows, publications and competition entries.

However she also warned that the event might also be the last, citing financial constraints due to the recession. The following year, Wilson took leave for seven weeks to recuperate from a hip operation, to return during a time of debilitating cuts to arts funding and, anxious for the future of Rhubarb-Rhubarb and its team, she became ill with severe depression. Despite her bid for non-profit organisation status for Rhubarb-Rhubarb being successful, without Wilson's leadership the company stagnated, the Arts Council withdrew funding, and it was subsequently dissolved.

Despite a successful crowd-funding campaign in support of her treatment, she died aged 61 on Thursday 6 November 2014. Her husband John McQueen remembered;

One of the last things she said to me recently was ‘If an image can hold you for a second, then take you on a journey somewhere secret, peaceful or magical or tell a story to the viewer, it's a true reflection of the person that made it’. To the very end she talked about light.”

== Curator ==
Wilson organised and curated a number of shows starting with her time at Poseurs Gallery, and many associated with Rhubarb-Rhubarb events, as well as the following;

- 2003: Seeing the Light: Narrascape, Sian Bonnell, Barbara Downs, Deborah Jones, Thomas Kellner, Clare Smith and Frank Yamrus, The New Art Gallery Walsall, Walsall, 16 May – 6 July
- 2003: Elliott Landy: late 1960s series on Bob Dylan and The Band, Grosvenor Suite in the Grand Hotel, Birmingham, 25 July to 2 August.
- 2009: Photography is Dead, marking the tenth anniversary of Rhubarb-Rhubard's annual portfolio review which exhibited under the same name.
- 2009: Obama's People, Birmingham Museum & Art Gallery, Chamberlain Square, Birmingham, 18 May – 31 August

== Publications ==
=== Books ===
- James, S., Wilson, R., Brewis, A., & Royal Victoria Infirmary. (1993). Signs of life. Newcastle upon Tyne: Special Trustees of the Royal Victoria Infirmary. ISBN 9780948797842 OCLC 264891871
- Wilson, R., Birmingham (England)., Arts Council of Great Britain., & Nottingham Trent University. (1993). Seeing the light: The photographers' guide to enterprise. Birmingham: Nottingham Trent University in association with Birmingham City Council. ISBN 0905488199 OCLC 1156887495
- Hils, C., & Wilson, R. (2007). New building works.ISBN 9783981151008 OCLC:997439980
- Ellis, J., Wilson, R., Robinson, D., & New Art Gallery Walsall. (2003). Narrascape: Between the man made and the natural : Sian Bonnell, Deborah Jones, Barbara Downs, Thomas Kellner, Clare Smith, Frank Yamrus : [exhibition, New Art Gallery Walsall, Walsall, 16 May - 6 July 2003]. Walsall: New Art Gallery Walsall.

=== Articles ===
- Wilson, R. (1987). "Pictures of Politics and Pleasure, "Women's Self Portrait Project" in Birmingham," Ten.8 20 p.212-13
- van Bennekom, J. & Wilson, R, (1989). "Social Advertisements," Perspektief, Rotterdam, 35 p. 12-19
- Wilson, R. (1994). Review of Annie Liebovilz Photographs 1970 - 1990 at The National Portrait Gallery, London, The Photographic Journal
- Wilson, R. (1996). Life on-line: Rhonda Wilson catches the light. Women's Art Magazine, (69), 12-13.
- Wilson, R. (1998). Death-the Illustration of Life is the self-explanatory title Max Kandhola puts on his remarkable study of his dying father. British Journal of Photography, 12-13.
- Wilson R. (2003). "The People And The City: Brian Griffin". RPS Journal. 143: 130–133.
- McRobbie, A., & Wilson, R. (2012). "Just like a Jackie story," In Feminism for girls (pp. 113-128). Routledge.

== Exhibitions ==
- 1986: West Midland Arts and Ten.8 touring exhibition of the Birmingham Photographic Heritage Project; Pete James, Mohammed Riaz, Karem Ram, Marianne Morris, Ming de Nasty, Prem Aujula, Beryl Small, Darryl Georgiou, Rhonda Wilson and Jeremy Scales
- 1988: retrospective at the National Museum of Photography, Film and Television in Bradford
- 1989: A Sense of Place', National Museum of Film and Photography, Bradford; part of the Spectrum Women's Photography Festival
- 1999: participated in To be continued, a series of artists' commissions that created temporary interventions in public spaces in Walsall

== Collections ==
- Science Museum Group
- Victoria & Albert Museum, London

== Awards ==
- 2005: MBE for contributions to photography and international trade

== Legacy ==
Wilson's efforts encouraged women to enter the photographic industry; Jenny Wilhide, reporting in 2010 on the increase in women in photography quotes her interview with Wilson; "Women photographers seem more confident, more able, says Rhonda Wilson, of photography development agency Rhubarb Rhubarb. "In the past 10 years we have seen the number of women attending our annual International Review increase, and with a much higher standard of work."

In her honour Klompching Gallery launched the £2,000 Rhonda Wilson Award in 2017 to recognise new talent in photography, and to present five finalists at the FRESH Annual Summer Show at Klompching Gallery. The 2019 winner was provided a place at the 2020 Houston FotoFest Meeting Place provided by FotoFest International.
