= Bastienne Schmidt =

German artist

Bastienne Schmidt (born 1961) is a German artist who works in painting, large-scale drawing and photography. Since 1989, Schmidt has worked as a freelance photojournalist for German and American newspapers and magazines.

Her work deals with the correlation between the imagination and the "significance of environment", by referencing the psychological as well as the physical space around us.

She has exhibited her work at the International Center of Photography, the Corcoran Gallery of Art, the Brooklyn Museum, the Museum of Modern Art, among other venues.

== Collections ==
Her work is included in the collections of the Museum of Fine Arts Houston, the Brooklyn Museum, the Museum of Modern Art, New York, the Victoria and Albert Museum, the Center for Creative Photography, Tucson, Arizona,
