= Tom Hunter (artist) =

British artist

Tom Hunter (born 1965) is a London-based British artist working in photography and film. His photographs often reference and reimagine classical paintings. Hunter has shown work internationally in exhibitions, his work is held in a number of public collections and he has had four books published.

== Life and work ==
Hunter was born in Bournemouth, UK. He studied at the London College of Printing and gained an MA from the Royal College of Art in London.

His work has specialised in documenting life in Hackney, depicting local issues and sensationalist news headlines with compositions borrowed from the Old Masters. For instance, his photograph of a squatter, Woman Reading a Possession Order, references Johannes Vermeer's Girl Reading a Letter at an Open Window. This photograph won the Kobal Photographic Portrait Award in 1998. Of the photograph, which was shot with a large-format camera and printed using the Ilfochrome process, Hunter said "I just wanted to take a picture showing the dignity of squatter life – a piece of propaganda to save my neighbourhood....The great thing is, the picture got a dialogue going with the council – and we managed to save the houses".

He was the first photographer to have a show at the National Gallery, London. While praising both the National Gallery exhibition as a whole and several of the photographs within it, Tim Adams criticized a staged photograph, comparing it unfavorably with the work of Richard Billingham or Graham Smith. In 2010 Hunter screened A Palace for Us, a film he made about the elderly residents of public buildings in Woodberry Down, Manor House, London. Jonathan Jones described it as a 'magical' work of contemporary art that chronicled the postwar ambition to provide housing for the working class. In 2019 Hunter showed a series of photographs at Hastings Museum and Art Gallery, of taxi drivers from various other countries that had made Hastings their home, along with works from the museum's collection.

== Books ==
- Factory Built Homes: Holly Street Estate 1968-1998. Holly Street Public Arts Trust, 1998. ISBN 978-0953321506.
- Tom Hunter. Ostfildern, Germany: Hatje Cantz, 2003. ISBN 978-3-7757-1277-4. Edited by White Cube, texts by Michael Bracewell and Paul Shepheard, essays by Jean Wainwright.
- Tom Hunter: Living in Hell and Other Stories. Newhaven, CT: Yale University Press; London: National Gallery, 2005. ISBN 9781857093315.
- The Way Home. Ostfildern, Germany: Hatje Cantz, 2012. ISBN 978-3-7757-3456-1.
- Le Crowbar. Stockport: Here Press, 2013. ISBN 978-0-9574724-5-7. Edition of 1000 copies.

== Exhibitions ==
- Living in Hell and Other Stories, National Gallery, London.
- Tom Hunter: Life and Death in Hackney, National Gallery of Art, Washington, D.C., February-August 2016.
- A Journey Home, Hastings Museum and Art Gallery, Hastings, UK, February–June 2019.

== Awards ==
- 1998: Kobal Photographic Portrait Award for Woman Reading a Possession Order.
