= Dentaid =

British dental charity

Dentaid The Dental Charity is a British dental charity. The organisation is based in Totton, and has been active since the mid-1990s.

Dentaid The Dental Charity provides dental care and oral health advice for people experiencing homelessness, abuse, poverty and harm. They use mobile dental units to travel the UK providing outreach dental clinics for people experiencing homelessness, survivors of abuse, families experiencing poverty, vulnerable women, refugees, cancer patients, fishing communities and other vulnerable people in our communities.

== History ==
Dentaid was founded on the 3rd of November, 1996 when an English dentist refurbished a chair in his garage. Originally, Dentaid focused on refurbishing donated dental equipment and sending it to charitable dental clinics around the world.

In 2009, engineers at Dentaid created the DentaidBox, a portable surgery that can be operated without access to electricity or running water. As the charity gained more funding, they started overseas oral health education project, dental engineer training and volunteering trips. These overseas trips continue to this day.

Dentaids First UK Project took place in Dewsbury, West Yorkshire in December 2015 partnered with The Real Junk Food Project. They provided free clinics for people who were struggling to access dental care. After the success of this project, Dentaid purchased a mobile dental unit to visit more patients in the Uk.

Currently, Dentaid operates nine mobile dental units and one trailer. They travel the country visiting soup kitchens, hostels and community centres with volunteer dental professionals providing dental treatment and oral health advice.

== UK Clinics ==
In the Uk, Dentaid utilises their nine mobile dental units to improve the oral health of vulnerable people. They offer dental screening, oral cancer checks, pain relieving and emergency treatments, preventative and restorative dentistry and oral health advice. Their goal is to breakdown barriers their patients face in accessing dental treatment relieving pain and increasing confidence in their oral health.

Dentaid designs care pathways that specifically suit the people they work with. Using their fleet of mobile dental units they visit locations where patients feel safe. This includes soup kitchens, night shelters, hostels, community centres and projects that support the vulnerable people.

== Overseas clinics ==
Dentaid runs overseas projects aimed at delivering dental care to poor and remote communities in Africa, Asia and South America.

Dentaid supports overseas dental partners by supplying equipment, funding outreach projects, and offering UK volunteer dental professionals opportunities to work alongside local teams. This enables clinicians to deliver care in areas where people have no other access to treatment, running dental clinics and oral health programmes in communities worldwide. Dentaid's projects operate in schools, prisons, orphanages, refugee camps, rural clinics, and regions facing poverty.

The charity provides refurbished and portable dental equipment, which is supplied to dental professionals overseas. Volunteering teams work alongside these professionals, sharing expertise and helping partners expand dental services into new areas.

Dentaid also supports programmes that are training a new generation of dental professionals.
