= Derek Ridgers =

British photographer (born 1950)

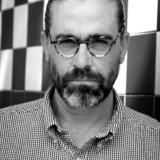
- Born: Derek Ridgers; 20 October 1950 (age 76); Chiswick, London, England
- Known for: Photography art design
- Website: Official website

Derek Ridgers (born 20 October 1950) is a British photographer known for his photography of music, film and club/street culture. He has photographed people including James Brown, the Spice Girls, Sinéad O' Connor, Clint Eastwood and Johnny Depp, as well as politicians (Tony Blair), gangsters (Freddie Foreman), artists (Julian Schnabel), writers (Martin Amis), fashion designers (John Galliano) and sports people (Tiger Woods). Ridgers has also photographed British social scenes such as skinhead, fetish, club, punk and New Romantic.

He has worked for Time Out, The Sunday Telegraph, NME, The Face, Loaded, The Independent on Sunday, The Guardian, The Observer, The Sunday Times, The Independent, GQ, GQ Style, Melody Maker and Sounds.

== Early life ==
Born in Chiswick, west London, Derek Ridgers trained as a graphic artist at Ealing School of Art between 1967 and 1971, where one of his fellow students was Freddie Mercury. Ridgers' love of music led him to attend many live events of the time, one of which was The 14 Hour Technicolour Dream.

Following art school, Ridgers went into advertising, where he worked as an art director for ten years. One of his clients was a camera company and he picked up the product and gave it a try. When he parted with the agency he decided to take up photography.

One of the first concerts at which he took photos was by Ron Wood, Eric Clapton and Pete Townshend at the Finsbury Park Rainbow, on 13 January 1973.

== Professional career ==
The emergence of punk rock in the late 1970s fascinated Ridgers. Among his first published work were pictures taken on a second-hand Nikkormat, bought as a cheap camera to take to punk nights at the Hammersmith Palais. Ridgers used a flash on a home-made bracket. During this time he photographed a very early Adam and the Ants, the Slits, Penetration, the Clash and the Damned. He had an exhibition at the ICA in 1978.

After leaving advertising to become a professional photographer, Ridgers began working for music and style magazines such as NME and The Face.

Ridgers' early photography of skinheads led to several situations where he was personally at risk from some of them until he became accepted as an observer. They were approachable and friendly. Many of these photographs were later collected in the book Skinheads (2010). (Note: http://www.secure.blurb.com/bookstore/detail/1117764)

Morrissey used one of Ridgers' skinhead portraits during his Your Arsenal tour. As well as being used on the tour passes, the image was enlarged enormously and used as the stage backdrop for the tour and for Morrissey's 'Madstock' Finsbury Park gig of August 1992.

Ridgers has photographed the British fetish club scene, from the early days of its inception as a little-known underground scene – for example, the start of the Skin Two club in 1982, which was first held in Stallions nightclub in Soho – up until the Skin Two Rubber Ball and quasi-mainstream acceptability. His work also appeared in Skin Two magazine under the editorship of Michelle Olley. She wrote of his book (Stare) of this work:

Every midnight tribe is here – hippies, punks, ravers, goths, teds, mods and every pretty boy and dirty girl in between, shot in situ in their un-natural habitat. [. . . The book] manages to bring the glamour vixens and club kids together, creating a heady mix of reportage and eroticism. Uniquely, this is 'thrill of the moment' erotic realism, coming as it does directly from the subject, and not the photographer. He shoots it as he sees it, which makes this a rare and precious record of a certain kind of cheekiness, at a certain point in the evening, at a certain time in history.

As well as his portrait-reportage work, Ridgers also began to amass commissions to photograph music and film stars of the era. Working predominantly for NME, but also for national newspapers and other publications, he has photographed Frank Zappa, John Lee Hooker, The Ramones, Prince, The Spice Girls, J. G. Ballard, Richard Harris and Martin Amis.

=== Loaded ===
Ridgers had already collaborated with the writer James Brown at NME. When Brown left to become the editor and co-founder – with Tim Southwell and Mick Bunnage – of Loaded magazine, Ridgers was asked to contribute. Ridgers was present at the inception of a magazine that at its height sold 400,000 copies a month.

As well as photographing a wide range of musicians, actors, writers and athletes, during his long tenure as a cover/features photographer at Loaded, Ridgers would first establish his own page of club photographs called 'Getting Away With It', which would run for fifteen years until 2010, one of the longest running features in the magazine's history. Many of these black-and-white fetish club scene photographs were later included in the book Stare: Portraits from the Endless Night.

Loaded also gave Ridgers his own page, "The Derek Ridgers Interview", in which he told behind-the-scenes stories from his past photo shoots.

=== When We Were Young ===
When We were Young: Club and Street Portraits 1978 – 1987 collects together portraits of young skinheads, punks and new romantics from the seventies through to the late eighties; many, like Boy George, Steve Strange and Spandau Ballet, were photographed while still unknown.

Derek Ridgers's compulsion to photograph London clubs over two decades was an extraordinary one. He has produced thousands of remarkable photographs of remarkable people, transient beings moving across an urban landscape, experimenters, flamboyant souls who cared more than anything about how they looked and whose greatest fear was of being ordinary.

But it was the ordinariness that Derek Ridgers glimpsed in these costumed characters that makes his photographs so powerful. Ridgers's photographs are an undeliberate chapter in a decade of English social and cultural history which changed the way we thought about music, fashion and consumption. It was the decade of the handmade and the customised, of Oxfam shopping, conspicuous sexuality, of excess, wide success and dismal failure.

Played out against the backdrop of a rapidly changing London cityscape and a revolution in politics and economics, the style cultures that Derek Ridgers photographed meant far more than style.

Of Ridgers' photographs of this period, Val Williams writes:

While Meadows' subjects (Note: Williams is referring to the people Daniel Meadows photographed during his bus journey of 1973–74.) revealed themselves as gauche, inhibited and curious, Ridgers's young men and women inhabited the camera's gaze as performers in a very particular arena. But it was the ordinariness that he glimpsed in these costumed characters that makes his photographs so powerful – the people he photographed wore beauty like a mask. The worlds that Ridgers photographed were small ones, peopled by young men and women who were captivated by the idea of image. His photographs do not search souls, they look at surfaces; these are not so much portraits as documents. . . . His subjects knew the rules of photography, knew not to smile or gesticulate – they were always still, needing to be recorded, longing for celebrity. Ridgers's photography captured the transitory nature of culture, a fleeting glimpse into what arrives, passes and is gone.

=== Gucci ===
In 2017, Ridgers collaborated with the Italian fashion house, Gucci, to shoot their Alessandro Michele-designed men's and women's pre-autumn collection in Rome. This collaboration resulted in a photo-book, titled Hortus Sanitatis (Latin for 'garden of health'), published by Gucci and launched at the Comme des Garçons Trading Museum in Paris.

=== Collaborations with Danny Flynn ===
In 2010, Ridgers collaborated with designer and printer Danny Flynn in an exhibition at Ketchum Pleon entitled Every Bodies Enemies. The pieces combined Ridgers' portraits of musicians, film makers and actors, such as Keith Richards, Kylie Minogue, Nick Cave, Dennis Hopper, John Lee Hooker, David Lynch, Elvis Costello and Skin with Flynn's unusual screenprinting technique of printing using everyday powders such as sugar, salt, custard and raspberry powder.

Examples of the work produced for the Every Bodies Enemies gallery show, London:

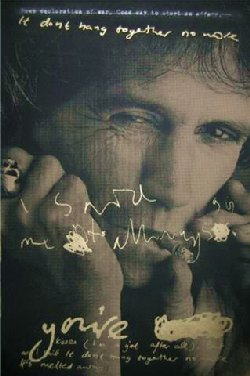

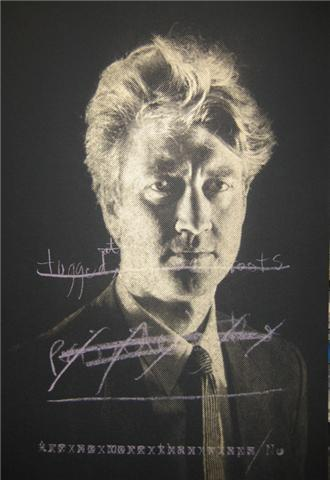

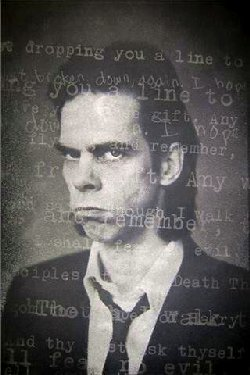

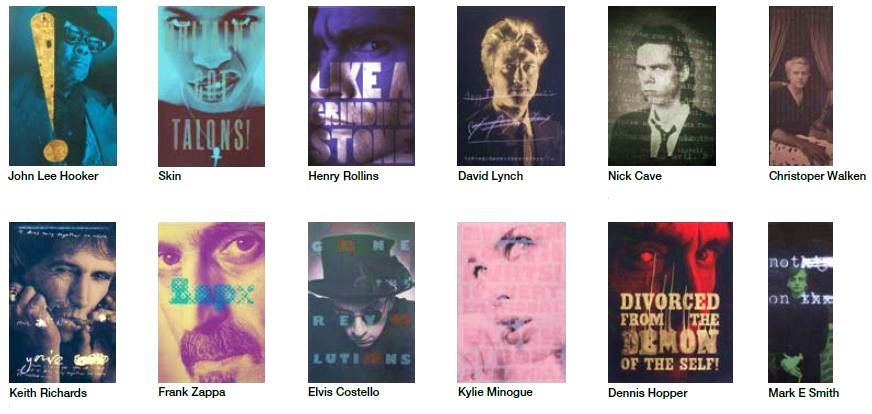

In 2022, Ridgers' images of Nick Cave from four photo-sessions were collated by Flynn into a book called Grace, published by Burning Book Press.

== Publications ==
=== Publications by Ridgers ===
- When We Were Young: Club and Street Portraits 1978–1987. Photoworks ISBN 190379613X. (2004; edited by Val Williams))
- Stare: Portraits from the Endless Night. Goliath, ISBN 3936709211. (2007)
- Afternoon at the Seven Palms and Other Stories. Self-published, Blurb. (Note: Afternoon at the Seven Palms is here at blurb.com.)
- Unpublished. Self-published, Blurb. (Note: Unpublished is here at blurb.com.)
- Skinheads. Self-published, Blurb
- Un/seen. Self-published, Blurb. (Note: Ridgers' page at blurb.com is here (2009). Un/seen is here at blurb.com.)
- 78-87 London Youth. Damiani. (2014)
- Skinheads: 1979–1984. Omnibus Press. (2014)
- The Others. IDEA (2015)
- The Dark Carnival – Portraits from The Endless Night. Carpet Bombing Culture (2015)
- Punk London 1977. Carpet Bombing Culture (2017)
- Hortus Sanitatus x Gucci. IDEA (2017)
- In the Eighties: Portraits from Another Time. Carpet Bombing Culture (2017)
- Derek Ridgers: Photographs. Carpet Bombing Culture (2018)
- Nick Cave 84. Zine (2019)
- YSL. Yves Saint Laurent photozine (2021)
- Grace... 84,89,92,97. Burning Book Press (2022)
- KU / Ibiza 1984. photozine (2024)
- The London Youth Portraits. ACC Books (2024)

=== Publications with contributions by Ridgers ===
- ROXY 100 Nights at the Roxy: Punk London 1976-77 1977 – by Andrew Czezowski
- Skinhead – by Nick Knight
- Fashioning London: Clothing and the Modern Metropolis – by Christopher Breward
- Fashion as Photograph: Viewing and Reviewing Images of Fashion – by Eugenie Shinkle
- New Romantics: The Look – by Dave Rimmer
- Moshpit Culture – by Joe Ambrose and Chris Charlesworth
- Popular Culture: The Metropolitan Experience – by Iain Chambers
- In the Flesh: The Cultural Politics of Body Modification – by Victoria Pitts
- Cultural Studies: Vol 1 – by James Donald
- Liminal Acts: A Critical Overview of Contemporary Performance and Theory – by Susan Margaret Broadhurst
- The Look: Adventures in Rock and Pop Fashion – by Malcolm McLaren, Paul Gorman, and Paul Smith
- Rap Attack 3: African Rap To Global Hip Hop – by David Toop
- Love Lust Desire – by Michelle Olley
- Turquoise Days: The Weird World of Echo and The Bunnymen – by Chris Adams
- Fetish: Masterpieces of Erotic Fantasy Photography – by Tony Mitchell
- Vintage: Art of Dressing Up – by Tracy Tolkien
- My Favourite Model – by various

== Exhibitions ==
=== Solo exhibitions ===
- Punk Portraits, ICA, London (1978)
- Skinheads, Chenil Studio Gallery (1980)
- The Kiss, The Photographers' Gallery, London (1982)
- One Man Show, City Centre Art Gallery, Dublin (1990)
- The Endless Night: 35 Years of Nightclub Portraits, The Museum of Club Culture, Hull (2012)
- Derek Ridgers: Photographs - Truman Brewery (2018)
- Punk London 1977 - Galeria Rondo Sztuki, Katowice, Poland (2018)

=== Exhibitions with others ===
- Look at Me: Fashion And Photography In Britain 1960 To The Present Day, Milton Keynes Art Gallery (2001)
- Black British Style, Victoria and Albert Museum, London (2004–05)
- The London Look, Museum of London (2004)
- How We Are Now, National Portrait Gallery, London (2007)
- How We Are: Photographing Britain. Tate Britain, London (2007).
- Every Bodies Enemies (with Danny Flynn), Ketchum Pleon, London (2010)
- Observers: Photographers of the British Scene from the 1930s to Now, Galeria de Arte do Sesi, São Paulo, Brazil (2012)
- Sunday Times Magazine 50th Anniversary Exhibition, Saatchi Gallery, London (February 2012).
  (A Celebration of the Times's 1962 origination of newspaper colour supplements. 60 photographers exhibited, including Ridgers' portrait of Keith Richards)
- Pump Me Up: D.C. Subculture of the 1980s, The Corcoran Gallery of Art, Washington, USA (2013)
- Ibiza: Moments In Love, Institute of Contemporary Arts, London (2013)
- Club to Catwalk: London Fashion in the 1980s, Victoria and Albert Museum, London (2013)
- London Fashion Week (with silversmith Andrew Bunney), 2012
- 50 Years of British Style, Ben Sherman, Spitalfields, London (2013)
- One Nation Under a Groove, South Bank Centre, London (2015)
- Work, Rest and Play: British Photography from the 1960s to Today, touring exhibition, China (2015)
- Punk Weekender - The Photographers' Gallery, London (2016)
- Golden Boundaries - Robert Capa Centre, Budapest (2017)
- Coming Out: Sexuality, Gender & Identity - Walker Art Gallery, Liverpool (2017)
- Rock, Funk, Punk - Fotografie Forum Frankfurt (2017)
- Youth - D Museum, Seoul, Korea (2017)
- Collaborate at Free Range - Truman Brewery (2018)
- Sweet Harmony Rave|Today - Saatchi Gallery, London (2019)
- Physical Distancing - Electrowerkz, London (2021)
- The Horror Show: A Twisted Tale of Modern Britain - Somerset House (2022)

== Collections ==
Ridgers' photography is held in the following collection:

- National Portrait Gallery, London.

== Personal life ==
Ridgers is a keen amateur poker player after developing his taste for the game when he covered the World Series of Poker in 2000 for Loaded magazine, photographing the event and the participation in it of the British champion Dave Ulliott ('Devilfish').

Ridgers is a lifelong fan of the English football team, Tottenham Hotspur, is a Tottenham Hotspur Supporters Trust board member, and has designed the Trust ads and literature.
