= Toby Glanville =

British photographer

Toby Glanville (born 1961) is a British photographer. He has worked in portraiture, documentary and food photography. Glanville's portraits, among other work, are held in the collections of the British Council, National Portrait Gallery, London, and the Victoria and Albert Museum.

== Publications ==
=== Books by Glanville ===
- Bread and Stone – Worker's Portraits. British Council, 1995. ISBN 978-0863552847. With an essay by Andrew Palmer.
- Actual Life. Brighton and Hove: Photoworks, 2002. ISBN 9781903796061. With essays by David Chandler and Adam Phillips. Edition of 1000 copies.

=== Books with contributions by Glanville ===
- The English Cat at Home. Salem House, 1989. By Matthew Sturgis. ISBN 978-0881624021.
- Breakfast, Lunch, Tea: The Many Little Meals of Rose Bakery. London: Phaidon, 2006. By Rose Carrarini. ISBN 978-0714844657.
- The Lebanese Kitchen. London: Phaidon, 2012. By Salma Hage. ISBN 978-0714864808.
- Anthony Caro: 0000. London: Phaidon, 2014. Edited by Amanda Renshaw. ISBN 978-0714867359.
- The Turkish Cookbook: The Culinary Traditions & Recipes from Turkey. London: Phaidon, 2019. By Musa Dagdeviren. ISBN 978-0714878157.

== Collections ==
Glanville's work is held in the following permanent collections:

- British Council, UK: 5 prints (as of 25 May 2023)
- National Portrait Gallery, London: 28 prints (as of 25 May 2023)
- Victoria and Albert Museum, London: 10 prints (as of 25 May 2023)
