= Media Space =

Exhibition at the London Science Museum

Coordinates: 51°29′50.46″N 0°10′27.52″W

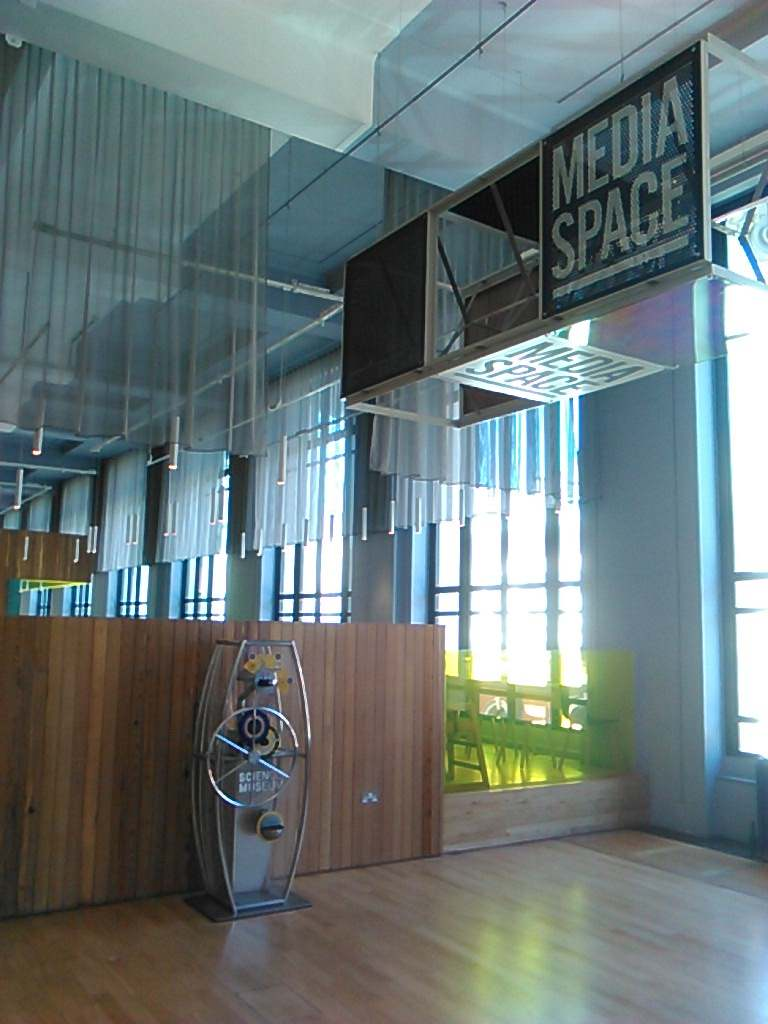
The Media Space cafe

Media Space is a 642-square-metre (6,910 sq ft) exhibition space at the Science Museum, London, developed in association with the National Science and Media Museum.

Opened in September 2013, the space comprises an extensive gallery surrounded by cultural spaces for display and participation, for mixing across the arts, sciences and creative industries. It also intended to be a showcase for the National Media Museum collections in photography, as well as cinematography and broadcast technology, and an arena where audiences will engage with how new technologies have impacted on today’s creative industries. It is intended for adult audiences.

In 2016, some outlets reported that Media Space was scheduled to close later that year. However, the Voyages exhibition, by renowned photographers Anderson & Low, ran in the space from March–June 2017.

== Exhibitions ==
- 2013/2014: Only in England: Photographs by Tony Ray-Jones and Martin Parr. Photographs by Tony Ray-Jones and Martin Parr. With material from the National Media Museum's Ray-Jones archive curated by Martin Parr and Greg Hobson.
- 2015: Revelations: Experiments in Photography. Toured to National Media Museum, Bradford. Curated by Greg Hobson and Ben Burbridge.
- 2015/2016: Julia Margaret Cameron: Influence and Intimacy. Photographs by Julia Margaret Cameron.
- 2015/2016: Gathered Leaves: Photographs by Alec Soth. Photographs and books by Alec Soth. Curated by Kate Bush.
- 2016: Fox Talbot: Dawn of the Photograph. Collection of Victorian photography. Co-curated by Greg Hobson and Russell Roberts.
- 2017: Voyages. Photographs by Anderson & Low.
