= Val Williams =

British curator and author

Professor Val Williams
- Born: Coventry, England
- Occupation: Curator

Val Williams is a British curator and author who has become an authority on British photography. She is the Professor of the History and Culture of Photography at the London College of Communication, part of the University of the Arts London, and was formerly the Curator of Exhibitions and Collections at the Hasselblad Center.

== Life and work ==
Williams has curated the work of Martin Parr and Daniel Meadows. She "has championed Meadows' work for years even as most British institutions have ignored it". Williams curated the influential Tate Britain show How We Are: Photographing Britain. She has also written on the representation of women, and work by women photographers. She co-founded PARC, the Photography and the Archive Research Centre in 2003. Her archive was held at the Library of Birmingham but moved to the Martin Parr Foundation in Bristol in 2018.

== Exhibitions curated ==
- How We Are: Photographing Britain, Tate Britain, London, 2007. Curated by Williams and Susan Bright.
- Soho Nights, The Photographers' Gallery, London, 2008/2009. Curated by Williams and Bob Pullen. "Part of an ongoing series of linked exhibitions taken from the gallery's archives."

== Publications ==
=== Books by Williams ===
- Women Photographers.
  - Women Photographers: The Other Observers, 1900 to the Present. London: Virago, 1986.
  - The Other Observers: Women Photographers in Britain 1900 to the Present. London Virago, 1994. ISBN 9781853814204.
- Ida Kar: Photographer, 1908-1974. London Virago, 1990. ISBN 978-1853811043.
- ..Who's looking at the family?. London: Barbican Art Gallery, 1994. ISBN 9780946372324. "Catalogue of an exhibition held at the Barbican Art Gallery, 26th May - 4th Sept., 1994" "an exhibition selected by Val Williams, Carol Brown and Brigitte Lardinois."
- Warworks: Women, Photography and the Iconography of War. London: Virago, 1994. ISBN 9781853815911.
- The Dead. By Williams and Greg Hobson. Bradford: National Museum of Photography, Film & Television, 1995. ISBN 0-948489-15-4. With essays by Williams ("Secret Places"), Hobson ("A Horrible Exhibition"), Elizabeth Edwards ("Seeing How Others Die") and Thomas Lynch ("Embalming Father"); and photographs by Nobuyoshi Araki, Sue Fox, Kasimir Zgorecki, Franco Zecchin, Thomas Werde, Belinda Whiting, Rudolph Schafer, Leslie Hakim-Dowek, Krass Clement, Donigan Cumming, Hans Danuser, Louis Jammes, Max Jourdan, Pete Max Kandhola, Ann Mandelbaum, Bastienne Schmidt, Andres Serrano, John Benjamin Stone, Clare Strand, Annet van der Voort, Nick Waplington, Elizabeth Williams, Neil Winokur, and Xavier Zimbardo. Published to accompany a touring exhibition starting at the National Museum of Photography, Film & Television, October 1995 – January 1996, curated by Williams and Hobson.
- Street dreams: contemporary Indian studio photographs from the Satish Sharma Collection. London: Booth-Clibborn, in association with Shoreditch Biennale, 1997. ISBN 9781861540713. "Published in conjunction with the ... exhibition ... which opened at Standpoint Gallery, London as part of the 1997 Shoreditch Biennale exhibitions programme".
- Martin Parr
  - London: Phaidon, 2002. ISBN 0-7148-3990-6. Hardback.
  - Martin Parr. Rome: Contrasto, 2002. ISBN 888698247X. Italian-language version.
  - Berlin: Phaidon, 2008. ISBN 0714893919. German-language version.
  - London: Phaidon, 2004. ISBN 071484389X. Paperback.
  - 2nd ed. London: Phaidon, 2014. ISBN 0714865664.
- Derek Ridgers: When We Were Young: Club and Street Portraits 1978–1987. Brighton: Photoworks, 2005. ISBN 978-1903796139. Photographs by Derek Ridgers, text by Val Williams. About the emergence of new style cultures in London in the late 1970s and early 1980s. (Note: The publication is reproduced here within Photography and the Archive Research Centre's site.)
- Daniel Meadows: Edited Photographs from the 70s and 80s. Brighton: Photoworks, 2011. ISBN 1-903796-46-6. Authored by Val Williams. Edited by Val Williams and Gordon MacDonald.
- When Photography Really Works. New York: Barron's Educational Series; London: Quintessence, 2012. ISBN 9780764147890.
- What Makes Great Photographs: 80 Masterpieces Explained.
  - London: Apple, 2012. ISBN 9781845434533.
  - London: Frances Lincoln, 2013. ISBN 9780711235069.
  - Pourquoi est-ce un chef-d'oeuvre? 80 photographies expliquées. Paris: Eyrolles, 2013. ISBN 978-2212555295. French-language version.
- Seaside Photographed. By Williams and Karen Shepherdson. London: Thames & Hudson, 2019. ISBN 978-0-500-02206-1. Published to accompany an exhibition of the same name.

=== Books edited by Williams ===
- Daniel Meadows. National Portraits: Photographs from the 1970s. Edited by Williams. Salford: Viewpoint Photography Gallery; Derby: Montage Gallery, 1997. ISBN 0-901952-81-8.
- Look at Me: Fashion and Photography in Britain 1960-1997. Edited by Williams. London: British Council, 1998. ISBN 978-0863553899. Catalogue of a touring exhibition curated by Williams and Brett Rodgers.
- Magnum Ireland. London: Thames & Hudson, 2005. ISBN 9780500543030. Edited by Williams with Brigitte Lardinois.
- Anna Fox Photographs 1983–2007. Brighton: Photoworks, 2005. ISBN 978-1903796221. Edited by Williams. With texts by David Chandler, Val Williams, Jason Evans and Mieke Bal. (Note: The publication is reproduced here within Photography and the Archive Research Centre's site.)
- How We Are: Photographing Britain from the 1840s to the Present. Edited and with texts by Williams and Susan Bright. London: Tate, 2007. ISBN 978-1-85437-714-2. With essays by Gerry Badger and Martin Parr, and by Kevin Jackson.
- Glyndebourne, a Visual History. London: Quercus, 2009. ISBN 9781847248657. Edited by Williams and Brigitte Lardinois. Includes an essay by George Christie.
