= Susan Bright =

British writer and curator of photography

- Education: Goldsmiths, University of London
- Occupations: Painter and curator of photography

Susan Bright is a British writer and curator of photography, specializing in how photography is made, disseminated and interpreted. She has curated exhibitions internationally at institutions including Tate Britain, National Portrait Gallery in London and the Museum of Contemporary Photography in Chicago, among others.

Her published books include Feast for the Eyes: The Story of Food in Photography (2017), Home Truths: Photography and Motherhood (2013), Auto Focus: The Self Portrait in Contemporary Photography (2010), How We Are: Photographing Britain (2007: co-authored with Val Williams), Face of Fashion (2007), and Art Photography Now (2005).

== Education ==
She holds a Ph.D in Curating from Goldsmiths, University of London.

== Career ==
The exhibition How We Are: Photographing Britain was the first major exhibition of British photography at Tate Britain. The exhibition of Home Truths (The Photographers' Gallery and the Foundling Museum and traveling to the Museum of Contemporary Photography, Chicago, and Belfast Exposed) was named one of the top exhibitions of 2013/2014 by The Guardian and the Chicago Tribune.

She regularly writes for museums and monographic books, and contributes to numerous magazines and journals.

== Curated exhibitions ==
- Icons of Pop (co-curated with Terence Pepper and Philip Hoare), National Portrait Gallery, London, June - September 1999
- Artists of the 1990s, National Portrait Gallery, London, January–June 1999
- Published Portraits, Association of Photographers Gallery, London, January 2001
- Faith & Brazil Incarnate: Mike Abrahams & Christopher Pillitz, Association of Photographers Gallery, London, April 2001
- Gun Nation: Zed Nelson, Association of Photographers Gallery, London, June 2001;
- Building Sights: London Architectural Photography Association of Photographers Gallery, London, September 2001; then toured with the British Council to Lithuania and Estonia);
- Truth and Lies: Jillian Edelstein, Association of Photographers Gallery, London, February 2002;
- Enterprise Works, Barge House, London, November 2004; then toured to Mailbox Birmingham; Discovery Museum, Newcastle; Royal Scottish Academy, Edinburgh, 2005.
- 1+1=3: Collaboration in Contemporary British Portraiture, Fremantle Arts Centre, Western Australia, March–April 2006; Australian Centre for Photography, Sydney, April–May 2007.
- Face of Fashion: Corinne Day, Mert & Marcus, Steven Klein, Paolo Roversi & Mario Sorrenti, National Portrait Gallery, London, February–May 2007.
- How We Are: Photographing Britain, co-curated with Val Williams, Tate Britain, London, May–September 2007.
- Something Out of Nothing, Fotogalleriet (no), Oslo, Norway, October–November 2007.
- Home Truths: Photography and Motherhood, The Photographers' Gallery, London; Foundling Museum, London, October 2013 – January 2014; Museum of Contemporary Photography, Chicago, April–July 2014; Belfast Exposed, Belfast, Northern Ireland, October 2014–January 2015.

== Publications ==
- Art Photography Now. New York: Aperture, 2005. ISBN 9781597110266.
  - London: Thames & Hudson, 2006.
  - Art Photography Now: Revised and expanded edition. Thames & Hudson, 2011. ISBN 978-0500289426.
- How We Are: Photographing Britain from the 1840s to the Present. Edited and with texts by Bright and Val Williams. London: Tate, 2007. ISBN 978-1-85437-714-2. With essays by Gerry Badger and Martin Parr, and by Kevin Jackson.
- Face of Fashion: Photographs by Mert Alas & Marcus Piggott, Corinne Day, Steven Klein, Paolo Roversi and Mario Sorrenti. New York: Aperture, 2007. ISBN 978-1597110396. With work by Mert and Marcus, Corinne Day, Steven Klein, Paolo Roversi, and Mario Sorrenti.
- Auto Focus: The Self-Portrait in Contemporary Photography. London: Thames & Hudson, 2010. ISBN 978-0500543894.
- Home Truths: Photography and Motherhood. 2013. ISBN 978-1-908970-10-7. Edited by Bright. With essays by Bright, Stephanie Chapman, Nick Johnstone and Simon Watney and photographs by Janine Antoni, Elina Brotherus, Elinor Carucci, Ana Casas Broda, Ann Fessler, Tierney Gearon, Miyako Ishiuchi, Fred Hüning, Leigh Ledare, Annu Palakunnathu Matthew, Katie Murray and Hanna Putz,
- Feast for the Eyes. New York: Aperture, 2017. ISBN 978-1-59711-361-8.
