= List of British women photographers =

This is a list of women photographers who were born in the United Kingdom or whose works are closely associated with that country.

== A ==
- Sarah Angelina Acland (1849–1930), amateur photographer who pioneered colour in Gibraltar in 1903 and 1904 and later in Madeira
- Fiona Adams (1935–2020), known for photographing the Beatles
- Deborah Anderson (born 1970), photographer, musician, film director
- Nudrat Afza (born 1955), Bradford-based documentary photographer
- Heather Agyepong (born 1990), photographer, visual artist and actor
- Heather Angel (born 1941), nature photographer
- Sue Arrowsmith (1950–2014), artist creating experimental photographic compositions
- Olivia Arthur (born 1980), documentary photographer
- Anna Atkins (1799–1871), botanist, first person to publish a book illustrated with photographic images
- Emily Allchurch (born 1974), British artist known for using digital photography and lightbox art to create new works based on masterpieces of world art
- Anna Atkins (1799–1871), botanist and pioneering photographer, first person to publish a book containing photographs
- Shona Auerbach (fl 1996), photographer and cinematographer

== B ==
- Marjorie Baker (1912–2004), documented changing life in Sussex from mid to late twentieth century
- Shirley Baker (1932–2014), known for street photography and street portraits
- Jennie Baptiste (born 1971), documented 1990s and 2000s Black British youth and music culture
- Lisa Barnard (born 1967), documentary photographer, political artist, and senior lecturer at University of South Wales
- Kate Barry (1967–2013), fashion photographer
- Emma Barton (1872–1938), portrait photographer, autochromes, awarded the Royal Photographic Society Medal in 1903
- Rebecca Lilith Bathory (born 1982), also known as Rebecca Litchfield
- Janette Beckman (fl 1970s), documentary photographer
- Sunara Begum (born 1984), visual and performance artist, filmmaker, photographer and writer
- Mabel Bent (1847–1929), pioneer travel photographer, working in the Eastern Mediterranean, southern Africa and the Arabian peninsula
- Zarina Bhimji (born 1963), photographer of the effects of the expulsion of Asians from Uganda and other migration issues
- Dorothy Bohm (1924–2023), originally from Königsberg, initially portraits, later street photography, from 1985 in colour
- Sian Bonnell (born 1956), photographic artist
- Gemma Booth (born 1974), fashion photographer
- Ethel Booty (1873–1964), photographer of buildings
- Jane Bown (1925–2014), portrait photographer, also worked for The Observer
- Carla Borel (born 1973), French-British portrait and street photographer
- Sonia Boyce (born 1962), contemporary artist, photographer, educator
- Polly Braden (born 1974), documentary photographer,
- Sarah Anne Bright (1793–1866), artist, photographer, produced the earliest surviving photographic images taken by a woman
- Zana Briski (born 1966), documentary, especially insects
- Christina Broom (1862–1939), said to be Britain's first female press photographer
- Alicia Bruce (born 1979), photographer and educator
- Zoë Buckman (born 1985), multi-media artist, photographer
- Cindy Buxton (born 1950), wildlife photographer, filmmaker

== C ==
- Juno Calypso (born 1989), photographer who makes self-portraits
- Julia Margaret Cameron (1815–1879), notable early work, closely cropped portraits of celebrities, 800 of her works owned by the Royal Photographic Society
- Hilda Mabel Canter (1922–2007), mycologist and photographer
- Scarlett Carlos Clarke (born 1992), photographer and artist
- Natasha Caruana (born 1983), photographic artist
- Gayle Chong Kwan (born 1973), installation artist employing photography and video
- Margaret Chute (1886–1948), freelance photographer, active in Hollywood
- Araminta de Clermont (born 1971), artistic photographer
- Keturah Anne Collings (1862–1948), photographer, painter
- Hannah Collins (born 1956), contemporary artist, filmmaker, photographer
- Lena Connell (1875–1949), suffragette and photographer
- Sophie Cook (born 1967), author, broadcaster, photographer and politician
- Joan Craven (1897–1979), photographer
- Elaine Constantine (born 1965), photographer, filmmaker
- Care Johnson (born 1993), photographer, blogger, makeup artist

== D ==
- Muriel Darton (1882–1945), suffrage activist and professional photographer
- Siân Davey (born 1964)
- Corinne Day (1962–2010), fashion and documentary photographer
- Araminta de Clermont (born 1971), art photographer
- Venetia Dearden (born 1975), photographer, filmmaker
- Erica Deeman (born 1977), visual artist
- Susan Derges (born 1955), photographic artist, camera-less photography
- Chloe Dewe Mathews (born 1982), documentary photographer
- Mary Dillwyn (1816–1906), earliest female photographer in Wales
- Zoë Dominic (1920–2011), dance and theatre photographer

== E ==
- Olive Edis (1876–1955), portraits and early autochromes, diascope viewer
- Amanda Eliasch (active since 1999), photographer, artist, filmmaker
- Amelia Ellis (born 1977), German-British novelist and photographer

== F ==
- Florence Farmborough (1887–1978), writer, photographer, nurse
- Candice Farmer (born c. 1970), underwater fashion photographer
- Joan Leigh Fermor (1912–2003), photographer
- Mary Georgina Filmer (1838–1903), early proponent of photomontage
- Mary Fitzpatrick (born 1968), known for her work on spaces abandoned after conflict
- Amy Flagg (1893–1965), historian and photographer
- Anna Fox (born 1961), office life in London, "Made in" series on Milton Keynes, Kansas, Gothenburg and Florence
- Constance Fox Talbot (1811–1880), wife of Henry Fox Talbot, experimented with photography as early as 1839
- Catriona Fraser (born 1972), photographer and art dealer
- Catherine Fried (1936–2015), artist, photographer and writer
- Melanie Friend (born 1957), photographer, educator
- Jill Furmanovsky (born 1953), specialises in documenting rock musicians.

== G ==
- Yishay Garbasz (born 1970), contemporary artist, photographer
- Emily Garthwaite (born 1993), photojournalist
- Sophie Gerrard (born 1978), documentary photographer
- Paula Rae Gibson (born 1968), art photography
- Fay Godwin (1931–2005), landscape photographer
- Leah Gordon (born 1959)
- Eva Grant (1925–2024), Greek–British figure photographer
- Yvonne Gregory, (1889–1970), society and figure photographer

== H ==
- Pamela Hanson (active since 2001), fashion photographer
- Emma Hardy (born 1963)
- Alice Seeley Harris (1870–1970), missionary, documentary photographer
- Clementina Hawarden (1822–1865), portrait photographer in the 1860s, predating Julia Margaret Cameron
- Claudette Holmes (born 1962), known for her representations of Black people
- Kate Holt (born 1972), Zimbabwe-born British photojournalist
- Alice Hughes (1857–1939), leading London portrait photographer specialising in images of fashionable women and children

== I ==
- Nadine Ijewere (born 1992), fashion and portrait photographer
- Pam Isherwood (born 1949), documentary photographer

== J ==
- Adama Jalloh (born 1993), portrait and documentary photographer
- Izabela Jedrzejczyk (born 1953), documentary photographer
- Care Johnson (born 1993), photographer, retoucher, public speaker
- Andrea Jones (born 1960), garden photographer
- Elsbeth Juda (1911–2014), fashion photographer

== K ==
- Ann Kelley (born 1941), children's writer, poet, photographer
- Roshini Kempadoo (born 1959), photographer, media artist and academic
- Barbara Ker-Seymer (1905-1993), photographer and society figure

== L ==
- Etheldreda Laing (1872–1960), early autochrome photographs
- Alice Longstaff (1907–1992), photographer

== M ==
- Neeta Madahar (born 1966), artistic photographer specialising in nature, birds and flora
- Jessie Mann (1805–1867), early Scottish photographer, assistant of David Octavius Hill and Robert Adamson
- Rita Martin (1875–1958), English photographer
- Georgina Masson (1912–1980), photographer, non-fiction writer
- Chloe Dewe Mathews (born 1982), documentary photographer
- Jenny Matthews (born 1948), documentary photographer
- Mary McCartney (born 1969), ballet dancers, Spice Girls
- Wendy McMurdo (born 1962), exploring the relationship between technology and identity
- Lotte Meitner-Graf (1899–1973), portrait photographer in Vienna until 1937 when she came to London, Great Britain
- Yevonde Middleton (1893–1975), pioneer of the use of colour in portrait photography.
- Kirsty Mitchell (born 1976), photographer of staged scenes
- Margaret Mitchell (born 1968), Scottish portrait and documentary photographer
- Maria Mochnacz (fl 1990s), photographer and video music director
- Augusta Mostyn (1830–1912), philanthropist, artist, photographer
- Maggie Murray (born 1942), photojournalist and documentary photographer
- Tish Murtha (1956–2013), documentary photographer
- Helen Muspratt (1907–2001), photographer

== N ==
- Cathleen Naundorf (born 1968), contemporary artist and fine art photographer
- Caroline Emily Nevill (1829–1827), early photographer and pioneering member of the Photographic Exchange Club

== O ==
- Rachel Owen (1968–2016), Welsh photographer, printmaker and lecturer

== P ==
- Laura Pannack (born 1985), social documentaries and portraits
- Eileen Perrier (born 1974)
- Vinca Petersen (born c. 1972)
- Sarah Pickering (born 1972)
- Jill Posener (born 1953), lesbian photographer, playwright
- Brenda Prince (born 1950), documentary photographer

== Q ==
- Terri Quaye (born 1940), musician, ethnographic photographer

== R ==
- Franki Raffles (1955–1994), social documentary photographer
- Eileen Ramsay (1915–2017), known for yachting and powerboat photography
- Suze Randall (born 1946), erotic photographer
- Lilian Ream (1877–1961), photographer
- Joanne O'Brien (born 1949), portrait and reportage photographer
- Sophy Rickett (born 1970), installation artist and photographer
- Edith Rimmington (1902–1986), surrealist artist, poet and photographer
- Grace Robertson (1930–2021), photojournalist contributing to Picture Post and Life in the 1950s
- Ellen Rogers (born 1983), portrait and fashion photographer
- Mary Rosse (1813–1885), began experimenting with photography in 1842

== S ==
- Jane Martha St. John (1801–1882), known for her 1856 calotypes of Rome and other towns in Italy, now in the J. Paul Getty Museum and the Metropolitan Museum of Art
- Jo Metson Scott
- Philippa Scott (1918–2010), wildlife photographer
- Helen Sear (born 1955), visual artist specialising in photography and moving image
- Pepita Seth (active since 2000s), known for her photographs of elephants
- Merlyn Severn (1897–1973), English photographer
- Pennie Smith (born c. 1949), black-and-white portraits, rock groups
- Stella Snead (1910–2006), surrealist painter, photographer and collage artist
- Pamela So (1947–2010), multimedia artist and photographer
- Sally Soames (1937–2019), newspaper photographer
- Jo Spence (1934–1992), known for her self-portraits depicting her fight against cancer
- Doreen Spooner (1928–2019), first female photographer on Fleet Street
- Marilyn Stafford (1925–2023), American-British photographer and photojournalist
- Hannah Starkey (born 1971), staged settings of women in city environments
- Jemima Stehli (born 1961), known for her naked self-portraits
- Hilary Stock (born 1964), fine art photographer
- Clare Strand (born 1973), conceptual photographer
- Maud Sulter (1960–2008), fine artist, photographer, writer and curator
- Ella Sykes (1863–1939), travel writer and photographer

== T ==
- Mitra Tabrizian (born 1959), professor of photography at the University of Westminster
- Anastasia Taylor-Lind (born 1981), photojournalist
- Sam Taylor-Wood (born 1967), art photography, portraits
- Anya Teixeira (1913–1992), founded the Creative Photo Group
- Eveleen Tennant (1856–1937), photographer, family and visitors
- Alys Tomlinson (born 1975), portrait and landscape photographer
- Tessa Traeger (born 1938), photographer, known for her still life and food photography
- Abbie Trayler-Smith, documentary and portrait photographer
- Amelia Troubridge (born 1974), portrait, documentary photographer
- Edith Tudor-Hart (1908–1973), photographer and Russian spy
- Emma Turner (1866–1940), pioneering bird photographer

== V ==
- Florence Vandamm (1883–1966), photographer of Broadway productions
- Vivienne (1889–1982), photographer, singer, writer

== W ==
- Maxine Walker (born 1962), focus on portraits of Black people
- Agnes Warburg (1872–1953), influential early colour photographer
- Gillian Wearing (born 1963), conceptual artist also working with photography, video and installations
- Alison Webster (died 2011), photojournalist
- Jeanie Welford (1854–1947), early commercial female photographer
- Janine Wiedel (born 1947), documentary photographer and visual anthropologist
- Jane Wigley (1820–1883), early photographer opening studios in Newcastle and London in the mid-1840s
- Dorothy Wilding (1893–1976), professional portrait photographer
- Val Wilmer (born 1941), writer-photographer specialising in jazz, gospel, blues, and British African-Caribbean music and culture
- Rhonda Wilson (1953–2014), women's activist, photographer and writer
- Vanessa Winship (born 1960), portraiture and landscapes, particularly in Turkey, Georgia and the US
- Olivia Wyndham (1897–1967), society photographer

== Y ==
- Catherine Yass (born 1963), bright colour, images often a combination of the positive and negative, subjects ranging from toilets to empty cinemas and Bollywood stars
- Madame Yevonde (1893–1975), pioneered colour in portrait photography, including a series of guests at a party dressed as Roman and Greek gods and goddesses

== See also ==
- List of women photographers
