= Mireille Delisme =

Haitian artist

Mireille Delismé (also known by her commercial artist name, Mireille Delice) is a Haitian drapo Vodou artist from Léogâne, Haiti.

== Biography ==
Delismé's career began in 1986, when she was taught sewing and beading techniques by her cousin, named either Myrlande Constant or Yolande Ceauston. Soon after, she began working alongside her cousin in Port-au-Prince at a factory embellishing wedding dresses for export. Following the closing of the factory in 1990 due to political and economic issues, Delismé recalls having a dream in which she was visited by the spirits. When relating the dream to her father, an oungan (vodou priest), he interpreted the message to be from the vodou spirit or lwa named Erzulie. Erzulie, the spirit of love, is represented in vodou tradition by a heart, which was the same design symbolized in Delismé's dream. Using beads left over from her time at the factory, the heart symbol visualized in her dream became the sequin design for her first drapo (flag).

Delismé recollects having more than one dream in which spirits visited her. During the third dream, she was delivered the message that, "I did not have to work in the factory, but I could learn to work for myself and earn for my family." In 1990, having lost her job at the factory in conjunction with the lwa messages, Delismé decided to begin her life as an independent artist at age 25. Delismé continued to master her needlework skills by creating more drapo, finding design inspiration from her dreams and vodou symbols given to her by her father. Much of Delismé's beadwork incorporates designs that represent traditional Vodou deities and are used to explain divinity and give clarity to life's expressions and meanings. Her flags represent her spirituality and are used for guidance, wisdom, and healing. Her bright color combinations within the sequins and beads add to the mood and spirit of each piece. Since becoming an independent artist, Delismé has built an atelier in Haiti. The workshop was constructed to more efficiently assemble the bead-work for her drapo designs. Delismé describes the envisioned designs to a paid artist to be drawn or traced for the drapo and once done, is passed on to be beaded by Delismé herself or one of her seven employed artists at the workshop.

In January 2010, Delismé's hometown was at the epicenter of a massive earthquake. Delisme and her family were among those affected by the earthquake's destruction. Although her home and workshop in the capital were safe, 18 miles away, Delisme stated, "I felt I had to express the disaster in Haiti in my artwork."

During the country's recovery, the Smithsonian—in collaboration with the people of Haiti, several national and international agencies, and the President's Committee on the Arts and the Humanities—coordinated the 2010 Folklife Festival. The festival was an effort to salvage, restore, and safeguard art treasures damaged or endangered by the earthquake. Several artists, including Delismé, participated in the event by demonstrating and selling their artwork in the Festival Marketplace.

In 2011, Delismé's work Catastrophe du 12 Janvier, a vodou flag created to depict the crumpled buildings and the bodies of the dead caused by the earthquake, was part of an annual exhibit at the Museum of International Folk Art titled "The Arts of Survival: Folk Expression in the Face of Natural Disaster." The exhibit explored how folk artists helped their communities recover from four natural disasters that occurred around 2011: The Haitian Earthquake, Hurricane Katrina, Pakistani floods, and the Mt. Merapi volcanic explosion in Indonesia. Also part of International Folk Arts Week, Delismé sold more of her pieces at her booth during the Santa Fe International Folk Arts Market. She said she shipped about 160 flags and carried more in her suitcase in preparation for the event.

== Principle expositions ==
- 2001 - Catastrophe du 12 Janvier, The Arts of Survival: Folk Expression in the Face of Natural Disaster, Museum of International Folk Art, Santa Fe, New Mexico
- 2012 - Haitian Art: Old Masters and New Visions, Indigo Arts Gallery, Philadelphia, Pennsylvania
- 2014 - "Onè… Respè!": Art from Haiti, Indigo Arts Gallery, Philadelphia, Pennsylvania

== Public collections ==
- Waterloo Center for the Arts
