= Marilyn Houlberg =

American anthropologist and photographer

Marilyn Jensen Houlberg (July 17, 1939 - June 29, 2012) was a professor, art historian, anthropologist, photographer, and curator. She was born and raised in Chicago, Illinois. Houlberg traveled extensively, conducting art historical and anthropological research in countries across the Caribbean and western Africa. She is known for curating exhibitions based on the religious icons and visual practices of Haitian Vodou and her anthropological research on the culture of the Yoruba people in southwestern Nigeria. Her photography archives and visual art collections are housed in various institutions throughout the United States. She was professor emeritus of Art History, Theory, and Criticism at the School of the Art Institute of Chicago, where she taught for over twenty years.

== Education ==
Houlberg earned an Associate degree from Wilbur Wright College (formerly Wright Junior College) before completing both a BFA (1963) and MAT (1967) at the University of Chicago. She later attended the University of London, where she earned an MPhil in 1973 after completing her thesis on Yoruba twin sculpture and ritual. The following year, she returned to Chicago and began teaching at the School of the Art Institute.

== Exhibitions ==
Houlberg began traveling to Haiti in the 1960s and organized multiple exhibitions of Haitian art both locally and in the U.S. Her work has formed the basis for a number of influential exhibitions and publications on Haitian Art. Her exhibitions include "Sacred Arts of Haitian Vodou," curated with long-time collaborator Donald Cosentino, which opened to enthusiastic reviews at the Fowler Museum at UCLA in 1995 before traveling to other museums, including the Field Museum of Natural History in Chicago and the American Museum of Natural History in New York City. Some exhibitions also opened in Port-au-Prince; in 1999, "Creative Inspiration: The Arts of Haitian Vodou," opened at Le Musee d'Art Haitien du College Saint Pierre in Pétion-Ville, which also housed the 2002 exhibition, "Haiti: Vodou Visionaries," before it traveled to Intuit: The Center for Intuitive and Outsider Art in Chicago. In another collaboration with Cosentino at the Fowler Museum, Houlberg helped to organize In Extremis: Death and Life in 21st-Century Haitian Art, alongside Patrick A. Polk, Leah Gordon, and Katherine Smith. In Extremis opened in September 2012, three months after Houlberg's passing.

== Archives and collections ==
The Marilyn Houlberg Collection at the Haitian Art Society houses works with religious and spiritual themes, such as depictions of lwa, saints, and ceremonies of Haiti, by artists including Myrlande Constant, Evelyne Alcide, and Yves Telemaque. The Marylin Houlberg Collection at the Indigo Arts Gallery in Philadelphia also includes the work of Haitian artists, as well as sculptural Yoruban figures.

Houlberg's photography can be found at the Smithsonian Institution. The Marilyn Houlberg Nigeria collections and Marilyn Houlberg Haiti Collection are part of the Eliot Elisofon Photographic Archives (EEPA) at the National Museum of African Art. These collections consist of color slides, prints, video, audio, field notes and other documentation of people, places, socio-cultural phenomena, and art historical practices, created over the course of Houlberg's decades-long career.

== Publications ==
- "Ibeji Images of the Yoruba", African Arts, Vol. 7 (1973)
- "Haitian Studio Photography: A Hidden World of Images". In Rebeecca Busselle, ed., Haiti: Feeding the Spirit (1992)
- (Introduction) Stephen Marc, The black trans-Atlantic experience: street life and culture in England, Ghana, Jamaica, and the United States (1992)
- Sacred Arts of Haitian Vodou (exhibition catalog, 1998)
- (Introduction) Phyllis Galembo, Vodou: Visions and Voices of Haiti (2005)

Houlberg also contributed several articles to periodicals such as African Arts and The New Observations Magazine.
