= Evelyn Alcide =

Haitian drapo Vodou artist

Evelyn Alcide (born 1969) is a Haitian drapo Vodou artist. Alcide studied under compatriot Myrlande Constant. Alcide often focuses her work on important Vodou religious figures. Her drapo are heavily beaded and have satin borders. Two of her flags depicting Lasirène were included in Mami Wata: Arts for Water Spirits in Africa and Its Diasporas a traveling exhibition originated at the Fowler Museum at UCLA that travelled to several venues including National Museum of African Art.

== Personal life ==
Alcide was born in Port-au-Prince in 1969.

== Collections ==
- Vodou Riche: Haitian Contemporary Art, CSpaces: Glass Curtain Gallery
- Drapo Vodou: Haitian Vodou Flags, Indigo Art Gallery
- Waterloo Center for the Arts, Waterloo, Iowa
- Fowler Museum at UCLA, Los Angeles
- Museum of International Folk Art, Santa Fe, New Mexico

== Notable works ==
- Ezrulie Mapiangue c. 2000-2010 This is a densely beaded flag with a blue satin border and signature in the bottom center. The flag depicts a black Madonna and child, an angel in the background, and other figures in the background.
- Saint Michel c. 2000-2010 This flag depicts Saint Micheal flying down to attack the devil with a scale in one hand and a sword in the other. There is a blue satin border around the densely beaded flag and there is a signature in the bottom left corner.
- Les Anges Secourisme Du Siesme c. 2014 (39" H X 47.5" W) Heavily beaded flag depicting vodou spirits helping people during and after the earthquake of 2010 in Haiti. There is a signature in the bottom left and a black satin border.
- Agoueh (date unknown) This flag is densely beaded with dark blue satin backing and border. There are two mermaids with colorful tails on either side of the flag. In the center is a figure with a goatee, tall hat, pointed shoes, and is standing in front of a boat.
- Aggou et Maitre Defile, (Date unknown)
- Séisme (Earthquake), 2010
- Baron Criminnel, (Date unknown)
- Guede Nibo, (Date unknown)
- Baron Brigite, (Date Unknown)
- La Siren Matennelle, (Date unknown)
