= Joseph Wilfrid Daleus =

Haitian artist (1949–2017)

Joseph Wilfrid Daleus (November 20, 1949 – December 10, 2017), sometimes called Joseph Daleus, or Wilfrid Daleus, was a Haitian painter born in Port-au-Prince, Haiti.

== Biography ==
Daleus was a completely self taught Haitian artist with no formal art training, beginning to paint before he was even a teenager and selling his first painting at the age of 10. It is said that Daleus would often credit God for his artistic abilities. He also owned his own gallery, Daleus Museum and Art Gallery, in northern Miami, Florida. And while Daleus painted a variety of subjects, always relating to Haiti, he also did a number of paintings specifically featuring Haitian vodou ceremonies. In 2017, Daleus died on December 10 at the Jackson Memorial Hospital in Miami, Florida at the age of 68 after battling complications with diabetes and respiratory problems.

== Public collections ==
- Voodoo Dance, 1981: Approximately seven women with their arms raised overhead dance around a male figure near the center of the painting. The women wear a combination of white, light purple, and dark purple clothing, including dresses, skirts, and headscarves. Several woman hold purple cloth in their hands, while others hold what could be glass bottles or Haitian maracas. The man in the center also holds one of these. He himself is dressed in dark, pinstriped pants, a suit jacket, and a black wide-brimmed hat. He has glasses, a dark beard, and a cane. Below him is a candle and white markings on the ground of a cross, as well as a skull and crossbones. In the bottom right corner, another man stands holding a drum between his legs. This piece of art is on display at the Waterloo Center for the Arts.

== Other works ==
- Grandmother Thinking
- Angelic Girls
- The Peaceful Jungle
- Dancers in the Dark
- The Girl with the Hair
- Peasant Farmer
- Modernist Conga Drum
- Carnival
- Bride and Groom
- Two Men by Waterfall

== Bibliography ==
- Cosentino, Donald. Sacred Arts of Haitian Vodou. Los Angeles, CA: UCLA Fowler Museum of Cultural History, 1995.
- Pataki, Eva. Haitian Painting: Art and Kitsch. Chicago, IL: Adams Press, 1986.
