= Emma Barton (disambiguation) =

Emma Barton (born 1977) is a British actress.

Emma Barton may also refer to:

- Emma Barton (photographer) (1872–1938), English portrait photographer
- Emma Barton (Emmerdale), soap opera character
