= Stephen Webster =

British jewellery designer

- Born: Stephen Webster; Gravesend, Kent, England
- Education: Medway College of Design
- Occupation: Jewelry designer
- Labels: Stephen Webster, Garrard
- Website: http://www.stephenwebster.com

Stephen Webster MBE (born 1959) is a British jewellery designer best known as founder of his eponymous jewellery brand.

== Biography ==
Born in Gravesend, Kent, Stephen Webster was educated at Gravesend Grammar School and later at the Medway College of Design (now the University for the Creative Arts, Rochester).

After completing his training under Tony Shepherd (himself a former Prime Warden of the Worshipful Company of Goldsmiths), Webster worked as a craftsman for several established London design houses. Among many highly regarded commissions was the honor, on two occasions, of setting the De Beers Diamond Stakes Trophy. After receiving the De Beers honour in 1982 (an accreditation that marked Webster's official passage into the fine jewellery trade) Webster relocated to Canada to design for an independent jeweler. Following a brief return to the UK in 1984, Webster identified a potential market for his jewellery in the US.

Webster returned to London in 1989 to establish Stephen Webster Ltd. The brand currently has over 200 points of sale worldwide and flagship stores in London, Beverly Hills, Moscow, St Petersburg and Kyiv.

In 2007, Webster was awarded an honorary Master of Arts degree from the University for the Creative Arts, and in 2013 Webster was appointed Member of the Order of the British Empire (MBE) in the New Year Honours for services to training and skills in the British jewellery industry.

In 2015, Webster published his autobiography Goldstruck: A Life Shaped by Jewellery. The book features photography by Rankin and Amelia Troubridge.
