= Charles Fréger =

French portrait photographer

Charles Fréger (born 1975) is a French portrait photographer.

== Education ==
Fréger was a student at the École supérieure d'art et design Le Havre-Rouen in Rouen.

== Life and work ==
He is best known for his series of photographic portraits of people in Uniform (national guards, French Foreign Legion, Sumo, skaters, Majorette, etc.), which play on the relationship between the signs of belonging to a group and the individuality of the wearer.

For Wilder Mann (2012), Fréger travelled across Europe to photograph the costumes and masks worn by people at the surviving pagan folk festivals that mark the coming of spring, winter or new year. For Bretonnes (2015), Fréger travelled throughout Brittany "making austere, formally beautiful portraits" of young women in traditional costumes and headwear.

Fréger is a founder of an international network of artists, Piece of Cake (POC).

== Publications ==
- Portraits photographiques et uniformes. Paris: 779 and Société française de photographie, 2001. ISBN 2-914573-00-6.
- Majorettes. Paris: Léo Scheer, 2002. ISBN 2-914172-33-8.
- Légionnaires. With an essay by Raphaëlle Stopin. Paris: 779 and Château d'eau, 2002. ISBN 2-914573-07-3.
- Donneurs. Preface by Pierre Etschegoyan. Ponctuation, 2002. ISBN 2-913179-05-3.
- Bleus de travail. With an essay by Marc Donnadieu. Rouen: POC, 2003. ISBN 2-915409-00-5.
- Steps. Cherbourg: POC / Le point du Jour, 2003. ISBN 2-912132-24-X.
- Le Froid, le gel, l'image : Merisotakoulu. With an essay by Jean-Paul Curnier. Paris: Léo Scheer, 2003. ISBN 2-915280-06-1.
- Rikishi. With an essay by Chihiro Minato. Rouen: POC, 2004. ISBN 2-915409-04-8.
- 2Nelson. With an essay by Bill Kouwenhoven. Rouen: POC, 2005. ISBN 2-915409-05-6.
- Lux. With essays by Stéphane Bern and Didier Mouchel. Veenman, 2007. ISBN 2-919923-13-7.
- Les Fleurs du paradis. With an essay by Fréger. Villa Noailles/archibook, 2008.
- Empire. With an essay by Prosper Keating. Paris: Thames & Hudson, 2010.
- Wilder Mann
  - Wilder Mann: the Image of the Savage. Stockport, UK: Dewi Lewis, 2012. With an introduction by Robert McLiam Wilson and an essay from the International Museum of Carnival Masks in Belgium. English language edition.
  - Thames & Hudson. French language edition.
  - Kehrer. German language edition.
  - Peliti. Italian language edition.
  - Seigensha. Japanese language edition.
- Outremer. Villa Noailles/Archibook, 2013.
- L-12-12. Göttingen, Germany: Steidl, 2013.
- La Danse du lion. Fotokino, 2014. ISBN 978-2-9530742-4-6. Flipbook.
- Bretonnes. With a foreword by Marie Darrieussecq and detailed texts by Yann Guesdon.
  - Portraits in Lace: Breton Women. Thames & Hudson, 2015. ISBN 9780500517994. English language edition.
  - Arles: Actes Sud, 2015. ISBN 978-2-330-05044-3.
- Yokainoshima
  - Yokainoshima: Island of Monsters. Thames & Hudson, 2016. ISBN 9780500544594. English language edition.
  - Yokainoshima: Célébration d'un bestiaire nippon. Arles: Actes Sud, 2016. ISBN 978-2-330-06470-9. French language edition.
  - Yokai no shima. Seigensha. ISBN 978-4-86152-529-2. Japanese language edition.
  - Yokainoshima: Rituali di maschere giapponesi. ISBN 9788889412718. Peliti. Italian language edition.
- Parade, les éléphants peints de Jaipur. Paris: grandes personnes, 2017. ISBN 978-2361935078.
- Cimarron: Freedom and Masquerade. Thames & Hudson, 2020. ISBN 9780500022467. English language edition.
- Souvenir D'alsace. Musée historique de Strasbourg, 2023. ISBN 9782351252154.
- Aam Aastha
  - Aam Aastha: Indian Devotions. Thames & Hudson, 2023. With essays by Anuradha Roy and Catherine Clement. ISBN 9780500024980.
  - Aam Aastha: Incarnations et divinités en Inde. Arles: Actes Sud, 2023. ISBN 978-2-330-17514-6.

== Exhibitions ==
- Aam Aastha, Église Saint-Martin d'Arles, Rencontres d'Arles, Arles, France, 2023

== See also ==
- Phyllis Galembo
- Leah Gordon
- Homer Sykes
