= Phyllis Galembo =

American photographer (born 1952)

Phyllis Galembo (born 1952) is an American photographer living in New York City.

She has published seven monographs, including, Pale Pink (1983), Vodou: visions and voices of Haiti (1998), Divine inspiration: from Benin to Bahia (1993), Dressed for thrills: 100 years of Halloween costumes & masquerade (2002), Maske (2016), Mexico: Masks, Rituals (2019), and Sodo (2021).

Phyllis Galembo taught studio photography at the State University of New York, Albany, and is now a Professor Emeritus of Studio Art in the Department of Art & Art History.

Galembo received a Senior Fulbright Research Award in 1993–94; was a New York Foundation for the Arts Fellow in 1996, 2010 and 2016; and was a Guggenheim Foundation Fellow in 2014.

== Education ==
Galembo earned an MFA from the University of Wisconsin at Madison in 1977.

== Publications ==
- Pale pink (1983)
- Aso-ebi, Cloth of the Family (1997), sponsored by New York Council for the Arts
- Divine inspiration: from Benin to Bahia (1993, 1998)
- Dressed for thrills: 100 years of Halloween costumes & masquerade (2002)
- Vodou: visions and voices of Haiti (2005)
- Maske (2010, 2016)
- Phyllis Galembo: Mexico, Masks and Rituals (2019)
- Sodo, Datz (2021)

== Awards ==
- 1993–94: Senior Fulbright Research Award, Fulbright Association
- 1996, 2010, 2016: New York Foundation for the Arts Fellow
- 2014: Guggenheim Fellowship from the John Simon Guggenheim Memorial Foundation

== Exhibitions ==
=== Solo exhibitions ===
- 1993: Divine Inspiration: From Benin To Bahia, Photographs By Phyllis Galembo, International Center of Photography. Work illustrating the religious traditions of Nigeria and the spiritual practices of Brazil introduced from Africa via the slave trade.
- 1998: Kings, Chiefs, and Women of Power: Images from Nigeria, American Museum of Natural History
- 2005: Sepia International
- 2007: West African Masquerade: Photographs by Phyllis Galembo, Tang Museum, Skidmore College, Saratoga Springs, curated by Ian Berry
- Phyllis Galembo: Maske was exhibited at Steven Kasher Gallery in N.Y.C. in 2011

=== Group exhibitions or during festivals ===
- 2013: The Encyclopedic Palace at the 55th Venice Biennale, curated by Massimiliano Gioni
- 2020 Galembo's work was exhibited at the Boca Raton Museum of Art in a show entitled Phyllis Galembo: Maske.

== Collections ==
Galembo's works is held in the following permanent collections:

- Mead Art Museum at Amherst College
- Museum of Fine Arts, Houston
- Metropolitan Museum of Art
- Wisconsin Union Art Collection

== See also ==
- Charles Fréger
- Leah Gordon
- Homer Sykes

== General references ==
- Nnadi, Chioma (March 2010). "Phyllis Galembo captures the magic in the masquerade" (PDF). Fader.
- Voon, Claire (2016-04-22). "A Photographic Survey of Africa's Enduring Masquerade Traditions". Hyperallergic.
- "Tangible Spirits". National Geographic. April 2012. Archived from the original on August 9, 2020.
