= Haitian Vodou art =

Art related to the Vodou religion of Haiti

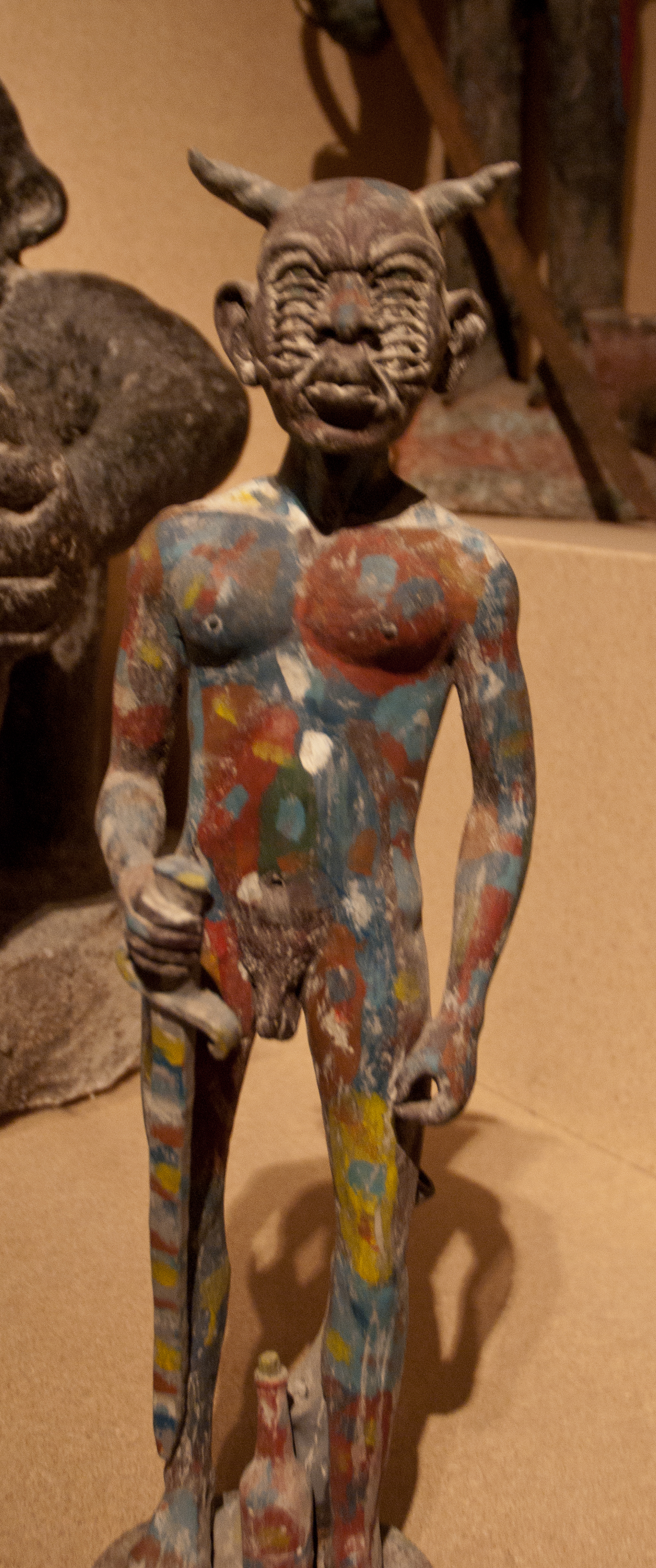
- Haitian Vodou fetish statue of a devil with twelve eyes
- Location: Haiti

Haitian Vodou art is art related to the Haitian Vodou religion. This religion has its roots in West African traditional religions brought to Haiti by slaves, but has assimilated elements from Europe and the Americas and continues to evolve. The most distinctive Vodou art form is the drapo Vodou, an embroidered flag often decorated with sequins or beads, but the term covers a wide range of visual art forms including paintings, embroidered clothing, clay or wooden figures, musical instruments and assemblages. Since the 1950s there has been growing demand for Vodou art by tourists and collectors.

== Origins and history ==
Art historians disagree on the origins of Haitian Vodou arts. Suzanne Blier makes the case that they come from the coastal areas of Benin and Togo. Robert Farris Thompson makes a plausible connection with Central Africa based on similarities with nkisi figures from the Kongo, and cosmograms, flags, drums and dances from that region.

The first slaves from West and Central Africa were brought to the Caribbean in the 16th century. Europeans often claimed that the slaves were being rescued from devil worship. However, the slaves maintained their religious practices in secret, and their priests were among the leaders of the first revolt in Haiti in 1791. Haiti became the first independent nation of African people in the Western Hemisphere in 1804 under President Jean-Jacques Dessalines. The traditional religion continued to be banned, and as late as the 1940s the Catholic church undertook a campaign against Vodou, ransacked temples and burned religious artifacts. Many of the techniques of sacred art have now been forgotten, and few sculptures were being made by 2001. The Vodou religion was finally recognized officially in 2002.

The great majority of Haitians still practice the Vodou (Note: The word Vodou means spirit.) religion. The religion continues to evolve, and in addition to the traditional West African lwo (spirits) it now includes the spirits of heroes of resistance to the colonial forces, and spirits of powerful religious leaders. The iconography of the Haitian Vodou religion combines elements from Africa, Europe and the Americas. Thus a drapo made for an African spirit may include an image of a Catholic saint. The saint's image was originally in part designed to deceive Catholic missionaries, but also was chosen in recognition of similarity between the saint and the lwa. Since then the saint and the spirit have become syncretized.

== Interpretation ==
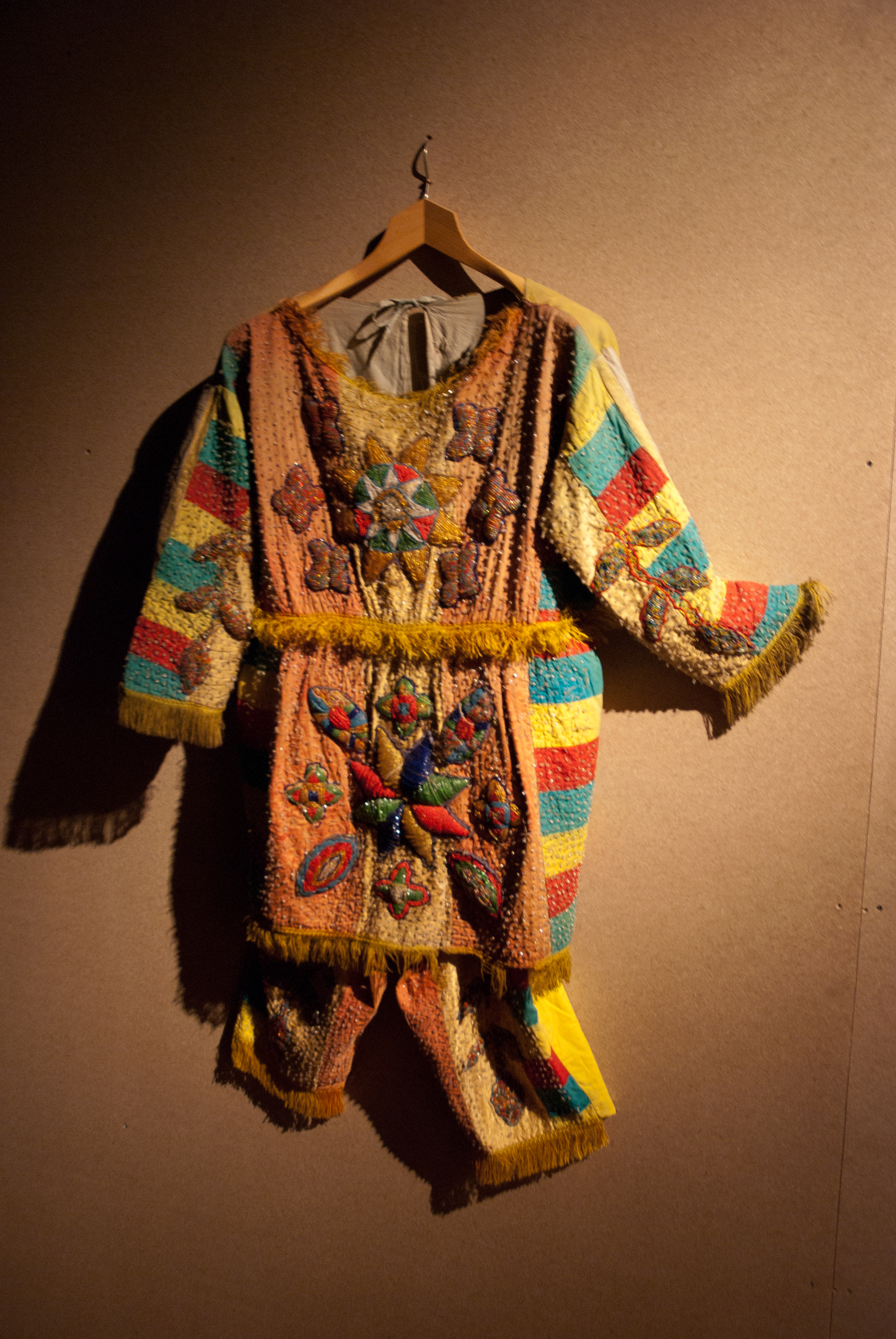
Antique ceremonial suit for Haitian Vodou rites

Vodou art can be difficult to classify in Western terms. Rachel Beauvoir-Dominique, writing of Marianne Lehmann's (Note: Marianne Lehmann is a former Swiss diplomat who made her home in Port au Prince, Haiti, where she collected about 2,000 examples of Haitian sacred art over a twenty year period. UNESCO has contributed some funds towards indexing and photographing the collection, which includes musical instruments, figures dressed in costumes and other artifacts.) Vodou art collection, notes that "even today, the Creole language does not possess any word to designate what Western civilization qualifies as 'art'." Poet and critic André Breton dismissed Haitian art, noting that Haiti had no museums or art collections. He apparently saw no value in the art associated with the "backward" Vodou religion.

Some scholars distinguish narrative Haitian art, which may include depictions of events or ceremonies in which there are many images from Vodou, from "Vodou art" in the sense of art that has a sacred function. The latter would be designed for use in ceremonies or for placement in temples or on altars. Given the omnipresence of Vodou in Haiti, most narrative art would also include Vodou images. However, the fluid and adaptive nature of Vodou makes it hard to clearly distinguish religion, art and religious art.

Alessandra Benedicty points out that Western scholars are led by their postmodern intellectual framework into trying to explain Vodou art in terms of "intellectual truths". Vodou is open-ended and sometimes purposely dissimulates. Benedicty writes that in "the Vodou/Haitian aesthetic system, the objet d'art nurtures ambivalence and demands that the reader or the spectator interpret and thus participate in the production of an artistic text's meaning." If there is a veve in the work, there is a possibility that the lwa the work was made for will possess the viewer. The purchaser of a Vodou altar or other artwork may be possessed by their purchase. A 1995 exhibit at the Fowler Museum of Cultural History in California of "The Sacred Arts of Haitian Vodou" included dramatic ritual interactions between Vodouists and lwa that may have included possession.

== Drapo ==
A drapo Vodou is a handmade flag, typically embroidered and decorated with beads and sequins. Although flags may have been made in West Africa before the arrival of Europeans, the flags widely used there by 1600 were derived from European flags. They were used as symbols of ethnic, military or religious allegiance. The drapo Vodou also drew on Yoruba beadwork, Catholic vestments and Masonic aprons. In the 19th century and early 20th century most drapo Vodou were made from one or two colored fabric pieces decorated with embroidery, metal bangles and glass beads, with an image of the lwa made of shiny fabrics appliquéd to the cloth using techniques still followed in West Africa. Flags and banners used in the 21st century in rural areas often still have stylistically simple designs, in part due to the high cost of decorative material.

With the older flags the background field that frames the image was usually decorated with widely spaced sequins or beads. Modern flag makers often completely cover the fabric of the field with sparkling sequins of one color, or with intricate geometrical patterns. Borders, which were either simple or did not exist on early drapo Vodou, have evolved into highly elaborate patterns. The use of sequins in modern drapos dates to 1940, when Joseph Fortine saw a troupe of Afro-Brazilian samba dancers wearing sequin costumes in a Carnival parade. Fortine began to decorate the costumes of Rara band players with sequins, and in 1943 made a drapo Vodou for Damballa from a burlap coffee sack which he stretched on a wooden frame. He made the image from sequin lines on a satin background, and added random sequins surrounding the image. Fortine taught his techniques to sequin artists such as Edgard Jean Louis, Sylva Joseph, Clotaire Bazile, and Yves Telemak. The youngest of these, Telemak, was the first to sign his work.

There are two kinds of drapo Vodou. The drapo servis are made for ceremonial use, and art flags are made for sale.

=== Drapo servis ===
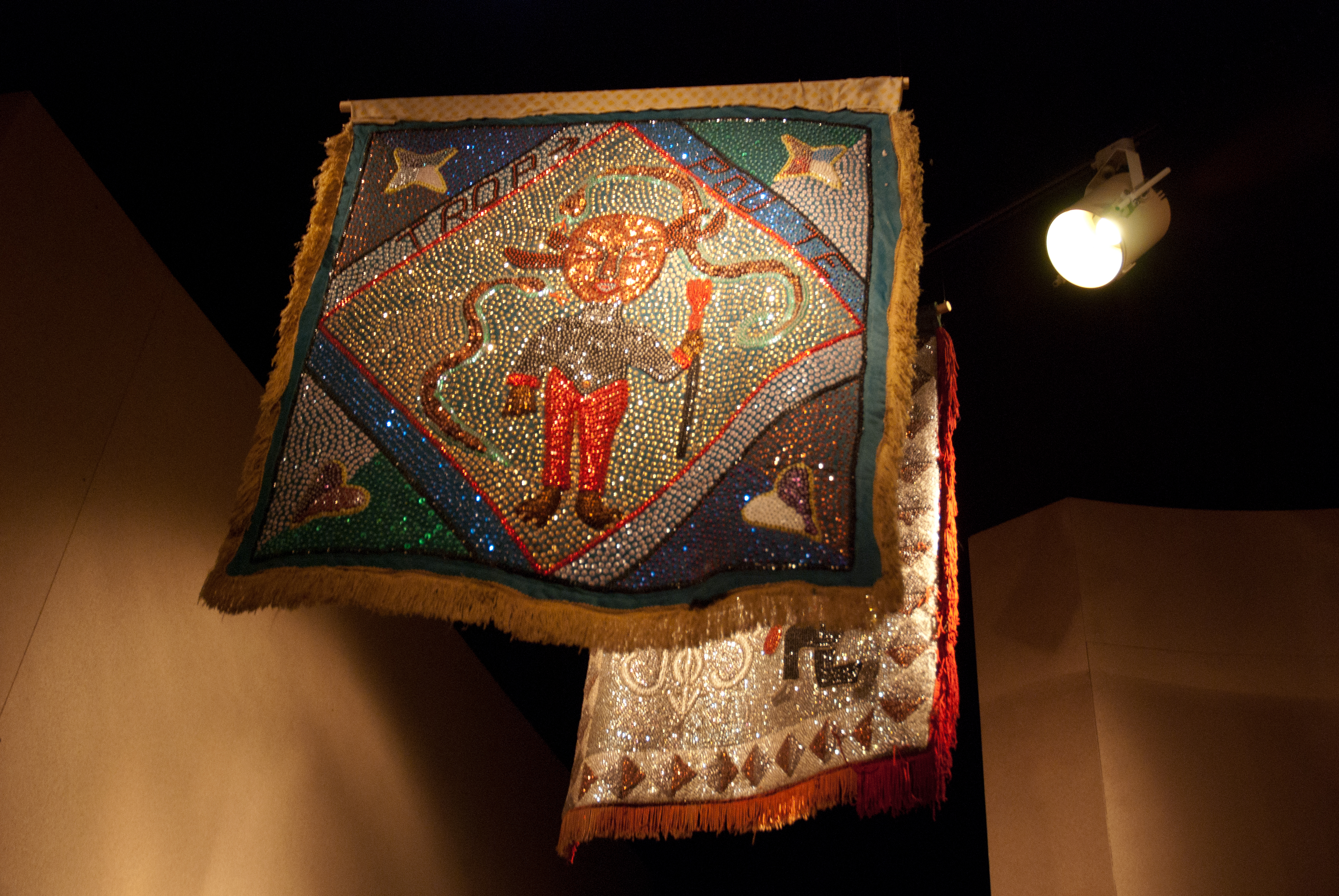
Haitian Vodou drapos. The front flag is for Trop Pou Te.

The drapo servis are important religious icons. They are kept in shrine rooms, and carried by flag bearers in elaborate ceremonies in the main chamber of the temple. A drapo servis will include an image of a Catholic saint or a vèvè (trace-work emblem) of an lwa (Note: The lwas serve as intermediaries between humans and the supreme god.) (spirit) such as Papa Legba or Ogun of the Yoruba religion. There are many lwas, including Erzulie, Gede, Damballa and La Sirene. The purpose of a ceremonial drapo is to flatter the lwa in the hope of gaining favor in return. Usually drapo servis are made in pairs, for example representing Ogun and Damballa. Ogun was the lwa who led the slaves to freedom, and Damballa is the snake, representing the life force. Ogun may be paired with other lwas.

A drapo servis will have a central image surrounded by a diamond-shaped border, will often have a fringe, and will be 36 by 36 inches (910 by 910 mm) in size. The image may depict a Catholic saint associated with an lwa or may be a veve that represents the lwa symbolically and provides a gateway for it to enter the world of humans. The image may be a chromolithograph, a vividly colored paper image from Italy, Mexico or Spain of a Catholic saint that has been syncretized with the corresponding African spirit of the drapo. The image may be an outline of the saint traced from a chromolithograph, or may be a detailed and faithful copy of a chromolithograph in beads and sequins.

The most widely used images of saints are those of Saint Isidore, Saint James Major, Saint Patrick and the Holy Virgin. Veves include the ship of Agwé, the cemetery cross of Baron Samedi, the crossroads of Legba and so on. An image of a mermaid is used on flags for the water spirit LaSiren. This does not derive from veve or Catholic origins, but seems to have come from European nautical sources. The image of a fish is important in Vodou as in Christian art, but the Vodou symbol comes from Fon mythology rather than Christianity. It represents Agwé, who corresponds to the Fon sea deity Agbê. Agbê took the shape of a fish when he was given responsibility for the sea.

=== Art flags ===
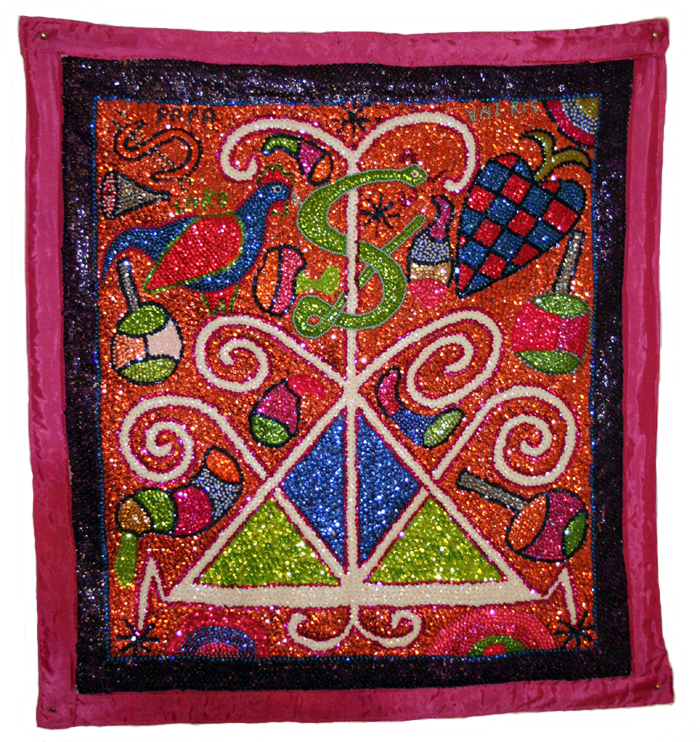
Flag by George Valris

Art flags show much wider variation in size and theme than drapo servis, and rarely have a fringe. Some flags are closer to tapestries. In the 1950s collectors started to buy drapo Vodou, and the oungan (priests) began to make them for sale as a source of income. The next generation of artists, active in the 1990s, included Eviland Lalanne, Joseph Oldof Pierre, Le Petit Frere Mogirus, Wagler Vital, Georges Valris, Roland Rockville, Ronald Gouin, and Antoine Oleyant. They introduced various innovations, in part driven by the shortage of materials for flagmaking. Antoine Oleyant has been called "the artist who really brought the flags into the realm of fine art."

In Port-au-Prince the skilled drapo artists have ready access to beads and sequins brought in from Canada and the United States. These artists earn their living from sales to tourists and to art galleries. In the 21st century there have been considerable changes to drapo Vodou as an art-form, in which artists such as Myrlande Constant (Note: Myrlande Constant, born in 1970, was taught seamstress and beading techniques by her mother, and worked in a factory making wedding dresses. She taught herself flagmaking, using beads rather than sequins, and has since become internationally recognized.) have introduced new themes and techniques. Other contemporary drapo artists include Evelyn Alcide, Roudy Azor, Gabriel Chery, Lindor Chiler, Mireille Delice, Christian Dorleus and Josiane Joseph. Their large and elaborate drapo represent in greater details the interactions with the lwas in events such as Vodou ceremonies and weddings. They may also represent evangelical Christian themes, or have secular subjects. Edgard Jean Louis, a well-known flagmaker, made a flag called "Diana Erzulie" that included a photograph of the English Princess Diana. There is growing demand for such drapo by international art collectors.

== Other objects ==
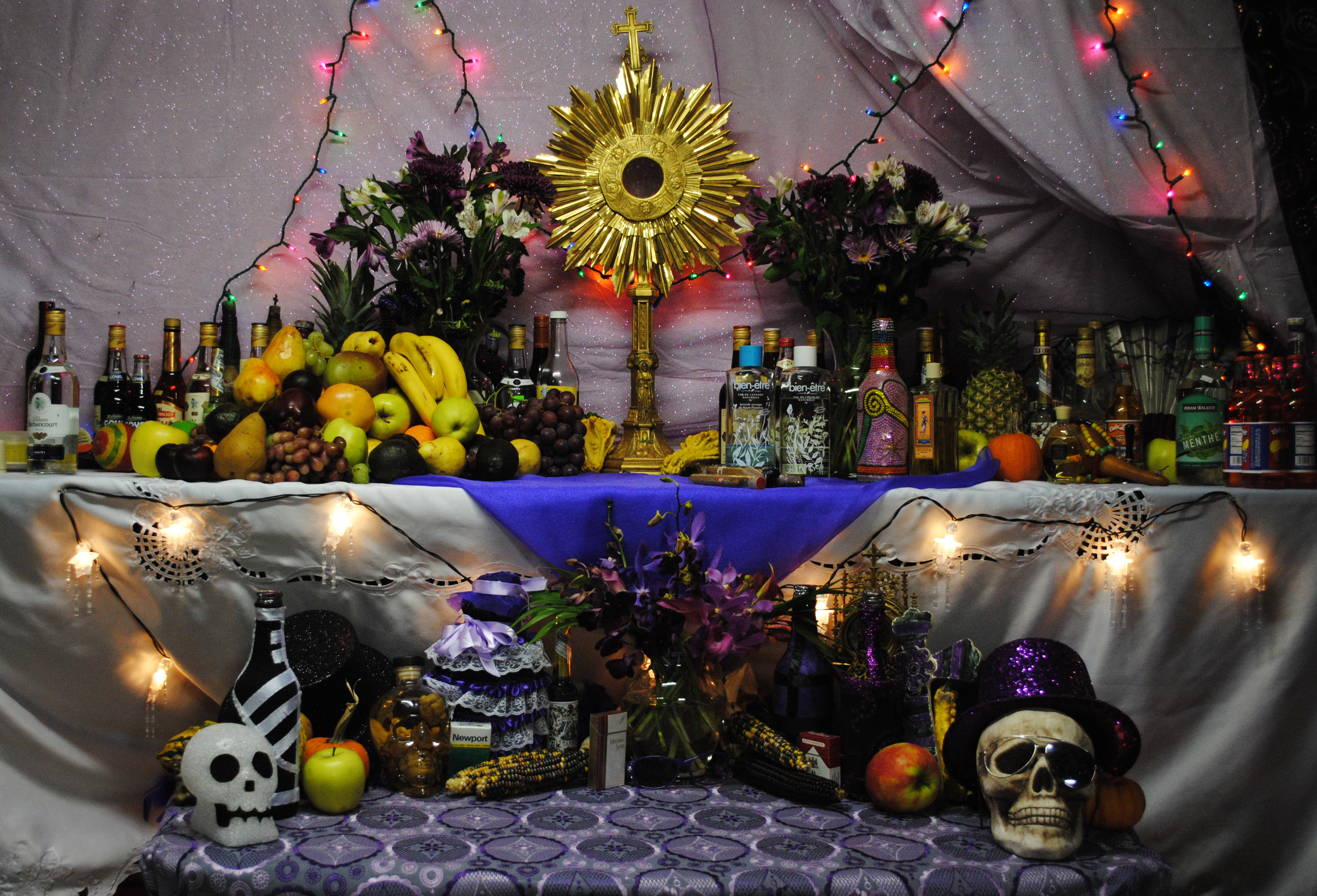
Altar to Petwo, Rada, and Gede spirits; 2010

In the 1940s Haitian professional artists began to create imitations of images provided by foreign entrepreneurs. The images represented the foreigners' view of the essence of Vodou art. This interaction was later dismissed and the Haitian works were stated to be authentic. In 1949 fifteen artists decorated the Episcopal Saint Trinite Cathedral in Port-au-Prince with murals that contrast Vodou art and traditional scenes from the bible. Thirteen of the artists were Catholics and/or Vodouists. In the 1950s the murals became world famous. African gods were found in the symbolism of Christian images. Thus the "Damballah Virgin" by Andre Dimanche was identified as Erzulie, a lwa connected to Aphrodite, Mater Dolorosa, health and an angry Madonna.

A doll incorporated in a work of Vodou art can be animated so it can perform supernatural work, protecting the home. The Haitian Vodou priest Georges René explains the process, saying "anything can do mystique if you believe in it... you have to turn it into mystic. You baptize it. You make a ceremony. You put the food the lwa eats... after that you can work with it. It gets a soul. You can put it on an altar."

Pierrot Barra (1942–99) and Marie Cassaise made sacred altar installations from everyday objects such as dolls, sunglasses, sequins, speedometers, rosaries, mirrors and tinsel. Barra said his work was inspired by the Vodou spirits, who sometimes demanded it. He said, "When I sleep, while I'm dreaming, I see the Mysteries. When I sleep I see the spirits...they show me a design, some face, some kind of thing. Then when I wake up I create it." A visitor to Port-au-Prince in 1991 described an altar installation Barra made for the mother goddess Ezili Dantor. Her head came from a plaster doll, with rouge, lipstick and white synthetic hair. She held a cutout picture of the baby Jesus, which represented the goddess's daughter Anais. A red fabric snake was wrapped round the body of the goddess, and a small rubber baby doll was at the foot of the statue. The whole was decorated with sparkles and cheap jewelry. This was not a traditional design, but was immediately recognized by Vodouists as authentic Vodou art.

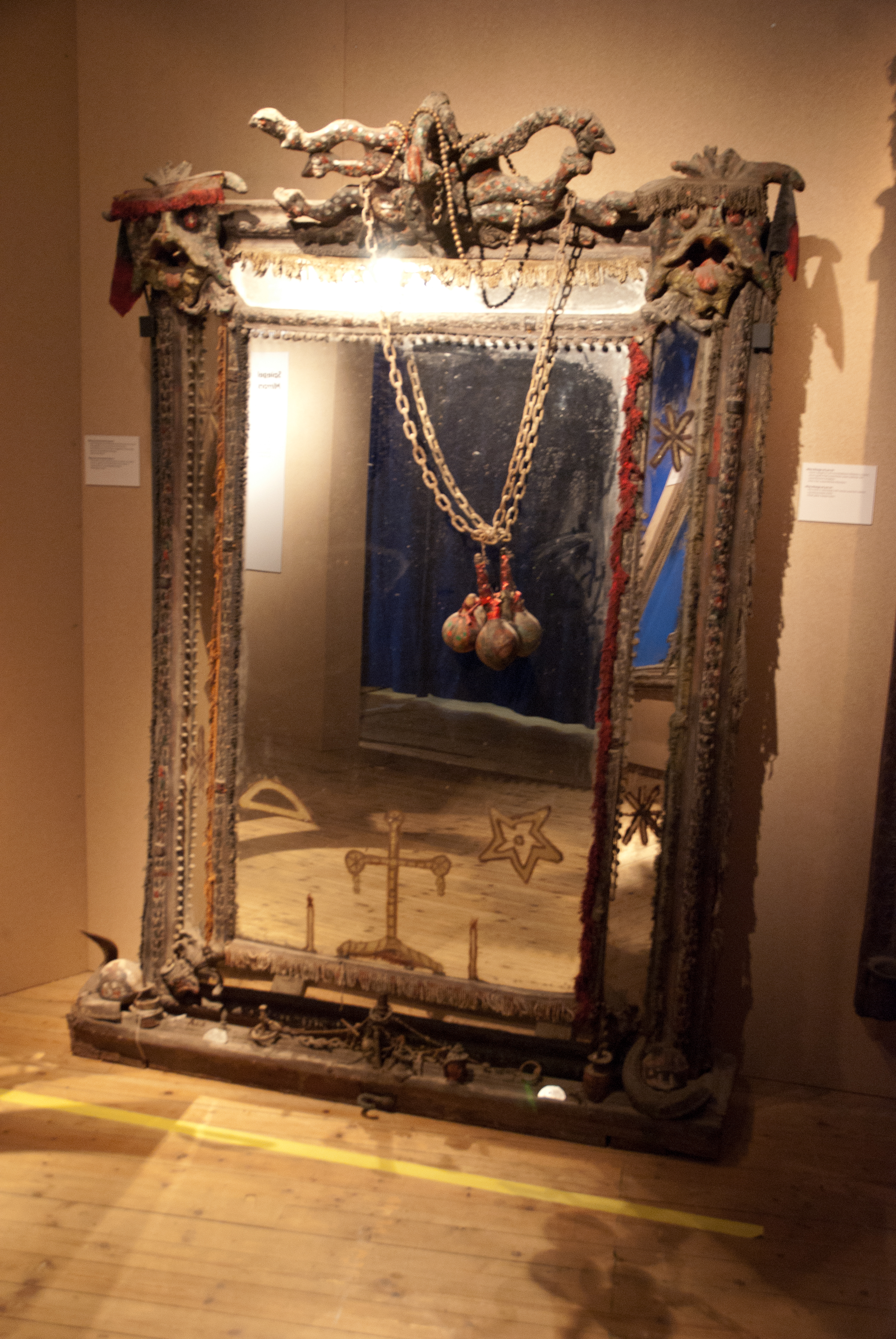
Decorated mirror

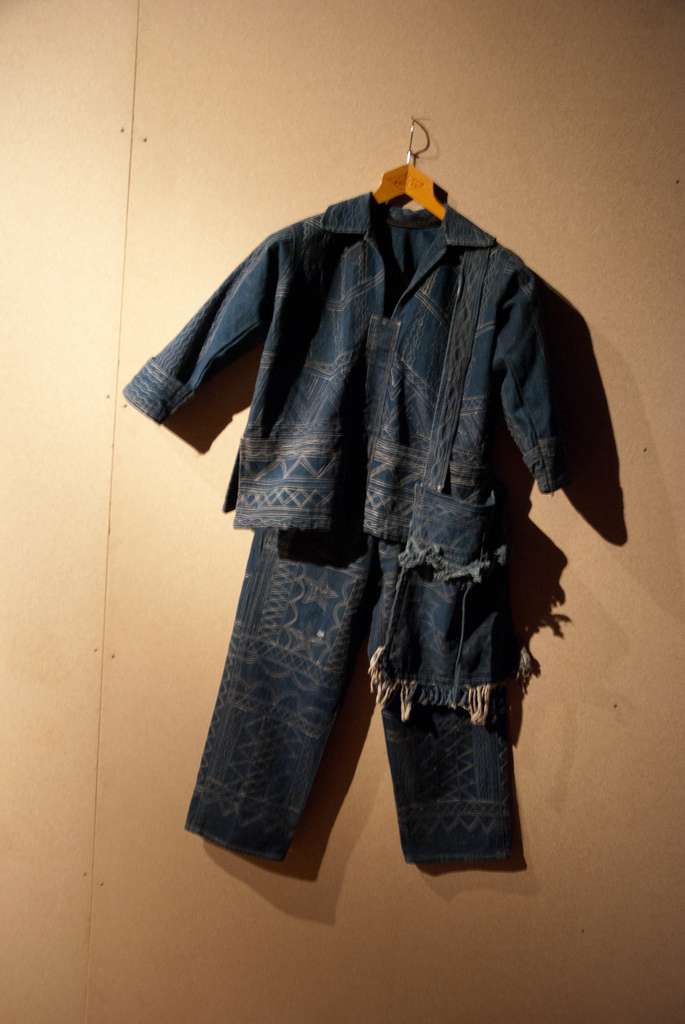
Antique ceremonial suit

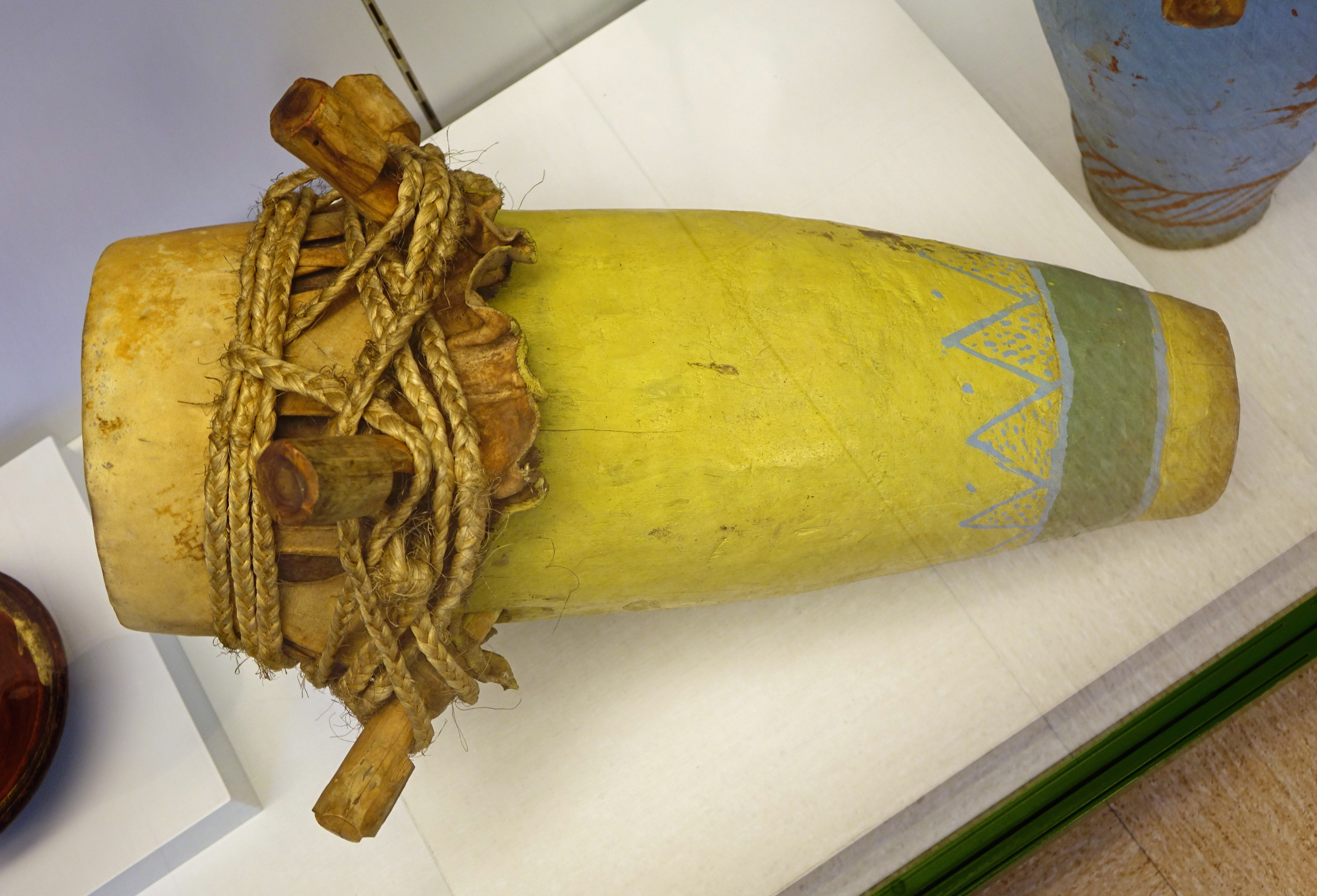
Ceremonial drum

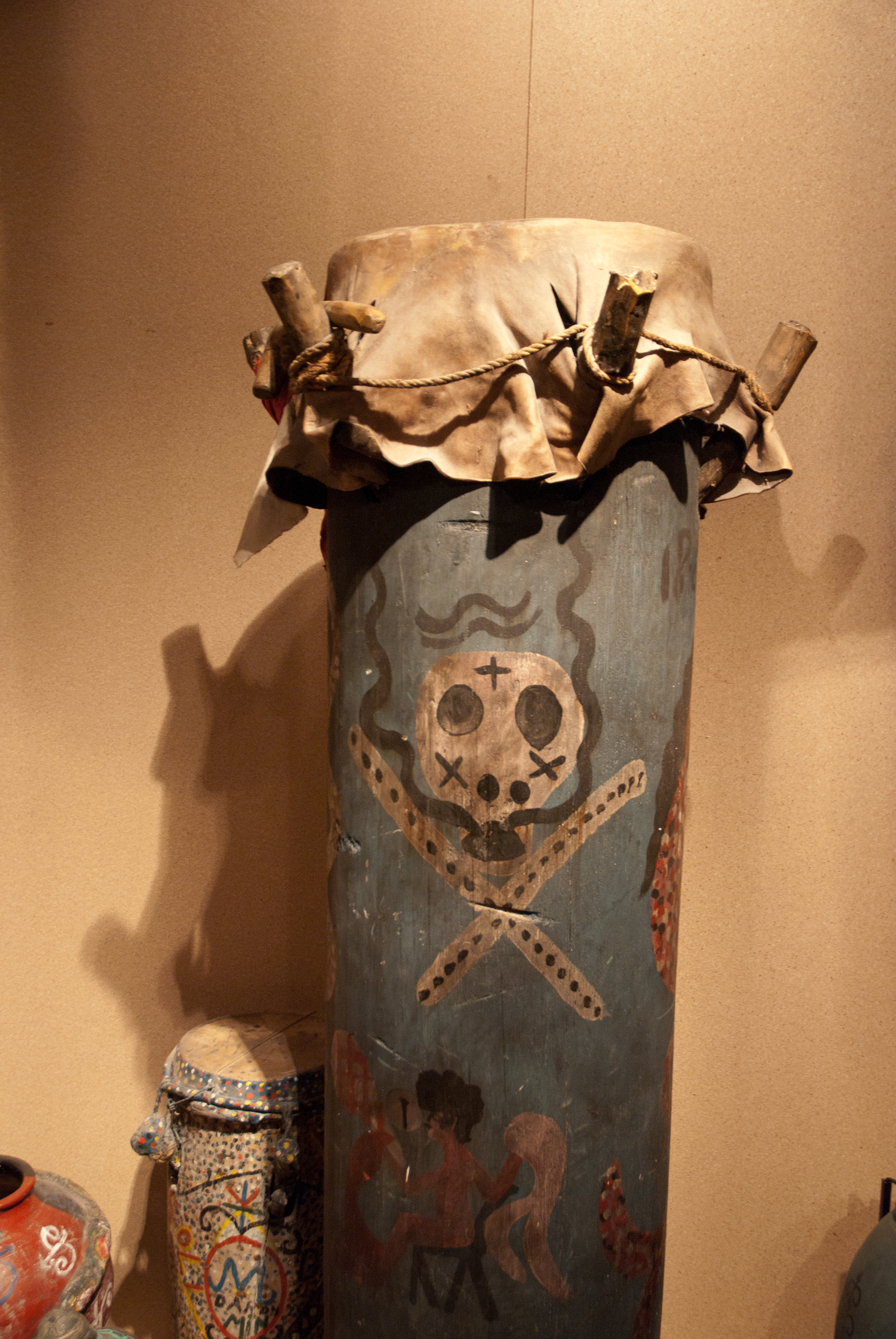
Antique ceremonial drum

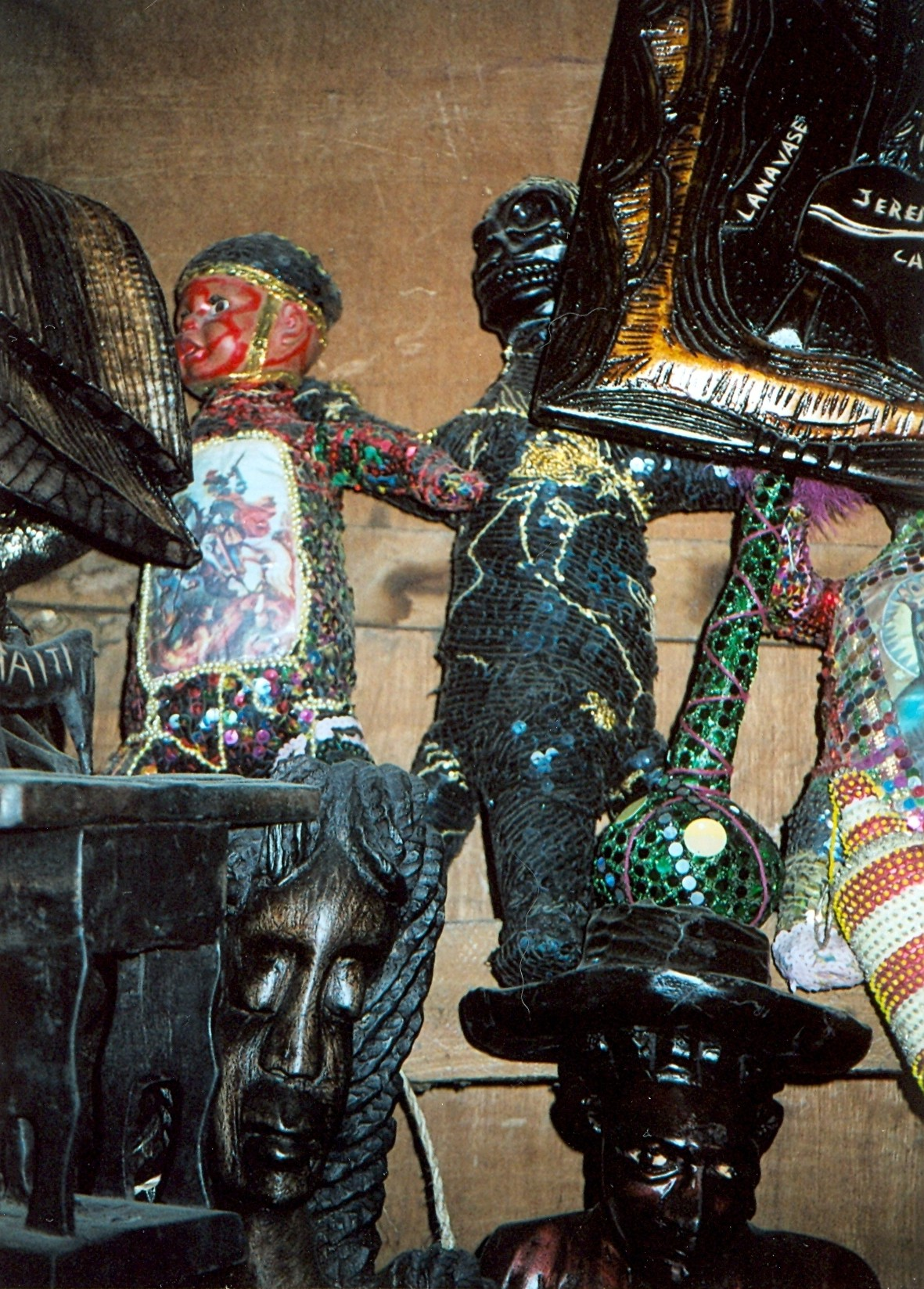
Vodou paraphernalia in the Marché en Fer, Port-au-Prince

== Sources ==
- Apter, Andrew; Derby, Lauren (2009-12-14). Activating the Past: History and Memory in the Black Atlantic World. Cambridge Scholars Publishing. ISBN 978-1-4438-1790-5.
- Benedicty-Kokken, Alessandra (2014-11-12). Spirit Possession in French, Haitian, and Vodou Thought: An Intellectual History. Lexington Books. ISBN 978-0-7391-8466-0.
- Cosentino, Donald (1998). Vodou Things: The Art of Pierrot Barra and Marie Cassaise. Univ. Press of Mississippi. ISBN 978-1-57806-014-6.
- Cosentino, Donald J. (Winter 1999). "In Memoriam: Pierrot Barra, 1942-1999". African Arts. 32 (4). UCLA James S. Coleman African Studies Center: 16–17. JSTOR 3337665.
- Cosentino, Donald (2013). "Sacred Symbols in Sequins: Vintage Haitian Vodou Flags". Richard F. Brush Art Gallery, St. Lawrence University. Archived from the original on 2015-05-30.
- Crown, Carol; Rivers, Cheryl; Wilson, Charles Reagan (2013-06-03). The New Encyclopedia of Southern Culture: Volume 23: Folk Art. UNC Press Books. ISBN 978-1-4696-0799-3.
- Desmangles, Leslie Gérald (1992). The Faces of the Gods: Vodou and Roman Catholicism in Haiti. Univ of North Carolina Press. ISBN 978-0-8078-4393-2.
- "Drapo Vodou : Spirit Flags". Haitian Art Company. Archived from the original on 2015-05-30.
- Glover, Kaiama L. (2010). Haiti Unbound: A Spiralist Challenge to the Postcolonial Canon. Liverpool University Press. ISBN 978-1-84631-499-5.
- Harvey, Graham (2014-09-11). Food, Sex and Strangers: Understanding Religion as Everyday Life. Routledge. ISBN 978-1-317-54633-7.
- Hodgson, Martin (8 September 2001). "An unlikely crusader fights to save the voodoo soul of Haiti". The Guardian. Port-au-Prince.
- Polk, Patrick Arthur (1997). Haitian Vodou Flags. Univ. Press of Mississippi. ISBN 978-1-57806-024-5.
- Richman, Karen E. (Spring 2008). "Innocent Imitations? Authenticity and Mimesis in Haitian Vodou Art, Tourism, and Anthropology". Ethnohistory. 55 (2): 203–227. doi:10.1215/00141801-2007-061.
- "Sequin Flags of Haiti". Ridge Art. Archived from the original on 2015-05-30.
- Thomas, R. Murray (2014-06-19). Roots of Haiti's Vodou-Christian Faith: African and Catholic Origins: African and Catholic Origins. ABC-CLIO. ISBN 978-1-4408-3204-8.
- Ulysse, Gina Athena (2011-04-14). "Constant: Haiti's Fiercest Flag Bearer". Huffington Post.
- Vanhee, Hein (2002). "Central African Popular Christianity and the Making of Haitian Vodou Religion". Central Africans and Cultural Transformations in the American Diaspora. Cambridge University Press. ISBN 978-0-521-00278-3.
