= Cathleen Naundorf =

German artist (born 1968)

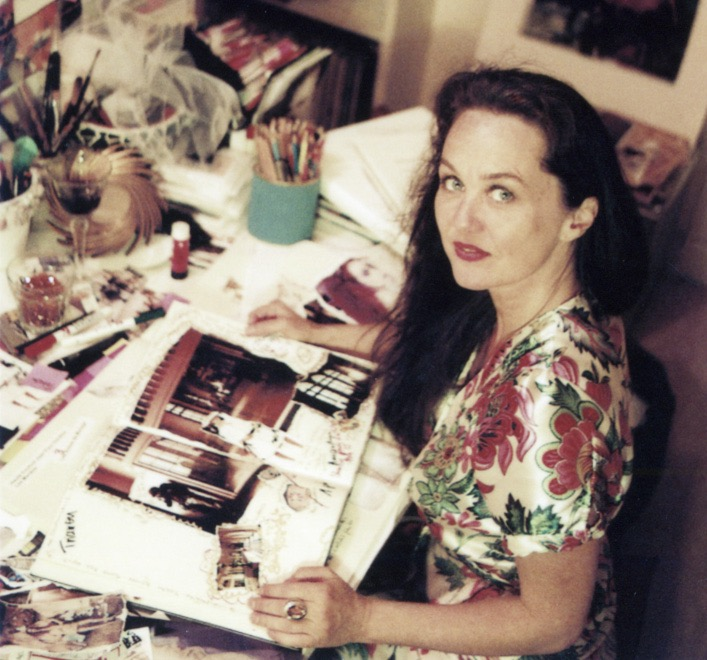
- Born: Weissenfels, Germany
- Occupation: Fine Art Photographer
- Website: https://cathleennaundorf.com/

Cathleen Naundorf (born 13 April 1968 in Weißenfels) is a contemporary artist and fine art photographer. She lives in Paris and London.

== Life ==
Born in Weißenfels, Naundorf moved from the German Democratic Republic to the Federal Republic of Germany in 1985. From 1990 to 1992 she studied in Munich at the Municipal College for Design with a focus on graphics, painting and photography.

From 1990, Naundorf assisted in photography studios in Munich, Berlin, Paris, New York City and Singapore. In the early 1990s, she traveled on behalf of different book publishers as a reportage photographer.

From 1989, Naundorf focused her creative interest and art direction in fashion photography commuting between projects in New York City and Paris.

In 1998 she settled permanently in Paris and opened her studio and a second studio in London 2015.

== Photography ==
Her early work as a reportage photographer concentrated on ethnic groups in Central and East Asia and South America. She lived and worked with indigenous peoples like the Yanomami, Mongols and Kazakhs in the Altai Highlands and with shamans in Yakutia, Siberia. Her photographs have been published in National Geographic, GEO and Globo.

In the end of the 1980s Naundorf met the fashion photographer Horst P. Horst in New York, who became her mentor. In 1997, she began to photograph backstage for Condé Nast during various Paris fashion shows.

Naundorf worked on photo series with the working title "Un rêve de mode", focussing on Haute couture fashion houses such as Dior, Chanel, Valentino, Gaultier, Elie Saab and Armani.

A collaboration with the Réunion des Musées Nationaux led to photo series staged at the Grand Palais, at the National Museum of Natural History as well as series at Château de Malmaison. The works fuse French historical architecture with Parisian fashion themes. From 2010, Naundorf worked with the Musée Rodin in Paris, and at the Musée Rodin de Meudon.

She collaborated several times with the interior designer Didier Gomez and the Sofitel Paris Hotel, as well as with Parisian jewellers. Since 2012 Naundorf has been working with Valentino Garavani on various projects such as "An Italian Story - Au Chateau de Wideville" and the campaign for Valentino's Somerset House exhibition "Valentino: Master of Couture". Several projects with the Victoria and Albert Museum followed in 2014 like for the exhibition "Horst - Photographer of Style".

Since 2000 she works among others for Vogue, Tatler, Harper's Bazaar.

Works from her collaborations with fashion houses like Dior, Valentino, Chanel and Armani were published in the photo book Haute Couture. The Polaroids of Cathleen Naundorf in 2012.

The 2018 publication of Women of Singular beauty – Chanel Haute Couture by Cathleen Naundorf covered over 15 years of Naundorf's collaboration with the fashion house Chanel.

In 2016 she won the American Photography Award.

In 2018 Fotografiska in Stockholm exhibited under the title Secret times, 100 large size photographs, her camera, private diaries and set design.

Naundorf's photographs are at public and private collections including the Metropolitan Museum of Art, New York, the Victoria and Albert Museum, London and the Musée Rodin, Paris.

== Exhibitions ==
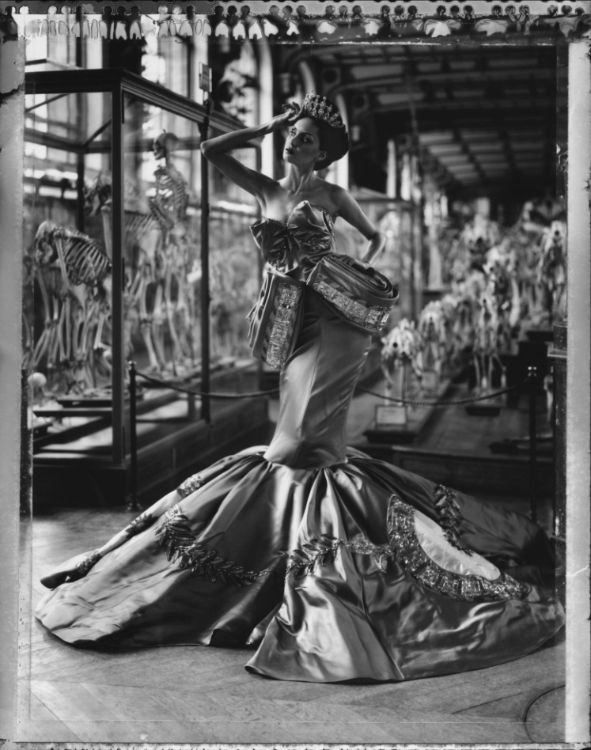
Cathleen Naundorf: The Evolution of Fashion I, (Dior)

Selected solo exhibitions

- Secret times - Cathleen Naundorf. Fotografiska, Stockholm, 2018
- The Crying Game - Cathleen Naundorf. Izzy Gallery, Toronto, 2018
- Cathleen Naundorf. Edwynn Houk Gallery, New York, 2016
- Cathleen Naundorf: Noah’s ark. Hamiltons Gallery, London, 2015
- Cathleen Naundorf. Edwynn Houk Gallery, Zurich, 2015
- Cathleen Naundorf - Haute Couture. Fahey Klein Gallery, Los Angeles, 2014
- The Polaroids of Cathleen Naundorf. Holden Luntz Gallery, Palm Beach, 2014
- Un rêve de mode - Cathleen Naundorf. Hamiltons Gallery, London 2012
- Fotografie Cahtleen Naundorf. Museum Weissenfels, 2011
- Cathleen Naundorf. Art + Fashion. Museum Kleinhues Bau, Kornwestheim, 2010

Selected group exhibitions

- Like a fresco. Yves Klein, Anish Kapoor, Cathleen Naundorf, Ellen von Unwerth. Opera Gallery Beirut, 2020
- Fashion Photography. Peter Lindbergh, Erwin Olaf, Cathleen Naundorf, Paolo Roversi, Albert Watson. Izzy Gallery, Toronto, 2017
- Allure. Richard Avedon, Lillian Bassman, Horst P. Horst, Sarah Moon, Cathleen Naundorf, Helmut Newton, Erwin Olaf, Paolo Roversi. C/O Berlin, 2016
- Fine Art Photography. Richard Avedon, Peter Beard, Cathleen Naundorf, Irving Penn. Izzy Gallery, Toronto, 2015
- Augenblicke der Photographie. Nick Brandt, Horst P. Horst, Annie Leibovitz, Cathleen Naundorf, Helmut Newton, Irvin Penn, Jeanloup Sieff. Neumeister /Bernheimer, München, 2011
- The architecture of fashion – three generations of fashion photography, George Honingen–Huene, Horst P. Horst, Cathleen Naundorf. Holden Luntz Gallery, Palm Beach, 2010
- Gazing at Beauty. George Honingen-Huene, Horst P. Horst, Cathleen Naundorf, Herb Ritts, Melvin Sokolsky. Holden Luntz Gallery, Palm Beach, 2009
- Fashion is big. Patrick Demarchelier, George Honingen-Huene, Frank Horvat, Horst P. Horst, William Klein, Cathleen Naundorf, Herb Ritts, Albert Watson. Holden Luntz Gallery, Palm Beach, 2008
- Mujeres en plural. Bill Brandt, Robert Frank, Cathleen Naundorf, Irving Penn, Man Ray, Fundacion Canal, Madrid, 2008

== Publications ==
- Naundorf, Cathleen; Harder, Matthias (2012). Stehmann, Ira (ed.). Haute Couture. The Polaroids of Cathleen Naundorf. New York, München: Prestel. ISBN 978-3-7913-51551.
- Naundorf, Cathleen; Neutres, Jérôme (2018). Women of Singular Beauty: Chanel Haute Couture by Cathleen Naundorf. New York: Rizzoli. ISBN 978-0-8478-6348-8.
- Naundorf, Cathleen; Neutres, Jérôme (2018). Beauté singulière: Chanel haute couture par Cathleen Naundorf. New York: Rizzoli. ISBN 978-0-8478-6205-4.
