= Care Johnson =

British photographer and fashion designer

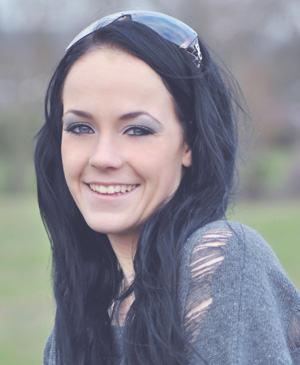
- A self-portrait by Johnson in 2014.
- Born: Care Johnson; 1993 or 1994 (age 32–33)
- Occupations: Portrait photographer, fashion designer

Care Johnson (born 1993 or 1994) is a British photographer and fashion designer. She has previously been selected as ambassador for The Prince's Trust.

== Life and career ==
Johnson left college at 16 and worked as a head show groom, where she used professional cameras. When a childhood allergy forced to abandon this career, she took up photography. In 2012, she was chosen from a number of Princes Trust-supported photographers across the UK by Rankin to work with him on an advertising creative for The Prince's Trust.

Johnson appeared on Glamour magazines 'One to Watch 2014' list. In September 2014 Johnson won 'The Good Samaritan Award' at The Youth 4 Excellence Awards Ceremony held in Birmingham. Johnson was awarded an artisan award for adults clothing and was runner up for the arts award.

Care was elected as a member of the Lib Dems for Oswestry Town Council in May 2025.
