= Myrlande Constant =

Haitian and Vodou artist

- Born: Myrland Constant; 1968 (age 57–58); Port-au-Prince, Haiti
- Occupation: Visual artist
- Known for: Paintings, textile art, flags

Myrlande Constant (born 1968) is a Haitian textile artist who specializes in Vodou themed flags, or drapo Vodou. Since she began making Vodou flags in the 1990s, she has transformed and surpassed this medium, preferring to make large-scale tableau, she describes her work as "painting with beads." Constant is married and the mother of four children.

== Biography ==
Constant was born in Port-au-Prince in Haiti where, as a teenager, she learned the art of beading while working with her mother in a Port-au-Prince factory making wedding dresses. Once she quit that job, she moved on to be one of the most celebrated artists for making Vodou drapo. Constant has taken part in the revolution in the art of drapo-making over the last two decades. She has been making flags since the 1990s. Since the 1990s, there was an abrupt shift in drapo-making, which was primarily a male art form. There are several new designers who are women now, one of them being Myrlande Constant. Because of the impact that Constant has on other people, she influences art-making in other individuals, in particular Marilyn Houlberg.

Constant bears witness to her nation's calamities. For example, after the earthquake in Haiti in 2010, the artwork Myrlande made represented the collectivistic society through the things that were going on at the time.

Her works are densely beaded flags (some as large as six by seven feet). Constant's flags are much larger than traditional flags. In 2011, Constant participated in a series of exhibitions, workshops, and lectures at Brown University in Providence, Rhode Island, where she conducted a three-day flag-making workshop.

== Principal exhibitions and works ==
Myrlande Constant had her first sale to Richard A Morse, who was the manager of the Oloffson Hotel in Port-au-Prince. Other subsequent sales of her outstanding Vodou flags were made through the connections of her husband, Charles, who convinced customers and visitors at the hotel to buy her work. Many of Constant's inspirations for her artwork came from her father, who is a Vodou priest and Christian. She states that she has no one to thank but the spirits and God before the spirits. She additionally states that the mystical feelings and aspirations come from her thoughts. Everything she puts on a flag is there for a reason because the spirit keeps her working. Constant is also inspired by Milo Rigaud's landmark book called Veve. This book contains symbolic drawings of spirits made on Vodou temple floors. Constant uses that inspiration to remember her memories of Vodou ceremonies and knowledge of the spirits to create her own design in the flags.

The main process of the making of her flags starts with pencil drawings on white cloth. Second, she sews the sequins and beads to the cloth. Lastly, she incorporates the colors that associate with the spirits. Typically, most of her works are as large as bedspreads depicting various significant events in Vodou and Haitian history through using needle, thread, cloth, and tiny adornments.

Constant is particularly a well-known Haitian and Vodou artist in many parts of the world. Specifically, her piece of the 2010 Haiti earthquake apocalypse was recognized as an immediate potential for becoming one of the 2011 Ghetto Biennale Exhibition in New York's most extreme and powerful artistic visions. In 2014, her work was exhibited along with André Eugène, Adler Guerrier, Pascale Monnin, and others in a group show co-curated by Herns Louis Marcelin and Kate Ramsey titled "Transformative Visions: Works by Haitian Artists from the Permanent Collection" that was held at the University of Miami Lowe Art Museum. In 2018, she was one of the participating artists in the group show, PÒTOPRENS: The Urban Artists of Port-au-Prince at Pioneer Works, co-curated by Haitian-American artist and curator Edouard Duval-Carrié and British artist and curator Leah Gordon. In 2019, along with twenty-two other artists, her work was exhibited in "The Last Supper" themed Faena Art Festival in Miami. Pushing the boundaries of the form, the largest of her flags measured 10 by 7 feet. In 2022, a retrospective of her work will be held at the Fowler Museum at UCLA. Constant's work Negra Danbala Wedo (1994-2019), is featured in the collection of the Pérez Art Museum Miami.
