= Jane Wigley =

British photographer (1806–1883)

Jane Nina Wigley (1806–1883) was one of the earliest British female commercial photographers, who operated studios in Newcastle and London.

Wiley was born on 4 November 1806. She purchased a licence for 'Newcastle, Gateshead and the surrounding towns' from the patentee Richard Beard to operate the daguerreotype process and opened a studio in the Royal Arcade, Newcastle upon Tyne in September 1845. In June 1847, she moved her business to London where she produced coloured or enamelled daguerreotypes in King's Road, Chelsea (1847–1848) and Fleet Street (1848–1855).

Wigley was apparently a pioneer in the use of a prism in the camera in order to reverse the daguerreotype image.
