= Sofitel Paris Le Faubourg =

- Hotel chain: Sofitel

General information
- Type: Classical
- Location: Paris, France
- Coordinates: 48°52′7.7″N 2°19′17.7″E
- Owner: Mount Kellett Capital
- Landlord: Accor

Design and construction
- Other designers: Didier Gomez

Other information
- Seating capacity: 60
- Number of rooms: 147
- Number of suites: 36
- Number of restaurants: 1
- Number of bars: 1
- Facilities: Restaurant

Website
- Official website

Sofitel Paris Le Faubourg is a 5-star luxury hotel located in the Rue du Faubourg Saint-Honoré, 8th arrondissement of Paris, France, near the Place de la Concorde. Housed in property formerly owned by Accor hotel group (having been founded in 1997), in 2013 it was sold in a leaseback to New York City-based Mount Kellett Capital for €113 million, including €13 million as renovations. It counts with 147 rooms, a restaurant named Stay seating 60, a bar and a "pastry library" run by thrice Michelin star winner Yannick Alléno, two meeting rooms and a fitness center.

Didier Gomez lead the renovations of the 18th century mansion housing the hotel, once the headquarters for Marie Claire.
