= Sarah Anne Bright =

British artist, photographer (1793–1866)

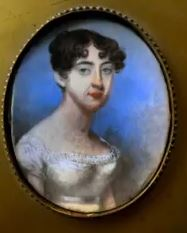
- Sarah Anne Bright
- Born: 1793; Bristol, England
- Died: 26 October 1866 (aged 72–73); Colwall, Herefordshire
- Known for: Photography
- Notable work: Quillan Leaf

Sarah Anne Bright (1793–1866) was a 19th-century English artist and photographer who produced the earliest surviving photographic images taken by a woman. Images she had produced were not attributed to her until 2015 when her initials were discovered on a photogram that was previously consigned to an auction at Sotheby's in New York.

== Biography ==
Bright lived in Bristol, England, one of nine children born to Richard Bright (1754–1840) and Sarah Heywood Bright. Her father was a wealthy merchant and banker, and he is known to have had a strong interest in science. In 1823 he was one of the founders of the Bristol Institution for the Advancement of Science, Literature and the Arts. Little else is known about Sarah Anne Bright's life.

Her role as an early photographer was discovered after a group of photographs known as the Quillan Collection was offered for sale at Sotheby's auction house in New York in 2008. The collection was assembled during 1988–1990 by private photography dealer Jill Quasha.

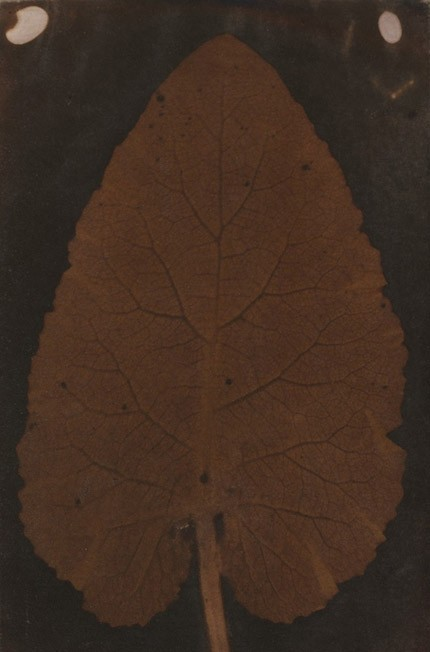
The Quillan Leaf, by Sarah Anne Bright

Initially one of the photographs in the collection, a photogram now known as ‘’The Quillan Leaf’’, was thought to have been produced by William Henry Fox Talbot, but when Fox Talbot expert Larry Schaaf examined it he declared that it definitely was not by Fox Talbot. Due to some speculation about who might have created the image, Sotheby's listed it in the sale catalog under "Photographer Unknown". The catalogue entry included three pages of documentation and notes by Schaaf.

At the time of the auction, the image had a clear provenance as coming from an album that originally belonged to Henry Bright of Ham Green, Bristol, England. The original album included seven photograms and several watercolors and drawings, but only the photograms had survived at the time of the auction.

The print had a clearly marked "W” on the recto, along with other writing that appeared to be the initials "H.B.". After carefully studying the print, Schaaf originally speculated that the "W” might be the initial of Thomas Wedgwood and that the print possibly could have been produced as early as 1805. Based upon the uncertainty surrounding its authorship and age, Sotheby's withdrew the print from the sale pending further research.

Schaaf began to explore the possible connections with Henry Bright and known photographers in the Bristol area. He determined that the "W” on the print was a mark of William West, a man who was known to have made early photographic papers in Bristol in 1839, thereby fixing the date of the print. Further research led him to discover that what has appeared to be the initials "H.B." on the leaf print were actually the letters "S.A.B.", and that the handwriting matched initials on watercolors that were known to be by Sarah Anne Bright. Schaaf concluded that Bright had made the image and announced his findings at a lecture at the University of Lincoln in June 2015.

In the 1851 and 1861 census Sarah Anne Bright was living with her sisters, Phebe and Elizabeth in Colwall, Herefordshire, where she died and is buried.
