= Rebecca Lilith Bathory =

British photographer

Rebecca Bathory
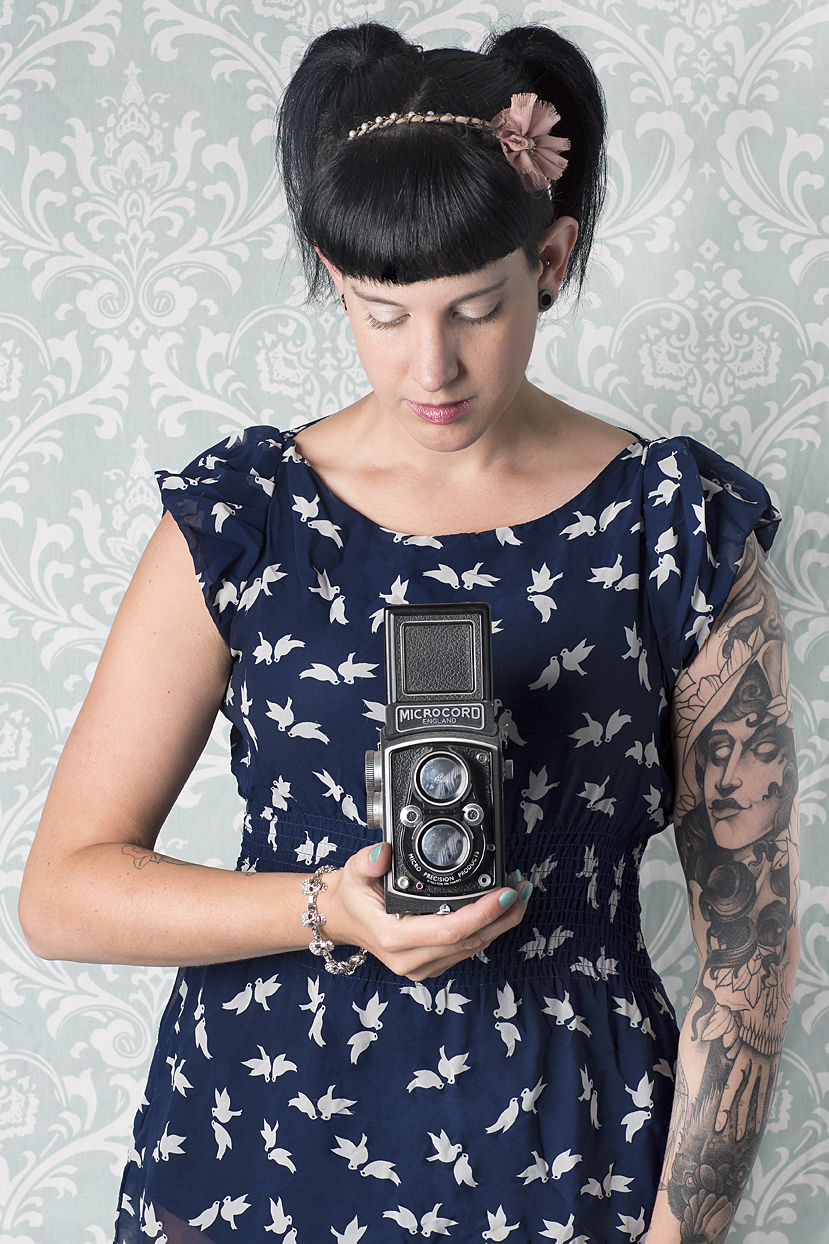
- Born: Rebecca Parkes; Sutton, London, United Kingdom
- Education: University for the Creative Arts London College of Fashion Roehampton University
- Known for: Photography
- Website: rebeccabathory.com

Rebecca Lilith Bathory, previously briefly known as Rebecca Litchfield, is a British photographer living in London. Her photographic series include Soviet Ghosts, Return to Fukushima, Dark Tourism, and Orphans of Time.

== Early life and education ==
Bathory was born in Sutton, London. She graduated from University for the Creative Arts with a first class degree in Graphic Design in June 2006. Between 2008 and 2010, she studied for a master's degree in Fashion Photography at The London College of Fashion, for which she was awarded a distinction. She exhibited her final masters project, Edenias, at Mall Gallery in London.

In 2014, she was awarded a Techne scholarship for a research PhD degree at the University of Roehampton to research the photography of dark tourism photography. She gained a PhD in Social Anthropology July 2022.

== Photography ==
As Rebecca Litchfield, she recorded many abandoned locations within 10 countries of the former Soviet Union, including towns, factories, prisons, schools, monuments, hospitals, theatres, military complexes, asylums and death camps. Her book Soviet Ghosts examines a society shrouded by the Cold War.

Bathory's second book explores the nuclear meltdown in Fukushima. 2016 was the first time that residents of the town of Tomioka were given permission to return to their homes; Bathory was also given permission to photograph in the thirty-mile exclusion zone. Bathory produced never-before-seen images of the ghost town of Fukushima, providing a meditation on human failure and pondering what might be next for a nuclear future.

In 2016 Bathory photographed her third book Dark Tourism, travelling around the world to 20 countries to visit 100 "dark tourist" sites in the UK, Germany, Austria, Czech Republic, Switzerland, France, Italy, Mexico, Vietnam, Cambodia, Thailand, Philippines, Japan, Poland, Slovakia, India, USA, Indonesia, Ukraine and Cuba. The phrase dark tourism conjures up images and ideas of destinations associated with death, suffering, tragedy and the macabre. Dark tourism is a very visual practice, like tourism in general. It involves seeing potentially tragic sites with one's own eyes, and in most cases, photographing it to prolong the moment.

Bathory's fourth book Orphans of Time was self-published, and contains 200 colour photos of abandoned buildings. Since 2012 she travelled around the world for five years, seeking out beautiful locations featuring decay.

== Publications ==
- Litchfield, Rebecca (2014). Soviet Ghosts The Soviet Union Abandoned: a Communist Empire in Decay. Carpet Bombing Culture. ISBN 9781908211163.
- Bathory, Rebecca (2017). Return to Fukushima. Pro-Actif Communications. ISBN 9781908211484.
- Bathory, Rebecca (2017). Dark Tourism. Carpet Bombing Culture. ISBN 9781908211514.
- Bathory, Rebecca (2017). Orphans of Time. Self-published. ISBN 9781527210394.

== Awards ==
- 2009: Professional Photographer of the Year 2009 Overall Winner, Professional Photographer magazine
- 2009: Fashion category winner, Professional Photographer of The Year 2009, Professional Photographer magazine
- 2014: Clapham Art Prize Winner, Clapham Art Prize award

== Exhibitions ==
- 2016: Salon Del Mobile Milan Presentation, Salon Del Mobile, Milan. For Moooi.
