= Andrea Jones =

Scottish garden photographer

- Occupation: Garden photographer
- Website: www.andreajones.co.uk

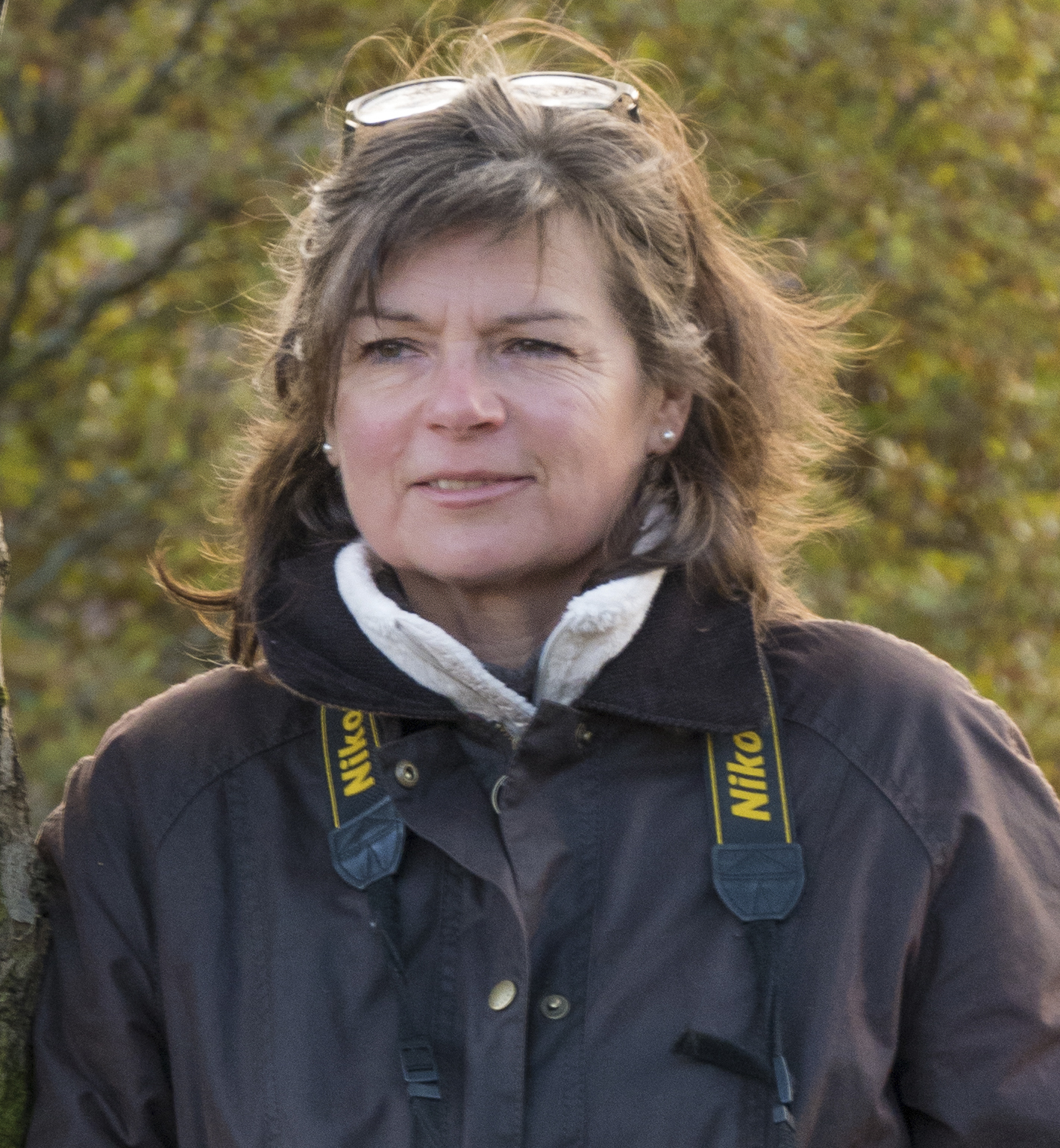
Portrait of Andrea Jones by Jonathan Buckley - © Jonathan Buckley 2025, All Rights Reserved.

Andrea Jones is a garden, plant and landscape photographer. She photographs internationally for magazines, newspapers and book publishers, and on commission for landscape architects, garden designers and private clients.

Based in Scotland, she runs two photographic libraries Garden Exposures Photo Library and Plantation Totally Tree Photo Library.

== Work ==
Jones has built up a reputation for her photographs of landscape architecture, garden design and plants, with the latter being the subject of her solo book Plantworlds (2005), published by Damiani. She also fully illustrated Great Gardens of America (2009) written by Tim Richardson and published by Frances Lincoln. Her further solo books include the best selling The Garden Source (2018) published by 8books and the Garden Photography Workshop published by Timber Press, 2017.

Further books include; The Splendour of the Tree written by Noel Kingsbury, 2014, published by Frances Lincoln, At West Dean; The Creation of an Exemplary Garden, Quarto 2019, Essential Pruning Techniques written by Tony Kirkham, Timber Press, 2017.

== Honours ==
Jones is a Fellow of the RSA.

Ambassador for The Roberto Burle Marx Foundation.

Jury panel member for the Chaumont sur Loire International Garden Festival, France, 2023, 2024 and 2025.

Jury panel member for the UK Society of Garden Designers annual awards, 2021 & 2022.

2025 RHS Botanical Art and Photography Show, Saatchi Gallery, London:

Prizewinner - Silver-Gilt Medal, Portfolio Photography

2024 RHS Botanical Art and Photography Show, Saatchi Gallery, London:

Winner - Best Portfolio

Winner - Gold Medal

2023 Association of Photographers Photography Awards:

Finalist - AoP 'Spaces' category

2022 The RHS Photographic Competition:

Winner - Gardens Category

UK annual Garden Media Guild Awards:

Finalist - The Gordon Rae Photographer of the Year 2024

Finalist - The Gordon Rae Photographer of the Year 2021

Finalist - The Gordon Rae Photographer of the Year 2019

Finalist - Book of the Year - 'At West Dean: The Creation of an Exemplary Garden' 2019

Winner - The Gordon Rae Photographer of the Year 2018

Winner - Book Photographer of the Year 2014

Finalist - Features Photographer of the Year 2014

Finalist - Features Photographer of the Year 2013

Finalist - Book Photographer of the Year 2012

Winner - Garden Photographer of the Year 2009

Finalist - Book Photographer of the Year 2009

Winner - Garden Photographer of the Year 2008

== Exhibitions ==
- The RHS Botanical Art & Photography Competition, Saatchi Gallery, London - 14 June to 28 July 2024
- 'The Golden Hour' - Celebrating 20 years of photographing gardens around the world. A solo exhibition at The Mill on the Fleet, Dumfries & Galloway, Scotland - June 2013
- RSA (London) solo exhibition of photography on permanent display - 1997 to 2005
- Chanticleer, Pennsylvania, USA – Garden Exposures – exhibition of photographs taken at Chanticleer gardens with the sculptures of Alasdair Currie - July to September 2004
- London Wetland Centre – Solo exhibition of photography alongside the work of Sculptor Alasdair Currie - May 2003
- Plantworks – exhibition of photography with fellow photographer Jonathan Buckley – April 2003
- The Hulton Getty Gallery, London – Take Four. Exhibition of work along with two other photographers Nick Danziger and Ben Elwes - August 2001
- The Old Course Hotel, St Andrews, Scotland – Art on the Links – solo exhibition – Spring 2000
- The Museum of Garden History, Lambeth Palace, London – Gardens with Soul - solo exhibition - October 1999
