= Kirsty Mitchell (artist) =

British fine art photographer

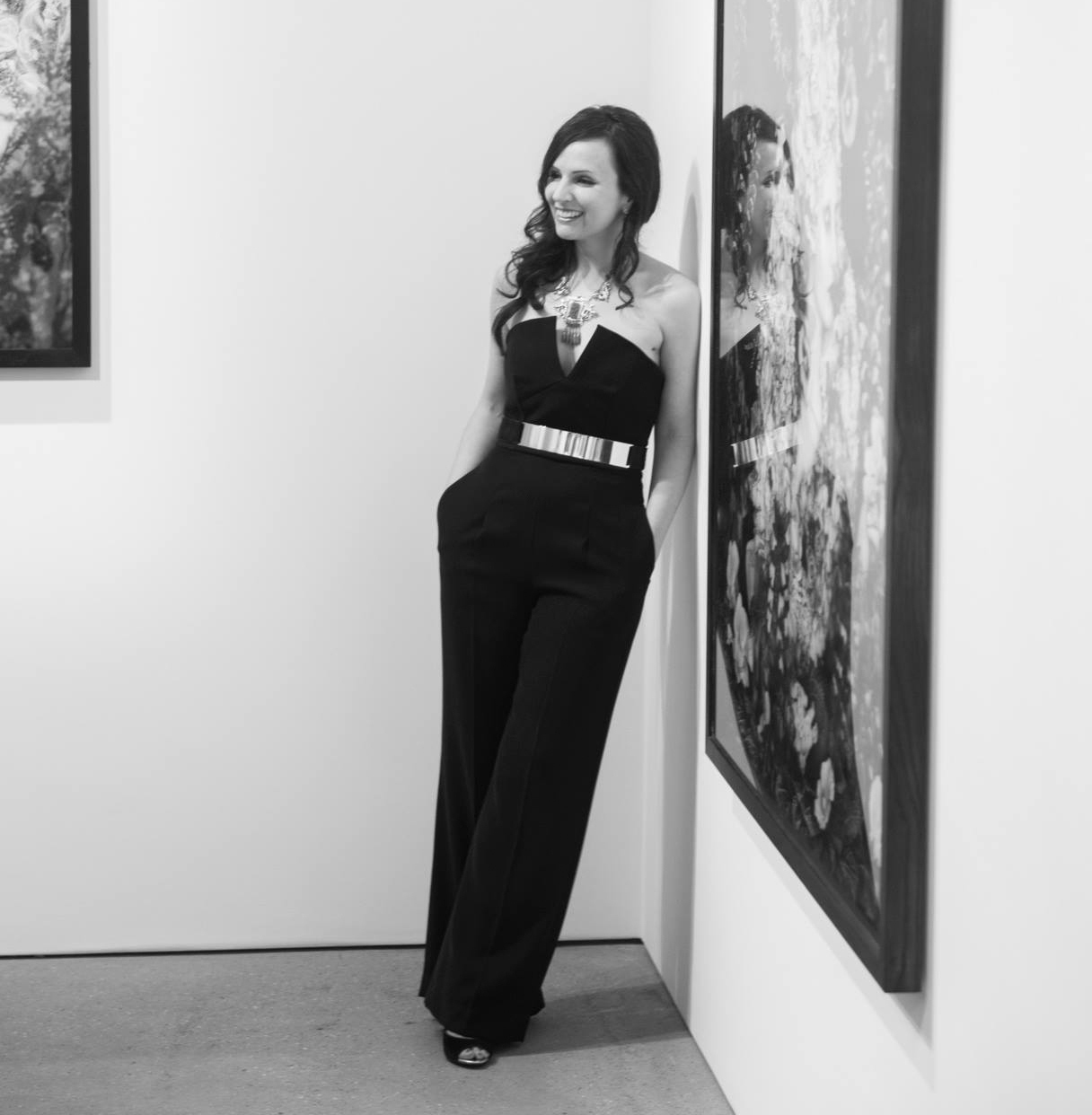
- Kirsty exhibiting in Mayfair, London
- Occupation: Artist
- Known for: Fine art photography
- Notable work: The Wonderland Series
- Website: kirstymitchell.art

Kirsty Linsel Mitchell (born 7 May 1976) is a British fine art photographer who creates theatrical staged scenes as the subject of her works. She draws upon her past experience in fashion and costume design to hand craft the costumes, props and sets. She is known for her series Wonderland and is the author of its accompanying book.

== Early life and education ==
Mitchell began her higher education at the age of 16 studying History of Art, Fine Art, and Photography. At 19 she specialised in 'Costume for Performance'; at the London College of Fashion, gaining a Higher National Diploma with Distinction. She continued her studies for a further three years at Ravensbourne College of Art, graduating in 2001 with a First Class Bachelor of Arts Degree with Honours in Fashion Design and Textiles.

Between the years 1999 and 2001, Mitchell interned in London at the studios of British Avant Garde Designers Alexander McQueen and Hussein Chalayan. For the next decade Mitchell worked as a fashion designer specialising in surface decoration and fabric manipulation, spending time in India and China, learning the crafts of beading and embroidery.

In 2008, her mother Maureen Mitchell was diagnosed with a brain tumour. It was during this time, at the age of 32, that Mitchell recalls “the situation was such a trauma… my only way of dealing with it was through the camera”. Her mother’s death in November 2008 became the turning point in Mitchell’s life, leading her to become a full-time artist and producing her series 'Wonderland'.

== Work ==
=== Wonderland ===
Wonderland is a collection of 74 photographs by Mitchell, created in memory of her mother Maureen Mitchell, who was an English teacher with a passion for storytelling. Mitchell describes the photographs as meditations on the stories and illustrations from the fairy tales her mother read to her as a child, mixed with her adult grief and spiritual connection with nature. The series took five years to produce and was completed at the end of 2014.

Throughout the development of the series Mitchell published a personal journal (the ‘Wonderland Diaries’) which documents the lengthy process behind her creation of each photograph, the costumes and props, as well as her emotional reactions to her bereavement.

=== The Wonderland Book ===
The Wonderland Book includes all 74 artworks from the Wonderland collection. It also presents Mitchell’s journal which features the documentary images of the shoots, costumes and props.

Driven by the need to create a book beautiful enough to commemorate her late mother, Mitchell collaborated with the British designer Stuart Smith, and launched a crowdfunding campaign on Kickstarter on 9 September 2015.

The campaign raised over £334k in 28 days and became the highest grossing photobook ever on Kickstarter, a record it still holds. The 1st and 2nd editions of the book have since sold out and it is now in its 3rd edition, which received the 'Silver' award at the Budapest International Foto Awards in 2022.

=== Quiescence ===
In 2019 Mitchell began shooting her new series Quiescence which is based on events in her life between 2015 and 2017, during which time she became pregnant with her only child Finch, and eight months later was diagnosed with breast cancer.

Mitchell draws a parallel with her process for Wonderland, by once again translating painful real life experiences into a narrative. However, she describes the production level as a far greater undertaking than her earlier work, with fine art films being made of each scene, and some of the sets taking a full year to make.

She remains in remission and lives and works in the English countryside with her husband Matthew and their young son.

== Awards and accolades ==
- Budapest International Foto Awards – 2022 – Silver Award in Book / Fine Art category for ‘The Wonderland Book’.
- Budapest International Foto Awards – 2022 - Bronze Award in Fine Art / Other category for the ‘Wonderland’ series.
- ND Photography Awards – 2022 - 3rd Place/ Bronze Star Award in Professional Fine Art: Conceptual category for ‘Wonderland’ series.
- ND Photography Awards – 2022 - Honourable Mention in Professional Portraiture category for ‘Minna’ portrait.
- International Photography Awards – 2016 - Honourable Mention in Fine Art Book Category for ‘The Wonderland Book’.
- Kickstarter – 2015 to present – ‘Most Funded’ Photobook / Photography book for ‘The Wonderland Book’.
- Lens Culture Visual Storytelling Awards – 2014 - Grand Prize Winner in Fictional Narratives category.
- London International Creative Competition -2014 - Finalist in Professional Photography category for ‘The Secret Locked In The Roots Of A Kingdom’ (from the ‘Wonderland’ series).
- Nikon UK ‘Ambassador for Fine Art’, 2013 – 2016. Nikon’s first ever Ambassador for Fine Art, and also Nikon’s first female ambassador.
- Framed Awards (US) – Best Conceptual Photographer – 2012. Winner.

== Exhibitions ==
- The National: Best Contemporary Photography 2015, The Fort Wayne Museum of Art, USA, October 2015 – January 2016.
- Fairy Tale Fashion, The Museum, FIT, New York, January–April 2016. Select artworks from the Wonderland series.
- Wonderland: Photographs by Kirsty Mitchell, The Paine Art Museum, Wisconsin, June – October 2017.
- Wonderland: Photographs by Kirsty Mitchell, The Fort Wayne Museum of Art, USA, June – September 2018.
- Kirsty Mitchell: Wonderland, Fotografiska Museum, Stockholm, Sweden, December 2018 – March 2019.
- Kirsty Mitchell: Wonderland, Fotografiska Museum, Tallinn, Estonia, September–November 2019.
- Wonderland: Photographs by Kirsty Mitchell, Museum of Art – DeLand, Florida, US, January–May 2020.
- 15 Fotografiska Years (group show). Fotografiska Museum, Stockholm, Sweden, October 2025 - February 2026.
- Kirsty Mitchell - Wonderland. Falsterbo Photo Art Museum, Sweden. March 2025 - March 2026.
- The Spellbound Spirit: Photographs by Kirsty Mitchell. The Fort Wayne Museum of Art, USA, January - April, 2026.

== Publications ==
- Wonderland. By Kirsty Mitchell. 2015. ISBN 978-0-9934464-0-5
- Fairy Tale Fashion. By Colleen Hill. 2016. ISBN 978-0-300-21802-2
- The Fairie Handbook. By Carolyn Turgeon. 2017. ISBN 978-0-06-266811-0
