= Emma Hardy (photographer) =

British portrait photographer

Emma Hardy is a British photographer, living in London. Her first book, Permissions (2022), is a document of motherhood and childhood. Hardy's work is held in the collections of the National Portrait Gallery, London and National Galleries of Scotland.

== Life and work ==
Hardy was born in London and studied drama and French at Bristol University before living in Paris. She returned to London and worked as an actor. Later she moved to rural Suffolk and concentrated on photography.

It was in Suffolk, over the course of 20 years, that she made the photographs of her mother and children that appear in her first book, Permissions (2022). "The photographs in the book show moments of recognisable domesticity interspersed with more idyllic scenes", "blending the candid with the composed". "The book is divided into chapters, each announced by a large-format still life of home-grown flowers".

As of 2023 she lives in London.

== Publications ==
- Permissions. London: Gost, 2022. With an essay by Alice Zoo. ISBN 978-1-910401-78-1.

== Collections ==
Hardy's work is held in the following permanent collections:

- National Galleries of Scotland: 1 print (as of 18 March 2023)
- National Portrait Gallery, London: 39 prints (as of 18 March 2023)
