= Araminta de Clermont =

British photographer

- Born: 1971 (age 54–55); Isle of Man
- Known for: Photography
- Awards: Career Development Award at Spier Contemporary 2010
- Website: aramintadeclermont.com

Araminta de Clermont (born 1971) is a British photographer who in 2010 was living and working in London, although she had spent nearly ten years living in Cape Town. Her work explores rites of passage, and the visual currencies of group identification and is particularly concerned with highlighting the art forms and self-expression of her often marginalised subjects. She is perhaps best known for her bodies of work exploring the relationship between person and environment in South Africa. In 2010 she was a winner of Spier Contemporary.

== Early life ==
de Clermont's childhood was split between London and the Isle of Man, where her grandfather Charles Birkin, the renowned writer of gothic horror stories, lived. She briefly modelled in London in her late teens, including for publications such as iD Magazine, a magazine pioneering The Straight Up, a documentary portraiture style her own work can be seen to echo.

== Education ==
de Clermont studied Architecture at The Bartlett University College London, gaining a BSc, before turning to photography, which she studied first at Central St Martins School of Art, and later at Ruth Prowse School of Art, following a move to Cape Town. In 2008 she was selected to take part in a master class led by Stephen Shore.

== Career ==
de Clermont worked initially as a staff photographer at The Sunday Times, under picture editor Greg Marinovich. "A complete education in itself, both in photography and in the realities of a nation attempting to recover". She later turned freelance in order to concentrate on her own work, although she continued to contribute to the paper, and to various English publications including The Guardian, The Times and The Sunday Times. Ms. de Clermont has also worked as an art therapist.

== Works ==
Her main series have a universal theme of metamorphosis, with all those photographed having undergone physical transformations mirroring deep inner changes that they have either gone through, are going through, or hope to go through, whether for a night, several months, or for a period of years.

=== "Life After", 2008 ===
Life After is an exploration into the tattoos and lives of members of the South African prison gangs The Numbers Gang upon their release back into society after many years, if not decades, in prison. de Clermont was Initially interested in documenting the marks for their own sakes, and exploring the motives behind such extensive tattooing: whether it was about a need to belong, or whether it simply reflected an absolute immersion in “The Number”, whether the tattoos created an armour, or whether they instead offered a voice, a potent form of self-expression, where the prisoners’ skin was perhaps their only remaining possession and form of self-expression. However she became increasingly interested in the men themselves, the journeys they had been on, and perhaps the most pertinent question of all: how they lived with such “branding” after their prison sentence ended.

=== "Before Life", 2009 ===
Before Life looks at girls from The Cape Flats, (a vast area outlying Cape Town), dressed up for their Matric Dance (South Africa's equivalent of The Prom).

=== "A New Beginning", 2010 ===
A New Beginning focuses on recently initiated young Xhosa and Sotho men living in the townships and shacklands surrounding Cape Town. For the majority of these young men, the circumcision ritual is a watershed, is regarded as an opportunity to start a new way of adulthood. For up to 6 months after his time in the bush, a newly initiated man will wear clothing indicating his status as a new man, showing that he has left childhood behind, has gone through the circumcision process (with all the accompanying challenges) and has entered a new phase of life, maturity, and responsibility. Subscribing to certain rigorous guidelines, such attire is recognisable within a particular culture. "New" Xhosa men, or Amakrwala, will wear blazers, buttoned up shirts, smart trousers, polished shoes and hats. "New" Sotho men, or Makolwane, will wear traditional blankets, hats, and beads. This outward demonstration of an inner change is a hugely significant part of the process, and a great source of pride. Unknown people will engage with the "new man" on a completely different level than if he were dressed in his normal clothes. As these suits demand immediate respect, so too do the men wearing them. de Clermont photographed the men wherever she found them, raising questions about the hope and the concept of a new start, when seen in the context of the individual's surroundings and the infrastructure provided by the government.

== Galleries representing ==
- Joao Ferreira (South Africa)
- Skylight Projects (New York)
- Michael Hoppen Contemporary (London)

== Collections ==
- South African National Gallery, Cape Town
- Joao Ferreira Gallery, Cape Town
- Djangoly Gallery, Nottingham, UK
- Trustman Gallery, Boston, USA
- Unisa, South Africa
- Ellerman Contemporary, South Africa

== Selected bibliography ==
- "THE BIG ISSUE, South Africa", collectors edition 2012/2013
- "AFRICAN TEXTILES TODAY" by Chris Spring, British Museum Press, 2012
- "STREET KNOWLEDGE"(an encyclopaedia of street culture), by King Adz, Collins, 2010
- "STREETBALL", a documentary film on The South African Homeless World Cup Football Team, 2010
- "SHANTY TOWN PRINCESSES", Marie Claire, US, April 2010
- "TALES OF HARDSHIP AND HOPE", an interview with Araminta de Clermont, by Janine Stephen, Business Day_Art, March 2009
- "FIGURES AND FICTIONS" by Tamar Garb, in collaboration with V&A Museum
- "BODY OF KNOWLEDGE", SNAPPED, African photography Magazine, Issue 3, Dec 2008, published by Bell-Roberts
- "PRISON INK", The Guardian Newspaper, UK, 5 September 2008

== Group exhibitions (selected) ==
2012

- "CRUEL AND UNUSUAL", Noorderlicht, The Netherlands
- "CRUEL AND UNUSUAL", Photoville, New York

2011

- "TAYLOR WESSING PORTRAIT PRIZE", National Portrait Gallery, London
- "ARAMINTA DE CLERMONT AND ERIC BALDAUF: AFRICA IN PERSON”, Riverside Studios, London
- “LENS: (fractions of contemporary photography in South Africa)” (University of Stellenbosch Art Museum)
- “SIMMONS COLLECTS: CELEBRATING WOMEN ARTISTS”, Simmons College, Boston, USA

2010

- “BONANI FESTIVAL 2010”, Cape Town
- “SKIN”, Wellcome Collection, London
- “DANIELE TAMAGNI and ARAMINTA DE CLERMONT”, Michael Hoppen Contemporary, London
- “STRENGTHS & CONVICTIONS”, Nobel Peace Centre, Oslo, Norway
- “A LIFE LESS ORDINARY”, Ffoto Gallery, Cardiff, Wales, UK
- “SPIER CONTEMPORARY 2010”, South Africa
- “JOBURG ART FAIR”, Sandton Convention Centre, Johannesburg, South Africa

2009

- “STRENGTHS & CONVICTIONS”, South African National Gallery
- “A LIFE LESS ORDINARY”, Djangoly Gallery, Nottingham, UK
- “ON TOP OF THE WORLD”, GreenPoint Stadium visitors centre, Cape Town
- “JOBURG ART FAIR”, Sandton Convention Centre, Johannesburg
- “ART OF THE HUMAN CANVAS”, Cape Town International Convention Centre

2008:

- “HUMAN ANIMAL”, Trustman Gallery, Boston, USA
- “JOBURG ART FAIR”, Sandton Convention Centre, Johannesburg

== Solo exhibitions ==
2012

- “TRANSFORMATIONS”, as part of MOP, Casa Labia, Cape Town

2010

- “A NEW BEGINNING”, Joao Ferreira Gallery, Cape Town
- “BEFORE LIFE”, Michael Hoppen Contemporary, London, UK

2009

- “BEFORE LIFE”, Joao Ferreira Gallery, Cape Town

2008

- “LIFE AFTER”, artSPACE, Berlin, Germany
- “LIFE AFTER”, Joao Ferreira Gallery, Cape Town
