= Ghetto Biennale =

Contemporary Arts Exhibition in Haiti

The Ghetto Biennale (Haitian Creole: Geto Byenal) is an international contemporary arts exhibition held every two years in Port-au-Prince, Haiti during November and December.

== History ==
The Ghetto Biennale was founded and is curated by Andre Eugène, an artist and a member of the local group of sculptors known as the Atis Rezistans, and Leah Gordon, artist and curator. The idea for the event started when Eugéne and other artists were unable to obtain US Visas for an exhibition in Florida, to which they had been invited to exhibit in.

"In Port-au-Prince, Haiti, however, the Ghetto Biennial takes a cold, hard look at what it means to be unseen and excluded from the highly networked, globalized, financially fluid mainstream art circuit. Founded in 2009 by André Eugène and Leah Gordon along with members of the collective Atis Rezistans, the event was created to address the fact that artists living and working in Haiti are often not able to travel—even if their work is included in a major exhibition abroad—often from lack of resources or flat-out visa refusal due to severe restrictions on Haitian passports." – The Observer

Two of the city's poorest districts known as Lakou Cheri and Ghetto Leanne adjacent to the Grand Rue in central Port-au-Prince act as primary sites for the Ghetto Biennale. The biennale offers an opportunity for local artists – often without any training – to work side by side and collaborate with visiting international artists. The Ghetto Biennale has provided an alternative model to the larger and more predictably 'all star' biennales that have become common in over 250 cities around the world since the 90's.

== Editions ==
- 2009, 1st Ghetto Biennale
- 2011, 2nd Ghetto Biennale
- 2013, 3rd Ghetto Biennale: Decentering The Market And Other Tales Of Progress
- 2015, 4th Ghetto Biennale: KREYÒL, VODOU and the LAKOU : Forms of Resistance
- 2017, 5th Ghetto Biennale: A Cartography of Port-au-Prince
- 2019, 6th Ghetto: The Haitian Revolution and Beyond

== Bibliography ==
- Gordon, Leah. Ghetto Biennale = Geto Byenal : 2009-2015. London: No Eraser, 2017. ISBN 9781999864705
