= Emma Barton (photographer) =

English photographer (1872–1938)

- Born: Emma Boaz Rayson; 1872; Birmingham, United Kingdom
- Died: 1938 (aged 65–66); Isle of Wight, United Kingdom
- Known for: Photography
- Spouse: George Barton
- Awards: Royal Photographic Society Medal (1903)

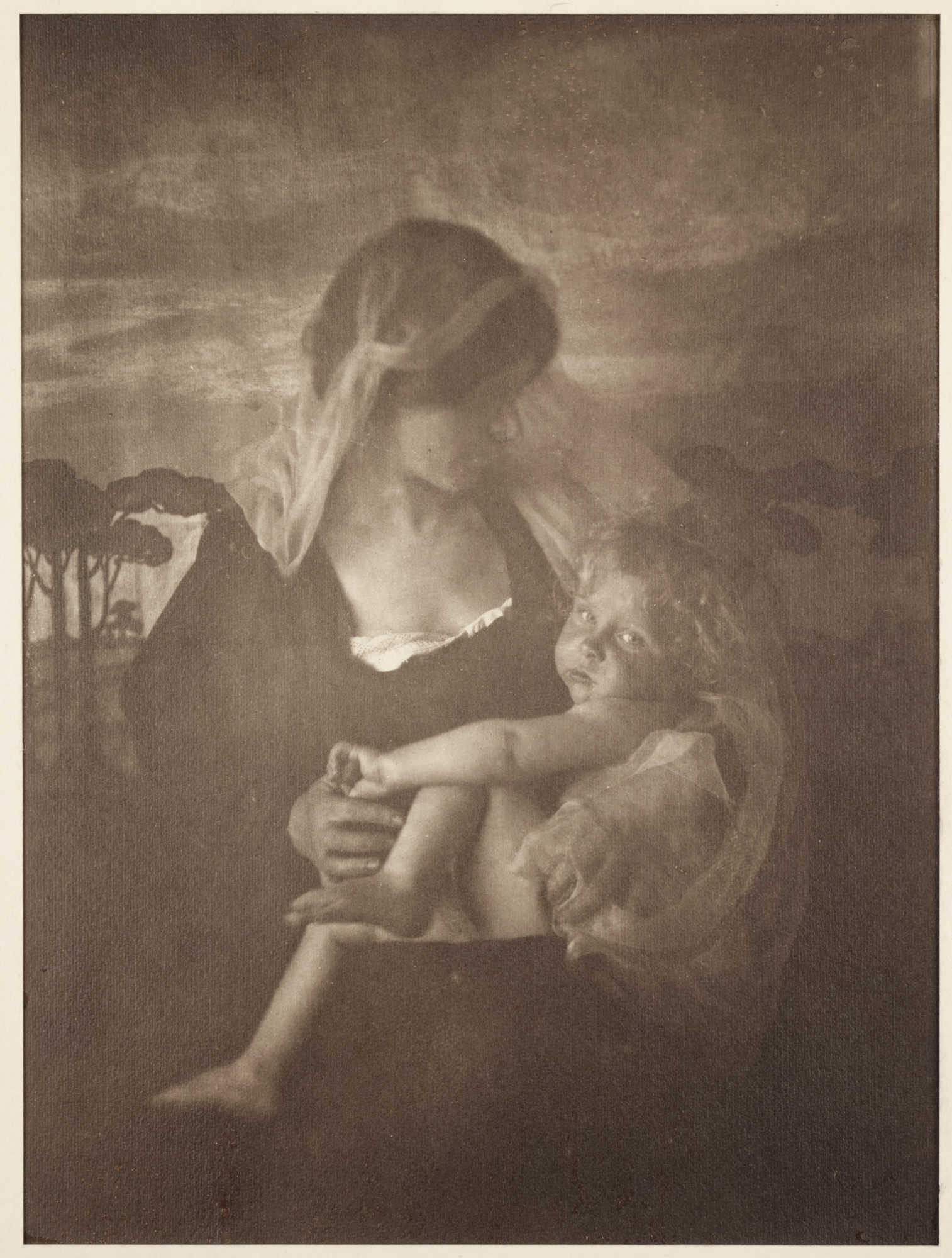
The Awakening, a 1903 carbon print

Emma Barton (1872–1938) was an English portrait photographer.

Born Emma Boaz Rayson into a working-class family in Birmingham, she became the common-law wife of a solicitor, George Barton, with whom she had a son, Cecil Raleigh Barton. She was first introduced to photography by the brother-in-law of her stepfather, and first became known by publishing portraits of Dan Leno, the music hall star and relative of her husband, in 1898. She is one of the few women photographers highly respected for her work during this time period.

In 1901 she had her work shown at the Royal Photographic Society for the first time. She then began to exhibit portraits and religious subjects, being awarded the Royal Photographic Society Medal in 1903 for The Awakening. In 1904 she had her first solo show at the Royal Photographic Society. The following year, she was awarded a $100 prize at the Second American Salon. Not only was her work highly regarded in England, but also internationally. Many of her photographic exhibitions were held in France, America, England, and Berlin. In Berlin, she held a solo exhibition organized by the Photo Club. In 1906 she exhibited 58 prints at the Birmingham Photographic Society’s Exhibition. From there, she presented work at the Third American Salon, the Salon of the Photo Club of Paris, and the Universal Exhibition of Photography in Berlin. By 1908, her work was published in The Sketch, The Sphere, Country Life, and Illustrated London News. When at the height of her career, Barton was possibly the most published female photographer of her time. In 1911 one critic, Charles E. Dawson, wrote in the Penrose Pictorial Annual and ranked her work alongside "the best works of Kasbier, Duhroop, Baron de Mayer, Steichen, Demachy, Puyo, and the other photographic giants..." Peter James of the Birmingham Central Library put on one exhibition featuring Emma Barton’s work. The exhibition featured and honored the work of women born and raised in Birmingham, U.K. Over the years, Emma Barton received several awards for her work.

In the new century her photography was influenced by Old Master paintings, the Arts and Crafts movement and the Pre-Raphaelites, and she was also an early user of the Autochrome Lumière process for color photography.

After 1918 she ceased to exhibit and photographed only her family. She retired to the Isle of Wight in 1932.

Emma Barton's work was later published in the book, Sunlight and Shadow: The Photographs of Emma Barton 1872-1938.

Two of her photographs are included in the National Portrait Gallery, London.
