= Leah Gordon =

British photographer, artist, curator, writer and filmmaker

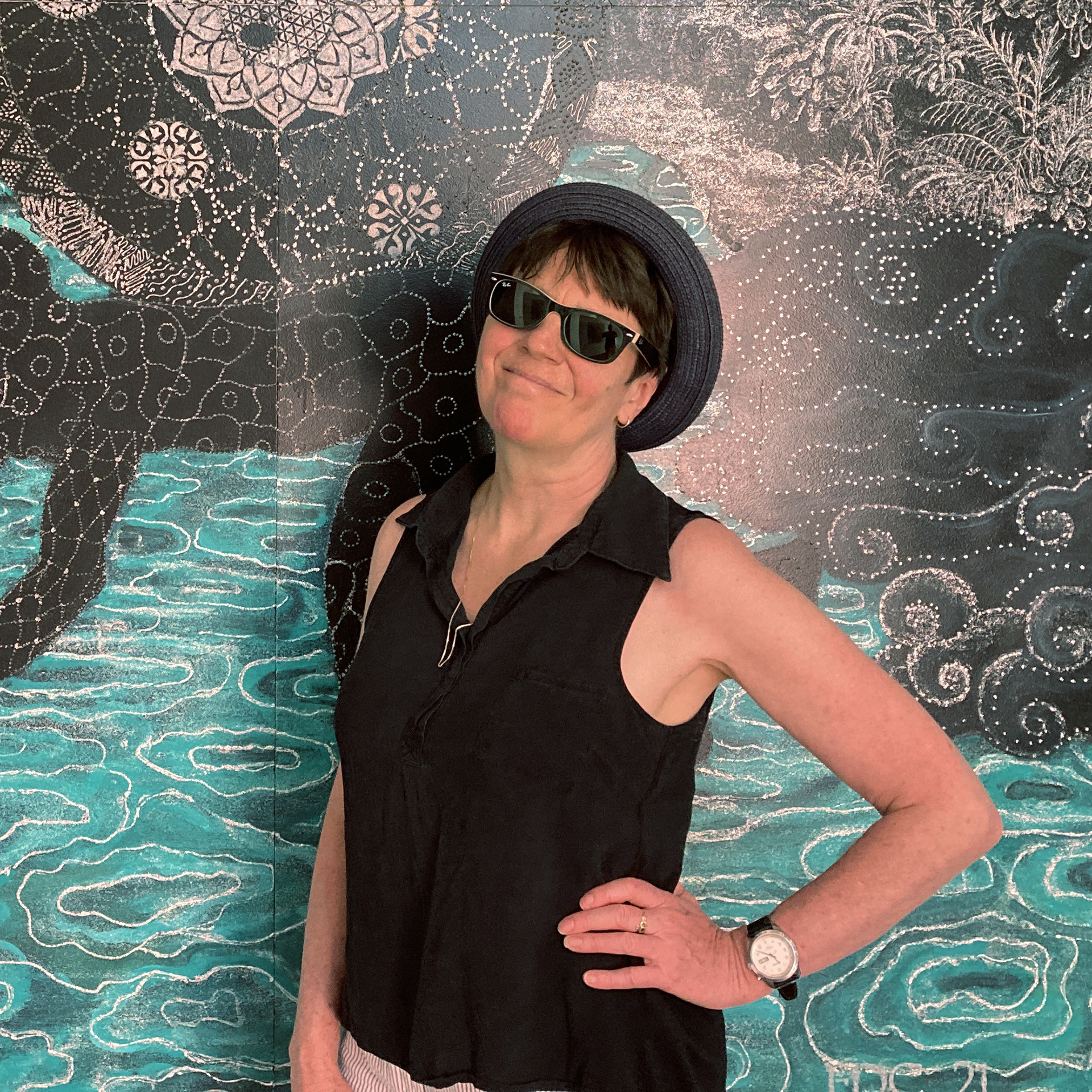
Gordon in 2021

Leah Gordon (born 1959) is a British photographer, artist, curator, writer and filmmaker. Her work explores the intervolved and intersectional histories of the Caribbean plantation system, the Trans-Atlantic Slave Trade, the Enclosure Acts and the creation of the British working-class. She has made various work in Haiti, such as the photographs of Kanaval, which was published in 2021 by Here Press and exhibited at the New Art Exchange, Nottingham in 2012; and the documentary film Kanaval: A People's History of Haiti in Six Chapters (2022, with Eddie Hutton-Mills).

== Work ==
Gordon has made various photographic work in Haiti, such as about Haitian Carnival (Kanaval); Freemasons; the three-tiered racial classification system created by the 18th-century French colonialist Médéric Louis Élie Moreau de Saint-Méry; and the tailors of Port-au-Prince. She has also made photographic work about airport prayer spaces.

She is a co-founder of Ghetto Biennale, a biannual international contemporary arts exhibition in Port-au-Prince, Haiti.

== Publications ==
- Kanaval: Vodou, Politics and Revolution on the Streets of Haiti. London: Soul Jazz, 2010. Photography by Gordon. ISBN 978-0955481734. With essays by Madison Smartt Bell ("Spirit sources of the Haitian Revolution"), Donald Cosentino ("Aristocrats"), Richard Fleming ("Kanaval"), Kathy Smith ("Lansetkòd: memory, mimicry, masculinity") and Myron M. Beasley ("The performance of possibilities").
  - Revised and expanded second edition. London: Here, 2021. ISBN 978-1999349479. Includes new photographs and oral histories. With essays by Gordon ("Transgressive Histories and Disorderly Ancestors"), Madison Smartt Bell, Kathy Smith, and Myron M. Beasley.
- Ghetto Biennale = Geto Byenal: 2009–2015. London: No Eraser, 2017. Compiled by Gordon. ISBN 9781999864705. Illustrated catalogue documenting the first four Ghetto Biennale events. With written contributions by Emilie Boone, Léonard Jean Baptiste, Makenson Bijou, Claudel Casseus, Rossi Jacques Casimir, John Cussans, Jean D'Amérique, Peter Haffner, Charlotte Hammond, John Kieffer, Jean-Daniel Lafontant, Elizabeth McAlister, Polly Savage and Katherine Smith.

== Exhibitions ==
=== Solo exhibitions ===
- Kanaval: Vodou, Politics and Revolution on the Streets of Haiti, New Art Exchange, Nottingham, 2012
- The Invisibles, Riflemaker Gallery, London

=== Exhibitions curated by Gordon ===
- Pòtoprens: The Urban Artists of Port-au-Prince, curated by Gordon and Edouard Duval-Carrié. Includes work by 25 Haitian artists. Pioneer Works, Brooklyn, New York, 2018. With work by Katelyne Alexis, Josué Azor, Karim Bléus, Myrlande Constant, Ronald Edmond, André Eugène, Guyodo (Frantz Jacques), Celeur Jean Hérard, Michel Lafleur, Dubréus Lhérisson, Ti Pelin (Jean Salomon Horace), Evel Romain, Jean Claude Saintilus, Maggie Steber, Roberto Stephenson, and Yves Telemaque.

== Films ==
- A Pig's Tale – documentary; commissioned for Channel 4; 52 mins
- Atis Rezistans: The Sculptors of Grand Rue – 32 mins
- Bounda pa Bounda: A Drag Zaka – documentary; 20 mins

All three films are compiled on the Iron in the Soul: The Haiti Documentary Films of Leah Gordon DVD from Soul Jazz Records.

- Kanaval: A People's History of Haiti in Six Chapters (2022) – documentary; co-directed with Eddie Hutton-Mills; 74 mins

== See also ==
- Charles Fréger
- Phyllis Galembo
- Homer Sykes
