= Amelia Troubridge =

British photographer (born 1974)

- Born: 1974 (age 51–52); London, England
- Education: Middlesex University; New York State University
- Occupations: Portrait photographer, commercial and documentary photographer
- Awards: Ian Parry award
- Website: ameliatroubridge.com

Amelia Troubridge (born 1974) is a British photographer.

== Biography ==
Troubridge read American studies at Middlesex University and State University of New York at New Paltz discovering the work of Dorothea Lange and the New Deal photographers. In 1996 she won the Ian Parry award for her first social documentary story, Dublin's Urban Cowboys.

In 1998 Troubridge won a place on the Joop Swart Masterclass organized by World Press Photo that takes 12 young photographers and helps them towards a professional photographic career. Troubridge was subsequently nominated and runner-up as Young Photographer of the Year in 1999 by the International Center of Photography in New York.

Troubridge has been commissioned by Vanity Fair, The Times Magazine, Time, The New York Times, Condé Nast Traveller, Tatler, GQ, Stern, London Evening Standard Magazine and Dazed & Confused.

She has published three monographs. Her first solo work, The Trouble with Amelia focused on the subject of men. Robert Crampton writing in The Times Magazine of her work said: "She sees most men as boys who haven't grown up ... Troubridge's instinct is to celebrate this boyishness rather than reform it or ridicule it or recoil from it".

Her second book Malta Diaries (Trolley Books 2006), with an introduction by Edward de Bono, explored her relationship with the island and its people. It is also a personal exploration of family and traditions passed down from her family, as her mother is Maltese.

Troubridge's third book, Joan of Arc Had Style was published in March 2015 with support from LVMH and De Beers), with a launch and exhibit at the Design Museum in London, as part of the exhibition Women, Fashion, Power.

Troubridge's film and television work includes five of Michael Winterbottom's films, shooting specials and poster campaigns for Wonderland (1999), 24 Hour Party People (2002), A Cock and Bull Story (2006), The Look of Love (2013) and The Face of an Angel (2014). In 2012 Troubridge shot on-set stills and created the poster image for Nick Cave's 20,000 Days on Earth (2014), directed by Iain Forsyth and Jane Pollard. I

Troubridge's work has been exhibited at the Wallace Collection and being exhibited and auctioned at Phillips and Christie's.

== Books ==
- Troubridge, Amelia (2004). The Trouble with Amelia. Booth-Clibborn. ISBN 978-1861542670.
- Troubridge, Amelia (2006). Malta Diaries. Trolley Books. ISBN 978-1904563549.
- Troubridge, Amelia (2015). Joan of ARC Had Style. Trolley Books. ISBN 9781907112508.
