= Waterloo Center for the Arts =

The Waterloo Center for the Arts is an art museum in Waterloo, Iowa. It is home to the largest collection of Haitian art outside of Haiti. It also includes the Phelps Youth Pavilion, where children learn about art through art activities; as well as the Black Hawk Children's Theatre. The center has a permanent section of works by American artist Grant Wood. With Brown University and the Rhode Island School of Design, the Center sponsored a series called Reframing Haiti: Art, History, and Performativity. The center's official slogan is "Stimulating inquiry, provoking dialogue and connecting people through the arts."

== Galleries ==
The Center collects many kinds of art, including art from the American Midwest; American Decorative Arts; and international folk art. It has a significant collection of Mexican folk art, and the world's largest public collection of Haitian art. Its permanent galleries include:

- The Forsberg Riverside Galleries, which focuses on Midwest art, American crafts and Haitian and Caribbean Art
- The Law-Reddington Galleries, with changing exhibits and a theatre
- The Reuling Feldman Galleries, containing a large portion of the center's Haitian art
- The Watkins Grand Foyer, with changing exhibits
- The Langlass Loft Gallery, with Haitian art, and a balcony overlooking the Watkins Grand Foyer and downtown Waterloo
- The Rotary Lichty Gallery, with community outreach exhibits
- The Longfellow Consourse, which includes the Waterloo Community Playhouse, Black Hawk Children's Theatre, changing art exhibits, and a view of the Cedar River
- The Urban Galleries, a series of art installations in downtown storefronts
- West Gallery, with changing exhibits
- The Block-Loomis Consourse, changing art exhibits with children in mind
- Riverloop Sculpture Plaza, with outdoor seating and sculptures from the center's permanent collection

== Other features ==
The Riverloop Amphitheatre is a rentable outdoor space with seating for up to 3,000, where outdoor concerts are held in the summertime.

Mark's Park is a summertime outdoor waterpark/playground for the free use of children. It is named after Mark Young, a Waterloo resident who died in a motorcycle accident in 2003.
