= Lisa Barnard =

British photographer

Lisa Barnard (born 1967) is a British documentary photographer, political artist, and a reader in photography at University of South Wales. She has published the books Chateau Despair (2012), Hyenas of the Battlefield, Machines in the Garden (2014) and The Canary and the Hammer (2019). Her work has been shown in a number of solo and group exhibitions and she is a recipient of the Albert Renger-Patzsch Award.

== Life and work ==
Barnard graduated with a BA in Photography from the University of Brighton in 2005. She gained an MA in Photography with Critical Theory.

Her first book, Chateau Despair, explores the disused Conservative Campaign Headquarters of the UK Conservative Party at 32 Smith Square, Westminster, London – nicknamed Chateau Despair, the scene of many televised historic moments in Conservative history from Margaret Thatcher's victory rallies to Iain Duncan Smith's resignation. "Barnard's images speak of the fleeting nature of political power and the often makeshift working environments that lurk beyond the gaze of the TV camera or the official portrait." Chateau Despair was included in critic Sean O'Hagan's list of "The best independent photobooks of 2013" in The Guardian and New Statesman made it their Picture Book Of The Week.

In the group exhibition Theatres of War, curated by Mark Power in 2007, "Barnard documented the tragically tacky 'care packages' dispatched to American troops stationed abroad". Peter Conrad, reviewing the exhibition in The Guardian explained Barnard's photographs by asking "how can soldiers who ask their families to send them Beanie Babies and whoopee cushions hope to understand the gangs of Islamic insurgents they are fighting?".

Barnard's "complicated and intriguing multimedia project" Virtual Iraq "examines the use of interactive media by the US army to recruit, train and treat military personnel before and after they embark on a tour of duty to the Middle East. It [...] explores the relationship between the US army, virtual reality and the gaming industry" in their Flatworld project. Barnard filmed it at the Institute for Creative Technologies, "a research centre also funded by the military to create training applications using virtual reality in advanced technologies." Gordon MacDonald, reviewing Virtual Iraq in Photoworks Biannual, (Note: Gordon MacDonald's text, Bang bang You're Dead, for Photoworks Biannual 11, is reproduced within Barnard's web site here) said "Barnard’s project does not aim to direct you towards the ridiculous aspects of Flatworld or to point out the serious moral questions its existence raises. It achieves more than this by simply removing Flatworld from its context and holding all of its contradictions still to be viewed."

Her second book, Hyenas of the Battlefield, Machines in the Garden, examines the use of drones in the war on terror.

Barnard was senior lecturer on documentary photography at University of South Wales, then a reader in photography there from 2017.

== Publications by Barnard ==
- Chateau Despair. London: Gost, 2012. ISBN 978-0-9574272-0-4. Essays by Sarah James ("Maggie and the Fairytale of the Free Market") and Jeremy Till ("Six Inches of Power"). Edition of 500 copies.
- Hyenas of the Battlefield, Machines in the Garden. London: Gost, 2014. ISBN 978-0-9574272-9-7. Essays by Julian Stallabrass ("The Missile and the Paperclip") and Eugénie Shinkle ("Drone Aesthetics"). Edition of 750 copies.
- The Canary and the Hammer. London: Mack, 2019. ISBN 978-1-912339-33-4.

== Publications with contributions by Barnard ==
- Bringing the War Home. Bradford, England: Impressions Gallery, 2010. Foreword by Hilary Roberts, essay by Pippa Oldfield. Accompanied the exhibition Bringing the War Home.
- 9213. Brighton, England: University of Brighton, 2013. Edition of 300. Two books in a slipcase with work by 35 University of Brighton alumni in one and that of graduates of 2013 in the other.

== Awards ==
- 2003: Winner, Daily Telegraph/Novartis Visions of Science award, People category.
- 2005: Runner-up, Photographer of the Year, Guardian Student Media Award.
- 2008: Danny Wilson Memorial Award, Brighton Photo Fringe, Brighton, England, for Virtual Iraq.
- 2012: Albert Renger-Patzsch Award 2012, Dietrich Oppenberg Foundation, Museum Folkwang, Essen, Germany. €25000 for her book Hyenas of the Battlefield, Machines in the Garden.
- 2015: First prize, Prestige Grant, Getty Images. USD$15000 for her Sweat of the Sun project.

== Exhibitions ==
=== Solo exhibitions ===
- 2009: Virtual Iraq, Phoenix Place, Lewes, England. Part of Brighton Photo Fringe during Brighton Photo Biennial.
- 2010: Maggie, Coop building, Brighton Photo Fringe, Brighton, England. Shown during Brighton Photo Biennial alongside The Election Project by Simon Roberts.
- 2014: Artist of the Day, selected by Simon Norfolk, Flowers Gallery, London.
- 2015: Hyenas of the Battlefield, Machines in the Garden, Grande Halle, Parc des Ateliers, Rencontres d'Arles, Arles, France, 6 July – 20 September 2015.
- 2022: Lisa Barnard - The Canary and the Hammer, Centre de la photographie Genève

=== Collaborative exhibitions ===
- 2006: Permanent display of holograms of the Children's Laureates (Quentin Blake, Anne Fine, Michael Morpurgo and Jacqueline Wilson), Unicorn Theatre for Children, London. Collaboration with holographic artist Rob Munday.
- 2008: Once Upon a Moment in Time, University of Brighton, Brighton, England, 3 October – 16 November 2008. Collaboration with Annis Joslin.
- 2009: Polska by the Sea, Eastbourne train station, Eastbourne, England. Part of Eastbourne Festival 2009. Photographs by Barnard, text transcriptions of interviews by Mark Hewitt.

=== Group exhibitions ===
- 2007: Theatres of War, Kraków Month of Photography, Schindler Factory, Kraków, Poland. Curated by Mark Power. Also included photographs by Luc Delahaye, Geert van Kesteren, Christopher Stewart and Donovan Wylie. (Note: Mark Power's essay for the 2007 Krakow Photomonth catalogue Theatres of War is made available within his web site here)
- 2010: Bringing the War Home, Impressions Gallery, Bradford, England, 17 September – 14 November 2010. Curated by Pippa Oldfield. Also included photographs by Peter van Agtmael, Sama Alshaibi, Farhad Ahrarnia, Adam Broomberg & Oliver Chanarin, Edmund Clark, Kay May, Asef Ali Mohammad and Christopher Sims.
- 2011: Maggie, Photo50, London Art Fair, London. Curated by Celia Davis for Photoworks with David Spero.
- 2011: Collateral Damage, Look 11 photography festival, Liverpool. Curated by Paul Lowe and Harry Hardie. Included photographs from Barnard's Virtual Iraq as well as photographs by Mishka Henner, Simon Norfolk, Tim Hetherington, Ziyah Gafić, Paul Lowe, Edmund Clark, Ashley Gilbertson, Brett Van Ort, Adam Broomberg & Oliver Chanarin.
- 2011: XXI: Conflicts in a New Century, Oak Cliff Cultural Center, Dallas, TX. Co-curated by Charles Dee Mitchell and Cynthia Mulcahy with images by Barnard, Stephanie Sinclair, James Nachtwey, Chris Anderson, Jamel Shabazz, Eugene Richards, Christopher Morris, Lori Grinker, Rania Matar, Kael Alford and Thorne Anderson, Tim Hetherington, Gary Knight, Natan Dvir, Akintunde Akinleye, Guy Tillim and Fatagoma Silue.
- 2013: Engines of War, Gasser and Grunert, New York. Curated by Charles Dee Mitchell and Cynthia Mulcahy with images by Barnard, David Cotterrell, Jamel Shabazz, Benjamin Lowy, Ghaith Abdul-Ahad, Eugene Richards, Anthony Suau, Christopher Morris, Teun Voeten and Heather Ainsworth.
- 2015: Whiplash Transition, Exposure, Format International Photography Festival, Derby, UK, March–April 2015.
