= Gordon MacDonald (editor) =

British photographer (born 1967)

- Born: 1967 (age 58–59)
- Occupations: photographer and educator

Gordon MacDonald (born 1967) works with photography as an artist, writer, curator, press photographer and educator.

He is the founding editor of Photoworks magazine and was head of publishing at Photoworks in Brighton. He co-founded Brighton Photo Fringe in 2003; and was for a time its chair of the board of trustees. He was co-founder and co-director, alongside Stuart Smith, of the visual arts publisher GOST. MacDonald is also half of the collective MacDonaldStrand, with his wife Clare Strand.

== Life and work ==
'Ideas not careers' logo by MacDonald.

MacDonald was born in East Kilbride, Scotland, in 1967. He worked in photography studios and as a professional photographic printer before studying for a BA in Editorial Photography at the University of Brighton in the 1990s. He has also worked as a photographer, writer, photography curator, press photographer and educator.

MacDonald is the founding editor of Photoworks magazine He stood down as editor at issue 17, in October 2011. During His editorship, MacDonald interviewed photographers and filmmakers Richard Billingham, Martin Parr, Nick Broomfield, and Jeff Wall, and wrote a number of texts on photographers including Osamu Wataya, Martin Lange, Lisa Barnard, Daniel Stier, and Adam Broomberg and Oliver Chanarin.

MacDonald was also head of publishing at Photoworks, the Brighton-based organisation for contemporary photography. He produced and edited his own It's Wrong to Wish on Space Hardware (2003) and The House in the Middle (2004), as well as Joachim Schmid: Photoworks 1982–2007 (2007); Anna Fox: Photographs 1983–2007 (2007); Fig. by Broomberg and Chanarin (2007), Stuart Griffiths: The Myth of the Airborne Warrior (2011), and Daniel Meadows: Edited Photographs from the 70s and 80s (2011).

He co-founded Brighton Photo Fringe in 2003, the fringe festival to Brighton Photo Biennial; and was for a time its chair of the board of trustees.

MacDonald was until September 2016 co-director, alongside Stuart Smith, of the visual arts publisher GOST. GOST published Mass by Mark Power, Brisees by Helen Sear, Chateau Despair and Hyenas of the Battlefield, Machines in the Garden by Lisa Barnard, UKG by Ewen Spencer, Skirts by Clare Strand, Spill by Daniel Beltra, Maidan – Portraits from the Black Square by Anastasia Taylor-Lind, The Winners by Rafał Milach, Punks by Karen Knorr and Oliver Richon and Hong Kong Parr by Martin Parr.

MacDonald is half of the collective MacDonaldStrand, with wife Clare Strand, who make idea based projects. They live in Brighton and have three children.

The Beachers by MacDonaldStrand.

== Publications ==
- The House in the Middle: Photographs of Interior Design in the Nuclear Age. Edited by MacDonald. Brighton: Photoworks, 2004. ISBN 1-903796-14-8. Photographs by Danny Treacy, Paul Reas, John Kippin, Richard Billingham, Jo Broughton, Dirk Wackerfuss, Anne Hardy, John Paul Bichard, The Design Council Archive, the BBC Picture Library, the Collection of Chris Mullen, Protect and Survive and the Los Alamos National Library. Text by Althea Greenan. "Published to coincide with a Photoworks exhibition at the Towner Art Gallery, Eastbourne, in 2004." Edition of 1000 copies.
- It's Wrong to Wish on Space Hardware. Brighton: Photoworks, 2003. ISBN 978-1903796047. Edited by MacDonald, Text by Caroline Smith, photographs by Adam Broomberg and Oliver Chanarin, John Paul Bichard, Nichola Bruce, NASA, Richard Purdy, Steve Pyke, Ian Rawlinson and Joan Fontcuberta.

== Exhibitions curated by MacDonald ==
- Divisive Moments, The Photographers' Gallery, London, 2017. Photographs, documents, books and tape-recordings from the archive of Lt. Colonel Wendelle C. Stevens.
- Guest curator, Krakow Photmonth, Krakow, Poland, 2017. The theme was From the Outside Looking In, with various exhibitions curated by MacDonald: We Also Dance, a group show with Phil Collins, Elaine Constantine, Denis Darzacq, Stéphane Degoutin & Gwenola Wagon, Sirkka-Liisa Konttinen, Zarina Muhammad, Morten Nilsson, Ewen Spencer, Vojtěch Veškrna, and Gillian Wearing, at the Museum of Contemporary Art in Kraków (MOCAK); The War From Here, a group show with Lisa Barnard, Nina Berman, Monica Haller, Sophie Ristelhueber, and Martha Rosler, at Bunkier; Divisive Moments, a show by MacDonald using photographs from UFO archives, at the Ethnographic Museum of Kraków; Grapevine: 1988–1992, a solo show by Susan Lipper at MOCAK; and A New Archaeology for Liban and Płaszów, a solo show by Diana Lelonek at the Ethnographic Museum.
- Tish Murtha: Works 1976 – 1991, The Photographers' Gallery, London, 2018. Co-curated with Val Williams.
