= Ewen Spencer =

British photographer and filmmaker

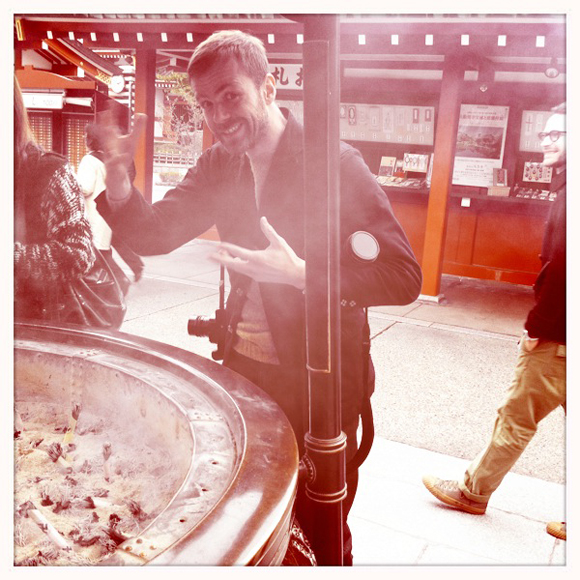
- Born: 1971 (age 54–55); Newcastle upon Tyne, England
- Known for: Photography
- Website: www.ewenspencer.com

Ewen Spencer (born 1971) is a British photographer and filmmaker based in Brighton, England. His photography is primarily of youth and subcultures.

He began his career working for style, music and culture magazines The Face and Sleazenation and has since joined groups of young people and musicians to make personal projects, as well as making films for Massive Attack, The Streets and the Charlatans and undertaking commercial work. His books include Open Mic (2005), UKG (2013), Young Love (2017), and While you Were Sleeping (2022).

== Life and work ==
=== Photography ===
Spencer studied editorial photography under photographers Paul Reas and Mark Power at the School of Art and Design at the University of Brighton. He graduated in 1997.

In 1999, he worked photographing nightlife, such as the UK garage scene, for fashion and lifestyle magazine Sleazenation.

Between 2001 and 2005 Spencer photographed the American rock band The White Stripes. Initially for the NME, he photographed shows from their first UK tour onwards, including candid backstage photographs. In 2010 he self-published Three's a Crowd, documenting the early stages of the band's rise to popularity.

In 2002 photographer Martin Parr tipped Spencer as the most promising newcomer of that year.

Spencer has also photographed London's grime music, which resulted in his book Open Mic, which was awarded a Yellow Pencil certificate for photographic publishing by D&AD in 2005. In his introduction to Open Mic, Martin Parr wrote:

Ewen Spencer has already established his reputation, in recent years, as a photographer of much talent with his work on youth culture, but now he turns his attention to the 'grime' music scene in London... This is where Spencer's quality as a photographer really begins to work. He has thrown himself into this whole scene with such enthusiasm and dedication that he has won over the confidence of the key players on the grime circuit. This demonstrates how the potential magic of contemporary photography begins to operate. Because Spencer's photography is so compelling, the viewer begins to understand what attracted him in the first place... This scene is about energy... Ewen Spencer's photographs are also about energy, making visual sense of the wonderful anarchy of grime. Spencer brings the same raw passion to his photographs; I think those who view them benefit from this engagement.

Writing for the Huffington Post in 2012, Alice Vincent said, "it is his photography from the front line of genuine youth culture that are the most striking. The rituals of sex and socialising are prominent, with Spencer's images seeming to be captured by an invisible voyeur." In a 2012 interview for The Guardian, Spencer named Dick Hebdige, Tom Wood, and Pete Townshend as influences.

In 2013, GOST published Spencer's book of photographs of UK garage, UKG. Writing in The Guardian, Mike Skinner wrote of UKG that:

Ewen's photographs start when the scene was moving at its fastest, and go right up to Moving Too Fast. The first thing I wondered when I saw them was how he didn't get beaten up for snapping such intimate moments of some pretty certified-looking badmen. But my second, more lasting impression was how much more rich in detail they were than my fading typecast memory. . . . But the important and exciting thing about Ewen's photos are that they take you back to the real thing. . . .

In 2016, he was commissioned by Photoworks and Fabrica to produce a body of work for Brighton Photo Biennial. With Kick over the statues, Spencer's intention was to re-establish a belief in youth tribes and style. Young Londoners were cast along the route of the August 2016 Notting Hill Carnival and against locations in Liverpool. These cities celebrate and enhance the idea of a UK diaspora, through style and cultural background with an association to music and culture that recalls the history of British subcultures and invents its own contemporary incarnations. The gallery installation resembled a snapshot of how photography is often encountered in the streets of a modern city. Large format images posted onto custom-built billboards are supplemented with music and projected images.

His photography has appeared in The Guardian and he has worked for the NME, The Face, Nike, Apple, Smirnoff, Footlocker, JD Sports, Sony, Reebok, T-Mobile, Toyota, Vodafone and Channel 4 (photographing on the set of E4's series Skins). He took the inner liner photographs for the album Original Pirate Material by The Streets.

=== Short film directing ===
Spencer's Brandy & Coke (2014), about UK garage, was broadcast on Channel 4 in 2014 as part of the first of their Music Nation music documentary series with Dazed. Writing in The Guardian in 2014, Sam Richards called it "excellent". Open Mic (2014), about grime music, was broadcast in the second series. Ellen E. Jones, writing in The Independent in 2014, said "There are enough ideas in 'Open Mic', the opening film from Ewen Spencer, to justify a whole series of films on grime music alone." In 2015 Spencer was commissioned by i-D to make a four-part series for Channel 4, Street, Sound and Style, describing how music and street style subcultures have changed the face of British pop culture.

== Publications ==
=== Books of work by Spencer ===
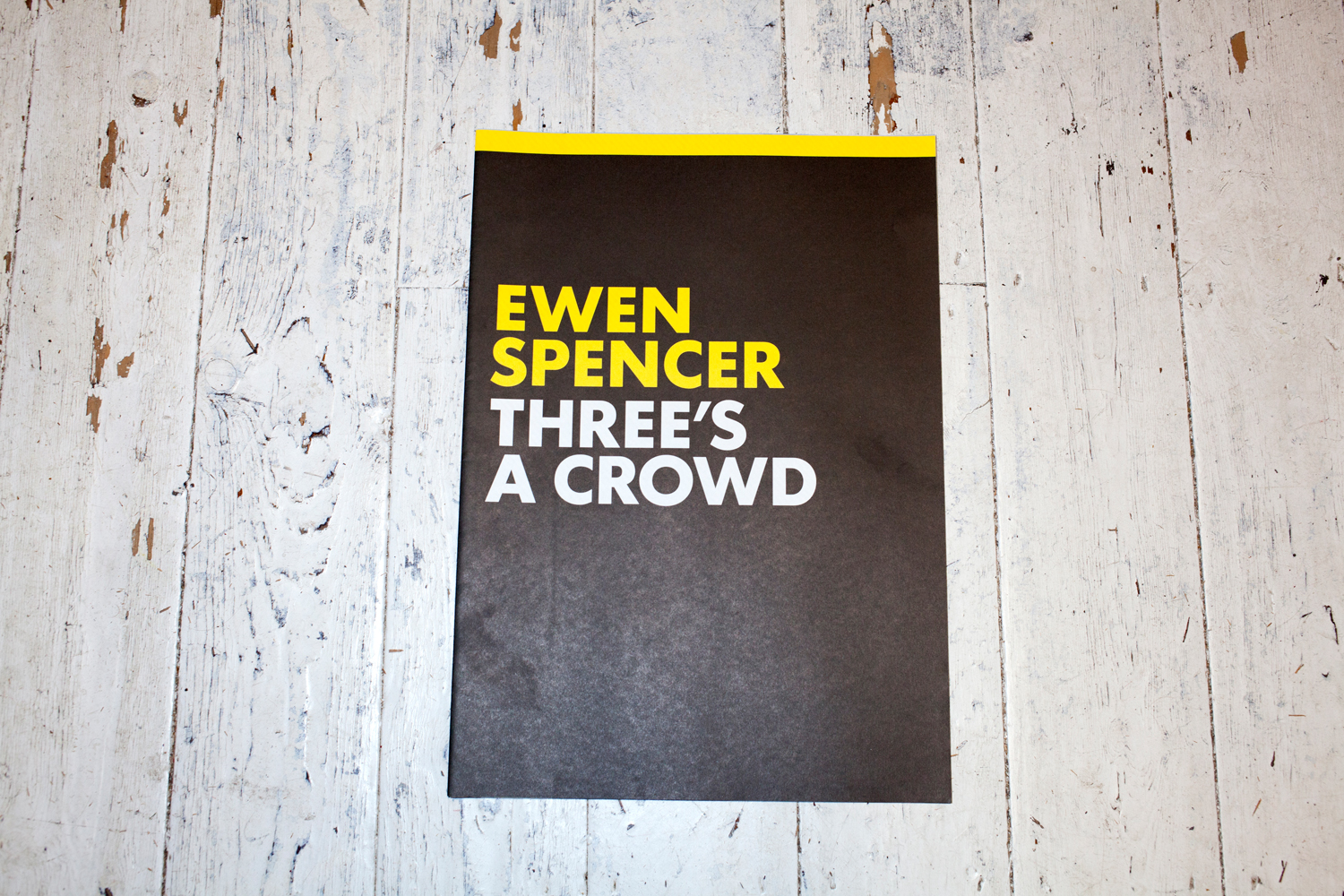
The cover of Three's a Crowd Vol.1

- Open Mic. Self-published, 2005. ISBN 0-9550840-0-8. Photographs of young people involved in the Grime music scene in London. Introductions by Martin Parr and Mike Skinner. (Note: Its website is .)
- UKG. London: GOST, 2013. ISBN 978-0-957427-25-9. Photographs of people involved in UK garage music. Edition of 1,000 copies. With an essay by Jason Evans, "Meanwhile, on the Other Side of Town". (Note: Its web page is .)
- Open Mic Vol.2. Brighton: See-W, 2014. ISBN 9780955084058. Edition of 500 copies. Additional photographs from his Open Mic series plus interviews made for the film Open Mic (2014) with DJ Slimzee, Dizzee Rascal, Kano, Lethal B, Newham Generals, Jammer, JME, Ratty (Lord of the Mics) and Logan Sama.
- Young Love. London: Stanley Barker, 2017. ISBN 9780995555556. Edition of 1000 copies.
- While you Were Sleeping: 1998–2000. Bologna, Italy: Damiani, 2022. ISBN 978-8862087698. With text by Elaine Constantine and an interview with Justin Quirk.
- One night in Watford, 2025. Published by Friends Editions. Edition of 1000 copies.

=== Booklets of work by Spencer ===
- Three's a Crowd Vol. 1. Self-published, 2010. Edition of 500 copies. Photographs of The White Stripes. (Note: Its website is .)
- Three's a Crowd Vol. 2. Self-published, 2011. ISBN 978-0-955084-02-7. Photographs of The White Stripes. (Note: Its website is .)
- Guapamente (issue 1). Self-published, 2013. ISBN 978-0-955084-01-0. Photographs of young people in Naples, Italy. Edition of 300 copies.
- Guapamente (issue 2). Self-published, 2014. Photographs of young people in Marseille, France. Edition of 300 copies.
- Guapamente (issue 3). Self-published, 2014. ISBN 978-0-955084-03-4. Photographs of young people in Miami, FL. Edition of 300 copies.
- Guapamente (issue 4). Brighton: See-W, 2015. ISBN 978-0-9550840-6-5. Photographs of roller skaters in London. Edition of 300 copies.
- Guapamente (issue 5): Bring, Come, Punish. Brighton: ES Books. ISBN 978-0-9550840-4-1. Edition of 200 copies

=== Publications with contributions by Spencer ===
- HOST Portfolio, 8 Magazine, Issue 24: Resistance, Foto8, 2008. (Note: It is available to read at .)

== Films ==
- Brandy & Coke, 2013. 8 m short. Directed by Ewen Spencer, produced by Denna Cartamkhoob, for Dazed
- Brandy & Coke, 2014. 22 m short. Directed by Ewen Spencer, produced by Denna Cartamkhoob and Adam Farley
- Open Mic, 2014. 23 m short. Directed by Ewen Spencer. Commissioned by Channel 4 as part of the Music Nation series.
- Jam and Cheese, 2015. 7 m short. Directed by Ewen Spencer. Commissioned by Dazed.
- Street, Sound and Style, 2015. Four episodes, each 23 m short. Directed by Ewen Spencer, produced by Oz Thakkar. Commissioned by i-D.
- The Business of Grime, 2016, 20m short. Directed by Ewen Spencer, produced by Oz Thakkar and Youern. Commissioned by GQ

== Exhibitions ==
=== Solo exhibitions ===
- Three's a Crowd, KK Outlet, London, 2011
- Teenagers, Third Floor Gallery, Cardiff, 2012
- England's Dreaming, White Cloth Gallery, Leeds, 2012
- Brandy & Coke, Create Studios, Brighton, 2013
- UKG and screenings of Open Mic and Brandy & Coke, Wieden+Kennedy, Amsterdam, 2014
- Kick Over the Statues, co-commissioned by Photoworks and Fabrica for Brighton Photo Biennial, Fabrica Gallery, Brighton, 2016; Hassell, London, 2017

=== Group exhibitions ===
- Facing Youth, Museum de Imagem (as part of Encontras de Imagem festival), Braga, Portugal, 2012
- We Want More: Image-Making and Music in the 21st Century, The Photographers' Gallery, London, 2015. With Roger Ballen, Pep Bonet, Deirdre O'Callaghan, Daniel Cohen, Jason Evans, Ryan Enn Hughes, Inez van Lamsweerde and Vinoodh Matadin, Gareth McConnell, Ryan McGinley, James Mollison, Lorena Turner and Dan Wilton
- We Also Dance, Museum of Contemporary Art in Kraków, Krakow Photmonth, Krakow, Poland, June 2017, with Phil Collins, Elaine Constantine, Denis Darzacq, Stéphane Degoutin & Gwenola Wagon, Sirkka-Liisa Konttinen, Zarina Muhammad, Morten Nilsson, Spencer, Vojtěch Veškrna, and Gillian Wearing. Curated by Gordon MacDonald
