= Monica Haller =

American photographer

Monica Moses Haller (born 1980) is an American photographer. She produced the book Riley and His Story with Riley Sharbonno and Matt Rezac, part of the Veterans' Book Project which she co-runs, both of which are about the U.S led wars in Iraq and Afghanistan. Haller is an assistant professor in the University of Minnesota's Art Department and a 2010 recipient of a Guggenheim Fellowship.

== Life and work ==
Haller was born in Minneapolis. She has an undergraduate degree in Peace and Conflict Studies and an M.F.A. in Visual Studies from the Minneapolis College of Art and Design and a BA studying Philosophy of Violence and Non-Violence from the College of St. Benedict.

Martin Parr and Gerry Badger include Riley and His Story in the third volume of their photobook history, in which they describe it as "more about what the Iraq War did to those involved in it than about the justice of the cause, although its futility — and that of all war — is clearly implied." Riley and His Story is the first volume in a project by Haller, Matthew Rezac and Mark Fox called the Veterans' Book Project. The project involves veterans of and those affect by the Iraq and Afghanistan wars publishing their stories and photographs, made while on duty, as a form of catharsis.

== Grants and awards ==
- 2016: McKnight Foundation's Visual Artist Fellowship
- 2011: MacDowell Colony Artist Residency, Peterborough, New Hampshire
- 2010: Guggenheim Fellowship
- 2010: 50 Books / 50 Covers, American Institute of Graphic Arts (AIGA) Design Award
- 2009–2010: McKnight Foundation Fellowship for Photographers
- 2009: Award of Excellence, London Art Book Fair, Whitechapel
- 2007–2009: Bush Foundation Fellowship for Visual Artists
- 2007: Jerome Foundation Fellowship for Emerging Artists
- 2007: Postgraduate research resident, Massachusetts Institute of Technology, Center for Advanced Visual Studies, Cambridge, Massachusetts
- 2005: University of Minnesota Law School

== Publications ==
- Riley and His Story. Me and my outrage. You and us. Paris: Onestar; Värnamo, Sweden: Fälth & Hässler, 2009. Photos and text by Riley Sharbonno; edit, concept and cover text by Haller; and design by Matthew Rezac and Haller. ISBN 9782915359381. Edition of 1000 copies.
  - Second printing, 2010. Edition of 1000 copies.

== Exhibitions ==
=== Solo exhibitions ===
- Veterans Book Project, f/stop - Festival für Fotografie, Leipzig, Germany
- Beneath the Ground, Minneapolis Institute of Art, Minneapolis, Minnesota, 2014
- The Veterans Book Project, Nomas Foundation, Rome, Italy, 2011/12. Curated by Stefano Chiodi.

=== Group exhibitions ===
- The War From Here, group show with Lisa Barnard, Nina Berman, Haller, Sophie Ristelhueber, and Martha Rosler at Krakow Photmonth, Krakow, Poland, 2017. Curated by Gordon MacDonald.
