= Preston is My Paris =

Multidisciplinary arts project

Preston is My Paris Publishing
- Founded: 2009
- Founders: Adam Murray and Robert Parkinson
- Country of origin: UK
- Official website: prestonismyparis.co.uk

Preston is My Paris Publishing (PPP) is a photography-based project that creates publications, site-specific installations, live events, digital applications, education, writing, talks and workshops. It was started in 2009 by Adam Murray (born 1983, Loughborough) and Robert Parkinson (born 1986, Burnley) as a photocopied zine with the intention of encouraging the exploration of Preston as a subject for creative practice and to focus more attention on the city. It has been described as "politically and photographically aware", "photographing and publishing a view of a disregarded, ordinary Britain" "in a playful way".

It has self-published numerous publications in zine, newspaper and book formats, which have been included in exhibitions and are held in public collections at the Tate Library, Fotomuseum Winterthur Collection, Manchester Metropolitan University Artists’ Books Special Collection, London College of Communication Special Collection and National Art Library.

== History ==
Adam Murray and Robert Parkinson started Preston is My Paris to inspire interest in Preston, Lancashire, because they "noticed a distinct lack of creative work in the city and likewise work that featured the city as a focal point." Between 2009 and 2011 they self-published and gave away for free a mostly monthly series of photocopied zines with original contemporary documentary photographs, found imagery, objects and writing related to the city. They called it Preston is My Paris after a TV commercial for Clarks shoes. Jamie Hawkesworth was later occasionally involved in the project.

It went on to publish a series in zine and newspaper formats under the name Preston is My Paris Publishing "documenting aspects of Britain in a quirky English way. Inspired by the French novelist Georges Perec's interest in 'little pieces of everydayness'". It used cheap or vernacular print formats and lower end print production such as photocopying and newspaper to make them more accessible, given away for free or sold at low cost. It expanded into site-specific installations, live events, digital applications, education, writing, talks and workshops.

In 2010 it held a fashion shoot using only clothes from local shops and markets, models scouted on the street in Preston, and an empty unit in a run-down shopping centre for an ad-hoc photography studio and gallery. They used fashion imagery "because it's so widely accessible" and "also wanted to address the way the North is presented in fashion photography." Murray said "Fashion is about so much more than a few fashionable people in London, ... It's peoples' identity and self-expression." The resulting zine, Denim, was considered by the British Journal of Photography to be "an arresting 14-page story".

Also in 2010 Murray, Parkinson and Haweksworth spent several weeks in Preston bus station, photographing the architecture and its community of users (mostly young disadvantaged teenagers) because it was scheduled for demolition. They set up a project space for a weekend in a disused shop there. The project engaged the community and the subsequent zine that they gave away for free, Preston Bus Station, became a tool in the successful campaign to save the bus station. Preston Bus Station became collectible in the art photography scene.

== Reception ==
Parr and Badger include You could be in London, You could be in Vegas, But you’re in Brierfield (2010) and Thank you for travelling with Northern Rail (2012) in the third volume of their photobook history. The former publication was described by The Daily Telegraph in its weekly feature highlighting a photo book. Jason Evans, writing in Photoworks Issue 16, gave the project's publications and strategy a favourable review, he said it was "a refreshing position on politically and photographically aware self-publishing". Preston is my Paris was Dazed and Confused magazine's 'Zine of the Month' in February 2010.

== Publications ==
- Preston is my Paris. Zine format. Original photographs, found imagery, objects and writing related to the city of Preston. Editions of 50–75 copies.
  - Preston is my Paris: Issue 1. Self-published, 2009.
  - Preston is my Paris: Issue 2. Self-published, 2009.
  - Preston is my Paris: Issue 3. Self-published, 2009.
  - Preston is my Paris: Issue 4. Self-published, 2009.
  - Preston is my Paris: Issue 5. Self-published, 2009.
  - Preston is my Paris: Issue 6. Self-published, 2009.
  - Preston is my Paris: Issue 7. Self-published, 2009.
  - Preston is my Paris: Issue 8. Self-published, 2009.
  - Preston is my Paris: Issue 9. Self-published, 2010.
  - Preston is my Paris: Issue 10.
  - Preston is my Paris: Issue 11.
  - Preston is my Paris: Issue 12.
  - Preston is my Paris: Issue 13.
  - Preston is my Paris: Issue 14.
  - Preston is my Paris: Issue 15. Self-published, 2011.
- You could be in London, You could be in Vegas, But you’re in Brierfield. Self-published, 2010. By Adam Murray and Robert Parkinson. Photographs taken in Brierfield Working Men's Club, Brierfield, Lancashire, 31 December 2012 – 1 January 2013. Edition of 50 copies.
- Thank you for travelling with Northern Rail. Self-published, 2010. By Adam Murray. Edition of 50 copies.
- Denim. Self-published, 2010. Fashion photographs with clothing and models sourced in Preston over one weekend and shot in a project space in the Guild Hall Arcade, Preston. Edition of 50 copies.
- Tokyo. Self-published, 2010. Photographs taken in Tokyo, Japan. Edition of 50 copies.
- Coliseum. Self-published, 2010. A collection of 35 mm film found in the Coliseum cinema in Preston. Edition of 50 copies.
- Routes 1. Self-published, 2010. Routes used to navigate Preston plotted and used to explore Paris. Edition of 75 copies.
- Preston Bus Station. Self-published, 2010. By Adam Murray, Robert Parkinson, Jamie Hawkesworth and Aidan Turner-Bishop. Photographs of the bus station and the people that use it. Newspaper format. Edition of 500 copies.
- Ancient Norse Is Not A Luxury. Self-published, 2010. Photographs taken on 10 November 2010 at the student and lecturer protest against the proposed rise in tuition fees. Edition of 50 copies.
- Nogent-sur-Marne. Self-published, 2011. Photographs taken in Nogent-sur-Marne, France, 11–12 September 2010. Edition of 50 copies.
- Derby. Self-published, 2011. Photographs by Jamie Hawkesworth, Adam Murray and Robert Parkinson. Photographs taken in Derby, commissioned for Format International Photography Festival 2011. Newspaper format. Edition of 1000 copies.
- Industria, Virtus, et Fortitudo. Self-published, 2011. By Jamie Hawkesworth, Adam Murray and Robert Parkinson. Photographs of people, streets and urban landscapes taken in Derby 21–23 January 2011. Accompanies Derby. Edition of 100 copies.
- In A State. Self-published, 2011. Photographs taken in North East America, 27 December 2010 – 7 January 2011. Edition of 50 copies.
- Two Changes. Self-published, 2011. Photographs taken in East and North England, 3–6 March 2011. Edition of 50 copies.
- Find. Self-published, 2011. A four publication set produced as outcome of Find project at Brighton Photo Fringe 2012. With a text by David Campany. Edition of 50 copies.
- PIE (Preston Institute of the Everyday): Public Transport. Newspaper format. Self-published, 2011.
- M&M Line. Self-published, 2012. By Robert Parkinson. Photographs taken from Manchester to Llanelli, 17–20 February 2012. Edition of 50 copies.
- Winterthur. Self-published, 2012. Photographs taken in Winterthur, Switzerland, 27–29 January 2012. Edition of 50 copies.
- Road and Rail Links Between Sheffield and Manchester. Mass Observation (Note: This Mass Observation is a UK publishing company set up in 2009 by Theo Simpson and Ben Maclaughlin, not the Mass-Observation of the 1940s, 1950s and 1960s) / Preston Is My Paris, 2012. By Adam Murray and Theo Simpson. Hardback. Edition of 500 copies.
- We don’t mind people on shoulders. Just not under the ceiling fan. Self-published, 2013. Photographs taken at a northern soul night, the Bird Trap, Brierfield Working Men's Club, New Year's Eve, 2012/2013. Edition of 100 copies.
- Edith’s Scrapbook. Self-published, 2013. By Adam Murray. Newspaper clippings, protest posters and photographs, and written letters to the government, relating to various political protests that Mrs Edith Spalding was involved with in the 1970s and 80s, extracted from a single scrapbook.
  - Edith’s Scrapbook. Edition of 100 copies.
  - Edith’s Scrapbook. 'Protest Mix' edition with photographs, poster and audio cassette collated and assembled by Robert Parkinson and Rob Griffiths. Edition of 50 copies.
- The North West. Self-published, 2015. By Adam Murray and Robert Parkinson. Edition of 200 copies.
- The North West 2. Self-published, 2016. By Adam Murray and Robert Parkinson.
- Preston is my Paris 2009–2019. New York: Dashwood, 2019. Photographs by Philip Aarons, Matthew Brown, Sarah Fisher, Jamie Hawkesworth, Iris Lunt, and Laurence Vecten. ISBN 9780996657471. Edition of 500 copies.

== Other media ==
- Protest Mix. R&R09/50. PPP, 2013. Audio cassette, 22 minutes each side of "Field Recordings". (Note: The contents are available here at the Preston is My Paris Soundcloud page) Included with an edition of Edith’s Scrapbook.
- Preston is My Paris. iOS mobile app version of the zine.
- PIE (Preston Institute of the Everyday): Public Transport. 2011. A mobile app version of the print publication.
- Preston is My Paris presents PIE. 2011. Podcast. A soundscape relating to the subject matter of PIE (Preston Institute of the Everyday): Public Transport.

== Contributions to publications ==
- Archizines. ("On Instruments for Engagement" by Adam Murray). London: Bedford Press, 2011. ISBN 978-1-907414-20-6. Edited by Elias Redstone. Catalogue for an exhibition at Architectural Association School of Architecture. (Note: A PDF copy is available here at the University of Central Lancashire web site)
- Art Licks Issue 7. ("From the North: Theo Simpson"). Art Licks, 2012. Edited by Holly Willats.
- Art Licks Issue 8. ("From the North: Museum of Transport"). Art Licks, 2012. Edited by Holly Willats.
- Art Licks Issue 9. ("From the North: Ayesha Jones"). Art Licks, 2012. Edited by Holly Willats.
- Photoworks Issue 19. ("Preston is my Paris: Four Versions of Three Routes"). Brighton: Photoworks, 2012. Edited by Ben Burbridge and Celia Davies.
- Photography and the Artists’ Book. ("PPP: Preston, Paris, Process"). Edinburgh: Museums Etc., 2012. Paperback ISBN 978-1-907697-50-0; hardback ISBN 978-1-907697-51-7; eBook ISBN 978-1-907697-97-5. By Adam Murray and Diane Smyth. Edited by Jonathan Carson, Theresa Wilkie and Rosie Miller.
- The Blue Notebook Journal for Artists’ Books, Vol. 6 No, 2. ("The Poetic Archive: Photography, Everyday Life and the Tactic of Self Publishing"). Impact Press, 2012. ISSN 1751-1712. Edited by Sarah Bodman. (Note: A PDF copy is available here at the University of Central Lancashire web site)
- Art Licks Issue 10. ("From the North: Manchester"). Art Licks, 2013. Edited by Holly Willats.

== Exhibitions ==
=== Solo exhibitions ===
- 2010: Guild Hall Arcade, Preston, 6–28 February 2010.
- 2012: Four Versions of Three Routes, 40 site-specific street posters at various locations, Brighton Photo Biennial, Brighton, England, 6 October – 4 November 2012. Directed by Adam Murray, photographs by Jamie Hawkesworth, Adam Murray, Robert Parkinson and Theo Simpson.
- 2013: Preston Pavilion, WE Festi-Conference for Creative Collectives, Jerusalem Season of Culture, Jerusalem, Israel, 14–15 August 2013.
- 2015: Always Better to be Hard, Caustic Coastal, Manchester, 6–8 February 2015. By Adam Murray and Oscar Godfrey. Site-specific.

=== Exhibitions with contributions by Preston is My Paris ===
- 2010: Self Publish, Be Happy Weekend, Photographers' Gallery, London, 5–6 June 2010.
- 2011: PIY (Publish it Yourself), fr:Maison d'art Bernard-Anthonioz, Paris, 11–12 September 2010.
- 2011: Archizines, Architectural Association School of Architecture, London, 5 November – 14 December 2011. Zines and video interviews with their creators.
- 2011: Find, Brighton Photo Fringe Open '11, Phoenix, Brighton, 18 November – 18 December 2011. Original commission.
- 2012: Book Days, Curated Tables, C/O, Berlin, 26 May 2012.
- 2014: Everything is About to Happen, Greengrassi / Corvi-Mora gallery, London, 14 March – 26 April 2014.
- 2014: Don't Stop Now: Fashion Photography Next, Foam Fotografiemuseum Amsterdam, Amsterdam, 11 July – 7 September 2014.
- 2014: Everything is About to Happen, part of The Library Vaccine, Artists Space, New York, 25 September – 16 November 2014.

== Collections ==
- Tate Library, London.
- Fotomuseum Winterthur Collection.
- Artists’ Books Special Collections, Manchester Metropolitan University.
- Special Collections, London College of Communication, London.
- National Art Library, Victoria and Albert Museum, London.

== See also ==
- Mass-Observation
