= Anthony Luvera =

Australian artist, writer and educator

Anthony Luvera (born 1974) is an Australian artist, writer and educator, living in London. He is a socially engaged artist who works with photography on collaborative projects, which have included working with those who have experienced homelessness and LGBT+ people. Luvera is an associate professor of photography at Coventry University.

Stories from Gilded Pavements was shown in 12 central London Underground stations and is held in the collection of London Transport Museum. Frequently Asked Questions (with Gerald Mclaverty) was shown at Tate Liverpool. Agency, a collaborative project with people experiencing homelessness, was part of Coventry UK City of Culture 2021.

== Career ==
Luvera is an Associate Professor of Photography in the Research Centre for Arts, Memory and Communities, at Coventry University. He is also Chair of the Education Committee at the Royal Photographic Society.

He edits Photography for Whom?, a journal about socially engaged photography, which he set up in 2019.

Luvera has worked extensively with people who have experienced homelessness. Many of these projects use his "assisted self-portrait" methodology, where the subject of the photograph, assisted by Luvera, makes and selects the pictures. One project, Stories from Gilded Pavements, was displayed in 12 central London Underground stations in 2005, part of Art on the Underground. In another, Agency, a commission for Coventry UK City of Culture 2021, participants documented their experiences and places in the city of significance to them, and created assisted self-portraits. The photographs were shown along Warwick Row in Coventry and in a free newspaper distributed across the city. In a project called Construct, Luvera worked in the kitchens for a year at a Birmingham homelessness charity, through which he met people that made assisted self-portraits.

In another ongoing project on homelessness, Luvera and Gerald Mclaverty have conducted iterations of their Frequently Asked Questions. This project involves sending basic questions to councils across the UK, asking how to access systems of care for people experiencing homelessness. Many councils fail to respond, treat the questions as freedom of information requests, or reply with automated lists of links. The resulting exhibitions collate information about the range of responses from councils.

in 2013/14, with Not Going Shopping, Luvera made collaborative self-portraits with LGBT+ people in Brighton and Hove. The portraits were exhibited as large-format posters in outdoor public spaces across the city and copies of a newspaper were distributed for free. In 2017 in Northern Ireland, for 'LGBTQ Visions of Peace in a Society Emerging from Conflict', Luvera conducted a similar project with 7 participants: Let Us Eat Cake. This project was published as a book and exhibited in galleries.

== Publications ==
=== Publications by Luvera ===
- Residency. Belfast: Belfast Exposed, 2011. By Luvera. With essays by Luvera, Anthony Downey, and Colin Graham. Edited by Karen Downey. ISBN 9780952421771. Edition of 1000 copies.
- Not Going Shopping. Brighton: Photoworks, 2014. Newspaper format. Edition of 3000 copies. Photographs and text by Luvera, J Bayliss, Raphael Fox, Ten Harber, Sarah Magdalena Love, Kelly McBride, Harry Pygar, Luc Raesmith, Matt Robinson, Kate Turner, Edward Whelan, and Charlie Wood. (Note: Not Going Shopping can be viewed here within the Photoworks site.)
- Let Us Eat Cake. Belfast: Belfast Exposed, 2017. By Luvera, Paul Campbell, Sarah Cromie, Raymond Dunn, Chris Finlay, Rachael Kathleen, Natalie McFall, and Ciaran Rafferty. ISBN 978-0956176639. With an essay by Edwin Coomasaru, "Queer life and kindship : Anthony Luvera's Let us eat cake (2017)".
- Agency. Coventry: Coventry UK City of Culture, 2021. Newspaper format. Photographs and text by Luvera, Amy Howard, Arshak Lanin, Bengy S, Bernie Howard, Cecelia Stower, Dualeh Alu Dualeh, Jason Reid, John Kiely, Ken Hornblow, Martin, Mick Bickley, Robyn Rainbow, Sim Ford, Sue Sadler and Tracy Villiers. Edition of 3000 copies.

=== Books edited by Luvera ===
- Queer in Brighton. Brighton: New Writing South, 2014. Edited by Luvera and Maria Jastrzębska. Includes Not Going Shopping. ISBN 9-780-992-826-000.

=== Journals edited by Luvera ===
- Photography for Whom?. Issue 1, 2019.
- Photography for Whom?. Issue 2, 2021.

=== Publications with contributions by Luvera ===
- Photography and Collaboration: From Conceptual Art to Crowdsourcing. Bloomsbury; Routledge, 2017. By Daniel Palmer. Hardback, ISBN 9781474233460. Paperback, ISBN 9781350008311.

== Exhibitions ==
- Stories from Gilded Pavements, at 12 London Underground stations, London, 2005. Part of Art on the Underground.
- Frequently Asked Questions, with Gerald Mclaverty, Brighton Photo Fringe, 2014; Tate Liverpool, 2018; Peoples Republic of Stokes Croft, Bristol, 2019; The Gallery at Foyles, London, 2020
- Let Us Eat Cake, Belfast Exposed, Belfast, Northern Ireland, 2017; Derry Playhouse, Derry, Northern Ireland, 2018
- Agency, Warwick Row, Coventry, 2021. Part of Home: Arts & Homelessness Festival and Coventry UK City of Culture 2021.

== Collections ==
- London Transport Museum, London: 8 posters (as of June 2021)
