= Julian Stallabrass =

British art historian, photographer and curator

- Born: 1960 (age 65–66); London, United Kingdom
- Education: Courtauld Institute of Art (PHD, 1992)
- Known for: Art writing, cultural criticism
- Notable work: High Art Lite, Internet Art, Contemporary Art: A Very Short Introduction, Killing for Show
- Website: julianstallabrass.wordpress.com

Julian Stallabrass is a British art historian, art critic, photographer and curator. He was educated at Leighton Park School and New College, Oxford University where he studied PPE (Philosophy, Politics, and Economics). He obtained an MA and PhD in Art History from the Courtauld Institute of Art. While he has broad theoretical interests, he has been influenced by Marxism, particularly influenced by the work of the Frankfurt School. He has written extensively on modern and contemporary art (including internet art), photography and the history of twentieth-century British art.

== Life and work ==
Stallabrass was previously a professor at the Courtauld Institute of Art, University of London. He left the Courtauld in 2022 and is now an independent writer and curator.

He is on the editorial board of the New Left Review.

Stallabrass was highly critical of the Young British Artists movement, and their works and influence were the subject of his 1999 study High Art Lite, a term he coined as a disparaging synonym to the pervasive YBA acronym:

"As the art market revived [in the early- to mid- 1990s] and success beckoned, the new art became more evidently two-faced, looking still to the mass media and a broad audience but also to the particular concerns of the narrow world of art-buyers and dealers. To please both was not an easy task. Could the artists face both ways at once, and take both sets of viewers seriously? That split in attention, I shall argue, led to a wide public being successfully courted but not seriously addressed. It has left a large audience for high art lite intrigued but unsatisfied, puzzled at the work's meaning and wanting explanations that are never vouchsafed: the aim of this book is to suggest the direction some of those answers might take and to do so in a style that is as accessible as the art it examines."

He curated the exhibition Art and Money Online at Tate Britain, London in 2001. In 2008 he selected the Brighton Photo Biennial and from the catalogue of which he edited the book Memory of Fire: Images of War and The War of Images (2013)

His more recent work has explored the globalisation of art world, the documentary mode in contemporary art, the history of war photography, and the relation between political and cultural populism. He curated the main exhibition of the 2023 Thessaloniki PhotoBiennale on the theme of populism in photography.

== Publications ==
=== Books by Stallabrass ===
- Killing for Show: Photography, War, and the Media in Vietnam and Iraq (2020, Rowman and Littlefield; ISBN 978-1-5381-4180-9)
- Contemporary Art: A Very Short Introduction (2020, Oxford University Press; ISBN 978-0-19-882662-0)
- Ριζοσπαστικεσ Πραγματικοτητεσ: Η Φωτογραφια ωσ Πολιτικη Πρακτικη; English translation: Radical Realities: Photography as Political Practice (2018, University Studio Press; ISBN 960-12-2386-X)
- Art Incorporated: The Story of Contemporary Art (2004), republished as Contemporary Art: A Very Short Introduction (2006, Oxford University Press; ISBN 978-0192806468)
- Internet Art: The Online Clash of Culture and Commerce (2003, Tate Gallery Publishing; ISBN 978-1854373458)
- Paris Pictured (2002, Abrams; ISBN 978-0810966406)
- High Art Lite: British Art in the 1990s (1999, Verso; ISBN 9781859843185)
  - High Art Lite: The Rise and Fall of Young British Art (Revised and Expanded edition) (2006, Verso; ISBN 978-1844670857)
- Gargantua: Manufactured Mass Culture. (1996, Verso; ISBN 978-1859840368)

=== Books edited by Stallabrass ===
- The Spectre of the People: Thessaloniki PhotoBiennale (2023, Macedonia University Press; ISBN 978-618-5426-38-5)
- Red Art: New Utopias in Data Capitalism (2014, Leonardo Electronic Almanac, Volume 20 Issue 1; ISBN 978-1-906897-28-4), co-editors Lanfranco Aceti, Susanne Jaschko
- Memory of Fire: Images of War and The War of Images (2013, Photoworks; ISBN 978-1903796498)
- Documentary: Documents of Contemporary Art (2013, Whitechapel Gallery/MIT Press; ISBN 9780262518291) with contributions by James Agee, Ariella Azoulay, Walter Benjamin, Adam Broomberg & Oliver Chanarin, Judith Butler, Georges Didi-Huberman, John Grierson, David Levi Strauss, Elizabeth McCausland, Carl Plantinga, Jacques Rancière, Martha Rosler, Jean-Paul Sartre, Allan Sekula, W. Eugene Smith, Susan Sontag, Hito Steyerl and Trinh T. Minh-ha.
- Locus Solus: Technology, Identity and Site in Contemporary Art (1999, Black Dog Publishing; ISBN 978-1901033618), co-editor Duncan McCorquodale
- Occupational Hazard: Critical Writing on Recent British Art (1998, Black Dog Publishing; ISBN 0-9521773-8-2), co-editors Duncan McCorquodale, Naomi Siderfin
- Ground Control: Technology and Utopia (1997, Black Dog Publishing, ISBN 978-0952177326), co-editors Duncan McCorquodale, Lolita Jablonskiene

== Curated exhibitions ==
- The Spectre of the People, Thessaloniki PhotoBiennale, October 2023 – February 2024
- Failing Leviathan: Magnum and Civil War, National Civil War Centre, May–November 2015
- Memory of Fire: Images of War and the War of Images, Brighton Photo Biennial, May 2008
- Art Now: Art and Money Online, Tate Britain, March–June 2001
