= Zwehl =

Zwehl is a German surname. Notable people with the surname include:

- Bettina von Zwehl (born 1971), German photographer
- Julia Zwehl (born 1976), German field hockey player
- Hans von Zwehl (1851–1926), German general of WWI
