= Wendelle Stevens =

American ufologist (1923–2010)

- Born: January 18, 1923; Round Prairie, Minnesota, United States
- Died: September 7, 2010 (aged 87); Tucson, Arizona, United States

Wendelle Stevens (January 18, 1923-September 7, 2010) was an American military officer and ufologist.

Stevens was born in Round Prairie, Minnesota and, after graduating high school, enlisted in the U.S. Army. He eventually earned a commission in the U.S. Army Air Corps and retired from the U.S. Air Force in 1962 at the rank of Lieutenant colonel.

While serving in the Air Force in Alaska, Stevens became interested in UFOs and devoted his retirement to studying the subject. He became known for his chronicling of Billy Meier, and asserted the famous Meier photographs of purported UFOs had not been manipulated and represented actual imagery of an alien spaceship. (Note: In 1997, Meier's ex-wife said that the photos were of spaceship models Meier built with household objects, and that he had made-up his stories of alien contact.) Stevens spent nearly three months with Meier in Switzerland, and claimed that — during his visit — Meier was abducted by aliens while standing just a few feet away, though Stevens said his back was turned at the time so he didn't see the alleged kidnapping.

According to Stevens, he had the world's largest private collection of UFO photographs. He was a frequent contributor of articles to UFO magazines.

In 1982, Stevens was arrested and charged on multiple counts of child molestation and inappropriate sexual contact with minors, pleading guilty to nine of the charges. He was sentenced to seven years imprisonment. Stevens and his supporters within Ufology would later claim he was framed by the CIA because he had come too close to learning the truth about UFOs. Investigative author Kal Korff, in this book Spaceships of the Pleiades, contests the accuracy of several assertions Stevens made to support his claims of being framed.

Stevens was released from prison on parole in 1988, thereafter returning to the study of UFOs.

== Legacy ==
In 2017, Huck described Stevens as "one of the most famous UFO researchers". That year, selections from his photographic collection were curated for display by Gordon MacDonald in an exhibition at the Photographers' Gallery.

== Works ==
- Stevens, Wendell (1980). UFO Contact From The Pleiades. ISBN 9780937850022.
