= Chris Stewart =

Chris or Christopher Stewart may refer to:

== Entertainment ==
- Chris Stewart (author) (born 1951), former member (drummer) of British band Genesis
- Christopher Stewart (artist) (born 1966), British visual artist and educator
- Christopher S. Stewart, American author
- Chris Stewart (1946–2020), Northern Irish bass player and session musician associated with Eire Apparent and Spooky Tooth
- Chris Stewart, former lead guitarist for the rock band Black Veil Brides
- Christopher Stewart, a.k.a. Tricky Stewart (born 1977), American rapper and music producer

== Others ==
- Chris Stewart (baseball) (born 1982), American MLB player
- Chris Stewart (ice hockey, born 1961), Canadian ice hockey coach
- Chris Stewart (ice hockey, born 1987), Canadian hockey player
- Chris Stewart (Utah politician) (born 1960), American author, businessman, politician, and former Air Force pilot
- Chris Stewart (Connecticut politician), member of the Connecticut House of Representatives

== See also ==
- Kris Stewart (born 1967), English football club chairman
- Chris Stuart (born 1948), British journalist
