= Jamie Hawkesworth =

British photographer

Jamie Hawkesworth is a British fashion and documentary photographer.

Hawkesworth's first photography project was made in Preston bus station as a member of the collective Preston is My Paris. The work was published in their 2010 self-published newspaper as well as in his own 2017 book, both called Preston Bus Station. That experience has influenced his work since, shooting fashion campaigns, catalogues and editorials.

He has had solo exhibitions at The Hepworth Wakefield in Wakefield, UK; Red Hook Labs in Brooklyn, New York City; and Huis Marseille in Amsterdam; the latter showing a mix of his personal as well as his commercial photography.

== Life and work ==
Hawkesworth grew up in Ipswich. He first used a camera in 2007 as part of his studies for a forensic science degree at the University of Central Lancashire in Preston. He subsequently switched to a photography degree, graduating in 2009.

His first completed photography project was Preston Bus Station, street photography, portraits of people, and a short film made over three years in Preston bus station in North West England, including one whole month spent there. It was made as a member of the collective Preston is My Paris. The photographs were included in the group's 2010 self-published newspaper, as well as in Hawkesworth's own 2017 monograph. He has said of the project "it informed how I understand light, how I approach people. It’s at the heart of the way I see things."

His fashion work has included shooting campaigns and catalogues for JW Anderson and Loewe (both in collaboration with Jonathan Anderson), and editorials for Vogue, Fantastic Man, and T: The New York Times Style Magazine.

Hawkesworth uses the same Mamiya RB67 medium format film camera and lens for all his work, and develops and makes his own prints.

In 2014 the British Journal of Photography pronounced Hawkesworth "One to Watch". In 2017 The New York Times said he is "feted as one of the most talented fashion photographers of his generation". His images have been described by I.D. as being "defined by their romantic warmth, simple beauty, and emotional openness". In 2018 he received the Award for Editorial, Advertising and Fashion Photography, from the Royal Photographic Society.

== Publications ==
=== Publications by Hawkesworth ===
- Preston Bus Station. New York City: Dashwood, 2017. ISBN 9780996657426. Edition of 2000 copies.
- On Keeping a Notebook. The Gould Collection Volume 4. Gould, 2019. Photographs and drawings by Hawkesworth and an essay by Joan Didion. ISBN 978-0-9973596-5-7. Edition of 1000 copies.
- The British Isles. London: Mack, 2021. ISBN 978-1-913620-14-1.

=== Lookbooks photographed by Hawkesworth ===
- Loewe Spring Summer 2015 Menswear Collection. Edition of 1200 copies.
- Publication No. 8. Loewe, 2015. Loewe Spring Summer 2016. Edition of 1000 copies.
- Publication No. 9. Loewe, 2016. Loewe Autumn Winter 2016.
- Publication No. 11. Loewe, 2016. Loewe Spring Summer 2017 Menswear Collection.
- Loewe Spring Summer 2017 Paula's Ibiza.
- Publication No. 12. Loewe, 2016. Loewe Spring Summer 2017 Women's Collection.
- Publication No.15. Loewe, 2017. Loewe Fall Winter 2017/2018
- Loewe Spring Summer 2018 Menswear Collection.

=== Newspapers made as a member of Preston is My Paris ===
- Preston Bus Station. Preston: Preston is My Paris, 2010. By Hawkesworth, Adam Murray, Robert Parkinson, and Aidan Turner-Bishop. Newspaper format. Edition of 500 copies. Photographs of Preston bus station and the people that use it.
- Derby. Preston: Preston is My Paris, 2011. By Hawkesworth, Murray, and Parkinson. Newspaper format. Edition of 1000 copies. Photographs taken in Derby, commissioned for Format International Photography Festival 2011.
- Industria, Virtus, et Fortitudo. Preston: Preston is My Paris, 2011. By Hawkesworth, Murray, and Parkinson. Accompanies Derby. Edition of 100 copies. Photographs of people, streets and urban landscapes taken in Derby 21–23 January 2011.

=== Publications with contributions by Hawkesworth ===
- Fashion Photography Next. London: Thames & Hudson, 2014. Edited by Magdalene Keaney and Eleanor Weber. ISBN 9780500544358.
- Self Publish, Be Happy: A DIY Photobook Manual and Manifesto. New York City: Aperture, 2015. By Bruno Ceshel. ISBN 9781597113441.
- North: Volume One. Preston: University of Central Lancashire, 2015. Edited by Brian Morrison, John Aitken, and Adam Murray. ISBN 978-1-909755-04-8.
- Disobedient Bodies: JW Anderson at The Hepworth Wakefield. London: InOtherWords, 2017. Edited by Andrew Bonacina. ISBN 978-0-9932238-2-2. Edition of 2000 copies.

== Films ==
- Preston Bus Station (2013) – short film

== Exhibitions ==
=== Solo exhibitions ===
- Wakefield Kids, The Hepworth Wakefield, Wakefield, UK, 2017.
- A Short, Pleasurable Journey: 51 Photographs by Jamie Hawkesworth, Red Hook Labs, Brooklyn, New York City, 2016.
- An Endless Rhythm, JW Anderson Workshops, London, 2016. "Scenes and people Hawkesworth encountered on a trip to Russia ... alongside charcoal drawings he made during his time there."
- Landscape with Tree, Huis Marseille, Amsterdam, 2017. Various personal and commercial work including Preston Bus Station.
- A blue painted fence, Aylesbury Street, London, December 2018. Includes "film, drawings, and writing, as well as new photographs from Kenya, Louisiana and Romania".

=== Group exhibitions ===
- Four Versions of Three Routes, 40 site-specific street posters at various locations, Brighton Photo Biennial, Brighton, UK, 2012. Directed by Adam Murray and with photographs by the Preston is My Paris photographers Murray, Robert Parkinson, Hawkesworth, and Theo Simpson.
- North: Identity, Photography, Fashion, Open Eye Gallery, Liverpool, UK; North: Fashioning Identity, Somerset House, London, 2017. Curated by Lou Stoppard and Adam Murray.

== Awards ==
- 2018: Award for Editorial, Advertising and Fashion Photography, Royal Photographic Society, Bath
