= Sleazenation =

British lifestyle magazine

- Categories: Fashion magazine
- Frequency: Monthly
- Founder: Jon Swinstead and Adam Dewhurst
- Founded: 1996
- Final issue: 2003
- Company: Swinstead Publishing
- Country: UK
- Based in: London
- Language: English
- ISSN: 1742-5506

Sleazenation was a monthly London based fashion, lifestyle and “'post-drug culture' magazine according to founding editor Steve Beale in 1999". The publication was co-founded by Jon Swinstead and Adam Dewhurst and published by Swinstead Publishing. It was given away for free to clubbers for one and a half years until its launch in 1996 as a high street magazine. It featured bands and artists ranging from underground acts such as Genesis P-Orridge to pop acts such as New Order.

"Founded as a free London club listings guide, it went on to enjoy an eight year reign as the world’s most anarchic, unpredictable fashion title, as likely to run a six-page feature on gout as it was a Gucci gatefold," wrote Jack Mills in a nostalgic 2015 Wonderland magazine feature. Supermodel Agyness Dean named Sleazenation as her teenage favourite in a 2010 Friday Night with Jonathan Ross appearance. Absolute Radio DJ and podcaster Dave Berry is also a vocal modern-day fan.

Like Dazed and Confused, Sleazenation is associated with the hipster regeneration of London's east end in the late 1990s. Writing about the magazine's influence in Resident Advisor during November 2021, reporter Harriet Shepherd observed, "looking back at it now Sleaze Nation is a historic record of the gentrification that has characterised London's cultural fabric—reported, almost unknowingly, in real-time." The early of home of many writers, designers, photographers and artists who would go on to achieve success, Sleaze Nation has also been celebrated in its modern-day contemporaries Wonderland and Show Studio. "Back then, the style media was a way into journalism for young talent from outside London. It was feasible then, but that door has totally closed. Who can just move into Hoxton Square on spec now?" founding editor Steve Beale told The Guardian during a 2015 article on east London TV pastiche Nathan Barley.

== Editorial and Photography ==
The founding 1996 editor was 22 year-old Steve Beale, who left in 1999 to work at EMAP on The Face and Arena after editorial director Ashley Heath read his article on The Sekhmet Hypothesis. The magazine's obscure title was taken from a tongue-in-cheek club night Beale threw at university. The magazine was an early champion of influential photographers including Ewen Spencer, Alasdair Mclellan, Adam Broomberg and Oliver Chanarin, and Jonathan de Villiers, particularly through the black and white, documentary-style photography of nightlife accompanying the famously outspoken club listings guide. Beale employed future urban art dealer Steve Lazarides as picture editor, where he would meet Banksy who soon also worked sporadically from the office, also producing covers and illustrations for the magazine. The artist Alexander de Cadenet was the Arts Editor from 1997 to 1999 and featured a series of interviews with significant visual artists of the time.

Subsequent editors were Stuart Turnbull, Steve Slocombe, and Neil Boorman. The magazine struggled to match the energy of its 90s heyday and closed at the end of 2003. It was relaunched shortly afterwards as "Sleaze" magazine.

During its tenure Sleazenation worked with a number of well-known art directors such as Stephen Male (who helped mould the face of i-D magazine in the 1980s), Nick Booth, Guerilla 6, Patrick Duffy and Richard Hart although it is Scott King's time at the magazine which helped solidify the magazine in many people's minds. During his tenure the magazine adopted the slogan, "An ideal for living through fashion, art, music and design".

Scott King's "Cher Guevara" cover from the February 2001 issue won several magazine awards and was featured in the Barbican exhibition 'Communicate: Independent British Graphic Design since the Sixties'. He also contributed cover headlines such as "Now even more superficial/Over 100 pages of hype & lies" and "Absolute sell out". Other artists included Banksy who contributed to the July issue of 2000.
The re-invigorated 'Sleaze' came under the art direction of Richard Hart but only lasted 4 issues before being closed down. The former editor Neil Boorman and former music editor Stuart Turnbull went on to run free London bi-monthly magazine 'Good for Nothing' which ran for 8 issues before closing around the end of 2005.

Sleazenation had an attendant picture library, PYMCA (Photographic Youth Music & Culture Archive). This was overseen by Steve Lazarides, who would go on to manage Banksy.

Sleazenation was featured in Print! Tearing it Up at Somerset House, London in 2018.
