= Jason Evans (photographer) =

British photographer

Jason Evans (born Holyhead, 1968) is a photographer and lecturer on photography. His best known work is Strictly, a series of portraits of young black men dressed as "country gents" made in collaboration with stylist Simon Foxton, and which were acquired for the permanent collection of the Tate Gallery, in 2004.

== Life and work ==
Jason Evans was born in Holyhead, Wales, in 1968. He was a senior lecturer on the Photography for Fashion and Advertising degree course at Newport School of Art, Media and Design, South Wales and currently lectures in photography at University for the Creative Arts in Farnham, England. Evans is based in Thanet, England.

Characterizing his photo-series Strictly, Evans said: "Strictly was a weird mixture of macho clothes and quite effeminate clothes. Sportswear-based but classical English things, turned around. The syntax of clothes was completely upside down, and then, worn by black people, it was a new vision of Britain. We were trying to break down stereotypes." The series first appeared in the British fashion monthly i-D in 1991.

In 2013, he was artist-in-residence at the Art Gallery of Ontario.

== Publications ==
=== Publications by Evans ===
- Reconciliation. Self-published, 2008. For Permanent Gallery.
- London, Colney. Self-published, 2011. Arsenal AH+.
- Sunday Supplement. Self-published, 2011. For Caribou ATP.
- NYLPT. London: Mack, 2012. ISBN 9781907946295.

=== Publications with contributions by Evans ===
- Look at Me. London: British Council, 1998. Edited by Val Williams and Brett Rogers.
- W'Happen. London: Shoreditch Biennale, 1998. ISBN 0-9533199-1-1. Edited by Evans and with work by Elaine Constantine, Corinne Day, Nick Knight, Marc Lebon, Craig McDean, Nigel Shafran, David Sims and Wolfgang Tillmans.
- Design Noir. August/Birkhauser, 2001. Dunne & Raby.
- Smile i-D. Taschen, 2001. Edited by Terry Jones.
- The Fashion Book. London: Phaidon, 2001. Colin McDowell.
- Art Crazy Nation. London: 21 Publishing, 2001. Mathew Collings.
- Century City. London: Tate, 2001. Edited by Iwona Blazwick.
- English Style Photography. Oxford: Berg, 2002. Penny Martin.
- Porn?. London: Vision On, 2002. Edited by Mark Irving, design by Tom Hingston. ISBN 978-0953747979.
- Where is Silas?. London: Laurence King, 2003. Andy Holmes, Sofia Prantera, Ben Sansbury and Russell Waterman. ISBN 978-1856693707.
- Fashion. Oxford: Oxford University, 2003. Christopher Breward.
- Art and Photography. London: Phaidon, 2003. Edited by David Campany.
- The London Look. London: Museum of London, 2004. Edited by Christopher Breward, Edwina Ehrman and Caroline Evans.
- The Photograph as Contemporary Art. London: Thames & Hudson, 2004. Charlotte Cotton. The work of nearly 250 photographers is reproduced, including that by Evans.
- Beyond Desire. Antwerp: ModeMuseum Provincie Antwerpen, 2005. Kaat Debo.
- The New English Dandy. London: Thames & Hudson, 2005. Alice Cicolini.
- Safe, design takes on new risks. New York: Museum of Modern Art, 2005. Paolo Antonelli.
- How We Are. London: Tate, 2007. Edited by Val Williams and Susan Bright.
- Distance. Tokyo: Infas, 2007. Edited by Koji Yoshida.
- Modern Menswear. London: Laurence King, 2008. Edited by Hywel Davies. ISBN 978 1 85669 540 4.
- Anna Fox. Brighton: Photoworks, 2008. Edited by Val Williams. Evans contributes an essay.

== Mobile app ==
- NYLPT. London: Mapp, 2012. Photographs and soundtrack. Mobile app for iPad and iPhone.

== Exhibitions ==
- Nothing is in the Place, Krakow Photomonth festival, Kraków, 4 – 31 May 2010.

== Collection ==
Evans' work is held in the following public collection:

- Tate, London.
