= Lua Ribeira =

UK-based Spanish photographer

- Born: 1986 (age 39–40); Galicia
- Education: University of South Wales
- Known for: Photography
- Notable work: Noises
- Website: luaribeira.com/About

Lua Ribeira (born 1986) is a Galician photographer, based in Bristol in the UK. She is interested in "using the photographic medium as a means to create encounters that establish relationships and question structural separations between people." She is a Nominee member of Magnum Photos and was joint winner of the Jerwood/Photoworks Award in 2017. Her series Noises is about femininity and British dancehall culture.

== Life and work ==
Ribeira, originally from Galicia Spain, currently lives and works in the UK. She initially studied media and graphic design, earning a degree from the BAU School of Design in Barcelona, before deciding to become a photographer.

In 2016, she graduated from the University of South Wales with a first-class honors BA in Documentary Photography. Since graduating, she has been a guest lecturer at the University of Westminster, University of the West of England, and Complutense University of Madrid.

In 2015, she was awarded the Firecracker Photographic Grant for her project Noises in the Blood (also known as Noises). Produced between 2015 and 2019, it is inspired by Jamaican dancehall culture in the UK. The title is a reference to the book Noises in the Blood: Orality, Gender, and the”Vulgar” Body of Jamaican Popular Culture by author and literary scholar Dr. Carolyn Cooper.

She joined Magnum Photos as a Nominee in 2018.

== Publications ==
=== Publications by Ribeira ===
- Noises in the Blood. London: Fishbar, 2017. Edition of 500 copies.

=== Publications with contributions by Ribeira ===
- Raw View Magazine, “Women looking at Women” curated by Susan Meiselas, 2016.
- Firecrackers: Female Photographers Now. London: Thames & Hudson, 2017. By Fiona Rogers and Max Houghton. ISBN 978-0500544747.

== Awards ==
- 2015: Firecracker Photographic Grant for Women in Photography
- 2015: Reginald Salisbury Fund (USW)
- 2017: Magnum Graduate Photographers Award, Magnum Photos
- 2018: Joint winner, Jerwood/Photoworks Awards, with Sam Laughlin and Alejandra Carles-Tolra

== Exhibitions ==
=== Solo exhibitions ===
- Noises in the Blood, Kickplate Gallery, Abertillery, Wales, 2016; Fotoraum Gallery, Art Cologne, Germany, 2016; Fishbar Gallery, London, May 2017; Grain Photography Hub, Argentea Gallery, Birmingham, March–May 2018; Noises, Ffotogallery, Cardiff, Wales, January–February 2019

=== Group exhibitions ===
- Jerwood/Photoworks Award winners, Jerwood Space, London, January–March 2018; Impressions Gallery, Bradford, April–June 2018. Subida al Cielo (Ascent into Heaven) by Ribeira, Where We Belong by Alejandra Carles-Tolra, and A Certain Movement by Sam Laughlin.
- Close Enough: New Perspectives from 12 Contemporary Women of Magnum, International Center of Photography, September 2022 - January 2023.
