= Maria Jastrzębska =

Polish-British writer

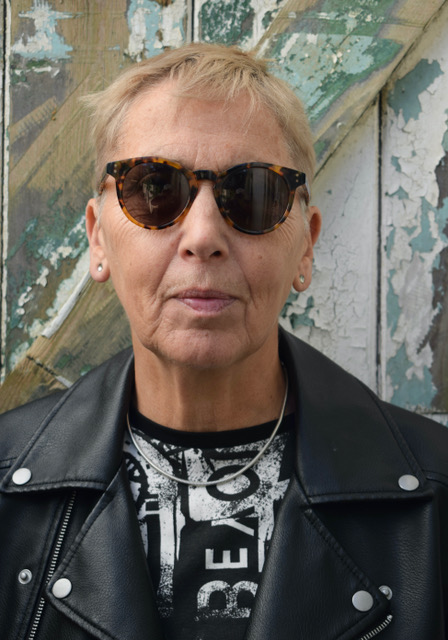
- Maria Jastrzebska
- Born: 28 March 1953 (age 73); Warsaw, Poland
- Occupations: Poet and teacher

Maria Jastrzębska (born 28 March 1953) is a Polish-British poet, feminist, editor, translator and playwright. She has published five full-length volumes of poetry, two pamphlets and a play. She regularly contributes to a wide range of national and international journals and anthologies.

== Early life and education ==
Maria Jastrzębska was born in Warsaw and moved to the United Kingdom as a young child. She went to Ealing Grammar School for Girls, and the Lycée Français Charles de Gaulle, both in London. She later studied Developmental Psychology at the University of Sussex.

She has taught communication in further education and also creative writing in adult education.

== Literary career ==
Jastrzębska has been writing since she was very young; her first book, created before she could write, was entitled My Book and was filled with squiggles. As a young adult, she began contributing to a range of feminist journals, including Spare Rib, Writing Women and Spinster.

She continues to engage in community projects, literary festivals and residencies.

== Personal life ==
She lives with her partner in Brighton.

== Works and themes ==
Jastrzębska's fourth full-length collection The True Story of Cowboy Hat and Ingénue was published by Cinnamon Press A review by David Caddy in Tears in the Fence said of this collection "The range of voices and languages, the various narratives all succinctly described, are all impressive and produce an exhilarating read". Of Cedry z Walpole Park, Eliza Szybowicz writes "This poet’s coat of arms has a wolf on it. Her language sniffs out, tracks, rips flesh, fights, sometimes chooses escape, parties madly, desires. Don’t you wish you were in her pack!". Her fifth full-length collection Small Odysseys was published by Waterloo Press in October 2022.

She is the co-founder of Queer Writing South and South Pole and co-edited Queer in Brighton (New Writing South 2014) with Anthony Luvera. Her poetry features in the British Library project Poetry Between Two Worlds and her drama Dementia Diaries which toured nationally to sell-out audiences was described as "like a piece of chamber music, and transcends ... the literalness of language".

She has also worked with two other Polish-connected artists, fine artist Dagmara Rudkin and composer Peter Copley along with director Mark H Hewitt and artist Wendy Pye to collaborate on a project inspired by The Snow Queen story by Hans Christian Andersen. Following research and development grants from the Arts Council England they worked together to produce a multi-media installation in the Regency Town House, Brighton, the production then toured with five performances in Portsmouth, Lewes, Birmingham and Lambeth, London. Jastrzębska’s poems were written in the voices of Crow, a multilingual, timeless trickster, migrant and crone, and Gerda and Kai two young, non-binary identifying young people. The poems include ‘Ponglish’ – a hybrid language of Polish and English. A triptych of filmpoems of Maria Jastrzębska’s work was made by Wendy Pye and screened internationally.

Jastrzębska's work focuses on borders and boundaries: between countries, cultures and languages, between social and sexual identities, health and illness. Her experience of arriving in the UK from Poland as a child, with having to adapt to a different language, culture and society, has informed all her written work. Poet and fellow ‘exile’ George Szirtes says her "poems open out like adventures in a dual land that is both here and elsewhere".

== Publications ==
=== Full-length collections ===
- Syrena (2004), Redbeck Press, ISBN 978-8373893054
- Everyday Angels, Waterloo Press, (2009) ISBN 978-1906742102
- At the Library of Memories, Waterloo Press, (2014) ISBN 978-1-906742-57-7
- The True Story of Cowboy Hat and Ingénue, Cinnamon Press, (2018) ISBN 978-1-911540-03-8
- Small Odysseys, Waterloo Press, (October 2022) ISBN 978-1-915241-05-4

=== Pamphlets ===
- Home from Home (2002) ISBN 978-1900397575
- I'll be Back Before You Know it (2008) ISBN 978-1906309060

=== Plays ===
- Dementia Diaries (2011)

=== Anthologies ===
- The New British Poetry, Paladin, (1988) ISBN 9780586087657
- Naming the Waves, Contemporary Lesbian Poetry, Virago Press, (1988) ISBN 978 0 8606 8852 5
- The Virago Book of Wicked Verse, Virago (1992) ISBN 1853813877
- Parents, Enitharmon (2000) ISBN 9781900564717
- See How I Land – Oxford Poets & Refugees, Heaven Tree Press (2009) ISBN 9781906038380
- This Line Is Not For Turning, Cinnamon Press (2011) ISBN 9781907090516
- This Assignment Is So Gay, Sibling Rivalry Press, USA, (2013) ISBN 978 1 937420420
- Images of Women: An Anthology of Contemporary Women's Poetry, Arrowhead Press (2013) ISBN 978 1 9048 5214 8
- Hallelujah for 50ft Women, Bloodaxe (2015) ISBN 978 1 78037 1559
- Songs for the Unsung, Grey Hen Press (2017) ISBN 978 0 9933756 4 4
- Wretched Strangers, Boiler House Press (2018) ISBN 978-1911343387
- Resistance: Voices of Exiled Writers, Palewell Press (2020) ISBN 978 1 9115 8746 0
- Poetki na czasy zarazy, WBPiCAK (2021) ISBN 978 83 66453 72 2
- Ukraine in the Work of International Poets, Literary Waves Publishing (2022) ISBN 978 1 4583 5727 4

=== Collaborations ===
- Postcards from Poland and Other Correspondences (1990) with artist Jola Scicińska ISBN 978-1870736060
- Snow Q cross-arts project and installation at Regency Town House (2018)
- Snow Q live literature performances (2020)
- Snow Q filmpoems with Wendy Pye: Crow, Have You Seen Kai, Lullaby (2020)

=== Translated works ===
- Cedry z Walpole Park (2015) with Anna Blasiak, Pawel Gawroński and Wioletta Grzegorzewska ISBN 978-8361381945
- Cutite vechi (2017) trans. Lidia Vianu ISBN 978 606 8782 59-1

=== Translations ===
- Elsewhere, Iztok Osojnik, (with Ana Jeinikar) 2011 ISBN 9781906309091
- The Great Plan B, Justyna Bargielska 2017, Smokestack Press ISBN 978 0 9957675 4 6

=== Edited works ===
- Whoosh! A Queer Writing South Anthology (with John McCullough) ISBN 978-1-906309-05-3
- Different and Beautiful. An Anthology of Writing by LGBT young people from Allsorts Youth Project ISBN 0 9541554 83
- Queer in Brighton (2014, with Anthony Luvera) ISBN 978 0 9928260-0-0
