= Billy Meier =

Swiss UFO religion founder (born 1937)

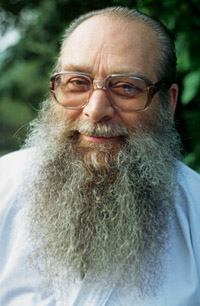
- Born: Eduard Albert Meier; 3 February 1937 (age 89); Bülach in the Zürcher Unterland, Switzerland
- Occupations: Author, ufologist
- Organization(s): Freie Interessengemeinschaft für Grenz- und Geisteswissenschaften und Ufologiestudien (Free Community of Interests for the Border and Spiritual Sciences and Ufological Studies) (FIGU)
- Known for: Contactee/UFO religion
- Children: 4
- Website: www.figu.org

Eduard Albert Meier (born 3 February 1937), commonly nicknamed "Billy", is the founder of a UFO religion called the "Freie Interessengemeinschaft für Grenz- und Geisteswissenschaften und Ufologiestudien" (Free Community of Interests for the Border and Spiritual Sciences and Ufological Studies) and alleged contactee whose UFO photographs are claimed to show alien spacecraft. Meier claims to be in regular contact with extraterrestrial beings he calls the Plejaren. He also presented other material during the 1970s such as metal samples, sound recordings and film footage. Meier claims to be the seventh reincarnation after six prophets common to Judaism, Christianity, and Islam: Enoch, Elijah, Isaiah, Jeremiah, Immanuel (Jesus), and Muhammad.

Meier has been widely characterized as a fraud by skeptics and ufologists, who suggest that he used models to hoax photos claimed to show alien spacecraft. Meier's prophecies repeatedly blame Jews (whom he refers to as "gypsies") for future atrocities.

== Background ==
Meier was born in the town of Bülach in the Zürcher Unterland. Meier left public schools before finishing 6th grade. In his teens he was convicted multiple times of minor offenses. In 1953, he was convicted of thievery and forgery and sentenced to a prison term in Rheinau. After escaping from the facility, Meier illegally crossed the border and joined the French Foreign Legion. He went AWOL from the Legion to return home. In 1965, he lost his left arm in a bus accident in Turkey. Some time later, he met and married a Greek woman, Kalliope Zafiriou, with whom he had three children. The nickname "Billy" came by way of an American friend who thought Meier's cowboy style of dress reminded her of Billy the Kid.

== Alleged extraterrestrial contacts ==
Meier claims his extraterrestrial encounters began in 1942, at the age of five, when he met an elderly Plejaren man named Sfath. After Sfath's death in 1953, Meier said, he began communicating with an extraterrestrial woman (though not a Plejaren), Asket. He said all contact ceased in 1964, then resumed on January 28, 1975, when he met Semjase, the granddaughter of Sfath, and shortly thereafter another Plejaren man, Ptaah. Other extraterrestrials have since allegedly joined the dialog as well.

Meier founded Freie Interessengemeinschaft für Grenz- und Geisteswissenschaften und Ufologiestudien ("Free Community of Interests for the Border and Spiritual Sciences and Ufological Studies"), a non-profit organization based on his alleged contacts with Semjase, in the late 1970s and established his Semjase Silver Star Center. The organization's headquarters is in Switzerland.

== Photographs, films ==
One of Meier's photographs of "a beamship floating beside a tree".

Meier's photographs and films are claimed by him to show alien spacecraft floating above the Swiss countryside. He calls the alleged spaceships "beamships" from Plejaren. According to Meier, the Plejaren gave him permission to photograph and film their beamships so that he could produce evidence of their extraterrestrial visitations. Some of Meier's photos are claimed by him to show prehistoric Earth scenes, extraterrestrials, and celestial objects from an alleged non-Earthly vantage point. Meier's claims are widely characterized as fraudulent by scientists, skeptics, and most ufologists, who say that his photographs and films are hoaxes. In interviews with author Gary Kinder, Meier admitted to using models to recreate scenes after his wife showed photos of incomplete models he thought he had destroyed by burning. During a 2017 art exhibit about conspiracies, many of Meier's photographs were shown. Photography curator Gordon MacDonald commented on examinations from the 1970s that the photos weren't doctored saying "Just because photographs are real – ie real images made with a real camera – doesn't mean they are of what the person says they're of." One of Meier's photographs is notable for being the background of the "I want to believe" poster in The X-Files before an intellectual property lawsuit forced producers to change the poster background to a different photo in the fourth season of the series.

In 1997, Meier's ex-wife, Kalliope, told interviewers that his photos were of spaceship models he crafted with items like trash can lids, carpet tacks and other household objects, and that the stories he told of his adventures with the aliens were similarly fictitious. She also said that photos of purported extraterrestrial women "Asket" and "Nera" were really photos of Michelle DellaFave and Susan Lund, members of the singing and dancing troupe The Golddiggers. It was later confirmed that the women in the photographs were members of The Golddiggers performing on The Dean Martin Show.

== Media ==
Billy Meier’s claims were the subject of Contact, a 1987 hagiography written and directed by Larry Savadove that presents his story solely through Meier and his supporters, without including skeptical viewpoints. The film is narrated by David Warner, featuring Meier's apologetics Lee Elders and Wendelle Stevens.

== See also ==
- List of alleged extraterrestrial beings
