= Hywel Davies (journalist) =

Hywel Davies

Hywel Davies is a freelance fashion writer and journalist based in London.

Previously the fashion editor at iconic lifestyle magazine Sleazenation, he has also written for Arena, Vogue, ELLE, Wallpaper, Nylon, Dazed and Confused, Dansk, Self Service, Fashion Inc, Grafik, Time Out, The Guardian, The Sunday Telegraph, The Financial Times, The Observer, The Independent and SHOWstudio.

He is the author of Modern Menswear, 100 New Fashion Designers and British Fashion Designers all published by Laurence King Publishing.

He is the programme director for BA(Hons) Fashion programme and the course leader of BA(Hons) Fashion Communication and Promotion at Central Saint Martins.
