= Bettina von Zwehl =

German artist

Bettina von Zwehl (born 1971) is a German artist who lives and works in London. She has centred her artistic practice on photography, installation and archival exploration evolving through artist-residencies in museums. Her work explores representations of the human condition and human concerns through an observational approach combined with a distinctive use of the profile view and silhouette that continues to underpin her practice.

== Career ==
Von Zwehl was born in Munich and studied in London, receiving a BA in Photography from the London College of Printing and an MA in Fine Art Photography from the Royal College of Art, London.

She began making portraits as a student at the Royal College of Art, using a 19th-century methodology that she encountered as a photographer's assistant in Rome, working on 10 in × 8 in (250 mm × 200 mm) film with a large-plate camera. Most of her work has been in the studio. Reviews of her early work often commented on its conceptual framing and the depiction of subjects in unusual physical or emotional circumstances, with an increased degree of vulnerability. At the same time, she has also been interested in profile photography. Citing the influence of Renaissance painting, she calls the profile portrait "one of the most powerful ways of representing a person."

In 2010 she was commissioned to take a series of outdoor portraits of athletes and paralympians preparing for the 2012 London Olympics. Recently she has been invited to create works in reaction to the collections of several museums, including the Victoria & Albert Museum (V&A), the Holburne Museum and the Freud Museum. In 2014 she collaborated with her friend and fellow artist Sophy Rickett on a project reacting to an album from the Sir Benjamin Stone Archive at the Library of Birmingham.

She was artist in residence for 6 months in 2011 at the V&A (2011) and artist in residence for 5 months in 2013–2014 at the Freud Museum, where she created a permanent installation for the Anna Freud Room in response to the life and legacy of Anna Freud. Made up Love Song (2011) is the result of the residency at the Victoria & Albert Museum. Von Zwehl explored the collection of portrait miniatures at the museum, creating a durational portrait in miniature in 34 parts of Sophia Birikorang, a member of the visitor experience team at the V&A.

In 2013/14 she did a residency for The Freud Museum London producing permanent work for the Anna Freud Room in the museum. Following her residency at the museum she had a solo show Invitation to frequent the Shadows’ in 2016. The publication Lament was published to coincide with the exhibition and co-authored by Josh Cohen.

In 2018 von Zwehl was invited to be the first artist-in-residence at the New-York Historical Society. She received a grant from the Pollock-Krasner Foundation in 2017 and in 2018 she spent 6 weeks in New-York researching the collections and making new work: Meditations in an Emergency (2018), a photographic series inspired by the teen protests following the tragedy at Stoneman Douglas High School on Valentine's Day 2018, and the collections of portrait silhouettes at the N-YHSM.

Wunderkammer (2020), is a site-specific photography and mixed-media installation in response to a year long research period at the Renaissance Kunst- und Wunderkammer (Chamber of Art and Wonders) of Ferdinand II at Castle Ambras in Innsbruck Austria.

In 2024 von Zwehl received an RPS (The Royal Photographic Society) award for Achievement in the Art of Photography.

== Publications ==
=== Monographs ===
- Bettina von Zwehl. Göttingen: Steidl / Brighton: Photoworks, 2007. With an essay by Darian Leader and interview with Charlotte Cotton. ISBN 978-3865212887.
- Made Up Love Song. London: V&A, 2014. With an essay by David Chandler. ISBN 978-1851778225.
- Lament. London: Art/Books, 2016. A collaboration with psychoanalyst and writer Josh Cohen. ISBN 978-1-908970-27-5.
- Wunderkammer. Salzburg: Fotohof, 2020. With an essay by Ciara Ennis. ISBN 978-3-903334-01-4.

=== Anthologies and group exhibition catalogues ===
- The Photograph as Contemporary Art. Thames & Hudson, 2004. ISBN 978-0500204016.
- The Portrait Now. New Haven, CA: Yale University Press, 2006. ISBN 978-0300115246.
- Vitamin Ph: New Perspectives in Photography. London: Phaidon, 2006. ISBN 978-0714846569.
- The Body in Contemporary Art. London: Thames & Hudson, 2009. ASIN B00C6OOPIQ.
- Road to 2012. London: National Portrait Gallery, 2012. ISBN 978-1855144347.
- 21st Century Portraits. London: National Portrait Gallery, 2013. ISBN 978-1855144163.

== Exhibitions ==
=== Solo exhibitions ===
- An Anatomy of Control, Lombard-Freid Fine Arts, New York (2000)
- Victoria Miro Gallery, The Project Space, London (2002)
- Lombard-Freid Fine Arts, New York (2004)
- The Photographers' Gallery, London (2005)
- Profiles III, Victoria & Albert Museum of Childhood, London (2009)
- Road to 2012, Setting Out, Commissioned by the National Portrait Gallery, London (2010)
- Made up Love Song, Purdy Hicks Gallery, London (2011)
- Ruby’s Room, Holburne Museum of Art, Bath (2013)
- Laments and Sospiri, Purdy Hicks Gallery, London (2014)
- Album 31 (collaboration with Sophy Rickett), Fotogaleriet, Oslo, Norway (2015)
- Invitation to Frequent the Shadows, The Freud Museum, London (2016)
- Meditations in an Emergency, New-York Historical Society Museum, NYC, USA (2018)
- Wunderkammer, BTV Stadtforum Innsbruck, Austria (2020)

=== Group exhibitions ===
- Fiction, Timothy Taylor Gallery, London (2004)
- Photography 2005, Victoria Miro Gallery, London (2005)
- In Repose, The Galleries at Moore, Moore College of Art and Design, Philadelphia (2008)
- Baby, Picturing the Ideal Human, National Media Museum, Bradford (2009)
- Another Face: Works from the Arts Council Collection, Hatton Gallery, Newcastle upon Tyupon Tyne (2011)
- Seduced by Art: Photography Past and Present, National Gallery, London (2012)
- 3am: Wonder, Paranoia and the restless Night, Bluecoat Chambers, Liverpool (2013)
- Facing History: Contemporary Portraiture, Victoria and Albert Museum, London (2015–2016)

== Collections ==
Von Zwehl's work is held in the following public collections:

- Victoria and Albert Museum, London
- Solomon R. Guggenheim Museum
