= Roger Eberhard =

Swiss photographer

Roger Eberhard (born 28 April 1984) is a Swiss photographer. He lives and works in Berlin and Zürich.

== Life and career ==
Roger Eberhard was born in Zürich and grew up in Birmensdorf. He moved to Vancouver in 2003, and to Santa Barbara, California in 2005 where he studied at the Brooks Institute of Photography. Eberhard won the EWZ Swiss Photo Award in 2009 for his series So Long, Cockaigne.

In 2016 Swiss publishing house Scheidegger & Spiess published Eberhard’s book Standard, for which he photographed the Hilton Hotels Standard room and the view from it in 32 different countries. The Washington Post called it a journey of the deja-vu. Author Benedict Wells contributed an essay about the monotony and melancholy of hotels to the book. Other books by Roger Eberhard include Wilted Country, In Good Light, Tumulus and Norma.

In 2012 Roger Eberhard founded the publishing house b.frank books. Together with Swiss artist Ester Vonplon, they publish 2-4 books per year. Amongst other artists, b.frank books has released books by Saâdane Afif, Will Steacy und Jenny Rova.

== Publications ==
- 2008, Callas, Modernbook Editions, ISBN 978-0-977882-89-2
- 2009, Und in der Nähe die See, mit Ester Vonplon, im Eigenverlag
- 2010, Wilted Country, Scheidegger & Spiess, Zürich ISBN 978-3-85881-306-0
- 2011, In Good Light, Scheidegger & Spiess, Zürich ISBN 978-3-85881-328-2
- 2012, Tumulus, mit James Nizam, Peperoni Books, Berlin ISBN 978-3-941825-30-7
- 2013, Norma, Peperoni Books, Berlin, ISBN 978-3-941825-47-5
- 2016, Standard, Scheidegger & Spiess, Zürich, ISBN 978-3-85881-528-6
- 2020, Human Territoriality, Edition Patrick Frey, Zürich, ISBN 978-3-907236-00-0
