= Belfast Exposed =

Photography gallery

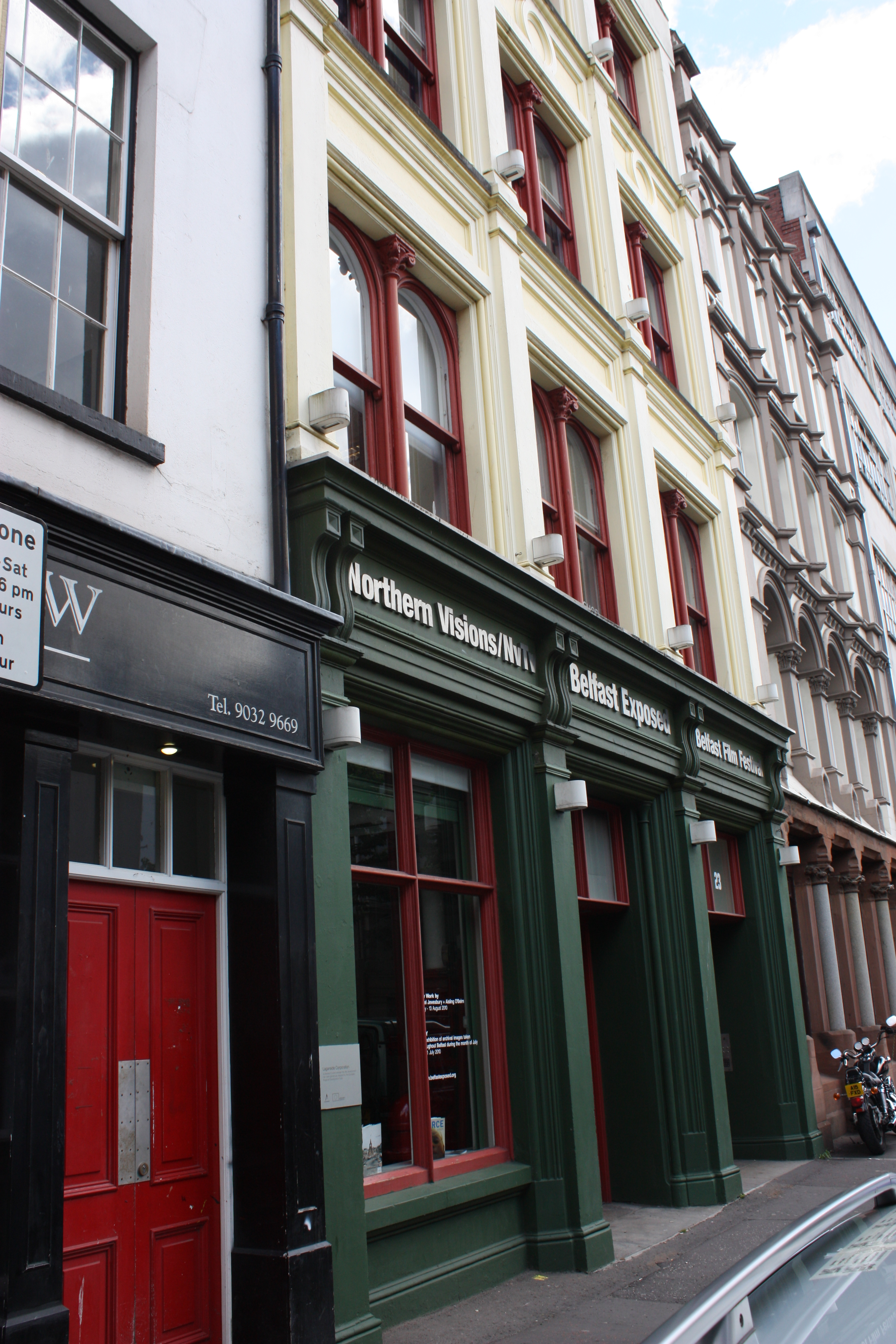
- Belfast Exposed in 2010
- Established: 1983
- Location: 23 Donegall Street, Belfast BT1 2FF
- Coordinates: 54.601°N 5.928°W
- Type: Independent
- Website: www.belfastexposed.org

Belfast Exposed is an independent photography gallery in Belfast, Northern Ireland that was established in 1983.

== Details ==
Belfast Exposed houses a 20×7 m gallery for the exhibition of contemporary photography, digital archive browsing facilities, a spacious black and white photographic darkroom and a digital editing suite in its Donegall Street premises.

It was Northern Ireland's first dedicated photographic gallery and in 2018 Sean O'Hagan in The Guardian described it as "the key independent space for contemporary photography" there. It was established "to challenge and subvert media representations of the Troubles-torn city". The gallery has focused on the production of socially and politically engaged work, and the development and exhibition of community photography. Training is used to encourage local communities to use photography to record and understand their environment.

Belfast Exposed hosts an archive of half a million images, which were to be published online in a digital archive by March 2004.

The gallery is used as a venue during both the Belfast Film Festival and the Belfast Festival at Queen's.
