= Christopher Stewart (artist) =

British photographer (born 1966)

- Born: 1966 (age 59–60); London
- Occupations: Visual artist, educator

Christopher Stewart (born 1966 in London) is a visual artist working with photography and moving image.

== Career ==
Stewart studied at the Royal College of Art in London (MA RCA) and gained a PhD from the University of New South Wales Art & Design in Sydney. He is represented by Gimpel Fils. His work has shown at the National Museum of Photography, Film and Television in Bradford, the Victoria and Albert Museum, the Fotomuseum Winterthur in Switzerland, The Sainsbury Centre Art Gallery and Museum Norwich and the Whitechapel Gallery in London as well as other international venues.

== Art ==
Stewart's work is concerned with ideas of rehearsal and violence, hierarchies of vision and surveillance. From the 1990s he has examined the global phenomenon of privatised global security – using this modern hyper-industry as a metaphor for analysing global insecurity. Subsequent projects from the mid-2000s have included Kill House, an analysis of US based disciplinary vernacular structures used for the training of private special-forces prior to deployment to Iraq and Afghanistan, Super Border, photographs taken along the route of the newly opened 300 million euro External Integrated Vigilance System on the southern Andalucian coast in Spain, The Colony, that looks at the displacement of natural fauna against a military build-up in the Pacific region and Bird Watching in Norfolk (or the sound of war) that places images of US Airforce activity in East-Anglia alongside images of the natural world, primarily birdlife.

=== Publications and catalogues ===
Stewart's work is included in surveys including The Photograph as Contemporary Art, Thames & Hudson World of Art Series edited by Charlotte Cotton, Darkside II, Fotomuseum Winterthur/Steidl edited by Urs Stahel, 100 European Photographers, EXIT Madrid edited by Rosa Olivares, Langford's Basic Photography Ninth Edition, Focal Press, and The Critical Dictionary, Black Dog Publishing, edited by David Evans.

== Curating and writing ==
Stewart curated the group exhibition Staging Disorder with Esther Teichmann in 2015 for University of the Arts London which included the work of An-My Lê, Richard Mosse, Broomberg and Chanarin, Sarah Pickering, Claudio Hils and Geissler/Sann. The exhibition was accompanied by a publication with essays by David Campany, Howard Caygill, Alexandra Stara, Adam Jasper, Esther Teichmann and Christopher Stewart; Private at the Hockney Gallery whilst a student at the Royal College of Art in 1997 which included the work of Clare Strand and Maggie Lambert; Infraliminal at Stills Gallery for the Edinburgh Fringe in 2001 which was reviewed in The Guardian and included the work of Rut Blees Luxemburg, Sophy Rickett and Juan Delgado.

He has curated and written exhibition introductions for a number of shows for university galleries including Edition, an exhibition of sixty prototype and dummy books at the University of Brighton during the Brighton Photo Biennial 2006. Catalogue essays include a commissioned from the Krackow International Photomonth Festival in Poland in 2010. The Festival's focus was on British Photography and included exhibitions by John Stezaker and Tony Ray Jones and the focus of Stewart's essay was an analysis of the last decade of British photography.

== Academic ==
Stewart has been a visiting part-time tutor at The New School of the Anthropocene in London - an innovative student centred entity pioneering a new model of higher education. Between 2016 and 2020 he was head of the academic area of photography (Programme Director of Photography) at London College of Communication, University of the Arts that encompassed five undergraduate and postgraduate courses in photography and from 2020 co-led the Wellcome Trust funded project Constellations (2020-2023) with Dr. Esther Teichmann (RCA) as well as maintaining a tutoring role on the long standing online MA in Photojournalism and Documentary Photography at London College of Communication, University of the Arts London. Previously he held the position of Associate Professor at both RMIT University and UTS University in Australia and Head of Photography at the National Art School in Sydney. From 2004 to 2008 he was Principal Lecturer and head of the academic area of Photography, Moving Image and Sound at the University of Brighton where he was also Program Director of the MA in Photography.
