= Round Prairie Township, Todd County, Minnesota =

Round Prairie Township, Minnesota
- Township
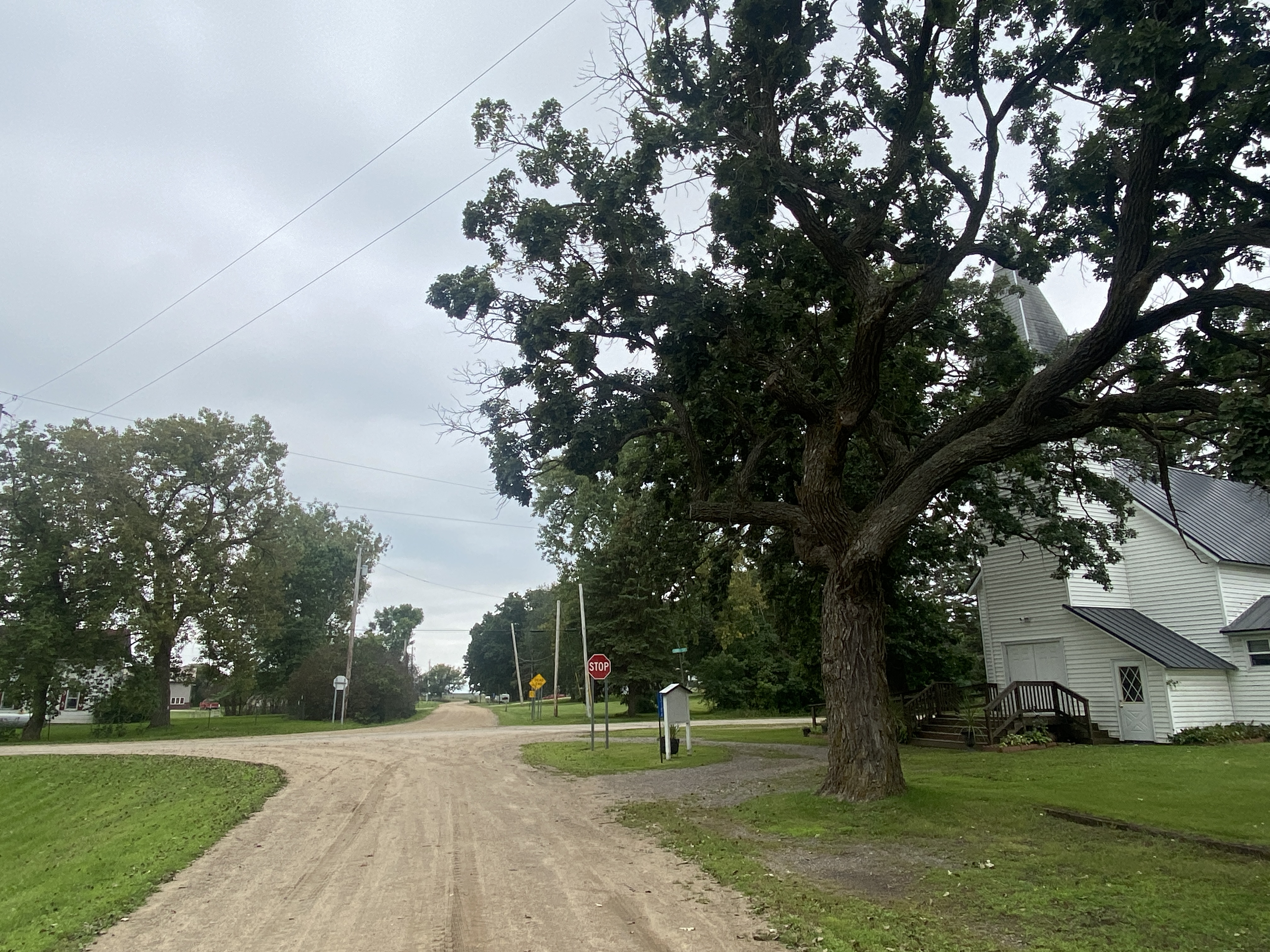
- Elderberry Drive and 190th Street

- Location within the state of Minnesota Round Prairie Township, Minnesota (the United States)
- Coordinates: 45°53′17″N 94°49′32″W
- Country: United States
- State: Minnesota
- County: Todd

Area
  - Total: 36.0 sq mi (93.3 km^{2})
  - Land: 35.1 sq mi (90.8 km^{2})
  - Water: 0.97 sq mi (2.5 km^{2})
- Elevation: 1,322 ft (403 m)

Population (2020)
  - Total: 714
  - Density: 20/sq mi (7.6/km^{2})
- Time zone: UTC-6 (Central (CST))
  - Summer (DST): UTC-5 (CDT)
- FIPS code: 27-56122
- GNIS feature ID: 0665481

Round Prairie Township is a township in Todd County, Minnesota, United States. The population was 692 at the 2000 census. By the 2020 census the population had increased to 714 residents.

Round Prairie Township was named for a large prairie within its borders. A village name Round Prairie is located in section 18. Round Prairie Village was platted in 1903 and had a post office from 1868 to 1963. It had a Great Northern Train Station.

== Geography ==
According to the United States Census Bureau, the township has a total area of 36.0 square miles (93.3 km^{2}), of which 35.1 square miles (90.8 km^{2}) is land and 1.0 square miles (2.5 km^{2}) (2.66%) is water.

=== Lakes ===
Lake Latimer is a 202-acre lake with a maximum depth of 30.5 feet located in the township. There is a public boat access to the lake in the northeast corner. There is a small lake to the southwest of Latimer, named Roundup by the Minnesota DNR, that has a tributary stream leading into Latimer.

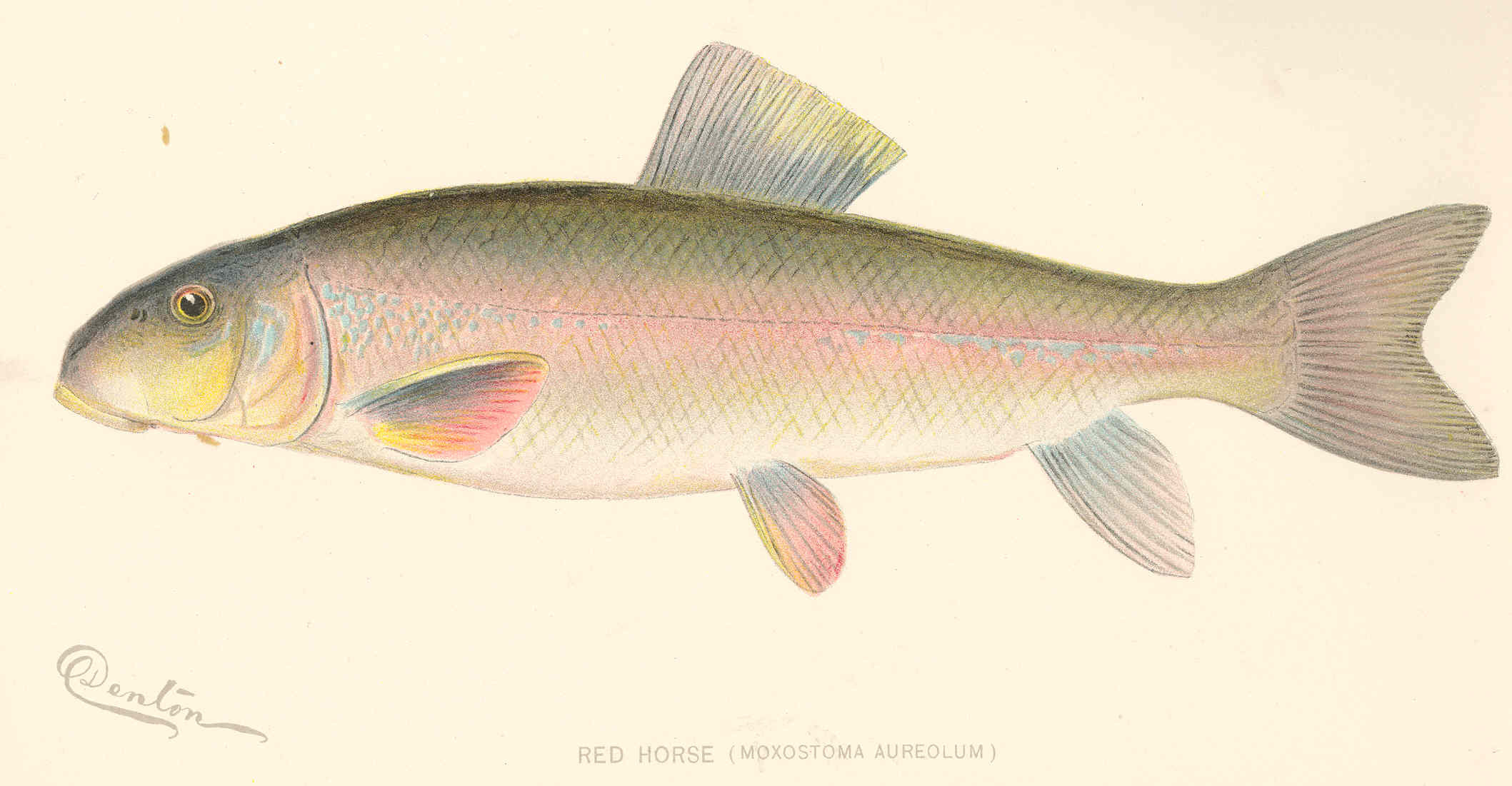
The Shorthead Redhorse is found in Lake Latimer

The fish species in the Lake include black bullhead, black crappie, bluegill, brown bullhead, green sunfish, hybrid sunfish, largemouth bass, northern pike, pumpkinseed, rock bass, walleye, yellow bullhead, yellow perch, shorthead redhorse, white sucker, central mudminnow, golden shiner, Johnny darter, and tadpole madtom.

Lasher Lake Wildlife Management Area, in Round Prairie Township, includes 146 acres of grassland, brush, and open water wetland. It is south of Long Prairie and is adjacent to U.S. highway 71. The Minnesota DNR says that White tail deer, pheasants, and a variety of waterfowl can be found on the WMA.

== Demographics ==
As of the census of 2000, there were 692 people, 230 households, and 181 families residing in the township. The population density was 19.7 people per square mile (7.6/km^{2}). There were 259 housing units at an average density of 7.4/sq mi (2.9/km^{2}). The racial makeup of the township was 99.13% White, and 0.87% from two or more races.

There were 230 households, out of which 40.0% had children under the age of 18 living with them, 70.9% were married couples living together, 3.9% had a female householder with no husband present, and 20.9% were non-families. 17.4% of all households were made up of individuals, and 5.2% had someone living alone who was 65 years of age or older. The average household size was 3.01 and the average family size was 3.45.

In the township the population was spread out, with 33.4% under the age of 18, 6.9% from 18 to 24, 27.7% from 25 to 44, 22.3% from 45 to 64, and 9.7% who were 65 years of age or older. The median age was 35 years. For every 100 females, there were 107.2 males. For every 100 females age 18 and over, there were 109.5 males.

The median income for a household in the township was $35,694, and the median income for a family was $38,750. Males had a median income of $25,741 versus $20,833 for females. The per capita income for the township was $13,422. About 16.0% of families and 17.2% of the population were below the poverty line, including 20.7% of those under age 18 and 26.6% of those age 65 or over.
