= Helen Sear =

British artist (born 1955)

Helen Sear RA (born 1955) is a British visual artist specialising in photography and moving image.

== Biography ==
Helen Sear was born in Banbury, England, in 1955 and grew up in the West Midlands. Her mother was a teacher and her father a maxillo-facial surgeon and she has two younger brothers.

She was introduced to the natural environment through regular family walks, during which her father shared his knowledge of plants and wildlife. This early exposure nurtured her connection with the natural world and shaped her enduring interest in visualizing and interpreting elements of the landscape as bodies inseparable from our own human forms (e.g., Anatomy of a Tree, Royal Academy, 2025).

Sear studied Fine Art at Reading University and University College London, and she studied at Slade School. In the late 1980s, she worked primarily through installation, performance, and film. Her photographic works were included in the 1991 British Council exhibition "De-Composition: Constructed Photography in Britain", which toured Latin America and Eastern Europe.

She was awarded a PhD by publication in 2009 at the University of Wales Newport titled Reconstructing Experience.

Sear was elected to the Royal Academy of Arts in March 2024.

== Career ==
Sear's work first came to prominence internationally through her participation in the British Council's 1991 touring exhibition De-Composition: Constructed Photography in Britain, which toured Eastern Europe and Latin America until 1998.

Her practice, rooted in Magic Realism, Surrealism, and Conceptual Art, frequently explores themes of vision, touch and relationships between figure and landscape.

She has exhibited widely in the UK and internationally, with notable solo shows in Copenhagen at Martin Asbæk Gallery, New York (Klompching Gallery in Brooklyn), Stuttgart, Eindhoven, and London at, both at the Anderson O’Day Gallery and Zelda Cheatle Gallery, where she developed a technique of making (non-contact) prints from 2 negatives that disrupted a conventional approach to portraiture, blurring the boundaries of both facial recognition and figure and ground.

=== Wales in Venice 2015 ===
In 2015, Helen Sear was selected as the first woman to represent Wales with a solo exhibition at the 56th Venice Biennale. Curated by Stuart Cameron and Ffotogallery and commissioned by the Arts Council of Wales, the exhibition, titled …the rest is smoke, was housed at Santa Maria Ausiliatrice in Venice.

== Artistic practice ==
Sear's work consistently blurs the boundaries between photography, and other Fine Art traditions, notably painting. She often manipulates images by layering, re-photographing, digitally drawing, and texturing surfaces. Her Becoming Forest series involved tracing lines of forest growth with a digital pen, juxtaposed with foresters’ fluorescent spray marks, highlighting both natural processes and human intervention.

Much of her recent work centers on rural Wales and France, where she examines landscapes as both sites of beauty and zones of control, production, and consumption. She has also drawn on her experience of moving through forests, collecting imagery over extended periods to produce highly crafted installations that require deep viewer engagement.

Sear’s video work wahaha biota was made during a year long Arts Council of England commission to work with the Forestry Commission England in Dalby Forest Yorkshire and with curator Stuart Cameron, then director of Crescent Arts Scarborough has been shown across the UK, Netherlands, and Switzerland (2018–2019).

== Personal life ==
Her studio is in Burgundy, France, where she lives. She is married to the Swiss painter Andreas Rüthi.

== Selected exhibitions ==
=== Solo exhibitions ===
- Gone to Earth, John Hansard Gallery, Southampton, 1994
- Twice... Once, Anderson O’Day London, 1998
- Zelda Cheatle Gallery, 2000

Inside The View, Klompching Gallery, New York, US, 2009

- Beyond The View', Klompching Gallery, New York, US, 2010
- Display, G39 Cardiff, 2009
- Beyond The View, Bildkultur, Stuttgart, 2012

Sightlines and Pastoral Monuments, Klompching Gallery, New York, US 2012

- Lure, Oriel Davies national touring exhibition, 2013
- Pastoral Monuments, Les Rencontres Internationales, Gaspésie Canada, 2014

Helen Sear, Klompchng Gallery, New York, US 2015

Helen Sear: New Work, Klompching Gallery, New York, US 2017

=== Group exhibitions ===
- British Council touring Exhibition De-Composition, constructed photography in Britain. 1991–1998
- Moments of Capture, Museum of Modern Art, Skopje, Macedonia
- A Quality of Light, Office of Art project, Tate Gallery, St. Ives, 1997
- Here to Stay, Arts Council of England purchases from the 1990s LaUSnne, Switzerland, 1998
- Je t’envisage, la disparition du portrait: Musée de L’Elysée,
- About Face, Hayward Gallery, London, 2004
- La Mirada Reflexiva, Espai D’Art Contemporani de Castellon, Spain, (with Robert Longo and Perejaume ), 2005
- Nothing Is In The Place, Kraków (Photo month), 2010
- We Have The Mirrors, We Have The Plans: Oriel Mostyn, Llandudno, Wales, 2010
- Paris Photo, Aperture Foundation New York, 2011
- Portmanteau, Halle 14 Leipzig, 2011
- Hijacked 111, Derby Quad, 2012
- New Perspectives: Landscape Art in Wales since the 1970s, National Museum Wales, 2012
- Royal Academy of Arts Summer Exhibition, London, 2014

== Publications ==
- Natural’s Not in It John Slyce Portfolio no. 35 (2002)
- Face. The New Photographic Portrait. Thames and Hudson (2006)
- Inside the View (2012)
- Brisées (2013)
