= Josh Cohen (psychoanalyst) =

British psychoanalyst and literature professor

Josh Cohen (born 1970) is a British psychoanalyst, academic and author. Between 1996 and 2024, he taught in the English department at Goldsmiths, University of London, where he was appointed Professor of Modern Literary Theory in 2010. He was elected to Membership of the British Psychoanalytical Society in 2009, and to Fellowship in 2014.

His essays have appeared in Granta, Aeon (magazine), The Yale Review and 1843 (magazine). He has written articles and reviews for The Guardian, The Times Literary Supplement, New Statesman and Prospect (magazine). He has published eight books and is a Fellow of the Royal Society of Literature.

== Critical reception ==
Reviews of Cohen’s books have been generally positive. His 2013 book The Private Life was praised for its writing and ideas by The Guardian, The Daily Telegraph and The Observer, while The Independent was more critical, considering it at times ‘dry and protracted’. Not Working (2019) received enthusiastic reviews from The Guardian, The New Statesman, Literary Review and The Financial Times, and a more mixed review from The Observer. How to Live. What to Do (2021) was very positively reviewed by the TLS and Kirkus Reviews, while Publishers Weekly felt its discussion of literature was weakened by its favouring ‘overwhelmingly white, western authors’.

== Works ==
- Spectacular Allegories: Postmodern American Writing and the Politics of Seeing (Pluto Press,1998, 9780745312071)
- Interrupting Auschwitz: Art, Religion, Philosophy, published by (Continuum, 2003, 9780826455512)
- How to Read Freud, (Granta, 2005, 9781862077638)
- The Private Life: Why We Remain in the Dark. (Granta, 2013, 9781847085290); American edition, The Private Life: Our Everyday Self in an Age of Intrusion (Counterpoint, 2014, 978161902497)
- Lament (with Bettina von Zwehl, accompanying text to artbook produced by von Zwehl for her Freud Museum exhibition) (Art/ Books, 2017, 9781908970275)
- Not Working: Why We Have to Stop (Granta, 2019, 9781783782062)
- How to Live. What to Do: In Search of Ourselves in Life an Literature (Ebury, 2021, 9781785039805)
- Losers (Peninsula, 2021, 9781999922344)
- All the Rage: Why Anger Drives the World (Granta, 2024, 9781783789450)
