= Sophie Ristelhueber =

French photographer

Sophie Ristelhueber (born 1949) is a French photographer. Her photographs concern the human impact of war. Ristelhueber has photographed extensively in the Balkans and Middle East. Her work has been exhibited at the Tate Modern and the National Gallery of Canada.

== Life and work ==
Ristelhueber was born in Paris, and currently resides there. Her work Fait examines the destruction wrought during the Gulf War. In March 2010 she won the Deutsche Börse Photography Prize, which was presented to her by film director Terry Gilliam.

Sophie Ristelhueber was awarded the Hasselblad Award in 2025
