= Adam Broomberg and Oliver Chanarin =

English photography duo

Adam Broomberg (born 1970) and Oliver Chanarin (born 1971) are artists living and working in London.

Together they have had numerous international exhibitions. Their work is represented in major public and private collections. They were awarded the Deutsche Börse Photography Prize for their book War Primer 2, described as a "book that physically inhabits the pages of Bertolt Brecht's remarkable 1955 publication War Primer." They were awarded the International Center of Photography Infinity Award for their publication, Holy Bible.

Broomberg and Chanarin founded the imprint Chopped Liver Press to publish and sell their own books as well as those by other artists.

Broomberg was born in Johannesburg, South Africa and Chanarin was born in London.

== Publications ==
- Trust. London: Westzone, 2000.
- Ghetto. London: Trolley, 2003.
- Mr Mkhize's Portrait. London: Trolley, 2004. ISBN 1904563317.
- Chicago. SteidlMACK, 2006.
- Fig. Göttingen: Steidl; Brighton: Photoworks, 2007. ISBN 978-3865214751.
- The Red House. Göttingen: Steidl, 2007.
- People in Trouble Laughing Pushed to the Ground. London: Mack, 2011. ISBN 978-1907946042.
- War Primer 2. London: Mack, 2011. ISBN 978-1-907946-15-8. Edition of 100 copies.
  - Digital edition. Mapp. A version of the printed book with essays about War Primer by Bertolt Brecht. (Note: The digital edition of the book is available for free here at Mapp.)
  - Paperback. London: Mack, 2018. ISBN 978-1-912339-14-3.
- SPBH Book Club Vol 1. London: Self Publish, Be Happy, 2012.
- Holy Bible. London: Mack; AMC, 2013. ISBN 978-1907946417.
- Scarti. London: Trolley, 2013. ISBN 978-1907112461.
- Dodo. Mexico City: Editorial RM / JUMEX, 2014. ISBN 978-8415118923.
- Humans and Other Animals. London: Tate Publishing, 2015. ISBN 978-1849763677
- Spirit is a Bone. London: Mack, 2015. ISBN 9781910164181.

== Awards ==
- 2004: Vic Odden Award, Royal Photographic Society, Bath, England.
- 2013: Deutsche Börse Photography Prize, The Photographers' Gallery, London, for War Primer 2
- 2014: Infinity Award, International Center of Photography, New York City.

== Exhibitions ==
- British Art Show 8, Leeds; Edinburgh; Norwich; Southampton.
- "Rudiments", Center for Contemporary Art, Ujazdowski Castle, Warsaw.
- "Rudiments", Lisson Gallery, London.
- Conflict, Time, Photography, Tate Modern, London, November 2014 – March 2015; Museum Folkwang, Essen, 10 April – 5 July 2015.
- To Photograph the Details of a Dark Horse in Low Light, Foam Fotografiemuseum Amsterdam, Amsterdam, Netherlands.
- Shanghai Biennale 2014, Shanghai.
- Cross Section of a Revolution, Lisson Gallery, London.
- New Photography 2013, Museum of Modern Art, New York City.
- Tate galleries, London.
- Apexart, New York City.
- Gwangju Biennale, Gwangju, South Jeolla province, South Korea.
- Stedelijk Museum Amsterdam, Amsterdam, Netherlands.
- International Center of Photography, New York City.
- Kunst-Werke Institute for Contemporary Art, Berlin.
- The Photographers' Gallery, London.
- Mathaf: Arab Museum of Modern Art, Doha, Qatar.
- Dodo, Colección Júmex, Mexico City.
- Divine Violence, Mostyn, Llandudno, north Wales, July–November 2014, included Broomberg & Chanarin's Afterlife.

== Collections ==
- Tate, London.
- Museum of Modern Art, New York City.
- Stedelijk Museum Amsterdam.
- Victoria and Albert Museum, London.
- Musée de l'Élysée, Lausanne, Switzerland.
- International Center of Photography, New York City.
- Art Gallery of Ontario, Toronto.
- Galería NoguerasBlanchard, Madrid / Barcelona
