= Brighton Photo Biennial =

Photography festival in Brighton, England

- Status: Active
- Genre: Festival
- Date: October
- Begins: 24 September 2020
- Ends: 25 October 2020
- Frequency: Bi-annually
- Location: Brighton
- Country: United Kingdom
- Inaugurated: 2003
- Founder: Jeremy Miller
- Attendance: 100,000
- Major events: Photography
- Organiser: Photoworks
- Website: photoworks.org.uk/photoworks-festival/

Brighton Photo Biennial (BPB), now known as Photoworks Festival, is a month-long festival of photography in Brighton, England, produced by Photoworks. The festival began in 2003 and is often held in October. It plays host to curated exhibitions across the city of Brighton and Hove in gallery and public spaces. Previous editions have been curated by Jeremy Millar (2003), Gilane Tawadros (2006), Julian Stallabrass (2008), Martin Parr (2010) and Photoworks (2012). Brighton Photo Biennial announced its merger with Photoworks in 2006 and in 2020 its name was changed to Photoworks Festival.

Brighton Photo Fringe (BPF) runs in parallel to the Biennial, providing a complimentary series of exhibitions and talks.

== Organisation ==
The festival began in 2003. It announced its merger with Photoworks in 2006 following a successful Arts Council England National Portfolio funding application that secured the future of the newly merged organisation for three years. The first edition of the Biennial produced under new leadership was BPB12 Agents of Change: Photography and the Politics of Space produced and curated by Photoworks.

== Festival editions ==
=== BPB03 ===
In 2003 Jeremy Miller became the inaugural curator of the Brighton Photo Biennial. This edition of the festival included exhibitions, Make Life Beautiful! The Dandy in Photography at Brighton Museum & Art Gallery, Parade by Mark Leckey at Fabrica (formerly the Holy Trinity Church, Brighton), The Inconsiderable Things by Rachel Harrison and Peter Fraser at the University of Brighton Gallery, To Be Honest an open submission exhibition at Phoenix Gallery and Untitled by Boris Mikhailov at the Gardner Arts Centre.

In addition to the exhibitions, Brighton Photo Biennial 2003 included projects outside of the gallery context. These included a collaboration with Swiss artist Beat Streuli and local newspaper, The Argus, where images by the artist of the city's inhabitants were distributed as a pull-out in the paper over three consecutive Saturdays. Other projects from the festival included Wind Blown Cloud by Alec Finlay, Insight by Patrick Killoran and The London to Brighton Art Car Rally and Boot Sale in collaboration with Vauxhall Motors.

The Art Car Rally and Boot Sale has continued to beyond the Brighton Photo Biennial festival and has now been running annually since 2004.

=== BPB06 ===
Curated by Gilane Tawadros (now a Trustee of Photoworks). Gilane's vision of the BPB presented a mix of historic and contemporary photography through exhibitions of artworks and shows from Adel Abdessemed, Richard Avedon, Phyllis Baldino, David Claerbout, William Eggleston, Walker Evans, Paul Fusco, Alfredo Jaar, Gabriel Kuri, Van Leo, Glenn Ligon, Steve McQueen, Lee Miller, Richard Misrach, Henna Nadeem, Mitra Tabrizian, Fiona Tan, Kara Walker, Andy Warhol and Orson Welles.

The Henna Nadeem exhibition, A Picture Book of Britain led to the Photoworks publication of the same name with text by David Chandler and Dr Benedict Burbridge.

=== BPB08 ===
Brighton Photo Biennial 2008 entitled Memory of Fire: The War of Images and Images of War was curated by renown British art historian Julian Stallabrass and explored the representation, saturation, use and currency of images of modern conflict. The festival, named after Eduardo Galeano's publication of the same name, saw ten exhibitions exploring the theme from a wide variety of artists, citizen journalists, the media and public.

Stallabrass' edition of the festival saw it extend beyond the city of Brighton and Hove to nearby regions of Chichester, Winchester, Eastbourne, Hastings and Portsmouth. These exhibitions included Agent Orange at Pallant House Gallery with works by Philip Jones Griffiths, Designs for Solidarity at the Design Archives, Iraq Through the Lens of Vietnam at the University of Brighton Gallery, Photographing the First World War at Charleston Farmhouse, Photography & Revolution: Memory Trails through the Latin American Left at The Winchester Gallery, The Sublime Image of Destruction at De La Warr Pavilion, Unveiled: Voices of Women in Afghanistan at Independent Photographers Gallery, War Memorial at Aspex, Why, Mister, Why? and Baghdad Calling at Lighthouse and the controversial The Incommensurable Banner at Fabrica.

The Incommensurable Banner received critical acclaim and controversial press during the Brighton Photo Biennial 2008 and in New York where it was exhibited prior to the UK, both locally and nationally for its display of graphic imagery, resulting in the exhibition closing its doors to those under 18 years old.

This highly topical edition of the festival led to Stallabrass' revisiting of the works and artists in the 2013 Photoworks publication, Memory of Fire: Images of War and the War of Images which he edited. The book contextualised the exhibitions, talks and works presented in the 2008 Biennial and supplemented them with new works, interviews and critiques. This publication received critical acclaim within the photography industry through reviews in The Art Newspaper, Aperture Online and 1000Words.

=== BPB10 ===
2010 saw the British documentary photographer, Martin Parr take the helm as Curator, titling the edition New Documents - portraying the vibrancy of photography in reflection of the diversity of the city of Brighton & Hove. Photography critic Sean O'Hagan commented in The Guardian that, "This year's Brighton Photo Biennial may yet become the model for the great British photo festival of the future".

In addition to the usual format of exhibitions in and around the city, Parr's BPB again extended the scope of the festival by pitching itself as the UK's first "frameless" photography festival and commissioning some of the artists to produce site-specific work for the Brighton context. Parr gave his reason for this, “As curator, I want to make this festival fresh, distinctive and focused on Brighton & Hove. This city is the ideal venue for a Photo Biennial. It has a natural cultural constituency of its own, and its proximity to London promises a potentially huge audience. By presenting the very best new work in an exciting and imaginative way, Brighton Photo Biennial 2010 will continue to put photography in Brighton & Hove on the national and international map.". In its fourth edition, the 2010 Biennial's programme of events had also grown to include a larger education and participation strand than previous editions. This led to the inclusion of Brighton's White Night that encouraged the public and artists to engage with photography and light in different and unexpected ways.

=== BPB12 ===
The first edition of the Biennial following the merger of BPB with Photoworks, Brighton Photo Biennial 2012, Agents of Change: Photography and the Politics of Space was curated by Photoworks' Director, Celia Davies, and Programme Curator Dr Benedict Burbridge. Following in the footsteps of its predecessors, the BPB12 grew again, hosting 14 exhibitions across Brighton & Hove, 7 workshops and 19 talks & symposia.

The exhibitions portrayed acclaimed national and international contemporary photographic practitioners and filmmakers who explored the theme through images of activism, conflict, uprisings, protest and urban exploration. It included:

- Four Versions of Three Routes, Preston is My Paris
- Control Order House', Edmund Clark
- Uneven Development, Jason Larkin and Corine Silva
- Freedom is a Career, John 'Hoppy' Hopkins
- Geographies of Seeing, Trevor Paglen
- October, Thomson & Craighead
- Five Thousand Feet is the Best, Omer Fast
- Urban Exploration by Various Artists
- Critical Image Cairo, Alternative News Agency and Ronnie Close
- The Beautiful Horizon, No Olho da Rua
- Whose Streets? photographs from The Argus archives
- Political Squatting in Brighton Another Space
- Urban Farming in London and Havana Lulu Ash
- BPB and Photobook Show various artists

The Agents of Change 2012 Biennial attracted over 100,000 visits from 6 October - 4 November 2012, making it one of Europe's largest photography festivals.

Critic Peter Popham described BPB12 as "edgier than ever" for its tackling of difficult subject matter such as poverty, wealth disparity and politics in the Independent. The poster image for the festival that year - Seafront Demo, 1983 from The Argus Archive project in Jubilee Square - made the local press as one of the protesters depicted identified herself from the image she had long ago forgotten. The protester, Janice Harnden, had spotted herself in the image whilst walking past the University of Brighton Gallery. An interview conducted by Natalie Lloyd with Janice can be read on the Photoworks site.

=== BPB14 ===
The sixth Brighton Photo Biennial was held from 4 October - 2 November 2014. The theme was 'Communities, collectives and collaboration'. There was no single curator, but rather an emphasis on partnerships.

=== BPB16 ===
The seventh Brighton Photo Biennial was held from 1–30 October 2016. The theme was "Beyond the Bias - Reshaping Image".

=== BPB18 ===
The eighth Brighton Photo Biennial was entitled "A New Europe", exploring the themes of Brexit and the changes it will bring about in Britain and Europe, as well as the migrant crisis and the rise of far-right politics.

=== Photoworks Festival 2020 ===
In 2020 the festival was renamed Photoworks Festival. It will take place from 24 September to 25 October with a theme of Propositions for Alternative Narratives. Participants include Farah Al Qasimi, Poulomi Basu, Roger Eberhard, Ivars Grāvlejs, Yijun Liao (Pixy Liao), and Alberta Whittle. Due to social distancing measures related to the COVID-19 pandemic, the festival will take three forms: outdoor exhibitions on billboards throughout Brighton and Hove; a deconstructable magazine that can be displayed at home, with posters, and texts by Julia Bunnemann, Simon Baker, Pamila Gupta, Thyago Nogueira and others; and online.

== Brighton Photo Fringe ==
Brighton Photo Fringe (BPF) runs in parallel to the Biennial, providing a complimentary series of exhibitions and talks.

== See also ==
- Format International Photography Festival
- Look Photo Biennial
