= Photoworks =

British visual arts agency

- Predecessor: Cross Channel Photographic Mission (CCPM)
- Formation: 1995
- Founders: Anne McNeill, Liz Kent
- Founded at: St Leonards-on-Sea
- Location: 28 Kensington Street, Brighton and Hove, England BN1 4AJ
- Board of directors: Louise Fedotov-Clements
- Staff: 8 FTEs
- Website: photoworks.org.uk

Photoworks is a UK development agency dedicated to photography, based in Brighton, England and founded in 1995. It commissions and publishes new photography and writing on photography; publishes the Photoworks Annual, a journal on photography and visual culture, tours Photoworks Presents, a live talks and events programme, and produces the Brighton Photo Biennial, the UK's largest international photography festival Brighton Photo Biennial,. It fosters new talent through the organisation of the Jerwood/Photoworks Awards in collaboration with the Jerwood Charitable Foundation.

It has published photography books by Daniel Meadows, Mark Power, Stephen Gill, Rinko Kawauchi and Joachim Schmid, and published books written or edited by Val Williams.

Photoworks is a registered charity, funded by Arts Council England and one of Arts Council England's National Portfolio Organisations. Photoworks in collaboration with local, national and international partners, connect artists with diverse audiences. Its internationally recognised programme includes commissions, exhibitions, publishing, learning and large-scale public events.

== History ==
Photoworks formed out of the Cross Channel Photographic Mission (CCPM) arts project in St Leonards-on-Sea in 1995. It initially consisted of founding director and curator Anne McNeill and projects manager Liz Kent. In 1997, the organisation moved to Maidstone and then in 2003 to Brighton.

In 2011, Photoworks merged with Brighton Photo Biennial.

== Directors ==
- 1995–1997: Anne McNeill
- 1997–2010: David Chandler
- 2010–2013: Emma Morris
- 2013–2017: Celia Davies
- 2018–2022: Shoair Mavlian
- 2023–present: Louise Fedotov-Clements

== Jerwood/Photoworks Awards ==
The Jerwood/Photoworks Awards is a biennial award given to emerging photographers in the UK who make their own photography, or those who use photographs, archives or found photography. It is a collaboration between the Jerwood Charitable Foundation and Photoworks, supported by Arts Council England, that launched in 2014.

The winners, announced early in the year, receive a financial award (£10,000 as of 2018) plus a £5,000 production fund, and mentoring programme for the duration of that year. The resulting work is shown in a group exhibition at Jerwood Space in London from November and tours to other venues in the UK (Impressions Gallery in Bradford and Open Eye Gallery in Liverpool in 2015 to 2016).

=== Winners ===
- 2015: Matthew Finn, Joanna Piotrowska and Tereza Zelenkova. Their mentors were Gillian Wearing, Simon Roberts, Broomberg & Chanarin, Alec Soth, Michael Mack, curator and art historian Rodrigo Orrantia and Financial Times photography critic Francis Hodgson.
- 2017: Alejandra Carles-Tolra, Sam Laughlin and Lua Ribeira.
- 2018: Silvia Rosi and Theo Simpson
- 2021: Heather Agyepong and Joanne Coates

== Publications ==
- Noblesse Oblige. By Chris Harrison. [Kent]: Photoworks, 1996. ISBN 0-9517427-0-1. Essay by Peter Jerrome. This is the first of The Country Life series of commissions curated by Val Williams, where artists respond to the George Garland Collection.
- Numbered Portraits. Maidstone: Photoworks, 1996. ISBN 0-9517427-5-2. Photographs by George Garland, photographed and edited by Val Williams from the George Garland archive. Essay by Colin Bennett.
- Toeing the Line. By Magali Nougarède. Maidstone: Photoworks; Antwerp: Fotomuseum Antwerp, 2000. ISBN 0-9517427-9-5. Essay by Liz Kent. Edition of 1,000.
- The Whole Story. By Helen Sear. Maidstone: Photoworks, 2000. ISBN 0-9517427-6-0. Published to accompany the exhibition The Whole Story, November–December 2000, Maidstone Library Gallery. Includes an interview between Helen Sear and the curator Liz Kent. Edition of 1,000 copies.
- The Front. By Effie Paleologou. Maidstone: Photoworks, 2000. ISBN 0-9517427-4-4. Essay by Liz Kent. Published to accompany the exhibition The Front, September–November 2000, Hastings Museum and Art Gallery. Edition of 1,000 copies.
- Kingswood. Maidstone, Kent: Photoworks, 2000. ISBN 0953534049. By Susan Derges
- Tracing Light. Maidstone, Kent: Photoworks, 2001. ISBN 0-9517427-8-7. By David Alan Mellor. With Garry Fabian Miller.
- The Treasury Project. By Mark Power. Brighton: Photoworks, 2002. ISBN 978-1-903796-05-4. Edition of 1500 copies, of which only 500 were made available for public sale.
- Salvaged 52. By Dennis Doran. Brighton: Photoworks, 2004. ISBN 1-903796-11-3. Edition of 500 copies.
- Visible Time. By David Claerbout. Brighton: Photoworks; University of Brighton, 2004. ISBN 1-903796-12-1. Essays by David Green, Joanna Lowry and Gregory Currie. "Published in association with the University of Brighton, to accompany an exhibition at the Herbert Read Gallery, Kent Institute of Art & Design, Canterbury in 2004".
- The House in the Middle. Edited by Gordon MacDonald. Brighton: Photoworks, 2004. ISBN 1-903796-14-8. Photographs by Danny Treacy, Paul Reas, John Kippin, Richard Billingham, Jo Broughton, Dirk Wackerfuss, Anne Hardy, John Paul Bichard, The Design Council Archive, the BBC Picture Library, the Collection of Chris Mullen, Protect and Survive and the Los Alamos National Library. Text by Althea Greenan. "Published to coincide with a Photoworks exhibition at the Towner Art Gallery, Eastbourne, in 2004." Edition of 1,000 copies.
- Monograph - Nigel Shafran. Brighton: Photoworks; Göttingen: Steidl, 2004. ISBN 3-88243-976-9. Photographs by Nigel Shafran. Edited by Celia Davies, with essays by Val Williams and Paul Elliman, and an interview with Shafran by Charlotte Cotton.
- Nature Studies. By Neeta Madhar. Brighton: Photoworks, 2005. ISBN 1-903796-16-4. "Published by Photoworks to coincide with the first complete showing of Falling at Fabrica in Brighton during October 2005." Essays by David Chandler and Carlo McCormick. Includes a DVD of the film Falling. Edition of 500 copies.
- Bettina von Zwehl. Monograph, with an essay by Darian Leader and an interview with Charlotte Cotton. Göttingen: Steidl; Brighton: Photoworks, 2007. ISBN 978-3865212887.
- Fig. By Adam Broomberg & Oliver Chanarin. Göttingen: Steidl; Brighton: Photoworks, 2007. ISBN 9783865214751.
- 26 Different Endings. By Mark Power. Brighton: Photoworks, 2007. ISBN 978-1-903-79621-4. Edition of 1,000 copies.
- Photoworks 1982 - 2007. By Joachim Schmid. Brighton: Photoworks; Göttingen: Steidl; New York: Tang Museum & Art Gallery, 2007. ISBN 978-386521-394-5. Texts by Stephen Bull, Frits Giertsberg, Joan Fontcuberta, Jan-Erik Lundstrom, Val Williams and John S. Weber.
- Theatres of the Real. Edited by Joanna Lowry and David Green. With work by Sarah Dobai, Annabel Elgar, Tom Hunter, Sarah Pickering, Nigel Shafran, Clare Strand, Mitra Tabrizian, Danny Treacy. Essays by Jan Baetens, David Green and Joanna Lowry. Brighton: Photoworks, 2009. ISBN 978-1-903796-26-9. "Published to accompany the exhibition Theatres of the Real, curated by Joanna Lowry and David Green for Fotomuseum Provincie Antwerpen." Edition of 1,000 copies.
- The Sound of Two Songs. By Mark Power. Brighton: Photoworks, 2010. ISBN 978-1-903-79639-9. Edition of 2000 copies.
- Brighton Picture Hunt. Photographs by Carmen Soth, edited by Alec Soth. Brighton: Photoworks, 2010.
- Outside In. By Stephen Gill. Brighton: Photoworks; London: Archive of Modern Conflict, 2010. ISBN 978-1-903796-40-5. Produced as part of Gill's commission to make a series of photographs for the 2010 Brighton Photo Biennial.
- Murmuration. By Rinko Kawauchi. Brighton: Photoworks, 2010. ISBN 978-1-903796-41-2.
- Daniel Meadows: Edited Photographs from the 70s and 80s. By Val Williams. Photographs by Daniel Meadows. Brighton: Photoworks, 2011. ISBN 1-903796-46-6.
- The Myth of the Airborne Warrior. By Stuart Griffiths. Brighton: Photoworks, 2011. ISBN 978-1-903796-45-0. Edited by Gordon MacDonald. Edition of 500 copies.
- Memory of Fire. By Julian Stallabrass. Brighton: Photoworks, 2013. ISBN 978-1-903796-49-8.
- Not Going Shopping. By Anthony Luvera. Brighton: Photoworks, 2014. Newspaper format. (Note: Not Going Shopping can be viewed here within the Photoworks site.)

=== Magazine ===
- Photoworks issue 1. Brighton: Photoworks, 2003.
- Photoworks issue 2. Brighton: Photoworks, 2004.
- Photoworks issue 3. Brighton: Photoworks, 2004.
- Photoworks issue 4. Brighton: Photoworks, 2005.
- Photoworks issue 5. Brighton: Photoworks, 2005.
- Photoworks issue 6. Brighton: Photoworks, 2006.
- Photoworks issue 7. Brighton: Photoworks, 2006.
- Photoworks issue 8. Brighton: Photoworks, 2007.
- Photoworks issue 9. Brighton: Photoworks, 2007.
- Photoworks issue 10. Brighton: Photoworks, 2008.
- Photoworks issue 11. Brighton: Photoworks, 2008.
- Photoworks issue 12. Brighton: Photoworks, 2009.
- Photoworks issue 13. Brighton: Photoworks, 2009. ISBN 978-1-903796-30-6.
- Photoworks issue 14. Brighton: Photoworks, 2010.
- Photoworks issue 15. Brighton: Photoworks, 2010. ISBN 978-1-903796-32-0.
- Photoworks issue 16. Brighton: Photoworks, 2011. ISBN 978-1-903796-33-7.
- Photoworks issue 17. Brighton: Photoworks, 2011. ISBN 978-1-903796-34-4.
- Photoworks issue 18. Brighton: Photoworks, 2012. ISBN 978-1-903796-35-1.
- Photoworks issue 19: Agents of change: photography and the politics of space. Brighton: Photoworks, 2012. ISBN 9781903796368.
- Photoworks Annual Issue 20: Family Politics. Brighton: Photoworks, 2013. ISBN 978-1-903796-37-5.
- Photoworks Annual Issue 21: Collaboration. Brighton: Photoworks, 2014. ISBN 9781903796504. Edited by Mariama Attah.
- Photoworks Annual Issue 22: Women. Brighton: Photoworks, 2015.
