= List of songs recorded by Stateless =

This is a comprehensive list of songs by English electronic alternative rock band Stateless that have been officially released. Since forming in 2003, the band have released two studio albums, and one extended play (EP). This list does not contain live versions or remixes released by the band.

== Original songs ==
Title	Album/Single	First release	Notes
"Ariel"	Matilda, Ariel (single)	2009	
"Assassinations"	Matilda	2011	
"Avalanche"	Sixfold Symmetry EP	2015	
"Ballad of NGB"	Matilda	2011	
"Bloodstream"	The Bloodstream EP	2005	Re-released in 2007 on Stateless. Featured as the last song in the first-season finale of The Vampire Diaries.
"Blue Fire (feat. Amenta)"	I'm on Fire EP	2011	
"Bluetrace"	The Bloodstream EP	2005	Re-released in 2007 on Stateless.
"Case in Ice"	Sixfold Symmetry EP	2015	
"Crash"	Stateless	2007	
"Curtain Call"	Matilda	2011	
"Down Here"	Down Here SP	2004	Re-released in 2007 on Stateless. Also appeared earlier as part of The Studio Sessions (live), which was available as a free download in 2004.
"Exit"	Web exclusive, Stateless	2003	Re-released in 2005 and 2007 on The Bloodstream EP and Stateless.
"Great White Whale"	Window 23/Great White Whale SP (featuring Gavin Castleton)	2008	
"Horizon"	Down Here SP	2004	Also appeared earlier as part of The Studio Sessions (live), which was available as a free download in 2004.
"Hurricane"	Exit SP	2007	
"I Shall Not Complain"	Matilda	2011	
"I'm On Fire"	Matilda	2011	
"Inscape"	The Bloodstream EP	2005	Re-released in 2007 on Stateless.
"Junior"	Matilda	2011	
"Lose Myself"	Prism #1 SP	2007	Originally an unreleased track, however it was released on the "Prism #1" single.
"Matilda"	Matilda	2011	Released as bonus track with digital release of Matilda.
"Miles to Go"	Matilda	2011	Appeared in the 2012 video game Sleeping Dogs.
"Prism #1"	Stateless	2003	Re-released in 2007 on Stateless.
"Prism #2"	Prism #1 SP	2007	Marked as "Kidkanevil Remix", however bears little resemblance to Prism #1, including completely new lyrics.
"Radiokiller"	Web exclusive, Stateless	2005	
"Red Sea"	Matilda	2011	
"Running Out"	Stateless	2007	Also appeared earlier as part of The Studio Sessions (live), which was available as a free download in 2004.
"Song for the Outsider"	Matilda	2011	
"The Door"	Sixfold Symmetry EP	2015	
"Whiter than Snow"	n/a	2004	Credited but an unreleased, and unobtainable song.
"The Third Light"	Sixfold Symmetry EP	2015	
"This Language" (featuring Lateef the Truthspeaker)	Stateless	2007	
"Visions"	Matilda	2011	
"Awake"	n/a	2004	Credited but an unreleased, and unobtainable song.
"Wade In"	Window 23/Great White Whale (featuring Gavin Castleton)	2008	Released as bonus track with digital single release and as a free download.
"Window 23"	Window 23/Great White Whale (featuring Gavin Castleton)	2008	
"You Choose"	n/a	2011	Unreleased track from Matilda sessions. Originally available as free download from band's Facebook page, now on Ninja Tune SoundCloud.
