= The Wire (magazine) =

British experimental music magazine

- "Freedom Principles"; The Wire no. 370, Dec. 2014
- Editor: Emily Bick; see timeline below for former editors
- Categories: Music magazine
- Frequency: Monthly
- Publisher: Tony Herrington
- Founder: Anthony Wood, Chrissie Murray
- First issue: Summer 1982
- Company: The Wire Magazine Ltd. (independently owned)
- Based in: London, England
- Language: English
- Website: thewire.co.uk
- ISSN: 0952-0686

The Wire (or simply Wire) is a British music magazine published in London, which has been issued monthly in print since 1982. Its website launched in 1997, and an online archive of its entire back catalogue became available to subscribers in 2013. Since 1985, the magazine's annual year-in-review issue, Rewind, has named an album or release of the year based on critics' ballots.

Originally, The Wire covered the British jazz scene with an emphasis on avant-garde and free jazz. It was marketed as a more adventurous alternative to its conservative competitor Jazz Journal, and targeted younger readers at a time when Melody Maker had abandoned jazz coverage. In the late 1980s and 1990s, the magazine expanded its scope until it included a broad range of musical genres under the umbrella of non-mainstream or experimental music. Since then, The Wire's coverage has included experimental rock, electronica, alternative hip hop, modern classical, free improvisation, nu jazz and traditional music.

The magazine has been independently owned since 2001, when the six permanent staff members purchased the magazine from previous owner Naim Attallah.

== Publication history ==
Timeline: 1982–present
← / Mark Sinker (Jul 1992 – Feb 1994); ← / 1st issue Summer 1982; ← / 100th issue Jun 1992; ← / 200th issue Oct 2000; ← / 300th issue Feb 2009; ← / 400th issue Jun 2017; ← / Emily Bick (August 2024 – present)
(view • discuss)

The Wire is a monthly magazine that specialises in a diverse spectrum of avant-garde and experimental music. A 1999 subscription flyer for the magazine advertised its subject matter as "non-mainstream" music. In the late 1980s and early 1990s The Wire transitioned from exclusive coverage of jazz to coverage of contemporary music in general, maintaining its prioritisation of the avant-garde. Since its founding in 1982, its monthly circulation has reportedly ranged from about 7,000 to about 20,000.

Within the American and British music journalism markets, The Wire was among a generation of music magazines launched in the 1980s. That decade also saw the debuts of The Face (1980), Kerrang! (1981), Maximumrocknroll (1982), Mixmag (1983), Alternative Press (1985), Spin (1985), Q (1986), Hip Hop Connection (1988) and The Source (1988), among others. According to writer Simon Warner, The Wire took on a level of "influence disproportionate to its niche readership" compared to other music magazines born in the 1980s, because "not only listeners but music makers and producers were drawn to its columns."

Most of these magazines, The Wire included, differentiated themselves by targeting a narrow segment of readers based on demographics and taste. This was commonly done, for example, by devoting coverage to specific musical subcultures as Kerrang! did with heavy metal or The Source with hip hop. Another industry trend was polarisation between two styles of writing: popular criticism for mass-market consumers versus intellectual criticism for underground music connoisseurs. The Wire was certainly positioned at the "highbrow" end of the industry—even if, as editor Tony Herrington said, the magazine preferred "intelligence to intellectualism". Its embrace of high-minded, literate criticism aligned it with publications such as New Statesman, a politics and culture magazine that started to publish pieces by rock journalists, and Melody Maker, which had hired a group of academically oriented new writers like Simon Reynolds who were influenced by post-structuralism. The Wire contrasted most sharply in approach with Q, which emphasised celebrity personalities and the classic-rock canon.

The Wire was among the major British music magazines of the 1990s, a decade that represented an overall peak for the print magazine industry before the next two decades brought the rise of digital journalism and a general decline in print readership. However, The Wire has held a steady circulation and remained in print even as other magazines that once sported much larger circulations have folded or become online-only titles. NME once sold 300,000 weekly copies at its peak in the 1970s, but by 2016 it only sold 20,000—the same number The Wire sold at that time—and in March 2018 NME ended its print edition altogether. The Wire was considered one of the most significant independently owned publications covering the musical underground in the 2000s, alongside Fact, Rock-A-Rolla, Dusted and innumerable blogs.

=== 1982: Founding as a jazz magazine ===
"The Wire" (1974) – Steve Lacy Sextet
The Wire was named after a composition by Steve Lacy (pictured at left), an avant-garde jazz saxophonist whose "musical farsightedness" the magazine's founders admired.

The Wire debuted as a quarterly jazz magazine in the summer of 1982. The magazine was co-founded by jazz promoter Anthony Wood and journalist Chrissie Murray. Lacking office space, Wood and Murray prepared the first issues of the magazine from an Italian restaurant on St Martin's Lane. The staff sold copies of the first issue to concert-goers at a jazz festival in Knebworth and at the Camden Jazz Festival.

At that time, Germany was considered the cultural centre of jazz in Europe—especially European free jazz. There was greater cultural appreciation for jazz in Germany than in Britain and a greater volume of dedicated press coverage, even though the British jazz scene was actually larger. In an introductory essay explaining the magazine's editorial policy and scope, Wood wrote that The Wire intended to target the demographic of listeners under the age of 25, who he felt were poorly served by the state of jazz writing in Britain. The only other British jazz magazine in print at the time was Jazz Journal, which Wood criticised for its conservative approach: "the reverend gentlemen at Jazz Journal continue, at best, to admit only grudgingly that jazz has got beyond 1948; at worst, deny its current development." In addition, Wood noted, the British weekly magazine Melody Maker had by 1982 virtually abandoned jazz coverage.

The Wire would emphasise boundary-pushing musicians; at the outset, Wood declared that free jazz and free improvisation would "be given a loud enough voice to be heard above the dissenters who are still questioning the music's validity." The magazine was named after "The Wire", a composition by American jazz saxophonist Steve Lacy, (Note: Lacy composed "The Wire" in tribute to the late jazz saxophonist Albert Ayler. "The Wire" of the title represents "the end, the wire that marks the boundary and announces his death", and the composition is "supposed to be a portrait of Albert Ayler, about a life cut short by the wire—down to the wire.") whose "musical farsightedness" the magazine hoped to emulate. Twenty years later, Lacy's composition was used as the opening track of the box set The Wire 20 Years 1982–2002.

=== 1983–84: Acquisition by the Namara Group ===
In 1984, Wood sold The Wire to Naim Attallah and it became part of the Namara Group. Attallah's other properties included Literary Review and Quartet Books. Wood announced the new owner, along with a switch from quarterly to monthly publishing, in the October 1984 issue.

Reflecting on the early years as part of the Namara Group, Tony Herrington said:

I think they thought it would be good to have a magazine to support Quartet's jazz titles. We were in this horrible little office off Oxford Street and it was weird because you'd run into Richard Ingrams, Auberon Waugh and Joan Bakewell chatting on the stairs. There were always debs flitting about, Simon Ward's kids, Susannah York's kids. There was no money about, but the great thing was [Attallah] just let us get on with it.

Attallah's laissez-faire attitude and the magazine's editorial freedom contrasted with the state of other UK music magazines in the 1980s. Competition among weeklies like NME, Melody Maker and Sounds heightened in the 1980s, and these publications began to prioritise circulation, advertising and commercial appeal, which resulted in editorial constraint. The Wire did not impose significant editorial demands or stylistic revisions on its writers and, as such, it became an attractive publication for freelancers who had started their careers at UK weeklies during the post-punk era.

=== 1985–1992: Expanding beyond jazz ===
Former NME staffer Richard Cook took over as editor in July 1985; by September, Wood's name was gone altogether from the masthead. Around this time there was a resurgence of interest in jazz among white British "hipsters"—a trend that lasted until the 1987 "Black Monday" market crash. As editor, Cook refurbished The Wire so it would seem stylish and appealing to the new wave of British jazz hipsters, but he increasingly steered the magazine toward a pluralistic, multi-genre approach. The Wire also began to develop a house style that tended toward the philosophical and cerebral, printing "articles peppered with references to Gilles Deleuze and Félix Guattari, or Jacques Attali's monograph Noise."

Under Cook's editorial oversight, The Wire significantly broadened its coverage of music in genres other than jazz. He hired a new graphic design team and promoted longtime contributor Mark Sinker to assistant editor. (Note: Sinker accepted the assistant editor position after NME asked him to rewrite a negative review of a U2 album. He refused, quitting NME altogether instead.) The formerly jazz-focused magazine's covers in this period featured decidedly non-jazz artists like Michael Jackson, Prince, Philip Glass, John Lee Hooker and Van Morrison; meanwhile, articles published inside the magazine profiled a broad range of musicians, including Elvis Costello, Stravinsky, Mozart, Frank Zappa, Prokofiev, Bob Marley and Haydn.

Cook told Jazz Forum in 1991 that The Wire was "going into overdrive" with ambitions to expand its domestic and international sales. Estimating the magazine's monthly circulation at 15,000–20,000 copies, Cook said he hoped to reach 25,000. But his efforts to expand the magazine's circulation had mixed results. Chris Parker, the magazine's publisher between 1984 and 1989, said the changes did not make an "appreciable" increase in sales; in Parker's view, "for every would-be hip young thing we recruited to the readership, we lost a diehard jazz fan who just wished to know if Howard Riley or Stan Tracey had made another album and what it was like."

Regardless of Cook's impact on sales figures, several of his contemporaries acknowledged that he had made The Wire a more accessible publication. Scottish writer Brian Morton said "[u]nder Cook's editorship, The Wire evolved from a small, coterie magazine into a more broadly based music journal that covered mainstream jazz as well as the avant-garde, but one that also began moving into other areas of music: pop, soul, reggae, classical." John Fordham, the jazz critic for The Guardian, credited Cook with "transforming [The Wire's] content and design and opening out a specialised, sometimes uninviting publication" to a broader audience. British-Ghanaian writer Kodwo Eshun pointed to "Black Science Fiction", an essay by Sinker from the February 1992 issue, as a major influence on Afrofuturism, a term that was coined the following year.

=== 1992–1994: Mark Sinker's editorship ===
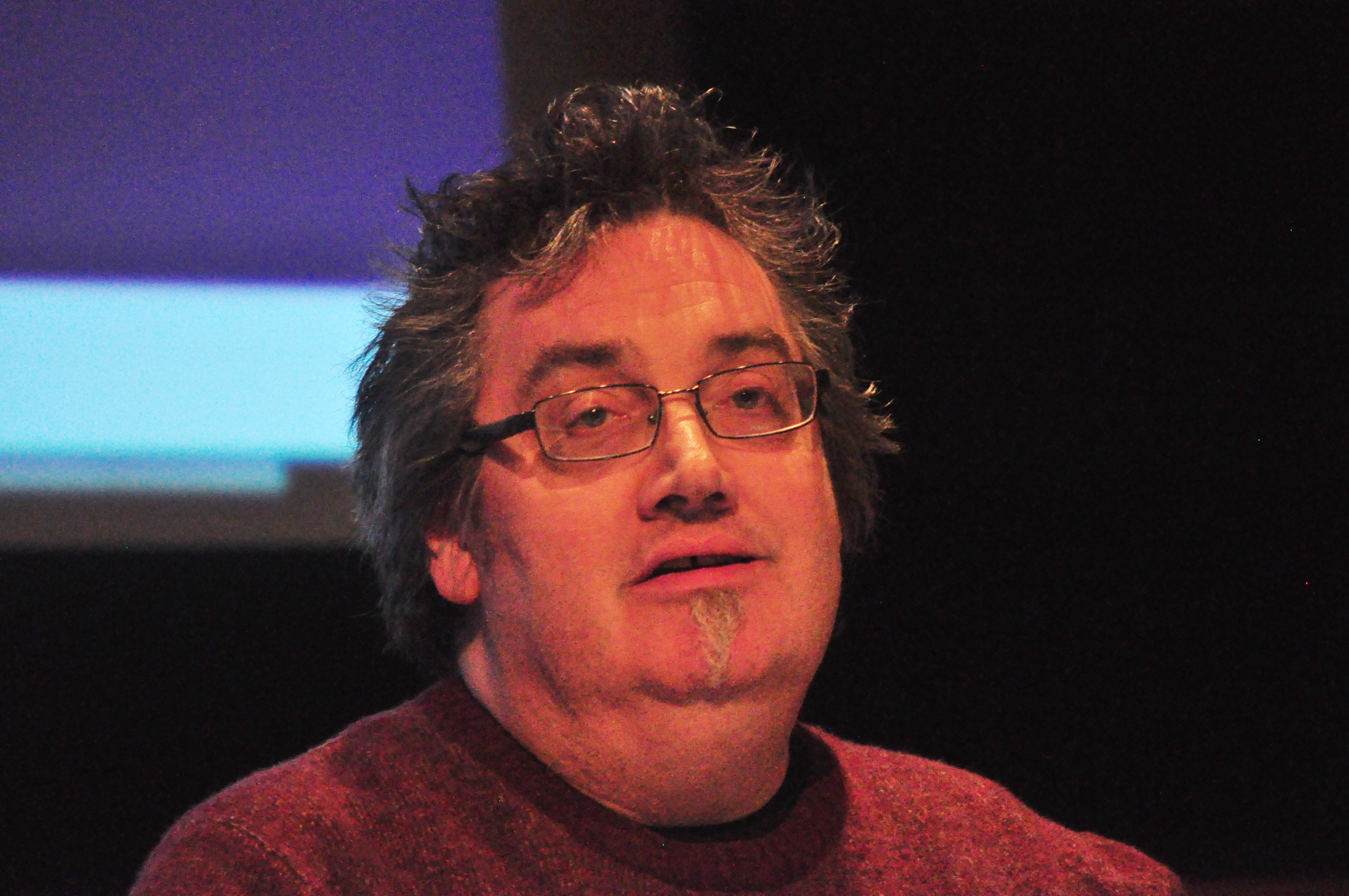
Mark Sinker (pictured in 2014) had a brief, controversial tenure as editor of The Wire. Though he was fired, his run as editor has received retrospective praise.

In June 1992, Cook left The Wire for a position at PolyGram UK and was succeeded by Sinker. Cook's departure coincided with the magazine's 100th issue, an unannounced move that caught Sinker by surprise. Though he only served as editor for 18 months, Sinker took a bold editorial approach. During his brief tenure, few covers featured portraits of musicians, and instead often featured abstract photos of isolated objects, like a sofa or a toy robot. Sinker devoted issues to broad themes such as "Music and Censorship", "Music in the Realm of Bodily Desire" and "Music and the American Dream", and for these issues he commissioned multiple argumentative essays on those topics. In retrospect, he characterised his attitude as editor thusly:

Losing money? Threatened with closure? Ignore all that. Old punky rule-of-thumb (just now made up): the contradiction is the hook—don't bury it, flaunt it. NO FUTURE NO FUTURE NO FUTURE: treat every issue as if it's the last, and go for broke with the material you have. I wanted (he writes with ten-year hindsight) an alert, funny journal which cruised its readers, chafed and teased and englamoured and thrilled and hurt and baffled and fucked with them—a space for speculative playful malicious unfrightened imagination which when it vanished (any moment, we all thought) left a questing shadow behind the heart.

Sinker's vision—later characterised as "a thorny, quizzical, fanzine cum proto-Weblog"—clashed with then-publisher Adele Yaron's ideal of "a sleek and stylish urban music 'n' lifestyle monthly". Yaron fired Sinker when a potential buyer requested his removal as part of, in Sinker's words, the "bride price" for the deal.

While Sinker's stint as editor was brief and controversial, music writers have praised his editorial decisions in retrospect and highlighted his influence on the magazine's future directions. The French writer-musician Rubin Steiner considered the August 1993 issue with Björk on the cover to be a definitive turning point, signalling the start of constant changes in coverage that would follow, after which The Wire could no longer be considered a jazz magazine. The Guardian columnist Maggoty Lamb said Sinker's tenure was "visionary" and had laid the "foundation" for the magazine to become a "thriving institutional presence". At Pitchfork, Tom Ewing argued that the argumentative articles Sinker commissioned "weren't simply trying to shock or drive readers off—they achieved both—but were trying to build, as ... Sinker put it, [a place] where people could 'have fun starting arguments,' ones that could co-exist within a comfort zone."

=== 1994–1999: "Adventures in Modern Music" ===
After Sinker was sacked, Tony Herrington took over as editor starting with the March 1994 issue. Herrington had contributed to the magazine as a freelancer since the 1980s, but he had minimal experience as an editor and had only become a permanent staffer the year prior. Yaron left shortly afterward, and so Herrington assumed the position of publisher as well. By January 1995 the magazine adopted the new subtitle "Adventures in Modern Music", which it used continuously until 2012.

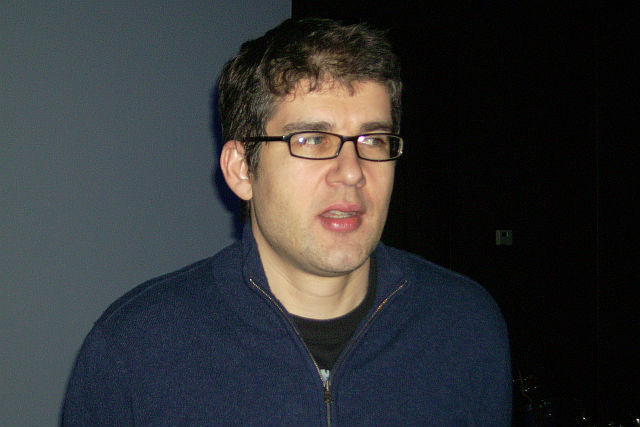
In the 1990s, longtime contributor Simon Reynolds (pictured in 2011) coined the genre "post-rock" and wrote influential essays on a variety of developments in rave that he termed the "hardcore continuum".

Two months after Herrington became editor, the magazine published an influential piece by Simon Reynolds in which he defined the parameters of the genre "post-rock". (Note: Reynolds had first used the term "post-rock" in a review of the album Hex by Bark Psychosis, published in the March 1994 issue of Mojo. He has also noted that the critics Richard Meltzer and Paul Morley used the term before him as a synonym for "avant-rock". Nevertheless, Reynolds's May 1994 essay on the subject in The Wire is generally credited as the meaningful origin of the term "post-rock" in its current usage, because it was there that Reynolds distinguished it from other experimental rock music, defined the genre's scope and applied the term to multiple artists for the first time.) The genre and its associated artists became a focus for the magazine in the mid to late 1990s, along with electronica and nascent subgenres like illbient and glitch. Throughout the decade, Reynolds also contributed a series of essays on post-rave trends in UK dance music, covering jungle, drum 'n' bass, hardstep, neurofunk and 2-step garage. These essays culminated in his theorising of the "hardcore continuum": a diverse, ever-evolving tradition of electronic dance music that had diverged from American-born house and techno to become a distinctly British style.

The magazine launched its website, thewire.co.uk, in October 1997. By 1999, the magazine reportedly reached a monthly circulation of about 20,000 copies.

=== 2000–present: Staff buyout and independent ownership ===
Rob Young became editor in March 2000. Later that year, the magazine's staff bought it from the Namara Group. When Herrington learned Naim Attallah was preparing for retirement and wanted to sell the magazine, he offered to buy it himself; Attallah replied "I know how much I pay you and you can't afford it." Herrington consulted with his fellow staffers, secured a loan and negotiated with Attallah for about six months. The six permanent members of the staff—Herrington, Young, Chris Bohn, Ben House, Anne Hilde Neset and Andy Tait—purchased the company on 21 December 2000 and announced the sale in the February 2001 issue. The magazine has been independently published since then.

In 2002, the magazine commemorated its 20th anniversary with a special issue, the publication of the book Undercurrents: The Hidden Wiring of Modern Music and a three-CD box set, The Wire 20 Years 1982–2002.

In the 2000s, The Wire devoted significant attention on the emerging genre of dubstep. Several musical genres were coined or first defined in the pages of The Wire in that decade, including microhouse, by Philip Sherburne, in 2001; New Weird America, by David Keenan, in 2003; and hypnagogic pop, also by Keenan, in 2009.

In 2007, The Wire reportedly sold about 17,500 copies per issue. A press release from the same year gave the magazine's monthly circulation as 20,000 copies, with 9,000 subscribers. In 2013, the magazine made available its entire archive—amounting to 25,000 pages at that time—to subscribers, via the site Exact Editions.

== Content ==
A series of new music compilation CDs called The Wire Tapper has been given away with the magazine since 1998. The magazine has used the strapline "Adventures in Modern Music" since 1994; on 14 December 2011 The Wire's staff announced that the magazine's old strapline "Adventures In Modern Music" had been replaced by "Adventures In Sound And Music". In addition to the Wire Tapper CDs, subscribers receive label, country and festival samplers.

Apart from the numerous album reviews every month, the magazine has features such as "The Invisible Jukebox", an interview conducted by way of unknown tracks being played to an artist, and "The Primer", an in-depth article on a genre or act. It also features the avant music scene of a particular city every issue. In addition to its musical focus, the magazine likes to investigate cover art and mixed media artistic works.

Since January 2003 The Wire has been presenting a weekly radio programme on the London community radio station Resonance FM, which uses the magazine's strapline as its title and is hosted in turns by members of The Wire.

The Wire celebrated its 400th issue in June 2017.

=== Design and photography ===
Various logos used by The Wire between 1982 and 2001, at which point the magazine adopted its current sans-serif logo

The Wire does not employ staff photographers. Instead, the magazine commissions all of its photography from freelancers or relies on musicians and labels to provide their own publicity photos. In recent years, the magazine has published work by photographers like Nigel Shafran, Todd Hido, Tom Hunter, Pieter Hugo, Alec Soth, Clare Shilland, Leon Chew, Jake Walters, Juan Diego Valera, Michael Schmelling, Mark Peckmezian, and Takashi Homma.

External images
- "The Elegant and Stylish Jazz Covers of Wire Magazine, 1987–90" – Gallery of selected covers designed by Paul Elliman and Lucy Ward.
- "The Wire — Covers" – Gallery of selected covers designed by Non-Format between April 2001 and March 2005.
- Every cover of The Wire at thewire.co.uk.

The Wire's first art director was Terry Coleman. Paul Elliman took over art direction in January 1986; by July, he debuted a serif-typeface logo that the magazine would continue to use, with variations, until 2001. Lucy Ward succeeded Elliman as art director in July 1988 and introduced a broader array of fonts. Under both Elliman and Ward, the minimalist aesthetic of The Wire favoured simple typography, black-and-white photography and ample white space.

Elliman and Ward's late-1980s work for The Wire has been praised by their contemporaries in the graphic design field. Robert Newman—a former design director at magazines like Entertainment Weekly, New York and The Village Voice—said The Wire's minimal design contrasted with colourful late-80s trends in both British and American magazine design. Newman said he was inspired by Elliman's designs and borrowed stylistic elements for his The Village Voice layouts. In Newman's opinion, Elliman and Ward produced "some of the most beautiful and remarkable magazine covers of that (or any) era, timeless designs that still look strikingly contemporary today." John L. Walters, an editor and owner of the quarterly design magazine Eye said their designs did not look "home made or like academic papers (or both)", as other specialist magazines of the time tended to look, and said the magazine "took musicians seriously, and its design made them look good without trying—be they stars, greying veterans or young turks." John O'Reilly cited Elliman's work for The Wire among the "most exciting and apparently vibrant work of the 1980s" and said it shared a "kind of melancholia" with Neville Brody's work from the period and Vaughan Oliver's designs for the record label 4AD.

A major redesign was completed in 2001 by Non-Format, a design team composed of Kjell Ekhorn and Jon Forss, who were working out of an office next to The Wire. Ekhorn and Forss were the magazine's art directors between 2001 and 2005. Herrington, who was familiar with their previous work designing music packaging, approached the team to redesign the magazine. In addition to designing the magazine's current logo, they designed each issue of the magazine until 2005. While they retained the magazine's overall clean, Modernist aesthetic, they incorporated highly intricate, unpredictable details into the designs of features. At first, Ekhorn and Forss created custom layouts and typographies in nearly every issue, rather than relying on standardised templates for features; however, this became too much work, and they eventually settled on using a single style across several months at a time. Their typographic work often added elaborate variations to base fonts, which included winding, branching curlicues and interwoven illustrative elements; Karen Sottosanti described their typical design work as "type made of stars or flowers that exploded into negative space [and] type that merged with images of tree branches or birds.".

David Jury praised Non-Format's designs, writing that the magazine "retained an identity all its own through its creative use of experimental headline fonts, white space and excellent photography." Noteworthy examples of Non-Format's cover art include the July 2004 issue, which portrayed the composer Alvin Lucier using brainwaves he had recorded with electrodes at a concert, and the December 2004 issue "In Praise of the Riff", which placed repetitive black lines across the cover and pushed the logo to the bottom right, halfway off the page. In 2011 Complex named Non-Format's March 2005 cover with MF Doom among the 50 greatest hip-hop magazine covers.

=== The Wire Rewind ===
Every January since 1986, The Wire has published a year-in-review issue with a critics' poll. The staff collates ballots submitted by its contributors into a list of the year's best releases. Originally, the poll only selected the best jazz LP of the year. In 1992, the main poll grew to include albums in any musical genre, and in 2011 it began accepting releases in any format or medium, not just "albums". In addition to the main all-genre list there are typically shorter lists of the best releases within selected genres as well. These year-in-review issues have been called Rewind since 1997.

Like the magazine itself, The Wire's critics' polls have garnered a reputation for their unconventional, eclectic selections. Guardian columnist Maggoty Lamb commented in 2007 that The Wire has "the annual best-of list most likely to single out an ensemble called Kiss the Anus of the Black Cat as having made 'one of the most interesting records of the year'." (Note: Kiss the Anus of the Black Cat is the name of a real musical group. The quote was taken from British writer Jim Haynes's reflection in the 2005 Rewind issue: "When a group with as terrible a name as Kiss the Anus of the Black Cat can have one of the most interesting records of the year, it's a good sign that 2005 was a remarkable year in music." Kiss the Anus of the Black Cat's 2005 record did not actually appear on any of The Wire's lists that year.) When the magazine named James Ferraro's vaporwave album Far Side Virtual its 2011 Release of the Year, Eric Grandy remarked in Seattle Weekly that it was "[n]o surprise that willfully obscurantist British rag the Wire's Best of 2011 list is topped by James Ferraro's winking Windows '97 soft-rock hellscape ... and further ranges from the Beach Boys' Smile Sessions to Laurel Halo and Hype Williams."

== Reception ==
Over the years, The Wire has received both praise and derision. Positive commentary about the magazine has often referred to its diverse range of coverage and unique status as a longstanding publication devoted to music outside the mainstream. In 2005 the writer Bill Martin called it an "invaluable resource" and said "there is no other English-language magazine today of comparable scope." On the occasion of the magazine's 400th issue in 2017, Josh Baines of Noisey praised the magazine for "examining—in the kind of detail that puts most other publications to shame—sound and music from every conceivable angle" and "treating boundary-pushing music with diligence, care, and above all else, enthusiasm". The same year, designer Adrian Shaughnessy said that he regarded The Wire and the British film magazine Sight & Sound as the only two magazines that "remain unmissable"; he said both publications had "serious writing at their core", which "is never softened to make it 'accessible' to a wider audience," and he said both were still "stonking good reads that have introduced me to hours of pleasure that I might otherwise have missed."

Unfavourable assessments of the magazine have often derided its avant-garde sensibility as pretentious, self-important and inaccessible. Gail Brennan at The Sydney Morning Herald opined in 1993 that The Wire "covers a surprising range of music while bringing a narrow and contrived 'punk' attitude to bear. Let's be blunt. It is a pretentious magazine." In 1999, The Wire was mocked in "The Rock Critical List", an anonymous zine distributed to newspapers and magazines that ridiculed a number of music journalists, critics and editors. (Note: Published under the pseudonym "JoJo Dancer", the list was perceived by some as insightful and (at least somewhat) witty, but it sparked controversy within the industry for its harsh personal attacks. It also triggered investigations to identify its true author. "JoJo Dancer" was widely believed, though never confirmed, to have been then-editor of Spin Charles Aaron.) The writer of "The Rock Critical List" had this to say about The Wire:

"[T]he British trainspotter's catechism The Wire [is] a monthly logjam of the most defensively arrogant, humorlessly dense, and gleefully school-marmish verbiage (David Toop excepted) you'll hopefully never encounter in any other music magazine. After institutionalizing the annoying Euro catchphrase 'electronica', lapping up everything DJ Spooky ever mumbled, and trashing rock-damaged Americans for not inducting Lamonte Young [sic] into the Baseball Hall of Fame, they just keep on droning."

Others within the avant-garde music scene have also criticised The Wire. For example Ben Watson, who has contributed to The Wire himself, critiqued the magazine's editorial approach to covering noise music. In Watson's view, the magazine has had a tendency to treat noise musicians' work as "so worthy, alternative and dis-corporate" that virtually all of it must be inherently meritorious. This tendency results in an institutional reluctance to distinguish between good noise music and mere noise, along with an excess of positive, yet shallow, reviews. Rather than delving deeper into the genre's radical political dimensions, Watson argued, The Wire has instead curated its noise coverage based on superficial trends of underground fashionability; he suggested that the writing may sometimes provide "a clue as to how some new crew of hopeless hairy Stateside noisemaker muffins have been selected: 'Thurston says they're okay...'." The magazine's writing on noise came to rely on a style of "descriptive objectivity" that studiously avoids any actual evaluation of quality; as Watson wrote,

[C]ritics are loath to dismiss anyone waving the Noise flag. ... This 'Fear of Avant' leads to the style of reviewing which pervades The Wire, where music is described like some exotic landscape the writer has witnessed from train or plane—they played high frazzles, then low drones, chucked in some steam engine samples, then did some drumming—with value judgments suspended. Chuck in some words like 'visceral' and 'ambient' and 'fractal' and the job's done.

Watson also recalled bristling at Herrington's suggestion to "think niche" when writing for the magazine, which he took as an anti-universalist and commercially motivated attitude.

In a 2007 interview, Herrington addressed the magazine's reputation for pondering music that he joked might "sound like a steamroller running over a broken fax machine", saying: "Most people would take the mickey out of some bloke making music by bowing away at the femur of a mountain goat, but we'll give them the benefit of the doubt."

== Books ==
There are multiple books based on material first published in The Wire. Invisible Jukebox (1998), published by Quartet Books, collected entries from the recurring feature of the same name. For these features, an interviewer plays several pieces of music for a musician without identifying them, usually selecting tracks that the musician would be expected to know. The musician is challenged to guess the artist and title, as well as to comment on the music. Undercurrents: The Hidden Wiring of Modern Music (2002) was published by Continuum as part of the magazine's 20th anniversary; it collected a mix of new and previously published essays about important but overlooked developments in the history of modern music. The Wire Primers (2009), out on Verso, collected 19 essays that give introductions to various genres and artists. Savage Pencil Presents Trip or Squeek's Big Amplifier (2012) collected Savage Pencil cartoons from the preceding twelve years. Most recently, Epiphanies: Life-changing Encounters With Music (2015) anthologised essays from a recurring guest column about musical experiences that made a profound impact on the writer.

== See also ==
- Category:The Wire (magazine) writers
