= Samuel E. Vázquez =

Puerto Rican graffiti artist (born 1970)

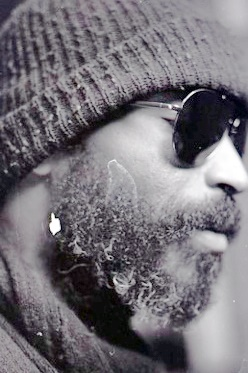
- Born: Samuel Enrique Vázquez Rivas; 1970 (age 55–56); San Juan, Puerto Rico
- Known for: Abstract Expressionist paintings, graffiti art
- Website: www.samuelevazquez.net

Samuel E. Vázquez, styled as Samuel E Vázquez (born Samuel Enrique Vázquez Rivas, 1970), was a participant of the New York City Subway graffiti art movement of the 1980s. Today, Vázquez works on abstract expressionist paintings.

== Life and career ==
Vázquez was born in San Juan, Puerto Rico, in 1970 to parents of African, Spanish, French, and Jewish descent. He learned to be disciplined from his father, who was in the military. His parents recognized his artistic inclination at the age of four and encouraged him to explore the arts. In 1979 the family moved to New York City where Samuel first became aware of the graffiti that covered the city's subways and walls. By 1983 Samuel began painting and writing the subways using the name "Brame." He is a member of numerous New York City graffiti crews. "He [Vázquez] was part of a generation that claimed their humanity by literally writing their own names on walls to keep from being dismissed." Vázquez was mentored by fellow graffiti artist Anthony "A-One" Clark, a collaborator of neo-expressionist painter Jean-Michel Basquiat. After the New York City subway graffiti era ended, Vázquez shifted his focus to furthering his education. He holds degrees from New York City College of Technology, part of the City University of New York (CUNY) system, and the Herron School of Art and Design, a division of Indiana University.

== Art ==
Vázquez's abstract paintings are rooted in his urban upbringing and often incorporate the spontaneous markings commonly found in large city walls and surfaces. "...Vázquez combines his past in a now extinct New York with painting to create abstract pieces that assault your mind with color and singular visual concepts."

Culture writer Karla D. Romero of the Spanish magazine Humanize wrote, "His work embodies an ancient art, with a fresh perspective and an overall comprehension of a seemingly fictional New York City, where youth took to the streets to create art, to tag their social message and connect with their city... If you are of the Picasso mindset, 'Bad artists copy, Good artists steal,' then you will probably hate Vázquez's work, not because he doesn't use a medium that is common, but because he does so in a way that is unique, organic and graceful... If you believe in originality and the force behind doing something unlike anyone else, then you'll love Vázquez's work. I think Dalí said it best, 'The first man to compare the cheeks of a young woman to a rose was obviously a poet; the first to repeat it was probably an idiot,' Vázquez is clearly a poet."

In 2013, Vázquez made a graffiti painting on the grounds of the Indianapolis Museum of Art (IMA). The invitation to paint at the museum was in conjunction with artist Ai Weiwei's According to What? exhibition at the IMA. Early in 2014, Vázquez was a guest panelist, at the Indianapolis Public Library Central Branch, for a screening of the documentary The Wrinkles of the City - La Havana, directed by artists JR and José Parlá.

Vázquez has also curated a number of art exhibitions, including 25 Above Water, (2005–2006, Marsh Gallery-Herron School of Art and Design, Indiana University, Indianapolis, Indiana), in support of the Hurricane Katrina and Hurricane Rita relief efforts, and In An Expression of the Inexpressible, (2009, Dean Johnson Gallery, Indianapolis, Indiana) an exhibition that explored the interaction between music and art. The exhibition's title was adapted from the song of the same title, In An Expression of the Inexpressible, (1998) with permission from the alternative rock band Blonde Redhead. The album cover for Black Devil Disco Club - Eight Oh Eight created by Non-Format in collaboration with Belgium artist Géraldine Georges was used as the exhibition's marketing image. Notable artists that have participated in Vázquez-curated exhibitions include Stefan Sagmeister, Non-Format, Karlssonwilker, Mike Mills, Hannah Waldron, Si Scott, Géraldine Georges, Mike Joyce/Stereotype Design NYC, Sara Haraigue, Yokoland, Jean Jullien, and Rick Valincenti/3st.

In 2016, Vázquez was featured on the podcast Obsessed With Design, where he spoke about his artistic path from the New York City subways to gallery walls.

To date Vázquez's paintings have been the subject of over 35 solo and group exhibitions at galleries and cultural institutions such as Clowes Memorial Hall of Butler University, the Madam Walker Legacy Center, the Indiana State Museum, the Herron and Marsh Galleries of Indiana University, and the Dean Johnson Gallery – all in Indianapolis – as well as the Beard Arts Center of Indiana Wesleyan University in Marion, Indiana, and the Grace Gallery in Brooklyn, New York City, among others.
