= Bad Rabbits =

American band

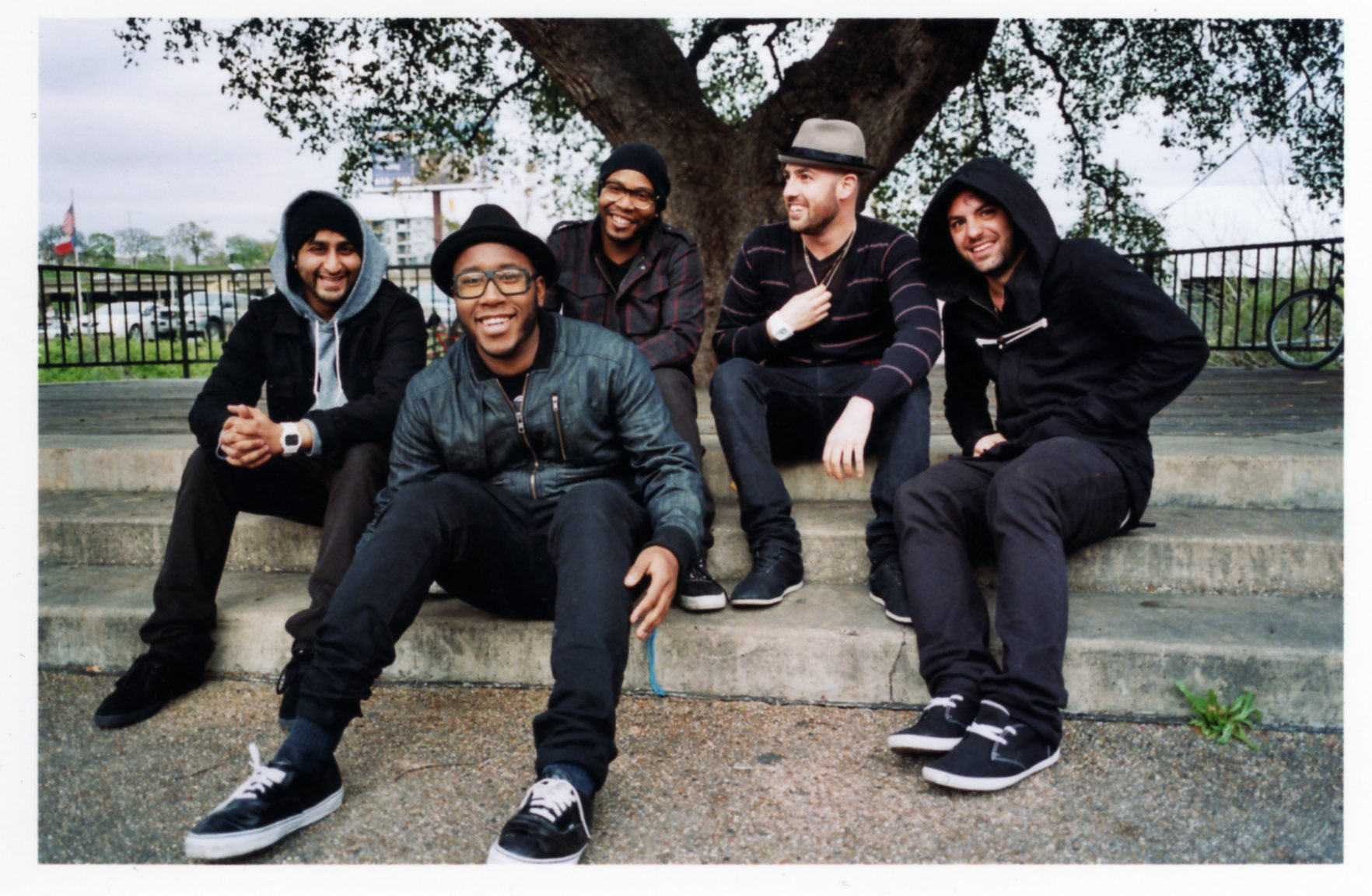

Background information
- Origin: Northampton, Massachusetts, United States
- Genres: Funk rock, post-hardcore, alternative rock, R&B
- Years active: 2007–present
- Spinoff of: The Eclectic Collective, Irepress
- Members: Fredua Boakye; Sheel Davé; Salim Akram; Graham Masser; Santiago Araujo
- Website: badrabbits.com

Bad Rabbits is an American band from Boston, Massachusetts, founded in September 2007. The band consists of Fredua Boakye (vocals), Sheel Davé (drums), Salim Akram (guitar), Graham Masser (bass), and Santiago Araujo (guitar). All five members of the band originally played in the Boston-based band The Eclectic Collective, which in 2007 they reworked and renamed Bad Rabbits. The band released a demo in 2008 entitled The Bad EP which was followed up by their debut EP, Stick Up Kids, in December 2009. Their first album American Love was released on May 14, 2013, and on July 19, 2014, Bad Rabbits released Dusted – an acoustic EP. They have won four Boston Music Awards, including Pop/R&B Live Artist of the Year in 2014. Bad Rabbits also won the 2010 Phoenix Music Poll Award for Most Downloaded Band. From 2007 to 2010, they performed as the backing band for rapper Slick Rick. They have been a part of five national tours, including the 2011 and 2014 Vans Warped Tour, the 2013 Don Broco Priorities UK tour, the 2014 Allen Stone US Tour and their own UK tour in 2014.

== Early history ==
The five members of Bad Rabbits first came together in 2002 while attending Northeastern University and Audio Institute in Boston, MA. Boakye and Akram were performing as a duo and their childhood friend, Davé was a member of experimental metal band Irepress. Masser & Araujo were playing in a jam band, covering Phish & the Grateful Dead songs. At the time Davé, Akram & Boakye started writing music for a new band. In need of more musicians to complete their band, a friend introduced Masser and Araujo to Davé at the YMCA dormitory on Northeastern's campus. The group performed their first show as The Eclectic Collective on January 16, 2003, at All Asia in Cambridge. There were various lineup changes which primarily included Akram, Boakye, Davé, Araujo, Masser, RP Thompson (keys), Geoff "DJ Special Blend" Ford, as well as singer Noni Kai on vocals, trumpet player and rapper Peter "Afrodzak" Shungu, and saxophonist Robert Oswald. After two independent album releases and a tour in the Fall of 2007 with artist Gavin Castleton, the group decided to call it quits.

Not happy with the direction The Eclectic Collective had taken, founder & drummer, Sheel Davé led the change of its name and overall direction.

Davé took the name, Bad Rabbits from one of Gavin Castleton’s songs, which the group performed while on tour with him.

== Career ==
In the fall of 2008, the band self-released a four-song demo titled The Bad EP. The EP contains the song "The Bad", which became the song now known as "She’s Bad".

In spring 2009, the band entered the studio with producer Jayson Michael Dezuzio to record their debut EP, Stick Up Kids. The album was completed in fall 2009 and released independently that December. The band also entered into a relationship with Boston-based online retailer Karmaloop.com, who distributed and promoted the album through their website. A remix compilation of the Stick Up Kids EP was released in the fall; it included remixes from Clinton Sparks, Crookers, Roxy Cottontail, Hot Pink Delorean, and Alex Suarez. Tracks on this release include "Booties", "Neverland", "Stick Up Kids", "Girl I'm Like Damn!" (featuring Travie McCoy of Gym Class Heroes), "She's Bad", "Advantage Me" and "Can't Back Down".

On May 14, 2013, the album American Love was released. It reached No. 1 on the iTunes R&B album chart and No. 35 iTunes album chart. The album also reached No. 10 on the Billboard Heatseeker Chart, No. 12 Billboard R&B Albums and No. 29 on the Billboard Hip-Hop/R&B Album Chart. The first single from American Love, "We Can Roll", is a one-sided 7" vinyl single, with the iconic "BR" logo hand-printed onto the blank B-side. Each copy came housed in a jacket that was hand screen printed with a 3D spot glitter and each record was individually numbered.

The band released three more albums; an acoustic album titled Dusted (July 9, 2014) and the albums American Nightmare (November 21, 2016) and Mimi (August 9, 2018).

Keyboardist RP Thompson plays on most of the band’s recordings but only plays live on rare occasion.

From 2011 to 2015, Ramon Narvaez, a longtime friend of the band and multi-instrumentalist began filling in live on bass as well as rhythm or lead guitar when necessary.

When the band parted ways with Araujo in the fall of 2015, Narvaez would take over his position as a touring member and would do so until early 2020. He would also contribute musically to both “Save Yourself” and “WWYD” off 2017’s American Nightmare.

In 2018, Masser would leave the band and would be replaced by Mike Landry in a touring capacity. Mike had been a fan of the band and a mutual friend of drum tech Brian Cauti.

In 2020, the band celebrated the 10-year anniversary of Stick Up Kids with sold-out shows in Boston, Los Angeles, and San Francisco.

In 2020, the founding and remaining members, Boakye, Akram & Davé formed their new record label, Coco Bvtter records and plan to release the next Bad Rabbits record in 2023.

== Members ==
- Fredua Boakye – vocals
- Sheel Davé – drums
- Salim Akram – guitar

== Discography ==
=== Albums ===
- American Love (2013, Bad Records, P-Vine Records, Enjoy the Ride Records)
- American Nightmare (2016, Mind Over Matter Records)
- Mimi (2018, Mind Over Matter Records)
- Garden Of Eden (2019)

=== Remix albums ===
- Stick Up Kids Remix (2011, self-released)

=== EPs ===
- The Bad (2008, self-released)
- Stick Up Kids (2009, self-released, Mind Over Matter Records reissue)
- Cover Sessions (2011, self-released)
- Dusted (2014)

=== Singles ===
- "Can't Fool Me" from American Love (2013)
- "We Can Roll" from American Love (2013)
- "Fall in Love" from American Love (2013)
- "Doin' It" from American Love (2013)
- "Dance with You" featuring Teddy Riley and Clinton Sparks (2013) – an extended version of the song is used in the music video
- "Better Days" (2014)
- "Feels Good" (2018)

=== Other songs ===
- "Stick Up Kids" (demo) (2008)
- "Advantage Me" featuring Brandon Wronski, from PacSun Summer Music Mix 2010 (2010)
- "Kassius Ohno Theme" featuring Florida Championship Wrestling Audio Team & Jim Johnston (2010, unreleased)
- "Booties" (Big Chocolate Remix) (2011)
- "Can't Back Down" (Blunt Sinatras Remix) from Turnt, Volume 1 (2011)
- "Way with Words" from Bad Rabbits SoundCloud (2015)
- "How High" from Bad Rabbits SoundCloud (2015)
- "Mysterious" from Bad Rabbits SoundCloud (2017)

=== Collaborations ===
- "Gangsta Party" featuring Ninjasonik from Cody B. Ware's Welcome Home (2011)
- "Sailboats" from Chuck Inglish's Wrkout (2011)
- "Made", as Bad Rabbits x Vince Staples, from Converse's Cons, Vol. 2 – EP (2011)

== Awards ==
Boston Music Awards

- 2010 – R&B/Pop Artist of the Year – WON
- 2013 – R&B/Pop Artist of the Year – WON
- 2013 – Artist of the Year – WON
- 2014 – R&B/Pop Artist of the Year – WON
- 2014 – Live Artist of the Year – WON

Phoenix Music Poll Awards

- 2010 – Most Downloaded Band – WON

== TV appearances ==
- Jimmy Kimmel Live!
  - Performed "Can’t Fool Me", "Fall in Love" and "We Can Roll" on May 18, 2013.
- The Late Late Show with Craig Ferguson
  - Performed "Can’t Fool Me" on May 31, 2013.
- The Arsenio Hall Show
  - Performed "Dance with You" and "We Can Roll" on Sept 24, 2013.
- Polartec Big Air at Fenway
  - Performed on February 11, 2016.

== Tours ==
2010

- Support for Foxy Shazam and Young Veins
- Support for Mike Posner and Far East Movement

2011

- Vans Warped Tour
- Support for Taking Back Sunday and The Maine

2013

- Karmaloop Verge Campus Tour supporting Kendrick Lamar and Steve Aoki
- American Love Headline Tour
- UK Tour supporting Don Broco

2014

- Vans Warped Tour
- UK Headline Tour
- Support for Allen Stone
