= Elliman =

Elliman is a surname. Notable people with the name include:

- Dave Elliman (1902–1995), Australian rules footballer
- Louis Elliman (1906–1965), Irish impresario and theatre manager
- Paul Elliman (born 1961), British artist and designer
- Yvonne Elliman (born 1951), American singer

== See also ==
- Douglas Elliman, largest brokerage in the New York Metropolitan area
- Yvonne Elliman (album), debut album by American pop music star Yvonne Elliman
