= The Wire 20 Years 1982–2002 =

Compilation album by Various artists
- Released: 18 November 2002
- Genre: Experimental music
- Length: 224:50 (3:44:50)
- Label: Mute
- Producer: Lenny Kaye

The Wire 20 Years 1982–2002 is a various artists compilation album. The 3-CD box set was released on Mute Records for the 20th anniversary of British music magazine The Wire. The tracks were selected by the magazine's publisher and former editor, Tony Herrington. It is now out of print. Andy Gill at The Independent named it one of the ten best box sets of the year.

== Track listing ==
Disc one
No.	Title	Artist	Length
1.	"The Wire"	Steve Lacy	5:12
2.	"Seguita"	Ennio Morricone with Gruppo di Improvvisazione Nuova Consonanza	3:12
3.	"Wrong Eye"	Coil	5:54
4.	"Egress (Excerpt)"	Hands To	4:11
5.	"Buried Dreams"	David Toop and Max Eastley	5:22
6.	"Tubby's Vengeance"	King Tubby and Vivian Jackson (Yabby You)	2:57
7.	"Don't Talk (Put Your Head on My Shoulder)"	Fennesz	4:08
8.	"M 5"	Derek Bailey	2:41
9.	"Cockfight / Trance in Paksabali and Kesiman / Gamelan Beleganjur"	Bali traditional musicians	5:30
10.	"Pygmäen"	Einstürzende Neubauten	1:20
11.	"After Rapidly Circling the Plaza (Excerpt)"	AMM	6:33
12.	"11,000 Volts"	Mars	3:31
13.	"Breathe Deep"	Cabaret Voltaire	5:16
14.	"The Death of the Composer Was in 1962"	Tony Conrad and Faust	3:12
15.	"Vandal"	Designer	5:13
16.	"Vandal"	Torture	2:57
17.	"Shenshema"	Fela Kuti	9:08
Total length:			76:17

Disc two
No.	Title	Artist	Length
1.	"Illistrum"	Art Ensemble of Chicago	8:13
2.	"Expressway to Yr Skull"	Sonic Youth	7:03
3.	"Salt"	Spring Heel Jack and the Blue Series Continuum	4:44
4.	"Paper Hats"	This Heat	5:58
5.	"Simple Headphone Mind"	Nurse With Wound and Stereolab	10:40
6.	"Rock 'N' Roll Station"	Jac Berrocal	4:41
7.	"Ancient Ethiopia"	Sun Ra and His Solar-Myth Arkestra	2:47
8.	"Jukebox Capriccio"	Christian Marclay	3:11
9.	"Williams Mix"	John Cage	5:42
10.	"Cathode #4: Soundcheck Version"	Otomo Yoshihide	5:22
11.	"Headphones"	Björk	5:40
12.	"I (Excerpt)"	Pauline Oliveros	9:43
Total length:			73:44

Disc three
No.	Title	Artist	Length
1.	"Satan Side"	Keith Hudson	2:14
2.	"Music For the Gift (Part I)"	Terry Riley	5:42
3.	"Silver Smoke of Dreams"	William S. Burroughs with Ian Sommerville	4:50
4.	"Rocket U.S.A."	Suicide	4:16
5.	"4.2"	Supersilent	9:08
6.	"Vaihe (Fön)"	Pan Sonic	4:46
7.	"Kebabträume"	Deutsch Amerikanische Freundschaft	3:32
8.	"Khalid of Space (Part 2 - Welcome)"	Larry Young	12:25
9.	"Players With Circuits"	David Behrman with Gordon Mumma	5:50
10.	"The Caution Appears (Part 5)"	Fushitsusha	4:39
11.	"Living Space"	John Coltrane with Alice Coltrane	10:26
12.	"Some Summer Day"	John Fahey	3:26
13.	"23 Minutes to Go"	Diamanda Galás	4:35
Total length:			75:49

== Personnel ==
- Tony Herrington – track selection, liner notes
- Tony Dixon – mastering
- Non-Format (Kjell Ekhorn and Jon Forss) – art direction, design, photography
