= Grüvis Malt =

- Origin: Providence, Rhode Island, United States
- Genres: Futurock
- Years active: 1995–2005
- Labels: Independent; Lakeshore Records
- Members: Gavin Castleton; Brendan Bell; Erik Nilsson; Scott McPhail; Justin Abene; Steve Geuting
- Past members: Saunder Jurriaans; Ethan Ruzzano; Steve Martinka; Marco Herrera; Brandon Clemmens; Josh Hutchins; Reed Wallsmith; Rich Hall

Grüvis Malt were an American six-piece band founded in Providence, Rhode Island in 1995. They have released seven full-length albums, one of them issued by the Lakeshore Entertainment subsidiary Lakeshore Records, and three EPs. The other albums were released independently under Grüvis Malt's self-run label, Integers Only.

Grüvis Malt are known for their blending of genres (progressive rock, hip hop, jazz, and funk) and intense song writing. They are the self-proclaimed founders of the "futurock" genre, which features a blending of irregular time signatures (like math rock), unconventional chord progressions, and abnormal song structure. Because of this blending of many genres of music, Grüvis Malt are sometimes called a "musician's band."

The group stopped touring in 2005, after the release of their last album, Maximum Unicorn, in order to pursue solo projects and higher profits.

== History ==
Grüvis Malt were started in March 1995 in Providence, Rhode Island by high school students Gavin Castleton (keyboards), Brendan Bell (vocals/percussion), Ethan Ruzzano (guitar), Marco Herrera (drums) and Steve Martinka (bass guitar). The band had its beginnings in experimenting with random time signatures and heavy noise. At the end of the summer, Castleton moved to Portland, Oregon.

Upon Gavin's return in 1996, Josh Hutchins (a.k.a. Johnny Longburns) joined the band as a turntablist and beatboxer, and Breakfast All Day, their first EP, was recorded at Diva Studios with David Stem. In 1997, Martinka and Hutchins both left the band. Brandon Clemmens replaced Martinka on the bass guitar and Rich Hall joined on percussion, and the six piece began writing the songs that would become the Fetus EP.

In early 1998, Saunder Jurriaans replaced Brandon Clemmens on bass guitar. Erik Nilsson left school to become a full-time saxophonist with the band, and Ethan doubled on trombone. With a full-fledged horn section, the band wrote songs for the album Sound Soldiers, while reworking the songs on Breakfast All Day and the Fetus EP. The result was Cromagnetic, considered by the band as more of a compilation than a full-fledged album. In 1999, Grüvis Malt released Sound Soldiers, an album many consider to be their musical "starting point". After rigorous regional touring throughout 1998 and 1999, Grüvis Malt went on a month-long tour around the US in 2000.

After the US tour, Ruzzano and Jurriaans resigned from the band and were replaced by Steve Geuting and Justin Abene respectively. Reed Wallsmith joined the band in 2001 on alto saxophone. The band began work on ...With the Spirit of a Traffic Jam..., their next full-length album (produced and recorded at Diva Studios on their own). DJ Chris Kilmore of the band Incubus, with whom they had played shows, DJ'd on 2 album tracks and one B-side, "Graduated". In spring of 2001 Reed left the band to return to his hometown of Portland, OR. In fall of 2001 the band signed with Lakeshore Records, a subsidiary of Lakeshore Entertainment. Throughout 2002 and 2003, Grüvis Malt toured to promote the album, which was released on March 28, 2003. (The album hit stores April 9). Relations with the label were strained when Lakeshore refused to give the band copies of the record to sell at their record release party and shows throughout their US tour. The band parted ways with the label later that year, citing their having never received royalties as a violation of contract.

In 2003, Grüvis Malt recorded Simon at Sound Station Seven (the last album recorded there before it closed) with engineer Rob Pemberton. In 2004, Gavin and Brenden began working on separate side projects. Directly after the release of Simon, Grüvis Malt stopped touring and began recording Maximum Unicorn in Justin Abene's Fall River studio. Maximum Unicorn was released in November 2005 on the Integers Only webstore, and no record release show was booked.

In 2006, Justin Abene, Gavin Castleton, and Brendan Bell formed Ebu Gogo and toured the US from 2006 to 2009 in support of their two self-released full-lengths: Chase Scenes 1-14 and Worlds.

Gavin Castleton has released several solo records and was a member of The Dear Hunter until 2021.

The members of Grüvis Malt always valued the integrity of the music more than the publicity they received for it; thus, they preferred to remain unsigned and advertised predominantly using a "grassroots" marketing scheme.

== Band line-up ==
- Gavin Castleton – Keyboard/Vocals
- Brendan Bell - Vocals/Percussions
- Erik Nilsson – Saxophone
- Scott McPhail – Drums
- Justin Abene - Bass Guitar
- Steve Geuting - Guitar

=== Past members ===
- Saunder Jurriaans - Bass Guitar
- Ethan Ruzzano - Guitar, Trombone
- Steve Martinka - Bass Guitar
- Brandon Clemmens - Bass Guitar
- Josh Hutchins (Johnny Longburns) - Turntables
- Reed Wallsmith - Saxophone
- Rich Hall - Percussion

== Discography ==
=== LPs ===
- Cromagnetic (Integers Only, 1998)
- Sound Soldiers (Integers Only, 1999)
- ...With the Spirit of a Traffic Jam... (Lakeshore Records, 2002)
- Simon (Integers Only, 2004)
- VISMAL - Volume Zero: Cover Girls (Integers Only, 2005)
- Maximum Unicorn (Integers Only, 2005)

=== EPs ===
- Breakfast All Day (Solid Pimpz LLC, 1996)
- Fetus EP (Solid Pimpz LLC, 1997)
- Backout Smiling (Integers Only, 2000)
- VISMAL - Volume 1: A Correspondence Course in Best Friendship (Integers Only, 2003)

== Tour credits ==
Grüvis Malt toured the United States several times from 1995-2004. During tours, Grüvis Malt would rarely play their newly released music, usually playing unreleased material or remixed material, "to keep fans on their toes." Some of the bands that they performed with include the following.

- Save Ferris, Red Hot Chili Peppers, Incubus, Pennywise, Mos Def, The Roots, Secret Chiefs 3, Ozomatli, G Love & Special Sauce, Luscious Jackson, Atmosphere, Buck 65, De La Soul, Sugarhill Gang, Wilco, Karl Denson, The Slip, Evil D, Rustic Overtones, Mike Doughty, Brother Ali, Common, Ray LaMontagne, 12 Rods, Black Moon, Maceo Parker, Marcy Playground, The Amazing Crowns, Custom, Fun Lovin' Criminals, Dropsession, Edon, 3rd Eye Blind, Zox, Grand Buffet, State Radio, John Scofield, The Slip, Karl Denson, Paranoid Social Club, Awol One, Sage Francis (as support and backup band), Facing New York, Monty Are I, Shootyz Groove, 2 Skinnee J's.

== Awards and recognition ==
- 1997 - #1 Unsigned Band - WBRU Listener Poll - winner
- 1998 - Rhode Island College Rock Hunt - Winner
- 1998 - #1 Unsigned Band - WBRU Listener Poll - winner
- 1998 - Best Breathrough Act - Providence Phoenix Best Music Poll - winner
- 1998 - WBRU Rock Hunt - finalist
- 1998 - Rhode Island College Rock Hunt - winner
- 1999 - Best Alternative Act - Providence Phoenix Best Music Poll - winner
- 2000 - Best Jam Act - Providence Phoenix Best Music Poll - nominated
- 2000 - Fourth Annual Jim Beam Rock Band Search - finalist
- 2001 - Jim Beam Rock Hunt - finalist
- 2001 - Best Category-defying Act - Providence Phoenix Best Music Poll - winner
- 2002 - Best Song - Providence Phoenix Best Music Poll - winner
- 2002 - Best Album - Providence Phoenix Best Music Poll - winner
