= Gavin Castleton =

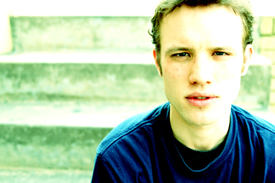
- Castleton in 2006

Background information
- Origin: Providence, Rhode Island, USA
- Years active: 1995–present
- Labels: Five One Inc., Integers Only, Hematoma Support Group
- Website: www.gavincastleton.com

Gavin Castleton is a musician/songwriter/producer from Providence, Rhode Island. Originally known for his work with Gruvis Malt as keyboardist and singer, Castleton has released nine full-length albums and seven EPs as a solo artist. He has also released two full-length albums with action-adventure rock trio Ebu Gogo and two records with Orlando-based drum 'n bass hip-hop group One Drop. Castleton currently resides in Portland, Oregon.

== History ==
Castleton is a founding member of Rhode Island band Gruvis Malt, with whom he has released five full-length albums as well as a number of various independently released EPs.

=== 2006–2009 ===
From 2006 to 2008 he recorded and toured in Ebu Gogo, releasing two full-length albums, Chase Scenes 1-14 and Worlds. The band consists of Castleton and two members of Gruvis Malt, Brendan Bell and Justin Abene, with Jonny Lingo drummer Chase Leonard sometimes sitting in for Bell on drums.

In 2006, Castleton collaborated with playwright Cyrus Leddy to release the bizarre spoken-word album Grace Land which chronicles the mundane life of Gary Tivoli, a clerk at a Staples store, including intimate details of his relationship with his girlfriend and his obsession with Seinfeld. Castleton performed the narration, which was adapted from a series of interviews that Leddy conducted with Tivoli.

Castleton has recorded and performed with several bands and musicians, including One Drop (with whom he recorded the Fortnightshift EP and One Drop's second full-length album, Of Love and Ambition), Paranoid Social Club, Club D'Elf, and Facing New York. He performed at the annual SXSW festival in 2007 and 2009, showcasing the Hospital Hymns EP and some material from Home.

In late 2007 he released A Bullet, A Lever A Key, the progressive hip hop EP that tells the story of an ever-deteriorating life in reverse-chronological order, beginning with his suicide in 2054 and ending backstage at a "present day" performance. His blog "The Great Consolidation" features entries from the future that expound on the storyline of A Bullet, A Lever, A Key and discuss his latest full-length album Home, the tale of a long-term love affair interrupted by a zombie apocalypse.

On Halloween 2008 the first single from Home, "Unparallel Rabbits" was released digitally along with b-side, Gruvis Malt's "Since 1968" remixed by The Overclock Orchestra. On January 12, the second single from the album, "Coffeelocks", was released digitally along with b-side, "Shell". It enjoyed much airplay on KCRW's Morning Becomes Eclectic (and lead to a live performance on the show in 2009). On February 13 the full album was released digitally, and on April 7 it was released in stores nationwide.

On October 12, 2009, Five One Inc. released The Random Anthems EP on iTunes. It contains three songs: Shell 2: Nephew of Shell (the sequel to Shell, produced by Zach Lipkins), Scared Scared Scared (previously released on the Japanese import of For the Love of Pete), and Hope is a Drug (produced by Overclock Orchestra). Hope is a Drug was Today's Top Tune at KCRW, and has enjoyed airplay on specialty radio shows around the country.

In Fall of 2009 he toured with a trio featuring Eduardo Torres on drums and Gray Robertson on bass, playing 67 self-booked shows criss-crossing the US. That tour also included a stint with Taking Back Sunday, Anberlin, and Fun, throughout which Castleton's trio was joined by members of Taking Back Sunday for the majority of his set.

=== 2010–2011 ===
On October 1, 2010, after a Kickstarter campaign, Gavin self-released Won Over Frequency, a collection of unreleased songs featuring Steve Choi, Matthew Fazzi, Keith Brush, Lex Land, Brandon Clemmens, Justin Abene, Steve Geuting, and several local Portland artists. Gavin posted a video of the album artwork-making process on his YouTube channel featuring the work of Aaron Nagel, Brendan Bell, Justin Muir, and Lorna Carman. In the Fall of 2010 the Castleton Trio toured to the east coast with Lex Land and Happy Body Slow Brain, who both joined him on stage throughout the show.

=== 2012–2015 ===
During the first half of 2012, Castleton focused mainly on releasing singles. Many were accompanied with a video, and were distributed via his blog, YouTube account, or various other media outlets. Some were related to his Won Over Frequency Kickstarter campaign, and were written to award certain individuals who made donations towards the completion of the album. On September 20, 2012, he performed live on Jimmy Fallon with the rapper Danny! and backed by the Roots.

Throughout 2013, Castleton kept a low profile. He performed live at SXSW (South by Southwest) Festival and released various singles in anticipation of his upcoming album.

On April 23, 2014, Castleton released a 16-song "mixtape" called #blessed, available for free download on his bandcamp page with the purchase of any piece of apparel. In May he did a two-week tour around New England with Happy Body Slow Brain to promote the record.

On October 11, 2014, Castleton released It Was the Worst of Times, It Was the Worst of Times, a five-song EP of "simple sad piano songs."

On December 25, 2014, Castleton released "Travelight," a narrative children's album inspired by The Little Prince, that featured songs written over the course of 10 years. It features Seth Castleton (Gavin's cousin) on cello, and Bob Castleton (Gavin's grandfather) as the narrator.

=== 2015–2017 ===
In the fall of 2015, Castleton toured as the keyboardist for Courtney Marie Andrews.

In October 2015, Castleton released the Halloween single "Grady," a "sonic prequel" to The Shining.

In 2016, Castleton joined The Dear Hunter on keyboards and backing vocals. The new lineup was premiered abroad, during the band's U.K. tour in March 2016. He released an exclusive 4-song EP called "The Punchline EP" in conjunction with a 2-month major market US tour supporting The Dear Hunter and Eisley.

From June 8 to July 1, 2017, Castleton combined forces with Rare Futures to tour the US as the supergroup "FutureCastle," playing songs from both artists' catalogs. On June 2, 2017, they released the FutureCastle EP on limited edition vinyl, featuring four cover songs (including Castleton's arrangements of Chicago's "If You Leave Me Now" and Hall and Oates' "Maneater").

=== 2018–present ===
On October 31, 2018, Castleton posted a lyric video for his Halloween single "I Choose You," inspired by the Teddy Perkins episode of Donald Glover's show Atlanta.

On September 10, 2019, Castleton released Weak Intl., a 5-song micro-EP of "corporate clap-backs," on digital streaming platforms and bandcamp.com. The collection of 1-minute rants were inspired from Castleton's experience working in the tech industry.

On October 16, 2019, Castleton released a #deathed, a compilation of his Halloween singles. He published a lyric video for his 2019 Halloween single, Pelle (a tribute to Ari Aster's horror/break-up film Midsommar).

On Nov 1, 2019, A Bullet, A Lever, A Key and Travelight were released on vinyl. For the month of November, Castleton performed select US dates as both the keyboardist and solo support act for The Dear Hunter.

On Dec 3, 2019, Castleton released the Red Poison EP, a collection of 5 songs penned by Castleton's step-daughter, Bloomer, over the course of two years (when she was aged 4 to 6 years old). The songs feature production and vocals by Castleton, as well as Bloomer's mother, Alexis Henry.

On Apr 23, 2020, Castleton released a full-length album, "Here You Go", on bandcamp.com.

On June 12, 2021, Castleton has left The Dear Hunter, citing being at a point in his life that he cannot "[contribute] the appropriate time, energy, and focus" that the "many amazing and ambitious TDH events and releases" would require.

On May 3, 2024, Castleton released a full-length album, "Pattern Breaker", on bandcamp.com and later on popular music-streaming services.

== Discography ==
=== Solo releases ===
- Dark Age (2004)
- Hypotenuse (2004)
- FortNightShift (EP) (2005)
- Grace Land (2006)
- Hospital Hymns (EP) (2007)
- For The Love of Pete (2007)
- A Bullet, A Lever, A Key (EP) (2007)
- Window 23 w/ Stateless (7") (2008)
- Home (2009)
- Random Anthems EP (2009)
- Covers (compilation) (2009)
- Won Over Frequency (2010)
- "Covers (extended edition)" (2013)
- "#blessed Mixtape" (2014)
- Travelight (EP) (2014)
- It Was the Worst of Times, It Was the Worst of Times (EP) (2014)
- The Punchline (EP) (2016)
- The FutureCastle EP w/ Rare Futures (2017)
- Weak Intl. (Micro-EP) (2019)
- #deathed (compilation) (2019)
- Here You Go (2020)
- Just My Imagination (Running Away with Me) (cover single) (2020)
- The Kingdom (single) (2020)
- Smith's Grove (Halloween single) (2022)
- Pattern Breaker (2024)

=== Full discography ===
A detailed list of every release Castleton has been a part of as either a songwriter, performer, engineer or producer.

Date	Performer	Title of release	Media	Role
1993	Subgenius	Subgenius	cassette	"engineering," vocals, keyboards, drums, graphic design
1995	Gruvis Malt	Emiquis Squerve Demo	cassette	keyboards, graphic design
1996	West Coast Groove Satellite	West Coast Groove Satellite	cassette	"engineering," "mixing," all composition, keyboards, vocals, graphic design
1996	West Coast Groove satellite	Funkin' Go Nuts	cassette	"engineering," "mixing," most composition, keyboards, vocals, graphic design
1996	Gruvis Malt	Breakfast All Day	cassette	production, mixing, keyboards, vocals, graphic design
1997	Gruvis Malt	Fetus EP	cassette	production, mixing, keyboards, vocals, graphic design
1998	Gruvis Malt	Cromagnetic	CD	(aside from credits of two cassettes that were reprinted) production, vocals, keyboards, graphic design
1999	Gruvis Malt	Sound Soldiers	CD	production, mixing, keyboards, samples, vocals, graphic design
1999	Flint	One Degree EP	CD	engineering, production, mixing, keyboards, guitar, bass, drums, samples, vocals, graphic design
2000	Gruvis Malt	Backout Smiling EP	CD	keyboards, vocals, graphic design
2001	Locale AM	Sounds of Spring	CD	vocals on track 3
2001	Grüvis Malt	3 Radio hits demo	CD	engineering, production, mixing, keyboards, vocals, drum sequencing, graphic design
2001	Keith Carini	Untitled	unreleased	engineering, mixing, keyboards
2002	Ethan	Principia EP	CD	vocals
2002	Brandon Clemmens	The Inconvincible	CD	engineering, mixing, "mastering," keyboards, graphic design
2002	Gruvis Malt	Promotional Interactive CD #1	CD	engineering, mixing, keyboards, vocals, flash programming
2002	Gruvis Malt	Promotional Interactive CD #2	CD	engineering, mixing, keyboards, vocals, flash programming
2002	Gruvis Malt	...With the Spirit of a Traffic Jam	CD	engineering, mixing, production, keyboards, vocals, percussion, sequencing, graphic design
2003	Vismal	Volume 1: A Correspondence Course in Best Friendship	CDR	engineering, mixing, "mastering," keyboards, vocals, sequencing, graphic design
2003	Sage Francis	Dead Poet Live Album	CD	keyboards
2004	Gruvis Malt	Simon	CD	keyboards, vocals, graphic design
2004	Gavin Castleton	Hypotenuse	CD	engineering, mixing, production, all composition, keyboards, drums, bass, guitar, cornet, mellophone, vocals, sequencing, graphic design
2004	Gavin Castleton	Dark Age	CD	engineering, mixing, production, all composition, keyboards, drums, bass, guitar, cornet, mellophone, vocals, sequencing, graphic design
2005	Madjkut	The Flint	CD	keys on tracks 7–9
2005	Gavin Castleton / One Drop	FortNightShift EP	CD	engineering, mixing, composition for tracks 1–4, keyboards, vocals, graphic design
2005	Johnny Bass	I Wish You Could Love Me	MP3	vocals
2005	Monty	The Red Shift	CD	guitar and bass engineering on tracks 2 and 4–8, keyboard production and sequencing on tracks 2, 5, 6, and 8
2005	Jonny Classic & The Classic Johns	Your New Favorite Record	CD	mixing, additional production, violin on track 6, assisted graphic design
2005	Sage Francis	Road Tested (2003–2005)	CD	keyboards
2005	Andrew Brown	Communal Abuse remix	digital	production, additional keyboards
2005	Ryan McCalmon	Come Home	CD	keyboards and additional production/arrangement on track 1, 3, 4, 5
2005	Gruvis Malt	Maximum Unicorn	CD	engineering, production, mixing, keyboards, vocals, string arrangements, sequencing, mellophone, cornet, guitar on track 6
2005	Vismal	Volume Zero: Cover Girls	CDR	mixing, "mastering," sequencing on track 5, production on track 6, vocals on tracks 2 and 5, keyboards on tracks 4, 6, 7, and 10, arrangement on track 1, 4–6, 10
2006	Ebu Gogo	Chase Scenes 1-14	CDR	keyboards, engineering, mixing (both with Justin Abene)
2006	Gavin Castleton & Cyrus Leddy	Grace Land	CD	vocals, engineering, production, keyboards, guitar (except track 8), sequencing, mixing
2007	Gavin Castleton	Hospital Hymns EP	CD	vocals, engineering, production, keyboards, string arrangements, bass, drums, guitar (except track 2 and 5), sequencing, mixing, graphic design
2007	Gavin Castleton	A Bullet, a Lever, a Key EP	CD, vinyl	vocals, production, keyboards, composition, additional percussion, sequencing, mixing (with Rob Pemberton), graphic design
2007	Gavin Castleton	For the Love of Pete	CD	vocals, production, keyboards, composition, sequencing, mixing, graphic design (with Jenny Lederer)
2008	One Drop	Of Love and Ambition	digital	additional engineering, production, keyboards, horn and vocal arrangement, sequencing and additional percussion, guitar on track 8 and 10
2008	Ebu Gogo	Worlds	CD	synthesizers
2008	Stateless feat. Gavin Castleton	"Window 23/The Great White Whale" 7"	vinyl & digital	vocals
2008	Gavin Castleton	"Unparallel Rabbits"/"Since 1968" Overclock Orchestra Remix	digital	vocals, composition, keyboards, sequencing, production, graphic design
2009	Gavin Castleton	"Coffeelocks"/"Shell" (produced by Zach Lipkins) (single)	digital	vocals, composition, keyboards, sequencing, production
2009	Gavin Castleton	Home	CD	vocals, composition, keyboards, sequencing, production, additional percussion
2009	Gavin Castleton	Random Anthems EP	digital	vocals, composition, keyboards, sequencing, production, guitar
2009	Gavin Castleton	Covers	CDR	vocals, arrangement, keyboards, sequencing, production, guitar, cornet, melophone
2010	Blak	Feast for a King	digital	composition, production, mixing, sequencing, keyboards, guitar
2010	Gavin Castleton	Won Over Frequency	CD	vocals, arrangement, keyboards, sequencing, production
2011	Gavin Castleton	"Swim Good" (Frank Ocean cover) (single)	digital	production, mixing, sequencing, vocal
2011	Gavin Castleton	"Diamonds" (featuring Lex Land) (single)	digital	vocals, arrangement, keyboards, sequencing, production
2011	Gavin Castleton	"Chameleon" (single)	digital	vocals, arrangement, keyboards, sequencing, production
2011	Blue Cranes	Oversea Orbits: Observatories Remixed	CD	"Maddie Mae" remix
2012	Danny!	Payback	digital	vocals
2012	Gavin Castleton	"Tangerines" (single)	digital	vocals, arrangement, keyboards, sequencing, production, mixing
2013	Will Star	"Better Tomorrow" (single)	digital	vocals
2013	Gavin Castleton	"Falling" (Twin Peaks Theme cover feat. Lex Land)	digital	arrangement, keyboards, sequencing, production, mixing
2014	Gavin Castleton	#blessed	CD	vocals, arrangement, keyboards, sequencing, production, mixing
2014	Gavin Castleton	"The Middle" (Jeffrey Martin cover)	digital	vocals, arrangement, sequencing, production, mixing
2014	Gavin Castleton	It Was the Worst of Times, It Was the Worst of Times EP	CD	vocals, arrangement, keyboards, sequencing, production, mixing
2014	Gavin Castleton	Travelight	digital, vinyl	vocals, arrangement, piano, production, mixing
2016	Gavin Castleton	The Punchline EP	CD	vocals, arrangement, keyboards, sequencing, production, mixing
2016	Rare Futures	This Is Your Brain on Love	CD, vinyl	vocals & keyboards on Track 10
2016	The Dear Hunter	Act V: Hymns with the Devil in Confessional	CD	vocals on "The Haves Have Naught", piano on "Mr. Usher (On His Way to Town)", additional synthesis on "A Beginning"
2017	FutureCastle	The FutureCastle EP	10" vinyl	vocals, arrangement, keyboards, sequencing, production, mixing
2017	The Dear Hunter	All Is as All Should Be EP	CD	keyboards, backing vocals
2017	The Archaeologist	Odysseys EP	CD	keyboards on track 7
2017	Gavin Castleton	"Guest" (single)	digital single	vocals, arrangement, keyboards, sequencing, production, mixing
2018	The Dear Hunter / Between the Buried and Me	Split EP	CD and 7" vinyl	keyboards
2018	Gavin Castleton	"I Choose You" (feat. Benny Hope & Teddy Perkins) (single)	digital	vocals, arrangement, keyboards, sequencing, production, mixing
2018	Bad Rabbits	"Mimi" (single)	digital/vinyl	lyrics, arrangement, keyboards, sequencing, production
2018	Bad Rabbits	"F on the J-O-B" (single)	digital/vinyl	lyrics, arrangement, keyboards, sequencing, production
2019	Gavin Castleton	Weak Intl.	digital	vocals, production, mixing, mastering
2019	Gavin Castleton	#deathed (compilation)	digital	vocals, arrangement, keyboards, sequencing, production, mixing
2019	Red Poison	self-titled EP	digital	vocals, arrangement, keyboards, sequencing, production, mixing
2020	Gavin Castleton	Here You Go	digital	vocals, arrangement, keyboards, sequencing, production, mixing
2020	Gavin Castleton	Just My Imagination (Running Away With Me) (cover)	digital	vocals, arrangement, keyboards, sequencing, production, mixing
2020	Gavin Castleton	The Kingdom (single)	digital	vocals, string arrangement, sequencing, production, mixing
2021	The Dear Hunter	The Indigo Child (single)	digital	keyboards, talkbox, background vocals, percussion sequencing
2021	Emodulari	Greatest Sewer (single)	digital	piano, hammond
2022	Gavin Castleton	Smith's Grove (Halloween single)	digital	vocals, arrangement, keyboards, sequencing, production, mixing
2022	Love by Numb3rs	Earth Needs a Moon	digital	keyboards
2023	The Dear Hunter	Act I: The Lake South, The River North (Live from Seattle)	vinyl/digital	vocals, keyboards
2023	Ku'on	New Game+	digital	Hammond organ, piano
2023	Bad Rabbits	In Love & Plane Crashes (single)	digital	lyrics, vocals arrangement sequencing
2024	Gavin Castleton	Pattern Breaker	digital	vocals, arrangement, keyboards, sequencing, production
