= Nigel Shafran =

British photographer (born 1964)

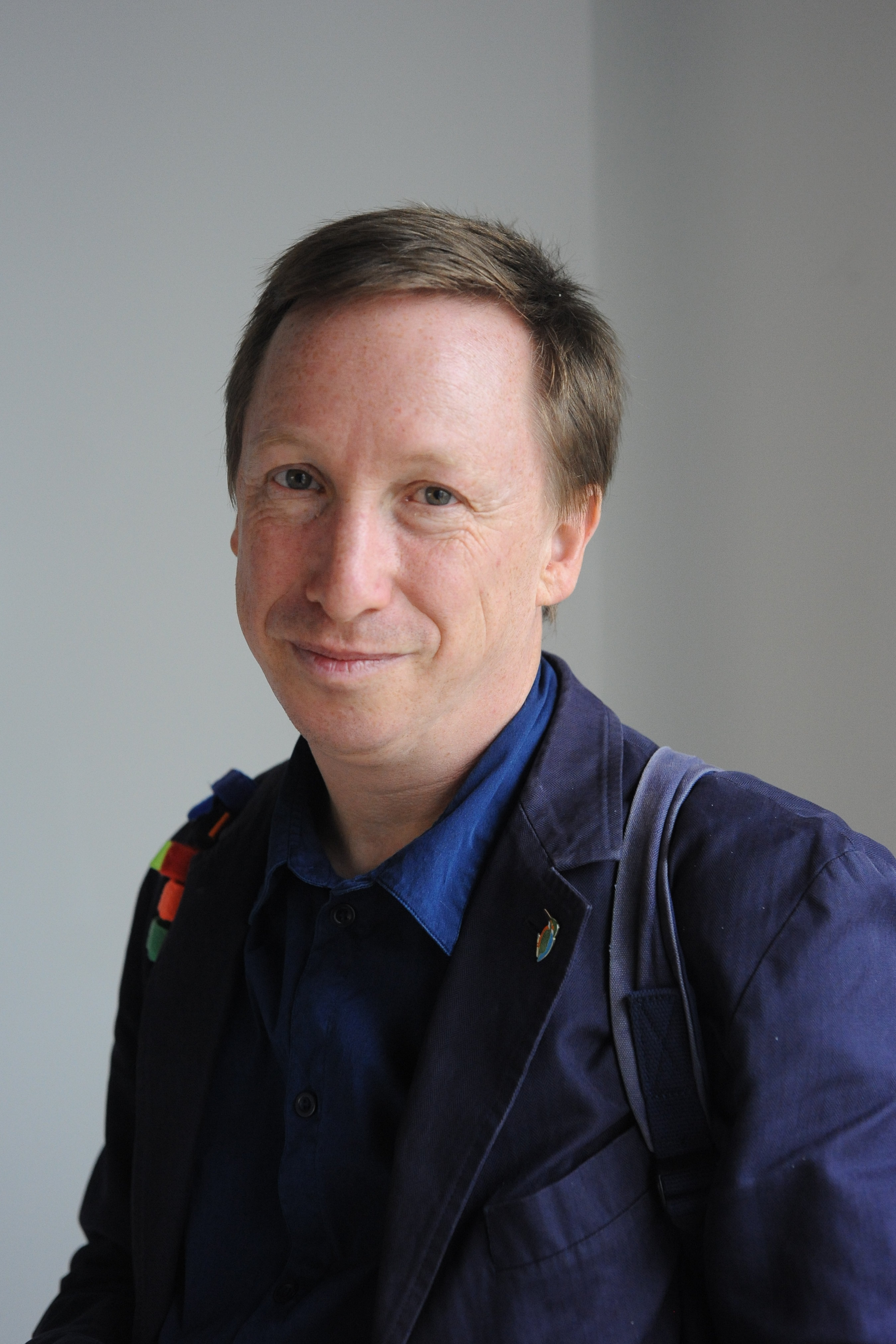
- Born: 1964 (age 61–62); United Kingdom
- Occupations: Photographer; artist
- Website: nigelshafran.com

Nigel Shafran (born 1964) is a British photographer and artist. His work has been exhibited at the Tate and the Victoria and Albert Museum. In the 1980s, before focusing on fine art photography, Shafran worked in fashion photography. He described his work as "a build-up of images, often in sequences. There is a connection between them all. Basically, I'm a one-trick pony: it's all life and death and that's it."

== Publications ==
- Ruthbook. Self-published, 1995. Supported by Focal Point Gallery. Edition of 600 copies.
- Dad's Office. Self-published, 1999. ISBN 978-0-9536289-0-2. Edition of 1000 copies.
- Edited Photographs: Photoworks Monograph. Brighton, Photoworks; Göttingen, Steidl: 2004. ISBN 978-3-88243-976-2. Photographs by Shafran. Edited by Celia Davies, with essays by Val Williams and Paul Elliman, and an interview with Shafran by Charlotte Cotton.
- Flowers for ______. London: Koenig, 2008. ISBN 978-3-86560-481-1. Edition of 750 copies.
- Ruth on the phone. Roma publications, 2012. ISBN 978-90-77459-76-8.
- Teenage Precinct Shoppers. Dashwood Books, 2013. Edition of 500 copies.
- Visitor Figures: Out-takes from the V&A Museum Annual Review 2012-13. Self-published, 2015. Edition of 350 copies.
- Dark Rooms. London: Mack, 2016. ISBN 978-1-910164-42-6. Co-edited by Liz Jobey. With texts by David Chandler and Paul Elliman.
- The People on the Streets. 2018.

== Solo exhibitions ==
- 2000: Photographs by Nigel Shafran, 1992-2000, Taka Ishi Gallery, Japan
- 2001: Washing Up 2000, Fig-1, London
- 2004: Nigel Shafran, MW projects, London
- 2008: Flowers for ______, Rencontres d'Arles, Arles, France
- 2010: Compost pictures, 2008-9, Charleston, Firle, East Sussex, UK

== Collections ==
- Victoria and Albert Museum, London
- Arts Council England
