= Stateless (Stateless album) =

Studio album by Stateless
- Released: 16 July 2007
- Recorded: Rockfield Studios
- Length: 47:08
- Label: !K7
- Producer: Jim Abbiss, Stateless

Stateless chronology
The Bloodstream EP (2005)	Stateless (2007)	Matilda (2011)

Singles from Stateless
- 1. "Exit" Released: 14 May 2007; 2. "Prism #1" Released: 30 July 2007; 3. "Bloodstream" Released: 29 October 2007

Professional ratings
Review scores
Source	Rating
ARTISTdirect	3/5 stars
The Beat Surrender	5/5 stars
Gigwise	3.5/5 stars
Inthenews.co.uk	9/10 stars
JIVEmagazine	5/5 stars
Sputnikmusic	4/5 stars
Whisperin & Hollerin	10/10 stars

Stateless is the self-titled and debut studio album by English musical group Stateless, released on 16 July 2007 on German electronica label !K7. The album includes besides newly written and recorded songs, all tracks previously released on The Bloodstream EP (2005) and debut-single "Down Here" (2004). The tracks "Exit", "Prism #1" and "Bloodstream" were released as singles promoting the album.

The artwork for the album and singles was created by Non-Format.

The song "Bloodstream" was used in the first season finale of the American TV show The Vampire Diaries and in the Season 4 finale of the American TV show The Blacklist.

== Track listing ==
All lyrics are written by Chris James; all music is composed by Chris James, kidkanevil, Rod Buchanan-Dunlop, James Sturdy, Jon Taylor unless noted otherwise

No.	Title	Producer(s)	Length
1.	"Prism #1"	Jim Abbiss, Stateless	4:17
2.	"Exit"	Abbiss, Stateless	3:44
3.	"Bloodstream"	Stateless	5:12
4.	"This Language" (featuring Lateef the Truthspeaker) (Written and performed by James, kidkanevil, Buchanan-Dunlop, Levin, Percival, Daumont. Rap written by Lateef the Truthspeaker)	Stateless	5:11
5.	"Down Here"	Abbiss, Stateless	4:08
6.	"Radiokiller" (Written by James, kidkanevil, Buchanan-Dunlop, Sturdy, Taylor, Wilmington and performed by James, kidkanevil, Buchanan-Dunlop, Taylor, Levin)	Stateless	4:01
7.	"Running Out"	Abbiss, Stateless	4:34
8.	"Crash" (Written and performed by James, kidkanevil, Buchanan-Dunlop, Levin, Percival)	Stateless	4:47
9.	"Bluetrace"	Abbiss, Stateless	4:58
10.	"Inscape"	Abbiss, Stateless	6:14
Total length:			47:08

== Release history ==
Region	Date	Label	Format	Catalog
Worldwide	16 July 2007	!K7 records	CD	!K7214CD
