= Simon (album) =

Studio album by Grüvis Malt
- Released: 2004
- Genre: Progressive rock, jazz-funk, Hip hop musichHip hop
- Length: 41:40
- Label: Integers Only
- Producer: Gruvis Malt

Grüvis Malt chronology
| ...With the Spirit of a Traffic Jam... (2002) | Simon (2004) | Maximum Unicorn (2005) |

Simon is an album by Grüvis Malt. It was released by Integers Only, an independent self-run label managed by Gruvis Malt founder Gavin Castleton, in 2004.

== Track listing ==
1. "Ark" – 4:16
2. "A Great Work of Fiction" – 7:16
3. "What Ladder?" – 2:06
4. "Safety Train" – 3:56
5. "The Fists of Protocol" – 3:32
6. "Water Closet" – 4:26
7. "Some Sweet Nothingness" – 3:16
8. "B612" – 4:16
9. "The Heart Transplant You Can Afford" – 4:11
10. "Exit Strategy" – 4:32
