= Cromagnetic =

Studio album by Gruvis Malt
- Released: 1998
- Genre: Alternative rock
- Label: Independent

Gruvis Malt chronology
Fetus (1997)	Cromagnetic (1998)	Sound Soldiers (1999)

Cromagnetic is an album produced by the American band Grüvis Malt. It was released independently in 1998.

== Track listing ==
1. "Maple Syrup... French Toast"
2. "Rubix Do"
3. "Adidas"
4. "Space Invasion"
5. "Cozmic"
6. "Ninja Gil
7. "Wax On" (radio edit)
8. "The Ticket"
9. "Canyoodigit"
10. "Wax Off" (remixed nuts)
11. "Neck Protection" (Rubix Redo) live at the Beachcomber
12. "PM live on 95.5 WBRU"
