= Sound Soldiers =

Studio album by Gruvis Malt
- Released: 1999
- Genre: Progressive rock, jazz-funk, hip hop
- Length: 64:14
- Label: Integers Only
- Producer: Gruvis Malt

Gruvis Malt chronology
| Cromagnetic (1998) | Sound Soldiers (1999) | Backout Smiling (2000) |

Sound Soldiers is an album by Gruvis Malt. It was released by Integers Only in 1999.

== Track listing ==
1. "Volume" - 3:46
2. "Dub / Powersnake" (live) - 5:26
3. "Casual" - 4:19
4. "Ninja Goon / Mischief" (live) - 6:00
5. "The Sticky" - 7:22
6. "Fi8ure" - 2:46
7. "Mr. Mickfield & the Skeletones / Twism" - 5:51
8. "The Break In (live)" - 5:10
9. "Yes, It Hurts... / The Facts (live)" - 5:24
10. "Lumas / Invisible Teeth" - 5:15
11. "No Fighting / .... Renegade Z" - 12:58
