= Stateless (band) =

English electronic band

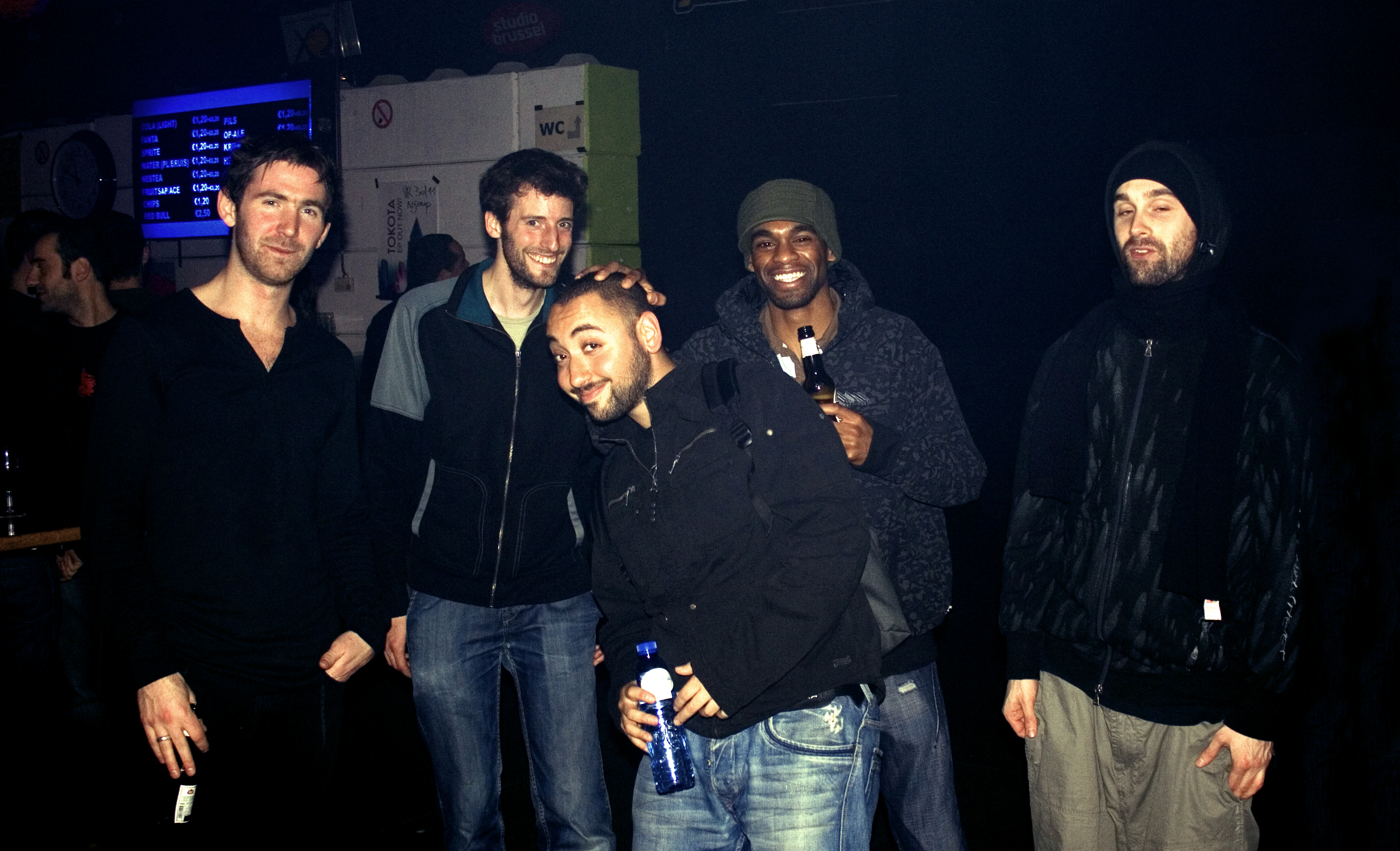
- Stateless in 2007 (left to right): Chris James, Rod Buchanan-Dunlop, David Levin, Justin Percival, kidkanevil

Background information
- Origin: Leeds, West Yorkshire, England
- Genres: Electronic, alternative rock, trip hop
- Years active: 2003–2015
- Labels: Ninja Tune (2010–2011) !K7 (2006–2010); Regal/Parlophone (2005); Sony Music (2004)
- Past members: Chris James kidkanevil Justin Percival; David Levin; James Sturdy; Jon Taylor; Rod Buchanan-Dunlop
- Website: ninjatune.net/artist/stateless

Stateless was an English electronic band based in Leeds and London. The group most recently comprised Chris James (vocals, keyboards, guitars), kidkanevil (turntables, sampling, programming), Justin Percival (bass guitar, vocals) and David Levin (drums).

Founded in 2002, Stateless signed a recording contract with Sony Music and released their first single "Down Here" in 2004 and a four-track EP The Bloodstream EP was released on Regal Recordings in 2005.

In 2006, Stateless changed in line-up and signed with !K7 Records. A single, "Exit", was released in 2007, followed by their self-titled debut album Stateless. Two other singles were later released: "Prism No. 1" and "Bloodstream".

The group toured throughout the UK and Europe in 2007 and 2008, playing both live concerts and acoustic showcases, promoting the album, and debuting material for their second album. In 2008, "Window 23/The Great White Whale" was released as an online single.

In 2010, the band signed with independent label Ninja Tune, on which their eleven-track second album Matilda was released on 21 February, 2011. The album included two pre-released singles: "Ariel" from 22 November, 2010 and "Assassinations" released on 14 February 2011.

On 19 September 2011, another EP, I'm On Fire, was released with the original version featuring Shara Worden and including remixes from Blue Daisy and Slugabed, a new song called "Blue Fire" featuring Amenta, and a string-quartet version of "Bloodstream".

Stateless has been inactive since releasing the crowdfunded EP Sixfold Symmetry in 2015.

== History ==
=== Formation and early years (2002–2004) ===
Stateless met in Leeds in 2002. Chris James, James Sturdy, and Jon Taylor had played in rock bands together for several years. When realising this more traditional style did not offer them the musical challenge they were looking for, they began to expand their musical tastes and influences to more sample based electronica and hip hop. For a while they ruled out the use of guitars when writing, trying to take their sound into a new direction. The interest in hip hop brought in DJ kidkanevil, who they heard at a hip hop club night in Leeds. James met Rod Buchanan-Dunlop, a Scot, at Leeds Metropolitan University on the first day of their Creative Music and Sound Technology course in the Leeds Met School of Technology. Buchanan-Dunlop then came into the band as the programmer and Stateless became a five-piece.

In February 2003 they released their first demo including demo versions of the songs "Exit" and "Prism No. 1", which they recorded at Leeds Met School of Technology studio. They sent in the demo to BBC Radio 1's show OneMusic early in 2003. Two months after the demo went online, "Exit" was played on Colin Murray’s evening show, as part of "Famous For Fifteen Seconds". Receiving high online vote ratings for their songs, OneMusic users voted them in the top ten on Steve Lamacq's demo section. "Prism No. 1" eventually made it to One Music's July "Unsigned list" as 1 of 6 bands selected nationwide and was voted to Radio 1 Playlist's C-List for a further two weeks. This earned the band interest from several management companies, independent and major labels including Virgin subsidiary Radiate and Sony Music.

=== Record deal and The Bloodstream EP (2004–2006) ===
They teamed up with manager Martin Hall of Sanctuary Artist Management (Groove Armada, Manic Street Preachers) and in 2004 they signed with Sony Music for a five-album record deal. They recorded for six weeks with producer Jim Abbiss (Kasabian, Arctic Monkeys) at the renowned Rockfield Studios in Monmouth. Their debut single "Down Here" was released on 3 April 2004 as a limited edition CD single and 7" vinyl, with 1,000 of each format made available. The single was backed with a live studio session recording of "Horizon" as B-side and a promotional music video was published coinciding the release. A new version of "Prism No. 1" was made available as a free download from the band's website. Further in 2004 they played among others at Homelands festival, the New Bands stage at V Festival and supported Kosheen on their UK tour. The demo version of the song "Exit" was included in the soundtrack for the video game Driv3r (2004) and its standalone album release. When Sony merged with BMG, their contract with the Sony Music label terminated. Stateless lost their record deal but James stated in 2007 it "wasn’t much of a blow to us, it was a bit of a relief."

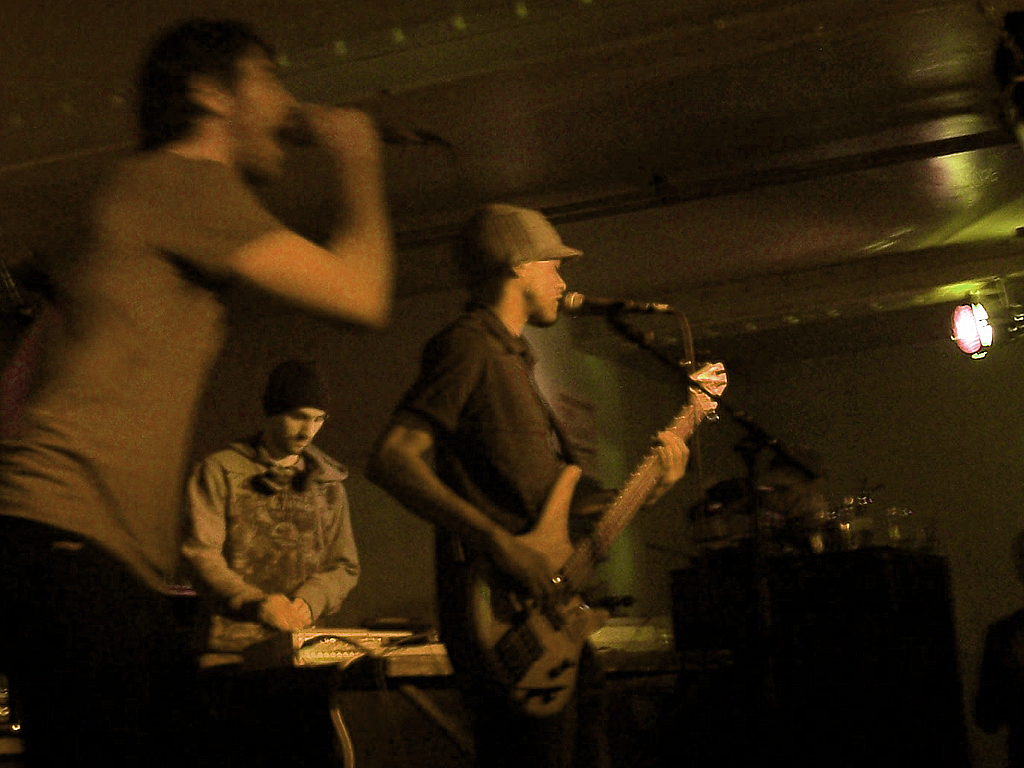
James, kidkanevil and Percival in concert with Stateless in 2007

A compilation called The Studio Sessions with live and unmixed studio versions of the songs "Down Here", "Horizon" and "Running Out", recorded between November 2003 and March 2004, was made available as a free download on the bands' official website, alongside a video directed by kidkanevil. In April 2005, Stateless raised £1280 for Amnesty International by organising a live music event, held on 30 April at Leeds Metropolitan Students' Union, a night jointly organised by Stateless and the Events Department at Leeds Metropolitan University. Leeds Met provided the venue and promotional material free of charge so that the full £5 ticket price could be donated to Amnesty.

On 25 July 2005 Stateless released The Bloodstream EP as a 10" EP and CD on Regal, a subsidiary of Parlophone (EMI). The EP contains four songs, including a reworked version of "Exit". While recording with Stateless, Abbiss was also working with American DJ Shadow on an Unkle album. He passed several Stateless tracks on to Shadow who became a fan, stating their EP was "As close to perfection as I've heard in a long time". Several months later, Shadow invited vocalist James in June 2005 to co-write and sing songs for his new album. Shadow met James in London, gave him three demos and a week to write as much as he could, lyrically, and met him at the end of that week in the studio. The collaboration resulted in the songs "Erase You" and "You Made It" that were featured on DJ Shadow's 2006 album The Outsider. James joined him as guest vocalist on his 2006 world tour to perform the songs live, playing 90 live shows in 17 countries. In November 2006 Stateless played 14 shows as Shadow's support act on his UK tour, after they were joined by David Levin (drums) and Justin Percival (bass guitar, backing vocals) in early 2006 when James Sturdy (drums, piano, string arrangements) and Jon Taylor (bass guitar, keyboards, guitar) parted with the band. James had already been mates with Levin and Percival for years, since they were about 13 years old and played together in various rock, metal, funk and soul bands when they were at high school.

=== New record label and Stateless (2006–2008) ===
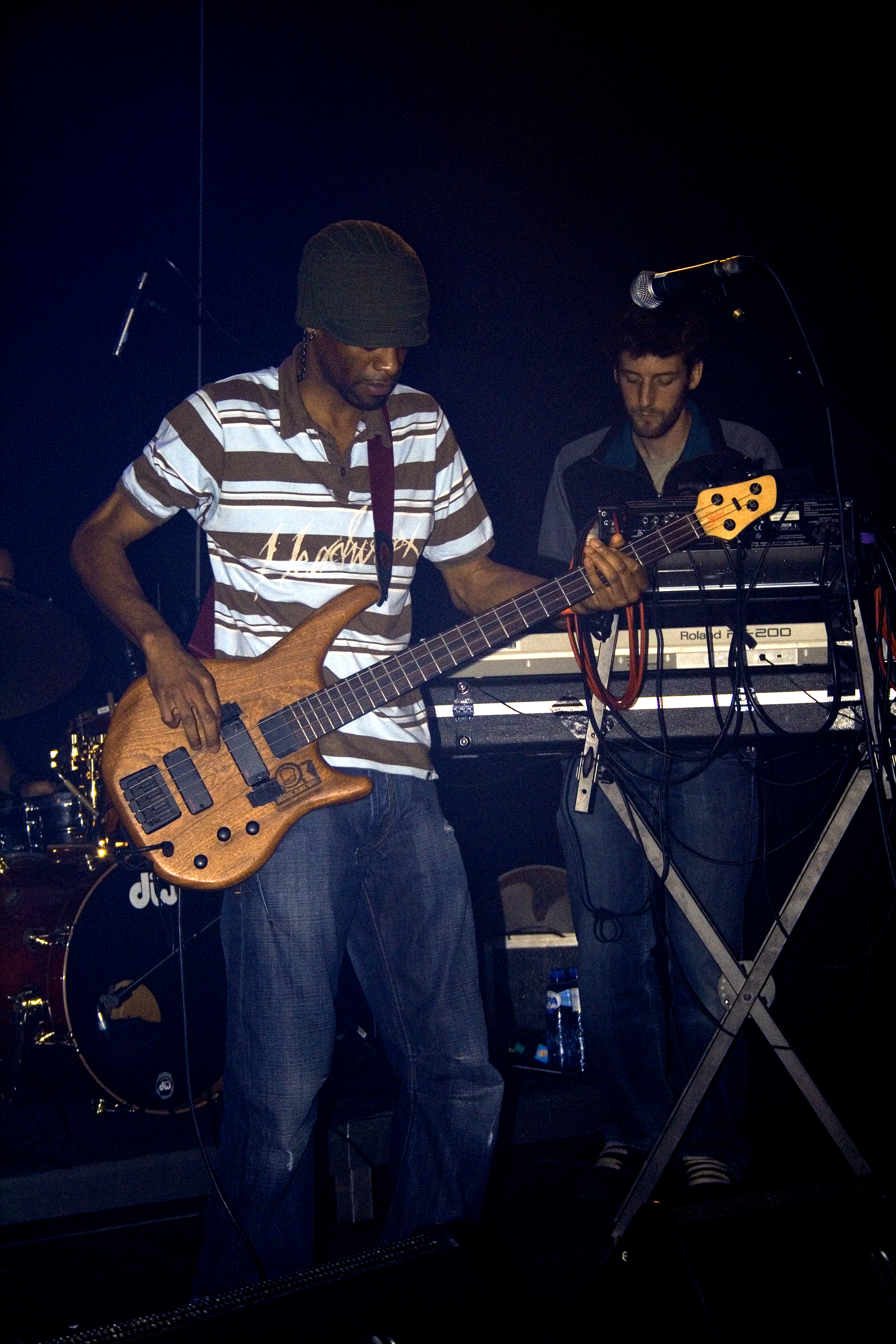
Percival and Buchanan-Dunlop in concert with Stateless in 2007

Stateless signed a new record deal with Berlin-based electronica label !K7 Records in November 2006. Single "Exit" was released as a 7" single 14 May 2007, backed with b-side "Hurricane". Their self-titled debut album Stateless was released worldwide on CD on 16 July 2007. Two thirds of the album was recorded and co-produced with Jim Abiss and includes all tracks previously released on The Bloodstream EP and debut-single "Down Here". They recorded and produced the final third of the album themselves; half of the record eventually being recorded at Rockfield Studios and half at their home studio in Leeds. Further in July they released the single "Prism No. 1" as a CD single with b-side "Lose Myself", a track exclusive to this release, and as a 12" with remixes from Prince Language and a rework from kidkanevil as "Prism No. 2". The "Prism No. 1" music video was nominated on mtvU's "The Freshmen". Third and final single taken from the album "Bloodstream" was released 29 October 2007 again as a 12" with remixes, this time from Henrik Schwarz and Pilooski, and as CD single holding the same remixes. To coincide with the single's release, a promotional music video was released as well.

The album has been receiving airplay on BBC Radio 1 and BBC 6 Music with the former's Zane Lowe playing singles "Bloodstream", "Prism No. 1" and album track "This Language". The latter featuring a contribution from American hip hop artist Lateef the Truthspeaker. The Artwork for both the album and its accompanying singles was created by London-based design team Non-Format. The single "Exit" was featured on the CSI: NY episode "Down the Rabbit Hole" in 2007. "Bloodstream" was featured in the 2008 film "Colpo d'occhio" by Italian actor and director Sergio Rubini, the 2009 American crime drama CSI: Miami episode "Flight Risk" and in the fourth season finale of the American TV show The Blacklist. A remixed and digitally remastered version with new piano parts of "Bloodstream" was also featured in the season 1 finale of the American hit television series The Vampire Diaries. The single "Bloodstream" would also be used in the soundtrack of the 2010 HBO Adaptation of the novel 'Bloodletting and Miraculous Cures'.

In 2006 a collaboration with American singer–songwriter and musician Gavin Castleton on lead vocals, resulted in the single "Window 23/The Great White Whale". They hooked up with Gavin through the internet and initially planned to do a split EP. They would do 2 tracks with Castleton remixing 2 of his own tracks and James writing vocals over them and 2 tracks with Stateless remixing 2 of their tracks and Castleton writing vocals over them. Eventually only the latter two were finished so they decided on the single format with vocals from Castleton on both tracks with "Window 23" being a remix of Stateless' song "Exit". The single was ready for release in 2006–2007 but release was postponed due to promotional restrictions at that time, set by their newly signed record company !K7, whose main priority was the promotion of their debut album and singles. The single was eventually released as a 7" and a digital package including a new acoustic song "Wade In" on 20 July 2008 on First Word Excursions, the sister label to Leeds-based independent label First Word Records. The latter being also home to kidkanevil as a solo artist, on which he released three albums to date.

While releasing their debut on !K7, they already started writing new material for a second album. In the autumn of 2007 and 2008 Stateless played venues including festivals and several acoustic sets, throughout the UK and across Europe in countries as Germany, the Netherlands, Belgium, France, Italy, Spain and Austria among others. Newly written songs as "Junior" and "Whiter Than Snow" for an upcoming album already received their live debut during the tour. In March 2008 they were to play their first gig across the Atlantic at the SXSW music festival in Austin, Texas, but had to cancel eventually.

=== Matilda (2008–2011) ===
New material was written and debuted at several one-off live performances and acoustic showcases throughout 2008. Recording of the new album started in September 2008 at Strongroom 33 Studios in East London. In February 2009 all songs were written and "Wade In" was made available as a free download on the band's MySpace page. A demo of the new album's intro was posted to their MySpace for a free listen as well. In April 2009, it was stated that 13 songs were written and recorded for their then still untitled second studio album. In the following months, they were mixed with a release eventually expected in early 2010. Although the full album was leaked online as early as October 2009. While taking a short break from mixing the upcoming album, Stateless embarked on a small acoustic tour in the Netherlands in June 2009, playing four locations, which they repeated in late October 2009 with another 4 Dutch acoustic showcases.

With a new website still under construction, the band's official Myspace was used as the single instrument for communication whilst the new album was being recorded and mixed. In late November 2009 it was announced on their Myspace-page that mixing of the new album was almost complete and was due for release in the first half of 2010. Buchanan-Dunlop (programming, live FX, keyboards) opted out of the band in December 2009 to pursue a new career, leaving only James and kidkanevil left from the original line-up and thus leaving Stateless a four-piece. In early February 2010, the band announced again through their Myspace blog, that mixing of the album was finished and that Stateless was to be back on the scene from autumn 2010 with the release of new material in sight as well as a brand new electronic live show. In addition it was announced James would be playing three stripped down solo acoustic shows in London with two in March and one in April and May 2010.

After signing with independent label Ninja Tune in 2010, Stateless released their first new single "Ariel" on 22 November 2010 followed by "Assassinations" on 14 February 2011. Their eleven track second album Matilda was eventually released on 21 February 2011 on both 2CD which includes an instrumental version of the album and 2LP. The digital release that accompanied the physical media included a bonus track called "Matilda" as well.

Stateless tracked and engineered the record themselves and teamed up with Damian Taylor (Björk, The Prodigy) to help produce and mix the album. Taylor provided electronic elements to the album as well. Furthermore, the album features contributions from the Balanescu String Quartet, DJ Shadow and vocals by Shara Worden (My Brightest Diamond) on the track "I'm on Fire".

The song "Miles to Go" was added to the video game Sleeping Dogs, where it was played on the Ninja Tune Radio. This was not the version that incorporated Chris James' vocals, but rather an instrumental version. Stateless played the HMV Next Big Thing festival in February 2011, followed by a small European tour, playing venues in The Netherlands, Switzerland, Italy, France and the UK among others.

== Musical style ==
=== Style and main influences ===
"Exit" (2004)
A sample of the song "Exit" chosen as the first single from Stateless (2007) demonstrates Stateless' blend of hip hop and rock: turntables, samplers, electronic elements go together with more traditional musical instruments as bass guitar and drums.

Stateless musical style is often described as a cross between Radiohead and DJ Shadow, and is reminiscent of bands such as Portishead, Coldplay, UNKLE and Massive Attack. Growing up, they were influenced by the Britpop movement and various guitar-oriented bands. Coming from a more traditional rock background, Stateless became heavily influenced by electronic, dance, hip hop and trip hop music. It was planned from the start not to be a guitar oriented band. They transitioned from playing guitars to incorporating turntables and samplers as instruments in a traditional band setup along with conventional instruments like keyboards, bass guitar and drums to create their sound.

Their blend of several musical styles and many diverse influences makes it challenging to classify them into one particular music genre or scene. They say they try not to restrict themselves to one type of music or try to fit into any scene. This creative approach in making music is according to Levin directly reflected in their name: "Musically we’re stateless, we don’t belong to any particular scene." James states their name reflects where they belong creatively: "It mainly means; Freedom. We want to be free from barriers, borders and any restrictions really." and that it is "reflecting our feelings about the way we make music. No boundaries, no pigeon-holes, no rules."

They state to have drawn their musical style from various styles of music ranging from classical music to psychedelic rock, dancehall reggae to hip hop and electronic music from Warp Records and similar labels. They cite their eclectic music tastes as a primary influence. They are also particularly influenced by Radiohead, DJ Shadow, Massive Attack, Autechre, Björk and Aphex Twin. James' vocal style and in particular his falsetto, has often been compared to that of singers as Thom Yorke of Radiohead, Jeff Buckley and sometimes even mistaken for Chris Martin of Coldplay. However, James distances himself from these comparisons, stating, "I've been singing all of my life. I never want to base my sound around any other vocalist and I certainly don't ever want to sound exactly like someone else." He also cites Nina Simone, Jeff Buckley, Otis Redding, and rap music vocals as notable influences.

=== Songwriting and lyrics ===
While James is the main songwriter and lyricist, all of the band members participate in writing music. Percival also contributed lyrics for second album Matilda. The band has said that songwriting usually begins with James at piano or one member programming a beat. They state to be very beat-oriented and take a lot of time figuring out the rhythmic foundations when writing music.

The band aimed to demonstrate variety in the lyrics on their self-titled debut album, a fact expanded upon by James: "Some songs are inspired by dreams, fantasizing, blurring the lines between reality and fantasy. This Language is an anti-war song, Exit is just an explosion and Bluetrace is trippy, with the second half like a primal scream. We just wanted to make a lot of noise!" In regards to their second album, the band aimed for an increased sense of maturity and self-awareness, and wanted to focus less on "break-ups and such things" and more on "longing, searching, loving, life, death, magic, lust and forgiveness," according to James. "We've also developed our relationships off the stage as well. This album was so much fun because it was like five best mates playing around in a studio."

== Discography ==
Stateless discography
- Studio albums: 2
- Extended plays: 3
- Singles: 7
- Music videos: 4

=== Studio albums ===
Year	Details
2007	Stateless: Released: 16 July 2007; Label: !K7; Format: CD
2011	Matilda: Release: 21 February 2011; Label: Ninja Tune; Formats: 2CD, 2LP, Digital

=== Extended plays ===
Year	Details
2005	The Bloodstream EP: Released: 25 July 2005; Label: Regal/Parlophone; Formats: 10", CD
2011	I'm On Fire EP: Released: 19 September 2011; Label: Ninja Tune; Formats: Promo CD, digital
2015	Sixfold Symmetry: Released: 7 August 2015; Label: Self-released; Formats: Digital

=== Singles ===
Year	Date	Single	Album	Label	Format(s)
2004	5 April	"Down Here"	Stateless	Sony Music	7", CDS
2007	14 May	"Exit"	Stateless	!K7	7"
2007	30 July	"Prism No. 1"	Stateless	!K7	12", CDS
2007	29 October	"Bloodstream"	Stateless	!K7	12", CDS
2008	20 July	"Window 23/Great White Whale" (feat. Gavin Castleton)	Single-only	First Word Excursions	7"
2010	22 November	"Ariel"	Matilda	Ninja Tune	Digital
2011	14 February	"Assassinations"	Matilda	Ninja Tune	Digital

=== Music videos ===
Year	Title	Director
2004	"Down Here"	Ben Ib
2007	"Prism No. 1"	Mo Stoebe
2007	"Bloodstream"	Mox
2010	"Ariel"	Field
