= The Eclectic Collective =

The Eclectic Collective was a crossover band from Boston, Massachusetts. Members include Dua Boayke (vocals), Salim Akram (guitar), Sheel Dave (drums), RP Thompson (keyboards), Graham Masser (bass), Special Blend (turntables), Santi Araujo (guitar), AfroDZak (trumpet/rap vocals), Rob Oswald (saxophone), and Noni Kai (vocals). The group released two albums, but many reviewers have complained that the quality of the band's recorded material was not up to the standard of their live shows.

Time Flies is the name of The Eclectic Collective's ten-song debut album. The Boston Phoenix described the band as "(peppering) the disc with the musical equivalent of exclamation points".
