= The Bloodstream EP =

EP by Stateless
- Released: 25 July 2005
- Recorded: Rockfield Studios
- Length: 19:47
- Label: Regal/Parlophone
- Producer: Jim Abbiss, Stateless

Stateless chronology
The Bloodstream EP (2005)	Stateless (2007)

The Bloodstream EP is the debut EP by the English alternative dance band Stateless.

== Track listing ==
All lyrics are written by Chris James; all music is composed by Chris James, kidkanevil, Rod Buchanan-Dunlop, James Sturdy, Jon Taylor.

No.	Title	Producer(s)	Length
1.	"Bloodstream"	Stateless	5:13
2.	"Exit"	Jim Abbiss, Stateless	3:38
3.	"Inscape"	Abbiss, Stateless	5:59
4.	"Bluetrace"	Stateless	4:57
Total length:			19:47
