= Year-in-review =

Annual publication highlighting events of the year

Wikipedia year-in-review 2014

A year-in-review is any sort of annual publication that covers the events of the past year from the perspective of the contributors to the publication. Years-in-review are often intended to highlight the highs and lows of the events which occurred throughout the year, and often include select works published during the year which are considered by the editors of the year-in-review to be the most memorable works of the year. Years-in-review are often used to list "Top Ten" lists voted upon by hired critics and reviewers of other media.

On broadcast media, years-in-review (also called "Countdowns") are segments of regular series or annual specials which offer mini-documentaries summarizing the highs and lows of the prior year.

In the 2020s, many popular websites, inspired by the success of Spotify Wrapped, began offering personalized years-in-review to their users.

== Non-entertainment ==
Outside of strictly-news and entertainment-oriented media, the term "year-in-review" can also apply to any statistical internal overview of an organization's performance in comparison to prior years of operation.
