= Matilda (album) =

Studio album by Stateless
- Released: 21 February 2011
- Genre: Electronica; alternative rock; trip hop
- Length: 49:05
- Label: Ninja Tune
- Producer: Damian Taylor

Stateless chronology
Stateless (2007)	Matilda (2011)

Singles from Matilda
- 1. "Ariel" Released: 15 November 2010; 2. "Assassinations" Released: 14 February 2011

Professional ratings
Aggregate scores
Source	Rating
Metacritic	75/100
Review scores
Source	Rating
AllMusic	3.5/5 stars
BBC Music	positive
Sputnikmusic	4.0/5

Matilda is the second studio album by English band Stateless, released on 21 February 2011 through Ninja Tune. The physical album included two CDs; the second disc containing an instrumental version of the album. The album was also released as a 2LP set. The digital release that accompanied the physical CD included a bonus track called "Matilda".

== Critical reception ==
Rick Anderson of AllMusic gave the album 3.5 out of 5 stars, writing: "The band's sophomore debut tempts fate with a nearly 30-second fade-in (you may think you have a defective disc on your hands, but wait for it), then takes off into a crazy welter of power ballad, electro-glitch, dubstep, atonal, acoustic-based, waltz-funk weirdness that occasionally gets tiring but rarely stops being interesting." Although feeling that "Ballad of NGB", "Song for the Outsider" and "Junior" should have been separated in the track listing due to their similarities ("mixtures of strings, thudding beats embroidered with clicky and glitchy percussion sounds, and soulful vocals that are sometimes crooned and sometimes only half-sung"), he concluded that "everything else [...] is pretty intensely great."

Mike Diver of BBC Music reviewed the album mostly positively, judging that the album does not "set a tone that's wholly maintained – and that's both the beauty and the irritation of Matilda. It's an album that tries to do too much in too little time, splitting itself into two halves of static'n'bass and strings'n'sighs, the midpoint dividing line a gentle instrumental called (appropriately) 'Red Sea', which loops itself beautifully like a lost passage from the Riceboy Sleeps LP."

== Track listing ==
All lyrics are written by Chris James except "Visions" (lyrics by Justin Percival) and "I Shall Not Complain" (lyrics by James and Percival).

No.	Title	Writer(s)	Length
1.	"Curtain Call"	James, Percival	6:14
2.	"Ariel"	James, Percival, Roberts	3:33
3.	"Miles to Go"	James, Percival, Roberts	4:23
4.	"Visions"	Percival, James, Roberts	2:58
5.	"Assassinations"	James, Percival, Roberts, Levin, Buchanan-Dunlop	4:10
6.	"Red Sea"	James, Taylor	1:59
7.	"I'm On Fire" (featuring vocals from Shara Worden)	James, Worden	5:20
8.	"Ballad of NGB" (with Balanescu Quartet)	James	3:28
9.	"Song for the Outsider" (with Balanescu Quartet)	James, Taylor, Wood	5:15
10.	"Junior" (with Balanescu Quartet)	James, Percival	4:37
11.	"I Shall Not Complain"	James, Percival, Roberts, Levin	7:08
12.	"Matilda" (bonus track)	James, Percival	2:09
Total length:			51:14
