= Paul Elliman =

British artist and designer

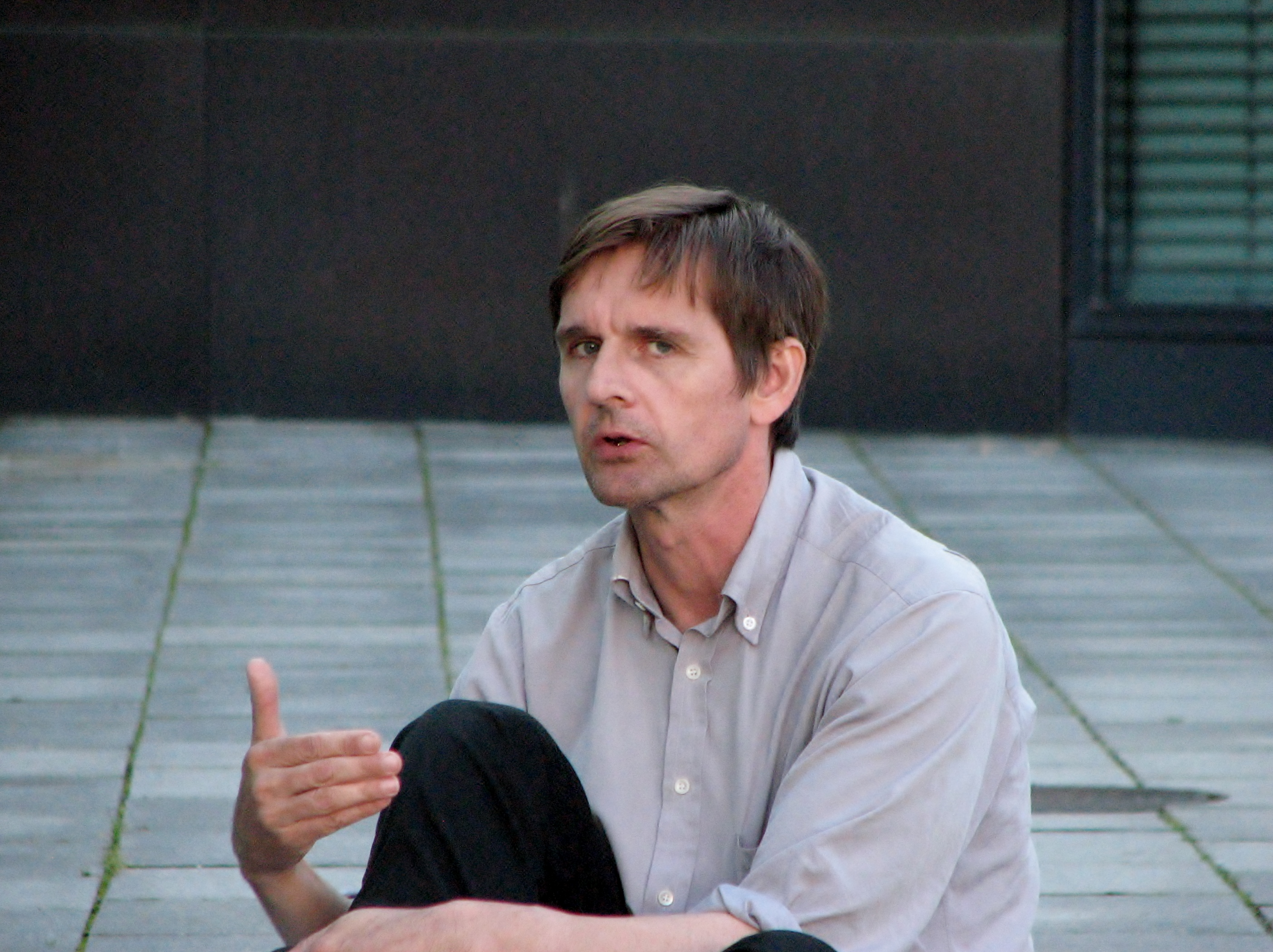
Paul Elliman

Paul Elliman (born 1961) is a British artist and designer based in London. His work combines an interest in typography and the human voice, often referring to forms of audio signage that mediate a relationship between them. His typeface Found Fount (a.k.a. Bits) is an ongoing collection of found ‘typography’ drawn from objects and industrial debris in which no letter-form is repeated.

Elliman's work explores the instrumentalisation of the human voice as a form of typography, engaging the voice in many of its social and technological guises, imitating other languages and the random sounds of the city. This includes the non-verbal messages conveyed by emergency vehicle sirens, radio transmissions and the muted acoustics of architectural spaces.

He has exhibited in the Institute of Contemporary Arts and Tate Modern in London, the New Museum and Moma (Ecstatic Alphabets, 2012) in New York, APAP in Anyang, South Korea, and Kunsthalle Basel. In 2009, his project "Sirens Taken for Wonders" was commissioned for the New York biennial Performa09. The project took the form of a radio discussion about the coded language of emergency vehicle sirens, as well as a series of siren-walks through the city.

In 2010, he contributed a series of whistled versions of bird song transcriptions by Olivier Messiaen for the show We Were Exuberant and Still Had Hope, at Marres Centre for Contemporary Art, Maastricht.

Elliman is a visiting critic at the Yale School of Art, New Haven, and a thesis supervisor at the Werkplaats Typografie in Arnhem, Netherlands.
