= Non-Format =

English graphic design team

- Industry: Graphic design
- Founded: (2000)
- Founder: Kjell Ekhorn, Jon Forss
- Headquarters: Oslo, Norway and Minneapolis, USA
- Website: www.non-format.com

Non-Format's design for the logo of The New York Times Magazine

Non-Format is a contemporary London-based Anglo-Scandinavian graphic design team specialising in design projects for the publishing and music industries. The firm was founded by Kjell Ekhorn and Jon Forss in 2000. They have worked for The Leaf Label and also closely with Lo Recordings, whom they have designed a vast majority of well over 60 releases with. They created artwork for Stateless for both their album and singles. They are also responsible for the recent complete redesign and art direction of the monthly British music magazine The Wire.
