= Maud Sulter =

Scottish photographer and writer (1960–2008)

- Self-portrait (cropped)
- Born: 19 September 1960; Glasgow, Scotland
- Died: 27 February 2008 (aged 47); Dumfries, Scotland
- Education: University of Derby
- Occupations: Artist, photographer, writer and curator
- Notable work: As a Blackwoman (1985)
- Children: 3, Ama, Efia and Alexander

Maud Sulter (19 September 1960 – 27 February 2008) was a Scottish contemporary fine artist, photographer, writer, educator, feminist, cultural historian, and curator of Ghanaian heritage. She began her career as a writer and poet, becoming a visual artist not long afterwards. By the end of 1985 she had shown her artwork in three exhibitions and her first collection of poetry had been published. Sulter was known for her collaborations with other Black feminist scholars and activists, capturing the lives of Black people in Europe. She was a champion of the African-American sculptor Edmonia Lewis, and was fascinated by the Haitian-born French performer Jeanne Duval.

== Early life and education ==
Born on 19 September 1960 in Glasgow, Scotland, to a Scottish mother and a Ghanaian father, Maud Sulter attained a master's degree in Photographic Studies from the University of Derby. Her maternal grandfather had been an amateur photographer.

== Sexuality ==
In Sulter's Call and Response, she raised the topic of "the finest" and radical artists in London at the time identified as lesbians. Sulter noted that lesbian-identifying women typically went unspoken, then said: "I sensed a danger there, a danger that pulled me back from the brink of desire, the desire to know myself truly, and it took time to resolve the need to confront the danger head on." Sulter wrote of her poetry: "The central body of my poetic work is unequivocally the love poetry which is addressed to both genders."

== Career ==
=== Art, photography, poetry ===
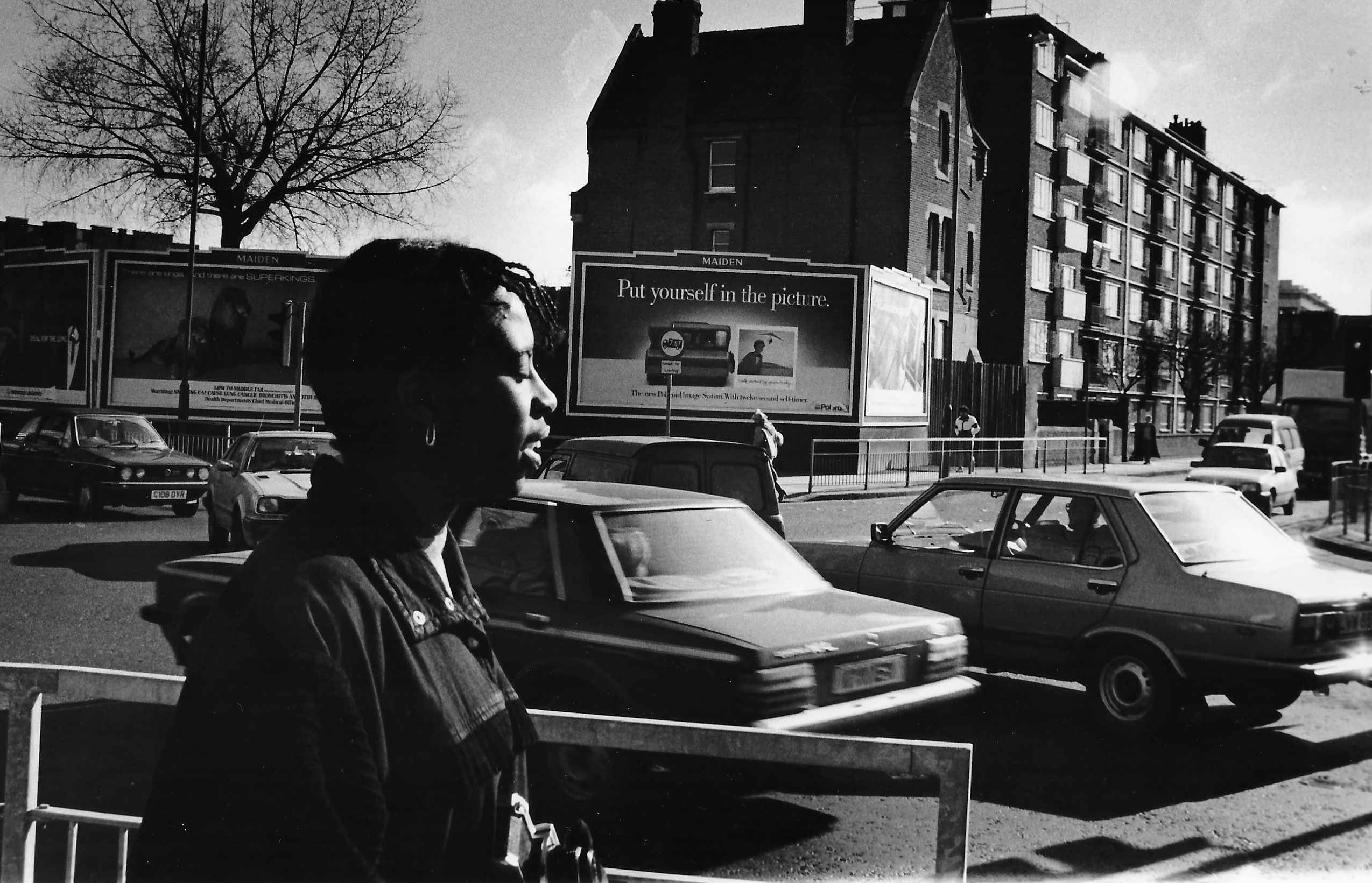
Photo for the exhibit Testimony: Three Blackwomen Photographers: Brenda Agard, Ingrid Pollard, Maud Sulter at Camerawork London.

Sulter participated in The Thin Black Line exhibition, curated by Lubaina Himid at the ICA in London in 1985. The exhibition displayed the art of Black and Asian women artists, re-centring the visibility of Black and Asian art in the British art scene. Sulter and Himid worked closely together on projects, curating and exhibiting their work together. Maud Sulter worked across photography, film, installation, collage and photomontage, sound and performance. Her work typically referenced historical and mythical subjects. Her photography was exhibited across the UK and internationally, including at the Victoria and Albert Museum in 1987, the Johannesburg Biennale (1995), and the Scottish National Portrait Gallery in 2003. She received a number of awards and residencies, among them the British Telecom New Contemporaries Award 1990 and the Momart Fellowship at Tate Liverpool, also in 1990.

As well as writing about art history and curating many exhibitions, Sulter was a poet and playwright. Her publications works include the poetry collections As a Blackwoman (1985; her poem of the same title won the Vera Bell Prize from ACER, the Afro-Caribbean Education Resource, the previous year); Zabat: Poetics of a Family Tree (1989); and Sekhmet: A Decade or So of Poems (2005). Her play, Service to Empire (2002), was inspired by the background of former Ghana head of state Jerry Rawlings. Two poems by Sulter are accessible online: "Gone But Not Forgotten" and "If Leaving You". Sulter's writings are available at the Scottish Poetry Library in Edinburgh, Glasgow Women's Library, the Stuart Hall Library, London, Poetry Society, London, Tate Library, London, and many other libraries.

Sulter was Principal Lecturer in Fine Art at Manchester Metropolitan University, from 1992 to 1994. lectured at a number of other English universities, and curated her own and other artists' work at British galleries since the mid-1980s, including at The People's Gallery in London, Tate Liverpool, Touchstones Rochdale, Street Level Photoworks in Glasgow, with Himid at the Elbow Room in London and at her own gallery, Rich Women of Zurich in London.

=== Art works ===
==== Sphinx ====
Sphinx was Sulter's first major series of photographs. This series of nine black and white photographs shot in The Gambia (Harris Museum and Art Gallery Preston) was first exhibited at Sulter's solo exhibition at The Black Art Gallery in September 1987. The exhibition brochure includes a poem and statements and her manifesto: "We the women will fight... We the women will win."

==== Zabat ====
Maud Sulter defined "Zabat" as "a sacred dance performed by groups of thirteen", "an occasion of power", possibly the origin of witches sabbat, "Blackwomen's rite of passage". In this series of nine large-scale cibachrome photographs, contemporary black women artists, musicians and writers pose as ancient muses. Each portrait represented a different muse of Greek mythology. Sulter wrote a series of prose poems for each muse, titled "Zabat Narratives".

==== Syrcas ====
An art series named in Welsh "Syrcas" (English translation: Circus) was produced by Sulter in 1993, and is about reviving the forgotten history of black Europeans during the Holocaust and their genocide. It includes a fictional character related to the historical background of her piece created by Sulter named Monique. Sulter created a complementary poem called "Blood Money", which has been republished in English. You can access this poem by clicking this link. This series consists of a 16-work photomontage and is presented in five subdivided sets in close proximity. The photomontage artworks were created on top of postcards with landscapes on them and multiple layers of different images collaged. This work has been in an exhibition in the Chapelle de la Charité d'Arles, in Arles, France, in 2016. To view these works you can click this link and view pp. 3–5.

==== Hysteria ====
Created by Sulter in 1991 on a Momart residency at Tate Liverpool, Hysteria, according to the artist's accompanying text, "a tells the story of a 19th-century Blackwoman artist who sails from the Americas to Europe to seek fame and fortune as a sculptor. Having achieved a successful career, she disappears." Hysteria was inspired by the life and career of Edmonia Lewis, a sculptor of African-American and Chippewa heritage. This series of black-and-white and colour photographs includes eight portraits, four pairs of still lives, each pair representing the seasons, and engraved marble plaques, initially arranged around a massive piece of marble. The central character, modelled by Sulter, is the artist Hysteria. The portrait photographs represent figures in Hysteria's social and artistic circles. Sitters include Bernardine Evaristo, Lubaina Himid, Delta Streete and musician Miles Ofuso-Danso. First exhibited at Tate Liverpool, Hysteria travelled to Rochdale, Street Level Photoworks and the Royal Festival Hall, 1991–92. To view the pieces of this exhibition click this link.

==== Significant Others ====
A series created by Sulter in 1993 includes nine large-scale photographs mounted in wooden frames, with annotations for each image. The photographs in this exhibition were enlargements of her family's photo archive resembling her Scottish and Ghanaian heritage. Sulter appears in four of the images as a child and her growing up, semblance of her identity.

==== Les Bijoux ====
Produced in 2002 as large-format colour Polaroid prints and named after a poem of the same name by Charles Baudelaire inspired the piece. Sulter's ideals of this poem inspired her to portray herself in the photos with passion and emotion- opposing the "common view" on this piece as sexualized. This exhibition is a series of close-up self-portraits of Sulter as a character inspired by Jeanne Duval (muse to Baudelaire). The purpose of this work is to raise awareness about African and European cultures throughout history.

==== Poetry in Motion ====
A mixed-media piece created in 1985 and meant as a social commentary on the 20th century, this work outlined the struggles and effects of racism that African women faced during this time. Several of Sulter's poems from As a Blackwoman were included in these mixed-media collages. Poetry in Motion was exhibited in 1985 at the Institute of Contemporary Arts in London and curated by Lubaina Himid.

==== Twa Blak Wimmin ====
Twa Blak Wimmin ("Two Black Women"), created by Sulter in 1997, was made "to recognise a more historical link between Europe and Africa." The title alludes to older Scots language and the story of historical Scottish women, "Blak Margaret" and "Blak Elene".

==== Jeanne Duval: A Melodrama I–IV ====
Inspired by poetry written by Jeanne Duval and her way of writing "which explore[d] her sensuality, sensuality and ethnicity..." This work was created in 1994, after multiple other works inspired by Duval, such as Zabat and Les Bijoux. Sulter had a "visual fascination with Jeanne Duval" since 1988, which "willed" her to create a piece more specific to Duval. This series of four photocollages features a portrait photographer Nadar, who was close with Duval. Sulter also published a book in relation to this piece, titled Jeanne Duval: A Melodrama, which can be accessed by clicking here. This was exhibited at National Galleries of Scotland, Edinburgh, in 2003.

=== Blackwomen's Creativity Project ===
Sulter worked with Sheba Feminist Publishers' collective, starting in 1982. As the collective's only Black woman writer at the time, Sulter recognized an increasing need for writing tailored to Black women. She co-founded the Blackwomen's Creativity Project in the early 1980s with Ingrid Pollard. The magazine created a variety of content ranging from "hair braiding, poetry and performance". She created her own publishing imprint, Urban Fox Press, releasing a new edition of her first collection of poetry, As a Blackwoman, along with her second poetry collection, Zabat: Poetics of a Family Tree, both in 1989.

== Death and legacy ==
Sulter died in 2008, aged 47, after a long illness. She was survived by her mother, Elsie, as well as her two daughters and son, Ama, Efia and Alexander.

Her work created coalitions between Black feminist and lesbian groups. Through collaborations with Black women artists, writers and photographers across the world, Sulter successfully brought awareness to the histories and continued presence of Black women figures.

Sulter's work is held in a number of collections, including Birmingham Museum and Art Gallery, the Victoria and Albert Museum, Arts Council Collection, the British Council, McManus Dundee, Glasgow Museums, Tate, City Art Centre, Edinburgh, Women's Art Collection, Cambridge, Touchstones Rochdale, National Galleries of Scotland, Boswell Collection, St Andrews University, Harris Museum and Art Gallery, Leeds University Art Gallery, Inverness Museum and Art Gallery, the Scottish Parliament Collection, and the Government Art Collection.

In 2011–2012, her work was shown at Tate Britain, London, in the exhibition Thin Black Line(s), which was a re-staging of the seminal 1986 exhibition The Thin Black Line that was held at London's Institute of Contemporary Arts .

In 2015, Street Level Photoworks Glasgow staged a major exhibition, entitled Maud Sulter: Passion, to showcase her work and achievement, especially in photography and photomontage.Her portraits of 10 pre-eminent Scottish poets were displayed at Hillhead Library, Glasgow. Maud Sulter: Passion travelled to the Impressions Gallery, Bradford, in 2016. During 2016, Sulter's series of Syrcas photomontages was exhibited at Autograph ABP, and at Arles Photography Festival in the Chapelle de la Charité d'Arles, both curated by Autograph ABP director Mark Sealy.

In 2017, two muses from Zabat (Calliope: the muse of epic poetry, and Terpsichore: the muse of dance) were shown at the Walker Gallery as part of the largest LGBTQ+ art exhibition in the UK, Coming Out: Sexuality, Gender, and Identity. Recent exhibitions include: Sarah Maldoror: Tricontinental Cinema, Paris, 2021 and Sulter: Centre of the Frame, Cambridge and Rochdale, 2021–22.

== Exhibitions ==
=== Solo exhibitions ===
Solo exhibitions
Date	Name	Location	Notes
1987	Sphinx^{x} – A Black Photographic Herstory	The Black Art Gallery, London, England	
1991–1992	Maud Sulter: Hysteria	Various locations: London, Liverpool, Birmingham	
1991	Zabat	Camerawork, London, England	
1993	Akwaba	Artspeak Gallery, Vancouver, Canada	
1993	Proverbs of Adwoa	Steinbaum Krauss Gallery, New York City, New York	
1994	Plantation	University of Leeds Gallery, Leeds; Plug In, Winnipeg, Canada	
1994	Syrcas	Wrexham Library Art Centre and Tour, Wrexham, Wales	
1995	Alba	Glasgow: Centre for Contemporary Art; Belfast: Ormeau Baths; Preston: Harris Museum and Art Gallery	
1995	Syrcas at Africus	Johannesburg Biennale. Johannesburg: Greater Johannesburg Transitional Metropolitan Council	
1999	My Father's House	Rich Women of Zurich, London, England	
2000	Plantation	Centre for Contemporary Art, University of Central Lancashire, Preston, England	
2003	Scots Poets	St Andrews: Stanza at the Byre Theatre	
2003	A Dozen Kisses	Dundas Street Gallery, Edinburgh, Scotland	
2003	Jeanne Duval: A Melodrama	Scottish National Portrait Gallery, Edinburgh, Scotland	
2004	About Face.	Edinburgh, Scotland	Organised by the Scottish Poetry Library.
2005	Sekhmet	Gracefield Arts Centre, Dumfries	
2016	Passion	Impressions Gallery, Bradford, England	

=== Group exhibitions ===
Group exhibitions
Dates	Name	Artists	Location	Notes
1987	Lubaina Himid: New Robes for MaShulan	Maud Sulter, Lubaina Himid	Rochdale Art Gallery, Rochdale, England	The work, A Room for MaSHULAN.
1988	Gold Blooded Warrior	Maud Sulter, Lubaina Himid	Tom Allen Centre, London, England	
1989	Blackwoman Song	Maud Sulter, Lubaina Himid	Sisterwrite Gallery, London, England	
1990	Treatise on the Sublime: Maud Sulter, Lubaina Himid	Maud Sulter, Lubaina Himid	Phebe Conley Art Gallery, California State University, Stanislaus, Turlock, California	
1995	Word Not Found.	Maud Sulter, Lubaina Himid	Galerie Palais Walderdorff, Trier, Germany	
2002	Speak English	Maud Sulter, Lubaina Himid	Glasgow School of Art, Glasgow, Scotland	
2002	Encontros Da Imagem photography festival		Braga, Portugal	
2006	Reading the Image: Poetics of the Black Diaspora	Maud Sulter, Deanna Bowen, Christopher Cozier, Michael Fernandes.	Thames Art Gallery, Chatham, Canada	
2008	Black Womanhood, Images, Icons, and Ideologies of the African Body		Various locations: Hood Museum of Art at Dartmouth, Davis Museum and Cultural Centre, San Diego Museum of Art	
2011	Thin Black Line(s).	Maud Sulter, Sutapa Biswas, Sonia Boyce, Lubaina Himid, Claudette Johnson, Ingrid Pollard, Veronica Ryan	Tate Britain museum, London, England	
2012	What We Have Done, What We Art About To Do		Centre for Contemporary Art, Glasgow, Scotland	
2012	Seduced by Art, Photography Past and Present		London: National Gallery; Barcelona: CaixaForum and Madrid: CaixaForum	
2013	Two Invisible Case Studies	Maud Sulter, Oladélé Ajiboyé Bamgboyé	Malmo Konsthall	Curated by Mother Tongue
2013	Looking in: Photographic Portraits by Maud Sulter and Chan-Hyo Bae.	Maud Sulter, Chan-Hyo Bae	Ben Uri Gallery, London, England	
2017	Coming Out: Sexuality, Gender, and Identity	Maud Sulter, Andy Warhol, Sarah Lucas, Grayson Perry, David Hockney, Francis Bacon, Steve McQueen, Derek Jarman, Sunil Gupta, Chila Kumari Burman, Linder, Richard Hamilton, Gillian Wearing, Eric Bainbridge, Marvin Gaye Chetwynd, Robert Colquhoun, Kate Davis, Jez Dolan, Mario Dubsky, Harry Diamond, Mark Francis, Anya Gallaccio, Colin Hall, Andrea Hamilton, Margaret Harrison, David Hurn, Bob Jardine, Isaac Julien, Karen Knorr, Hilary Lloyd, Robert MacBryde, Zanele Muholi, Catherine Opie, Hadrian Pigott, Charlotte Prodger, Hannah Quinlan & Rosie Hastings, James Richards, Derek Ridgers, David Robilliard, Keith Vaughan, John Walter, Annie Wright, Vanley Burke	Walker Gallery, Liverpool.	
2025	The 80s: Photographing Britain.	Keith Arnatt, Derek Bishton, Sutapa Biswas, Tessa Boffin, Marc Boothe, Victor Burgin, Vanley Burke, Pogus Caesar, Thomas Joshua Cooper, John Davies, Poulomi Desai, Al-An deSouza, Willie Doherty, Jason Evans, Rotimi Fani-Kayode, Anna Fox, Simon Foxton, Armet Francis, Peter Fraser, Melanie Friend, Paul Graham, Ken Grant, Joy Gregory, Sunil Gupta, John Harris, Lyle Ashton Harris, David Hoffman, Brian Homer, Colin Jones, Mumtaz Karimjee, Roshini Kempadoo, Peter Kennard, Chris Killip, Karen Knorr, Sirkka-Liisa Konttinen, Grace Lau, Dave Lewis, Markéta Luskačová, David Mansell, Jenny Matthews, Don McCullin, Roy Mehta, Peter Mitchell, Dennis Morris, Maggie Murray, Tish Murtha; Joanne O'Brien, Zak Ové, Martin Parr, Ingrid Pollard, Brenda Prince, Samena Rana, John Reardon, Paul Reas, Olivier Richon, Suzanne Roden, Franklyn Rodgers, Paul Seawright, Syd Shelton, Jem Southam, Jo Spence, John Sturrock, Maud Sulter, Homer Sykes, Mitra Tabrizian, Wolfgang Tillmans, Paul Trevor, Maxine Walker, Albert Watson, Tom Wood, Ajamu X.	Tate Britain, London, England	

== Publications ==
=== Books by Sulter ===
- As a Blackwoman, Poems 1982–1985. Urban Fox Press. 1985. ISBN 9781872124001.
- Zabat: Poetics of a Family Tree. Urban Fox Press. 1989. ISBN 9781872124056.
- (As editor) Passion: Discourses on Blackwomen's Creativity. An Urban Fox Press cultural studies imprint. Urban Fox Press. 1990. ISBN 9781872124315.
- Necropolis. Urban Fox Press. 1990. ISBN 9781872124063.
- Service to Empire. A19. 2002. ISBN 978-0954330200.
- Sekhmet: A Decade or So of Poems. Dumfries and Galloway Cultural Services. 2005. ISBN 978-0946280698.

=== Books about Sulter ===
- Echo: Works by Women Artists 1850–1940 (Exhibition book). London: Tate Gallery Publications. 1991. ISBN 9781854370815.
- Cherry, Deborah (2015). Maud Sulter: Passion. London: Altitude Editions. ISBN 978-1-906908-36-2.
- Lepine, Ayla; Lodde, Matt; McKever, Rosalind (2015). Revival: Memories, Identities, Utopias. Courtauld Books Online. ISBN 978-1-907485-04-6. In the section by Deborah Cherry, "The Ghost Begins by Coming Back: Revenants and Returns in Maud Sulter's Photomontages"
