= The Thin Black Line =

British Black and Asian exhibition

The Thin Black Line was a group exhibition of work by eleven Black and Asian women artists, curated by Lubaina Himid at the Institute of Contemporary Arts (ICA) in London, held from 15 November 1985 to 26 January 1986. The show is considered a landmark exhibition of the British Black Arts Movement, and a key moment in the recognition of Black and Asian women artists within British institutional art spaces. It was the third in a series of exhibitions curated by Himid in the early 1980s to challenge the collective invisibility of young Black and Asian women artists in Britain, following Five Black Women at the Africa Centre (1983) and Black Women Time Now at Battersea Arts Centre (1983–84).

The exhibition featured work by eleven artists: Brenda Agard, Sutapa Biswas, Sonia Boyce, Chila Burman, Jennifer Comrie, Lubaina Himid, Claudette Johnson, Ingrid Pollard, Veronica Ryan, Marlene Smith and Maud Sulter. Work was displayed primarily along the ICA's narrow walkway, a space intended to underline the artists' marginalisation within the mainstream art world, which gave the exhibition its title.

Several participants went on to receive major art prizes both in the UK and abroad. Himid won the Turner Prize in 2017 and Ryan in 2022. Boyce won the Golden Lion at the 2022 Venice Biennale, and Johnson was nominated for the Turner Prize in 2024.

The Thin Black Line has been revisited by two major London institutions since its original run. In 2011–12, Himid and curator Paul Goodwin curated Thin Black Line(s), a single-room display at Tate Britain that took its name from the 1985 exhibition, showing work by seven of the original artists alongside archival material relating to it and Himid's two earlier 1983 exhibitions. In 2025, the ICA held Connecting Thin Black Lines 1985–2025, an exhibition and event programme curated by Himid marking the original exhibition's 40th anniversary. Work by all eleven original artists was shown together for the first time since 1985, alongside new commissions and previously unseen archival correspondence.
