= Ten.8 =

British photography periodical 1979–1992

- Frequency: Quarterly
- First issue: 1979 (46 years ago)
- Final issue: 1992 (33 years ago)
- Company: Ten.8 Ltd.
- Country: United Kingdom
- Based in: Birmingham
- Language: English
- ISSN: 0142-9663

Ten.8 was a British photography magazine founded in 1979 and published quarterly in Birmingham, England, throughout the 1980s, folding in 1992.

== History ==
Ten.8 (the title referring to the 10" x 8" format of the traditional black-and-white photographic press print, and echoic of the word "tenet") was founded in 1979 by the Birmingham photographer associates Derek Bishton, Brian Homer and John Reardon (1951–2018) in order to promote the city's photographers. The magazine was produced in upstairs office space of the Birmingham Arts Lab.

The trio had previously undertaken community-based work together, creating the Handsworth Self Portrait in Grove Lane in Handsworth where Vanley Burke lived and photographed. During the autumn of 1979, prior to the 1981 riots, they provided passing pedestrians with the opportunity to make self-portraits against a white backdrop using an extension shutter release with the assistance of a photographer. Their landmark effort was to counter the bad press that the inner-city neighbourhood was receiving, and the stereotyping and blaming of its residents for its conditions, by showing the diverse faces of its population. The result was shown in Birmingham and elsewhere.

A collective was formed that included Roy Peters, then studying photography at Birmingham's Centre for Contemporary Cultural Studies, social documentary photographer Nick Hedges, Stourbridge College lecturer John Taylor, and later Paul Lewis from Wolverhampton Polytechnic and John Hodgett form Bournville College of Art.

By 1984, Rhonda Wilson (1953–2014) had joined the editorial board and had a lasting influence. She designed two issues; "Another Coal Face" (1984) and "Evidence" (1987). In 1988, when she and Roshini Kempadoo co-edited the Spectrum Women's Photography Festival exhibition catalogue, it was published as a special supplement to issue 30.

Editor Derek Bishton established "Ten.8 Touring", an exhibition touring project in 1987 and when in 1989, Ten.8's loose co-operative was formalised as a limited company, Wilson became one of the magazine's directors and took up responsibility for the touring program, benefitting from her visit during the period to Houston FotoFest in the US by emulating their portfolio reviews. Wilson left Ten.8 in 1991 and was later awarded an MBE for her services to photography.

== Photographers ==
Contributing photographers came from a new breed of documentary workers and included Paul Hill, Angela Kelly, Brian Griffin, Abbas, Susan Meiselas, Vanley Burke, Nigel Dickinson, and Chris Steele-Perkins and their imagery appeared alongside writing by academics and community activists. The quarterly format permitted the collation of material into themed editions. It was one of a number of niche British magazines dedicated to critical discussions of photography and related media in the 1980s, that included Screen, Screen Education, Camerawork, and Creative Camera.

== Content and context ==
In an editorial the magazine proclaimed:

As an editorial group, we are not committed to any one theory about photography, and we will not be championing any one way of making pictures. We believe that our strength lies in this very eclecticism, and make no apology that in this issue, and in the future, we shall be examining issues from a variety of standpoints.

These "issues" included the following, which were covered in themed editions:

=== Class ===
The stance of Ten.8 was in the left-wing intellectual tradition, entrenched in the year it was founded at the end of James Callaghan's minority Labour government and the "Winter of Discontent" in which imposed wage restraint led to widespread industrial action, followed by the election of Margaret Thatcher, the campaign at Greenham Common (1981–2000) and the fateful UK miners' strike (1984–85). The issue no. 15, 1984, dealt with working-class representation in unemployment and homelessness, and hidden relationships of power, through the frame of George Orwell's Down and Out in Paris and London, and his The Road to Wigan Pier and the 1930s Depression.

=== Feminism ===
The tenth edition of the magazine reflected on recent histories of feminism in documentary photography in Britain. Published in 1983, four years after the first edition, the issue's content was themed 'Photography, peace and protest', with a central photo essay titled "Greenham Common".

=== Social justice ===
In the context of its physical location amongst the migrant communities of Birmingham, Ten.8 promoted the struggle for British Black and Asian social justice as reflected in photographic and media representations. Ten.8, vol. 2, no. 3, 1992, titled Critical Decade: Black British Photography in the 80s, was an important edition as a retrospective guide to recent black cultural politics in times of rapid and turbulent change in which theory and practice dealt with race, politics and representation. An introduction written by David A. Bailey and Stuart Hall, is followed by their essay "The Vertigo of Displacement: shifts within black documentary practices", and other contributions by Kobena Mercer, Isaac Julian, Pratibha Parmar, Aurat Shakti, Mumtaz Karimjee, Amina Patel, Gilane Tawadros, Eddie Chambers, Paul Gilroy and Sonali Fernando that pursue multiple issues of identity and the black photographic image, skin colour, diaspora, blackness as a cultural icon, racial confrontation and sexuality.

The writing of that issue is framed with images by David Lewis, Vanley Burke, and Franklyn Rodgers, Armet Francis, Joy Gregory, Vincent Stokes, Sutapwa Biswas, Sonia Boyce, Keith Piper, Chila Burman, Samena Rana, Sunil Gupta, David Lewis, Maxine Walker, Roshini Kempadoo, Ingrid Pollard, Mitra Tabrizian, Zarina Bhimji, Pat Ward Williams, Carrie Mae Weems, Clarissa Sligh, Lorna Simpson, Claudette Holmes, Peter Max Kandhola, Valerie Brown, Susan Banton, Jeni McKenzie and Mumtaz Karimjee.

=== Intellectualism ===
Ten.8 has been called a "First World" commentary on culture, compared with the contemporaneous pop culture magazine The Face as a representation of the "Second World". Where the latter advised on "street credibility" and "nous" for those negotiating fashion, urban living and the music scene, Ten.8 featured knowledgeable and fiercely contested debates on the history, theory, politics and practice of photography and offered source material for educators.

By including imagery of, and writing around, political and social developments, the magazine sought to provide understanding of ways in which photographic practice was engaged in ideological processes that Bishton articulated as a crisis of the documentary form "inscribed into the currencies of social and cultural discourse". Bishton regarded the key functions of Ten.8 as promoting photographs from the cultures and sub-cultures of everyday life and engaging critical thinking about the work of the photograph. John Taylor as an editor and writer advanced theorisation of photography through publishing writings by Stuart Hall, John Tagg and Victor Burgin.

== Demise ==
Ten.8's cessation was the result of a loss of income. Reorganisation at funding body the Arts Council of England, in which photography funding was subsumed by Visual Arts and promoted in a Fine Art context, ended what Arts Council's Photography Officer, Barry Lane, had been developing and had understood as British independent photography.

== Influence and legacy ==
Ten.8 was positioned temporally and critically at the Modern-to-Postmodern turn, at a period when the decoding of photographs was contested, and it heralded new cultural forms of contemporary networked and commodified digital culture. In 1978 the number of colleges in the UK offering photography as a degree subject was a mere handful, and during the magazine's lifetime such institutions proliferated, and most had texts from the publication in their course materials.

Ten.8 had an impact that drew international readers; from an initial print run of 500 in 1979, to 5,000 in 1992. Ten.8 was represented at the Houston FotoFest and at Recontres Au Noir, Arles Photographic Festival (1993). In summing up a conference The Legacy of Ten:8 Symposium, 4 May 2011 at the Midlands Arts Centre (MAC) in Birmingham, Andrew Dewdney wrote:

the current and acknowledged legacy of Ten:8 [sic] is then to have been part of the constitution of the very subjectness of photography as an academic discipline. This is true of the work of the photographers it foregrounded, the models of engaged photographic practices it reported upon, the theorists it published and, perhaps more significantly, its own model of attempting to hold theory and practice together.

== See also ==
- Camerawork
