= Brenda Agard =

British photographer

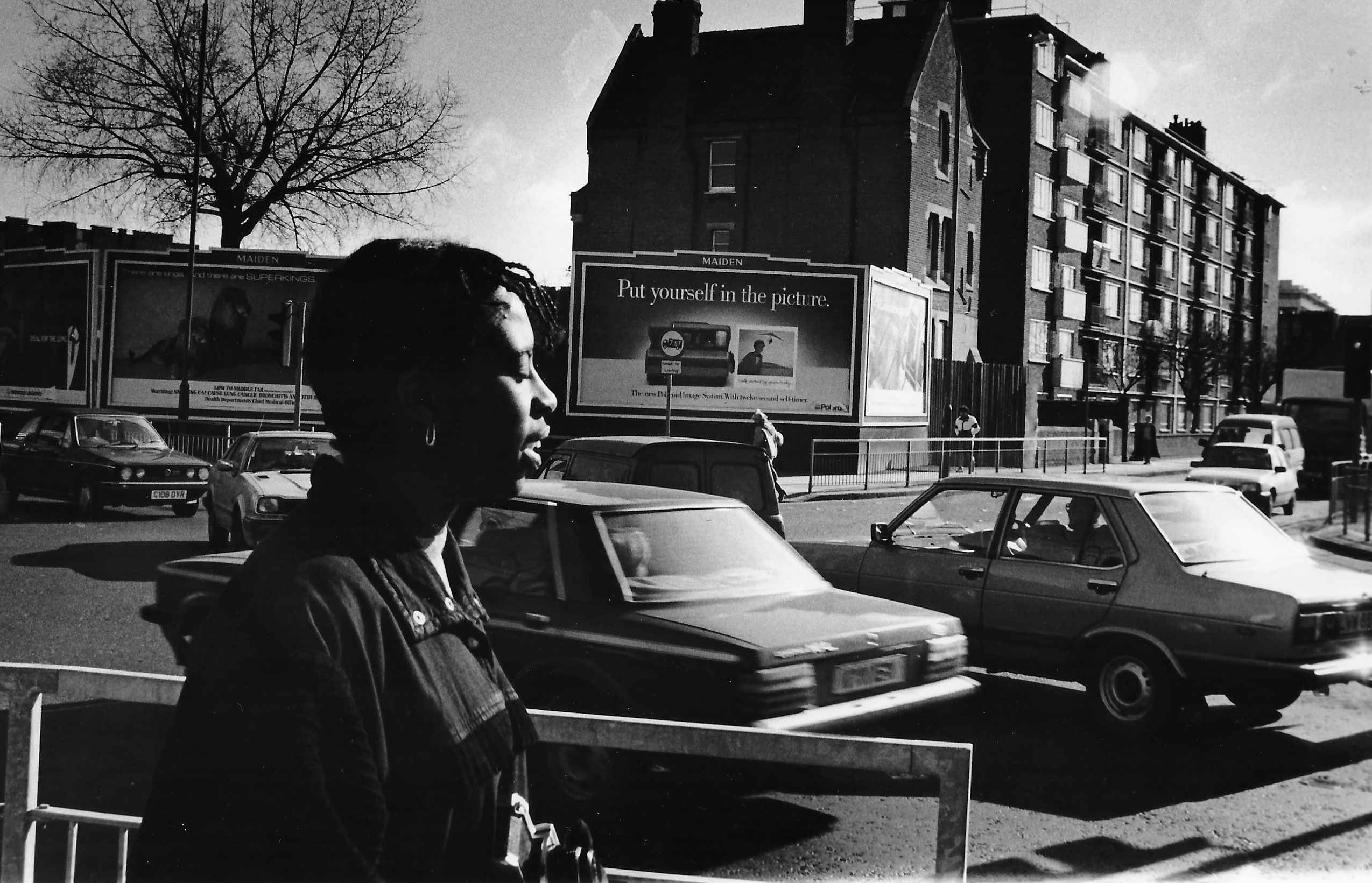
- Brenda Agard, 1987 photo shoot
- Born: 20 August 1961; London, England
- Died: 29 October 2012 (aged 51); London, England
- Occupations: Photographer, artist, poet and storyteller
- Movement: Active during the UK Black Arts Movement
- Partner: Joseph Olubo

Brenda Patricia Agard (20 August 1961 – 29 October 2012) was a Black-British photographer, artist, poet and storyteller who was most active in the 1980s, when she participated in some of the first art exhibitions organized by Black-British artists in the United Kingdom. Agard's work focused on creating "affirming images centred on the resilience of the Black woman," according to art historian Eddie Chambers.

== Photographic career ==
Agard participated in several group shows in the burgeoning Black Arts movement in London in the 1980s, an early example of which was Mirror Reflecting Darkly, a 1985 group show at the Brixton Art Gallery organized by eleven black women. The stated goal of the show was to "exhibit the diversity within the concept of black women and challenge people's expectations, perpetuated by stereotypes."

Later in 1985, Agard participated in the seminal show The Thin Black Line at the Institute of Contemporary Art London, curated by Lubaina Himid, who wrote in the forward to the exhibition's catalogue: "We are eleven of the hundreds of creative Black Women in Britain. We are here to stay."

Agard was also a member of "The Black Photographers Group", a project organized by artist and BLK Art Group co-founder Eddie Chambers, whose objective was "the credible insertion of black photography into mainstream art and photographic venues in Britain." Others in the group besides Chambers and Agard included: David A. Bailey, Marc Boothe, Godfrey Brown, Dave Lewis, Ingrid Pollard, and Suzanne Roden.

In 2011, Tate Britain exhibited a retrospective of shows curated by Himid in the 1980s titled Thin Black Line(s). Agard's photography was involved in two of the three shows referenced in the exhibitions The Thin Black Line and Black Woman Time Now.

== Writing ==
Agard was a founding member of Polareyes: A Journal by and about Black Women Working in Photography. The publication launched in 1987 with an editorial group including Brenda Agard, Similola Coker, Mumtaz Karimjee, Jenny McKenzie, Lesley Mitchell, Amina Patel, Samena Rana, Molly Shinhat, and Maxine Walker. The inaugural issue included an essay by Agard titled "Photography: An Extension of" which outlined her intentions as a photographer.

Agard was also a playwright and a poet, whose writing, according to scholar Maggie Humm, drew its "vocabulary primarily from black English and Caribbean dialect", and helped "establish some important characteristics of black feminist writing".

Four poems by Agard – "Nobody", "Business Partners", "Nothing Said", and "Black Truth" – are collected in the anthology Watchers and Seekers: Creative Writing by Black Women, edited by Rhonda Cobham and Merle Collins.

== Exhibitions and collections ==
- Black Woman Time Now, a group show featuring 15 artists at the Battersea Arts Centre in London, from 30 November – 31 December 1983; curated by Lubaina Himid.
- The Selectors' Show, at Camerawork, London, 1984. Agard exhibited with Mitra Tabrizian.
- Mirror Reflecting Darkly at the Brixton Art Gallery in London, 18 June–6 July 1985.
- The Thin Black Line at the Institute of Contemporary Arts in London, 15 November 1985 – 26 January 1986; curated by Lubaina Himid."
- Some of Us Are Brave All of Us Are Strong at The Black-Art Gallery in London, 13 February–15 March 1986.
- UnRecorded Truths at The Elbow Room in London, 16 April–16 May 1986.
- Testimony: Three Blackwomen Photographers: Brenda Agard, Ingrid Pollard, Maud Sulter at Camerawork London and The Pavilion Leeds; curated by Maud Sulter, and nominated for the Sun Life/Fox Talbot Photography Award.
- Influences: the Art of Sokari Douglas Camp, Keith Piper, Lubaina Himid, Simone Alexander, Joseph Olubo, Brenda Agard at South London Gallery, 9–29 September 1988.
- Spectrum Women's Festival Open Exhibition at South London Gallery, 1988. Agard exhibited with Zarina Bhimji, Pratibha Parman, and Suzanne Roden. 32-page catalog.
- Agard performed as part of Donald Rodney's show Cataract, exhibited at Camerawork London in 1991.
- Agard's photograph Portrait of Our Time is in the collection of Museums Sheffield as part of Marlene Smith's 1987 mixed-media work Art History.
- Agard is interviewed in the 1995 film Three Songs on Pain Light and Time, about the life and work of artist Donald Rodney, part of the Black Arts Video Project series by the Black Audio Film Collective.

== Legacy ==
In contrast to several of her close contemporaries, such as Maud Sulter and Donald Rodney, who have been recognized by museums and gallery retrospectives, Agard "remains tragically consigned to obscurity despite having created a cutting-edge body of work", according to art historian Celeste-Marie Bernier.

== External sources ==
Forty-one photographs taken by Phil Polglaze at the South London Art Gallery on 8 September 1988 during the private view of the exhibition Influences: The Art of Sokari Douglas Camp, Keith Piper, Lubaina Himid, Simone Alexander, Joseph Olubo, Brenda Agard. Several photographs are of the artists with his or her artwork, including Agard.

Brenda Patricia Agard on the African American Visual Artists Database
