= Dorothy Price (art historian) =

Professor of Art History

Professor Dorothy Price FBA
- Born: Dorothy Cilla Rowe; 1969 (age 56–57)

Academic background
- Education: University of Leicester; University of Essex

Academic work
- Discipline: History of Art
- Institutions: University of East Anglia; Roehampton University; University of Bristol; The Courtauld Institute of Art

Dorothy Cilla Price FBA (born 1969) is a British art historian and academic. She is Professor of Modern and Contemporary Art and Critical Race Art History at the Courtauld Institute of Art. She was previously Professor of History of Art at the University of Bristol, and was the first woman of colour to be appointed to a Chair in Art History at a Russell Group university. Price researches, teaches, and curates on "histories, art and thought of people of African descent", also teaching on German modernism, German expressionism, and post-war Black British art, with a focus on women artists. In 2021, she was elected a Fellow of the British Academy.

== Career ==
Price studied history of art at the University of Leicester.

As Professor of History of Art at Bristol, Price was a founder member and inaugural Director of the Centre for Black Humanities. She was appointed Professor of Modern and Contemporary Art and Visual Culture at the Courtauld in 2021.

Price has served as Editor of Art History, the journal of the Association for Art History. In 2021, she co-edited a special issue with Sonia Boyce on Black British Modernism.

In 2022, Price curated 'Making Modernism' at the Royal Academy, London, focussed on women artists working in Germany in the early 1900s.

== Academic and public service ==
Price is a trustee of the Holburne Museum, Bath and a trustee of Spike Island, Bristol.

With Chantal Joffe and Andrew Nairne, Price served as a judge for the Trinity Buoy Wharf Drawing Prize 2019.

She sits on the Academic Advisory Board and Exhibitions Committee of the Royal West of England Academy.

In 2019 Price founded the British Art Network subgroup on Black British Art at the Tate/Paul Mellon Centre.

She is a continuing member of the British Art Network Steering Group in 2021–2022.

== Selected publications ==
- Representing Berlin (2003)
- Women the Arts and Globalization (with Marsha Meskimmon) (2013)
- After Dada (2013)
- Chantal Joffe: Personal Feeling is the Main Thing (2018). This book project stemmed for work done as co-curator with Joffe of an exhibition at The Lowry, Salford in 2018.
- Catherine Grant and Dorothy Price, “Decolonizing Art History”, Art History 43, no. 1 (January 2020): 8–66, doi:10.1111/1467-8365.12490.
