= Black Women Time Now =

Black Women Time Now was a 1983 art exhibition at the Battersea Arts Centre in London, featuring the work of fifteen artists announcing themselves as Black Women.

The exhibition, curated by Lubaina Himid, was funded by the GLC. The participating artists were Ingrid Pollard, Veronica Ryan, Claudette Johnson, Sonia Boyce, Lubaina Himid, Chila Burman, Mumtaz Karimjee, Houria Niati, Jean Campbell, Andrea Telman, Margaret Cooper, Elizabeth Eugene, Leslee Wills, Cherry Lawrence and Brenda Agard. A programme of theatre, film, music, poetry and dance accompanied the visual art exhibition.

Black Women can be seen as an "active community of artists". Himid had earlier curated the work of several of the same artists at 5 Black Women, a smaller exhibition at the Africa Centre.
