= Maxine Walker =

British-Jamaican photographer and critic (born 1962)

Maxine Walker (born 1962) is a British-Jamaican photographer and critic. Based in Handsworth and active between 1985 and 1997, Walker has been described by Rianna Jade Parker as "a force within the Black British Art movement". Her photographs emphasise the fictive nature of documentary convention, and "raise questions about the nature of identity, challenging racial stereotypes".

== Life ==
Maxine Walker was born in 1962 in Birmingham, England.

Walker's 1987 series Auntie Lindie's House challenged the unmediated nature of documentary photography, replicating photographic conventions within a fictional context. Black Beauty, a 1980s series, and Untitled, a series for the 1995 Self Evident exhibition, both consisted of self-portraits. Untitled contained a sequence of ten closely-cropped black and white photographs, in which Walker appeared to peel away successive layers of her surface skin.

Walker has written various reviews and texts for art magazines and exhibition-related publication. After Polareyes, a 1987 exhibition of black women photographers at the Camden Arts Centre, she co-edited and contributed to a short-lived journal of the same name. In 1999 she published a short artist's book in the series published by Autograph.

== Works ==
=== Exhibitions ===
- Polareyes: Black Women Photographers, Camden Arts Centre, 1987. With Brenda Agard, Margaret Andrews, Zarina Bhimji, Similola Coker, Joy Gregory, Rhona Harritte, Joy Kahumbu, Mumtaz Karimjee, Linda King, Jenny Mckenzie, Tracey Moffatt, Amina Patel, Ingrid Pollard, Samena Rana, Molly Shinhat, Sharon Wallace, Geraldine Walsh, Gloria Walsh, and Halina Zajac.
- Intimate Distance: Five Female Artists, The Photographers' Gallery, 1989. With Zarina Bhimji, Sutapa Biswas, Mona Hatoum and Ingrid Pollard.
- Self Evident, Ikon Gallery, August–September 1995. With Seydou Keita, Mama Casset, Oladélé Ajiboyé Bamgboyé and Ingrid Pollard. Curated by Mark Sealy.
- (solo) UNTITLED, Autograph ABP, April–August 2019. Curated by Renée Mussai and Bindi Vora.
- (solo) UNTITLED, Midlands Arts Centre, April–June 2020.

=== Writing ===
- "Boxed Gems". Polareyes: A Journal by and about Black Women working in photography. 1: 42–43. 1987.
- "We do not Wish to do it Quietly". Ten.8. 27: 42–45.
- "Testimony: Three Black Women Photographers". Creative Camera. 4: 34. 1987.
- "Beauty and the Beast: Have Images of Black Women in the Media Changed over the Years?". Blackboard Review. 2: 12–13. 1990.
- 'Intimate Distance', in Jo Spence; Patricia Holland, eds. (1991). Family Snaps. London: Virago. pp. 222–225.
- Mark Sealy, ed. (1999). Maxine Walker: Monograph. Autograph. ISBN 1899282505.
