= Joseph Olubo =

British artist and book illustrator

- Born: 29 August 1953; United Kingdom
- Died: 24 April 1990 (aged 36); London, England
- Occupations: Artist, illustrator
- Partner: Brenda Agard

Joseph Adekunle Olubo (29 August 1953 – 24 April 1990) was an artist and book illustrator active in the 1980s. He participated in some of the first art exhibitions organized by Black British artists in the United Kingdom. Olubo was one of 22 artists included in the 1983 inaugural exhibition, Heart in Exile, at The Black-Art Gallery, an art space in London which worked with artists of African and Caribbean backgrounds.

Olubo died on 24 April 1990, aged 36.

== Exhibitions ==
- Heart in Exile: An Exhibition of Drawing, Painting, Sculpture and Photography by British-based Black Artists at The Black-Art Gallery (London), from September 4 - October 2, 1983.
- ...and Remembering, Remain: An Exhibition of Lithographs, Screenprints and Collage at Royal Festival Hall (London), from June 20 – July 7, 1985.
- New Horizons: An Exhibition of Arts at the Royal Festival Hall (London), 1985. Included 61-page exhibition catalog.
- Influences: the Art of Sokari Douglas Camp, Keith Piper, Lubaina Himid, Simone Alexander, Joseph Olubo, Brenda Agard at South London Gallery, from September 9-September 29, 1988.
- Ask Me No Questions – I Tell You No Lie: An Exhibition of Painting and Sculpture Dedicated to the Memory of Jo Olubo at The Black Art Gallery (London), from September 6 – October 20, 1990. 8-page exhibition catalog.
- A Cultural Awakening at The Black Gallery (London), an exhibition dedicated to the late Joseph Olubo, featuring the paintings of self-taught Nigerian artist Ademola Akintola, 1990.

== Books illustrated ==
- The Arawaks of Jamaica. [S.l.]: Handprint, 1990. Karl Phillpotts, author. 16 pages. Colville Grant, illustrator; cover drawing by Joseph Olubo.
- So This Is England. London: Peckham Publishing Project (a community-based initiative), 1984, 68 pages.
- Spiderman Anancy. New York: H. Holt, 1989. James Berry, author. The West Indian trickster Anancy and his companions Bro Monkey, Bro Dog, and Bro Tiger are featured collection of twenty tales.
- Nanny of the Maroons, Marjorie Gammon and Karl Phillpotts, authors and Jamaican graphic artist Wilfred Limonious and Joseph Olubo, illustrators. Published by JAMAL Foundation, 1990. Handprint, 20 pages.

== External resources ==
- Joseph Adekunle Olubo listed on the African American Visual Artists Database.
- Forty-one photographs taken by Phil Polglaze at the South London Art Gallery on 8 September 1988 during the private view of the exhibition Influences: The Art of Sokari Douglas Camp, Keith Piper, Lubaina Himid, Simone Alexander, Joseph Olubo, Brenda Agard. Several photographs are of the artists with his or her artwork, including Olubo.
