= Claudette Johnson =

British artist (born 1959)

Claudette Johnson MBE RA
- Born: Claudette Elaine Johnson; 1959 (age 66–67); Manchester, England
- Education: Wolverhampton Polytechnic
- Known for: Visual artist
- Movement: BLK Art Group
- Elected: Royal Academy of Arts (2024)

Claudette Elaine Johnson MBE RA (born 1959) is a British visual artist. She is known for her large-scale drawings of Black women and her involvement with the BLK Art Group, of which she was a founder member. She was described by Modern Art Oxford as "one of the most accomplished figurative artists working in Britain today". A finalist for the Turner Prize in 2024, Johnson was elected to the Royal Academy of Arts the same year.

Her work is in a number of public collections, including the Tate Britain, Arts Council England, Manchester Art Gallery, Fitzwilliam Museum.

== Biography ==
Claudette Johnson was born in Manchester, UK. She studied Fine Art at Wolverhampton Polytechnic. While still a student there, she became a founder member of the BLK Art Group and took part in their second show at the Africa Centre, London, in 1983. Her talk, and seminar, at the First National Black Arts Conference in 1982 is recognised as a formative moment in the Black feminist art movement in the UK.

Johnson's work has featured in important group exhibitions such as Five Black Women at London's Africa Centre Gallery in 1983, Black Woman Time Now at Battersea Arts Centre in the same year, and The Thin Black Line at the ICA in London in 1986. Reviewing her 1992 solo exhibition In This Skin: Drawings by Claudette Johnson, at the Black Art Gallery, London, artist Steve McQueen (at the time a student at Goldsmiths College) wrote: "What she does is to bring out the soul, sensuality, dignity, and spirituality of the black woman....Claudette Johnson's work is rooted in her African heritage. Her talent is as powerful as it is obvious."

Lubaina Himid describes Johnson's work as "deeply sensuous" and "richly coloured". The artist calls the Black women in her drawings "monoliths, larger than life versions of women". Eddie Chambers notes: "These portraits were imposing pieces that demanded the viewer’s attention, as well as their respect."

In 2011, Johnson co-founded the BLK Arts Research Group with Marlene Smith and Keith Piper, to re-examine the BLK Arts Group's body of work and historical legacy. In 2012, two major projects were staged by this research group: a symposium with a retrospective exhibition entitled The Blk Art Group was held at the Graves Gallery, Sheffield, and an international conference entitled "Reframing the Moment" was held at the University of Wolverhampton. Her work was included in the Guildhall Art Gallery exhibition No Colour Bar: Black British Art in Action 1960–1990 (10 July 2015 – 24 January 2016).

Johnson had a solo exhibition at Hollybush Gardens, London (17 November 2017 – 22 December 2017), where a series of seven of her large-scale works on paper was presented, about which Frieze magazine said: "As a body of work, it possesses a profound and tender intimacy."

In 2019, Johnson's first major institutional exhibition since 1990 was held at Modern Art Oxford, the show being described as "an overview of one of the most accomplished figurative artists working in Britain today....her art sets out to redress negative portrayals of black men and women and to counter the invisibility of black people in cultural spheres and beyond." The reviewer for Art Fund wrote: "Intimate, powerful and sometimes deliberately uncomfortable, Claudette Johnson’s studies of black men and women demand attention and command respect." According to Apollo magazine: "While Johnson asserts that blackness is a fiction created by colonialism, she insists that this fiction 'can be interrupted by an encounter with the stories that we have to tell about ourselves'. Johnson's subjects, by turns defiant and wary, funny and challenging, represent the varieties of stories that can be told by, in the artist’s words, 'Blackwoman presence.' As Johnson says, 'I’m interested in our humanity, our feelings and our politics.' Her art encapsulates all this in the tenderness and willfulness of the individual human form."

Claudette Johnson: Presence at the Courtauld Gallery opened in September 2023, marking the first monographic show of Johnson's work at a major public gallery in London. A critic at The Guardian praised the way Johnson "brilliantly questions depictions of non-white figures by such revered painters as Gauguin and Picasso", adding that "the quiet power of Johnson's current work leaves theory behind" and "invites a more meditative response".

Johnson's work is in the collections of the Tate Britain, Rugby Art Gallery, Arts Council England, Mappin Art Gallery, Manchester Art Gallery, Herbert Art Gallery, Baltimore Museum of Art, The Fitzwilliam Museum, and Wolverhampton Art Gallery.

Johnson was appointed Member of the Order of the British Empire (MBE) in the 2022 New Year Honours for services to art. In 2022, she received an honorary doctorate from Wolverhampton University, where she graduated from with a degree in Fine Art in 1982.

Her solo exhibitions Presence at the Courtauld Gallery, in London, and her first New York solo show Drawn Out at Ortuzar Projects, are cited in her nomination as one of the four finalists for the 2024 Turner Prize. She was elected to the Royal Academy in March 2024.

Notable commissions include: a portrait of Stuart Hall by Merton College, University of Oxford; a mural at Brixton tube station, entitled "Three Women", commissioned by Art on the Underground and unveiled in October 2024; and a portrait of transnational activist Sarah Parker Remond commissioned by The Guardian in 2023 as part of its Cotton Capital project.

== Selected exhibitions ==
- 1983: Five Black Women Artists. Africa Centre, London.
- 1983: Black Women Time Now. Battersea Arts Centre London.
- 1984: Into the Open: New Paintings Prints and Sculptures by Black Contemporary Artists. Mappin Art Gallery, Sheffield.
- 1986: The Thin Black Line. Institute of Contemporary Arts, London.
- 1987: The Image Employed: The Use of Narrative in Black Art. Corner-House, Manchester.
- 1992: In This Skin: Drawings by Claudette Johnson. Black Art Gallery, London.
- 1997: Transforming the Crown: African, Asian and Caribbean Artists in Britain 1966–1986. Royal Festival Hall, London, and The Caribbean Cultural Centre, The Studio Museum in Harlem and The Bronx Museum of the Arts, New York.
- 2012: Thin Black Line(s). Tate Britain, London.
- 2015–16: No Colour Bar: Black British Art in Action 1960–1990, Guildhall Art Gallery, London
- 2017: Claudette Johnson, Hollybush Gardens, London
- 2019: Claudette Johnson: I Came to Dance, Modern Art Oxford (1 June – 8 September 2019)
- 2023: Claudette Johnson: Presence. Courtauld, London (29 September 2023 – 14 January 2024)
- 2023: Claudette Johnson: Drawn Out. Ortuzar Projects, New York
