= Kenneth Tharp =

British dancer and choreographer (born 1960)

Kenneth Tharp CBE
- Born: Kenneth Olumuyiwa Tharp; 11 February 1960 (age 66); Croydon, Surrey, England
- Education: The Perse School; Cambridge College of Arts and Technology; London Contemporary Dance School
- Occupations: Dancer and choreographer

Kenneth Olumuyiwa Tharp CBE (born 11 February 1960), is a British dance artist, who was chief executive of The Place (2007–16) and director of the Africa Centre, London (2018–20).

== Biography ==
Born in 1960 at Croydon, Surrey, to English mother Pamela Tharp and Nigerian father Gabriel Oluwole Esuruoso (1934–2013), his father, who had been a journalist for the Daily Times in Nigeria, came to Britain supported by a government scholarship in the late 1950s to study veterinary medicine at the University of Glasgow. The first African to earn a doctorate in Immunology at the University of Birmingham, in 1964 Esuruoso returned to Nigeria with his wife, Victoria Wuraola Emmanuel, and their three children, becoming a Government veterinary officer, before being appointed as a professor in the Department of Veterinary Public Health and Preventive Medicine, and Dean of Veterinary Medicine, at the University of Ibadan.

Tharp attended The Perse School, Cambridge College of Arts and Technology, and trained at London Contemporary Dance School, receiving a BA in Contemporary Dance in 1987. His 25-year performing career included working with London Contemporary Dance Theatre (1981–94) and Arc Dance Company (1994–2005). He has worked as a choreographer, teacher and director, and was lead artist and artistic advisor for the Royal Ballet School’s Dance Partnership & Access Programme and assistant to the Head of Contemporary Dance at Millennium Dance 2000. With composer Simon Redfern, Tharp co-founded ArtyfartyArts, a multi-disciplinary arts group, and has been on the board of Trustees of the Royal Opera House.

In 2005, Tharp undertook a NESTA-funded Fellowship on the Clore Leadership Programme.

Having was chief executive of The Place from September 2007 to November 2016. In May 2018 Tharp was appointed director of the Africa Centre, London.

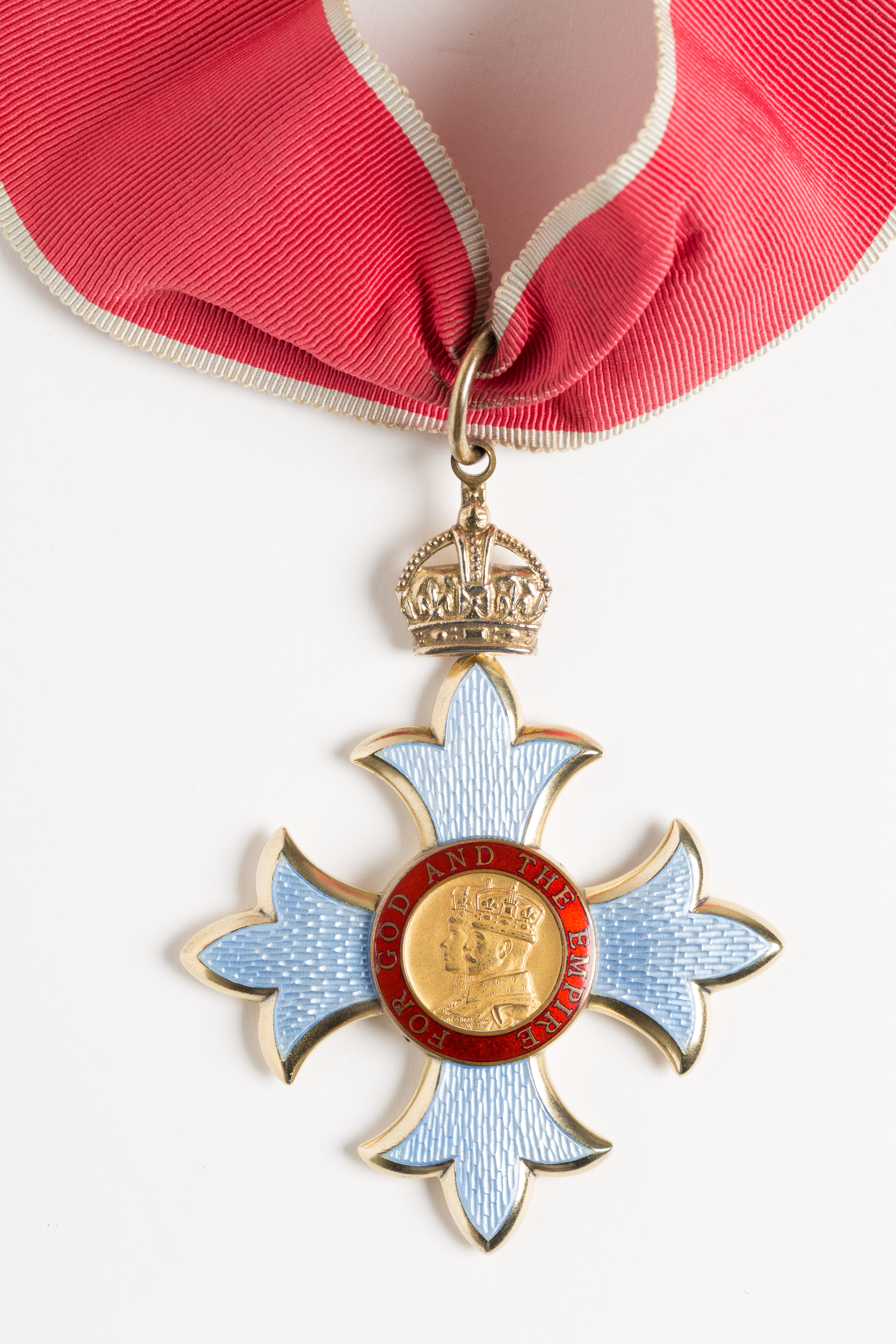
CBE insignia

== Awards and recognition ==
Appointed an Officer of the Order of the British Empire (OBE) in 2003, Tharp was promoted Commander of the Order of the British Empire (CBE) in the 2017 Birthday Honours, both "for services to dance".

Tharp was named one of London's 1000 Most Influential People by the Evening Standard in 2015.
