= Feeling Her Way =

2022 art exhibition

Feeling Her Way is an art exhibition by Sonia Boyce shown in the British pavilion of the 2022 Venice Biennale.
