= Custard Apple (Annonaceae), Breadfruit (Moraceae) and Soursop (Annonaceae) =

Sculptures by Veronica Ryan in Hackney, London, England

Coordinates: 51.5476°N 0.0546°W

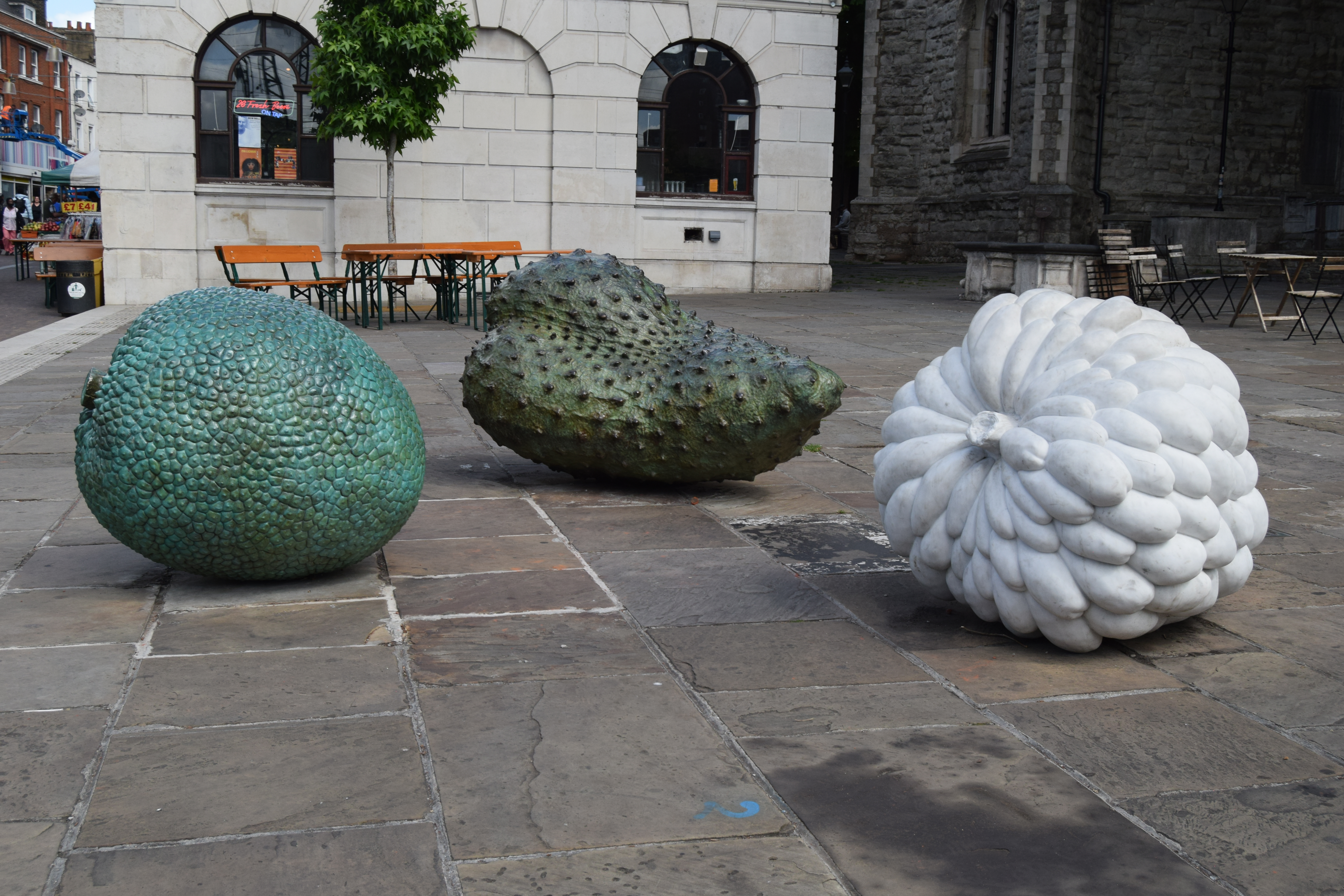
The sculptures. From left to right: breadfruit, soursop, custard apple.

Custard Apple (Annonaceae), Breadfruit (Moraceae) and Soursop (Annonaceae) are three sculptures by Veronica Ryan that stand on Narrow Way, near St Augustine's Tower in Hackney, London. They were commissioned by Hackney's Windrush Artwork Commission, as a memorial to the Windrush generation of British African-Caribbean people who immigrated to the United Kingdom in the wake of World War II. They are the first permanent public sculptures by a black female artist in the United Kingdom.

The works were unveiled 1 October 2021. The three sculptures represent Caribbean tropical fruits — custard apple, breadfruit and soursop — in reference to the nearby Ridley Road Market.

Ryan said of the work that "Ridley Market here in Hackney remains a vibrant place of early excitement going shopping with my mother, I don’t often get along to the market now, but have been so happy to buy some lovely soursops and custard apples on recent visits" and that "Cultural visibility and representation evident in public spaces is crucial. I am very happy that my sculptures will be part of this recognition".

The works were commissioned as part of the Black History Season of Hackney London Borough Council and Create London. They stand near St Augustine's Tower and the fruit markets on Narrow Way. A consultation seeking views from local residents was held in 2018.

The sculptures received the 2022 Marsh Award for Excellence in Public Sculpture and the 2022 Turner Prize.

== See also ==
- National Windrush Monument – unveiled in June 2022
