= Sonia Boyce =

British Afro-Caribbean visual artist (born 1962)

Dame Sonia Boyce DBE RA HonFBA
- Born: Sonia Dawn Boyce; 1962 (age 63–64); London, England
- Education: Eastlea Comprehensive School (1973–79); East Ham College of Art and Technology (1979–80) (Foundation); Stourbridge College of Technology & Art (1980–83) (BA)
- Notable work: Feeling Her Way (2022)
- Movement: UK Black Arts Movement
- Partner: David A. Bailey
- Children: 2
- Awards: Golden Lion at the 59th Venice Biennale (2022)
- Elected: Royal Academy of Arts (2016)
- Website: soniaboyce.com

Dame Sonia Dawn Boyce DBE RA HonFBA (born 1962) is a British Afro-Caribbean artist and educator who lives and works in London. She is a Professor of Black Art and Design at University of the Arts London. Boyce's research interests explore art as a social practice and the critical and contextual debates that arise from this area of study. Boyce has been closely collaborating with other artists since 1990 with a focus on collaborative work, frequently involving improvisation and unplanned performative actions on the part of her collaborators. Boyce's work involves a variety of media, such as drawing, print, photography, video, and sound. Her art explores "the relationship between sound and memory, the dynamics of space, and incorporating the spectator". Boyce has taught Fine Art studio practice in several art colleges across the UK.

In March 2016, Boyce was elected to the Royal Academy of Arts in London, becoming the first black female Royal Academician since the academy's founding in 1768.

In February 2020, Boyce was selected by the British Council to represent Britain at the Venice Biennale 2022, the first black woman to do so. In April 2022, Boyce won the Venice Biennale's top Golden Lion prize with her work Feeling Her Way.

== Early life and education ==
Born in Islington, London, in 1962, Boyce attended Eastlea Comprehensive School in Canning Town, East London, from 1973 to 1979. From 1979 to 1980, she completed a Foundation Course in Art & Design at East Ham College of Art and Technology, going on to earn a BA degree in Fine Art at Stourbridge College from 1980 to 1983 in the West Midlands.

== Career ==
Boyce works with a range of media including photography, installation and text. She gained prominence as part of the Black British cultural renaissance of the 1980s. Her work also references feminism. Roy Exley (2001) has written: "The effect of her work has been to re-orientate and re-negotiate the position of Black or Afro-Caribbean art within the cultural mainstream."

Boyce has said that she is influenced by the work of Sophie Calle, Adrian Piper, Valie Export, Vito Acconci, Lygia Clark, David Medalla, Art & Language, Stephen Willats, Susan Hiller and Suzanne Lacey.

An early exhibition in which Boyce participated was in 1983 at the Africa Centre, London, entitled Five Black Women. Her early works were large chalk-and-pastel drawings depicting friends, family and childhood experiences. Drawing from her background she often included depictions of wallpaper patterns and bright colours associated with the Caribbean. Through this work, the artist examined her position as a Black woman in Britain and the historical events in which that experience was rooted. She also took part in the 1983 exhibition Black Women Time Now.

In 1989, Boyce was one of four female artists selected for an exhibition called The Other Story, which was the first display of British African, Caribbean, and Asian Modernism.

In her later works, Boyce has used diverse media including digital photography to produce composite images depicting contemporary Black life. Although her focus is seen to have shifted away from specific ethnic experiences, her themes continue to be the experiences of a Black woman living in a white society, and how religion, politics and sexual politics made up that experience. She describes her later work as having "become progressively less didactic. I’m preoccupied with investigating how the artwork can have a life of its own that transcends the need to tell people what to think."

In 2018, as part of a retrospective exhibition of her art at Manchester Art Gallery, Boyce was invited by the curators of the gallery to make new work in dialogue with the collection's 18th- and 19th-century galleries, for which Boyce invited performance artists to engage with these works in these galleries in "a non-binary way". As part of one of these events, the artists decided to temporarily remove J. W. Waterhouse's painting Hylas and the Nymphs from the gallery wall, prompting a wide discussion of issues of censorship and curatorial decision-making, interpretation and judgement, by gallery audiences and in the media.

Boyce has taught widely and uses workshops as part of her creative process, and her works can be seen in many national collections. Boyce's works are held in the collections of Tate Modern, Victoria & Albert Museum, the Government Art Collection, British Council and the Arts Council Collection at the Southbank Centre.

In 2018, she was the subject of the BBC Four documentary film Whoever Heard of a Black Artist? Britain's Hidden Art History, in which Brenda Emmanus followed Boyce as she travelled the UK, highlighting the history of Black artists and modernism. Boyce led a team in preparing an exhibition at Manchester Art Gallery that focused on artists of African and Asian descent who have played a part in shaping the history of British art.

In February 2020 Boyce was selected as the first Black woman to represent the United Kingdom at the Venice Biennale; chosen by the British Council, she would produce a major solo exhibition. The British Council's director of visual arts, Emma Dexter, stated that Boyce's inclusive and powerful work would be a perfect selection for this significant time in UK history. Boyce first attended the Biennale in 2015, she was a part of curator Okwui Enwezor's "All the World's Features" exhibition. Her piece, Feeling Her Way, was awarded the Golden Lion at the 2022 exhibition.

Boyce produced Newham Trackside Wall (2021) a frieze comprising documentary photography of the buildings and streets of three neighbourhoods in Newham, a floral pattern inspired by the plants and wildlife in the local area and elements of over 300 testimonies that were collected by Boyce from 2017 to 2018. As part of the project, young people were trained in oral history to help Boyce collect these testimonies, a pub quiz was held as a way to prompt stories to be told and people could also contribute stories online.

== Honours ==
Boyce was appointed Member of the Order of the British Empire (MBE) in the 2007 Birthday Honours, Officer of the Order of the British Empire (OBE) in the 2019 New Year Honours and Dame Commander of the Order of the British Empire (DBE) in the 2024 New Year Honours, all for services to art.

On 9 March 2016, Boyce was elected as a member of the Royal Academy.

In 2024 Boyce was elected to the British Academy in London, as an Honorary Fellow (HonFBA).

== Art market ==
Boyce is represented by Hauser & Wirth and APALAZZOGALLERY, Brescia, Italy.

== Personal life ==
Boyce's partner is curator David A. Bailey, with whom she has two daughters.

In February 2023, Boyce appeared on BBC Radio 4's Desert Island Discs.

== Medium ==
In her early artistic years, Boyce used chalk and pastel to make drawings of her friends, family and herself. She graduated later to incorporate photography, graphic design, film, and caricature to convey very political messages within her work. The incorporation of collage allowed her to explore more complex pieces. Boyce's utilization of caricature within her work. The caricature is historically meant to showcase exaggerated features of individuals. They are often grotesque and can incite negative perceptions of their subjects. By using caricatures, Boyce allows herself to reclaim them in her own image.

== Message ==
"Boyce's work is politically affiliated. She utilizes a variety of mediums within the same work to convey messages revolving around Black representation, perceptions of the black body and pervasive notions that arose from scientific racism. Within her bodies of work, Boyce works to convey the personal isolation that results from being black in a white society. In her work she explores notions of the Black Body as the "other". Commonly, she uses collage to convey a body of art that incites a complicated history. Boyce rose as a prominent artist in the 1980s when the Black Cultural Renaissance took place. The movement arose out of opposition to Margaret Thatcher's brand of conservatism and her cabinet's policies. Using this societal backdrop, Boyce takes conventional narratives surrounding the black body and turns it upside down. Through her art she conveys a hope to overturn ethnographic notions of race that pervaded throughout slavery and after the slaves had been emancipated."

== Exhibitions ==
=== Solo ===
- Conversations, The Black-Art Gallery, London (1986)
- Sonia Boyce, Air Gallery, London (1986)
- Sonia Boyce: recent work, Whitechapel Art Gallery, London (1988)
- Something Else, Vanessa Devereux Gallery, London (1991)
- Do You Want To Touch?, 181 Gallery, London (1993)
- Sonia Boyce: PEEP, Royal Pavilion Art Gallery, Brighton (1995)
- Recent Sonia Boyce: La, La, La, Reed College, Portland, Oregon (2001)
- Devotional, National Portrait Gallery, London (2007)
- For you, only you (ed. Paul Bonaventura, Ruskin School of Drawing & Fine Art, Oxford University, and tour, 2007/2008)
- Crop Over, Harewood House, Leeds, and Barbados Museum & Historical Society (2007/2008)
- Like Love – Part One, Spike Island, Bristol, and tour (2009–2010);^{[20]} "Part 2 and Part 3" (2009–2010)
- Scat – Sound and Collaboration, Iniva, Rivington Place, London (2013)
- Paper Tiger Whisky Soap Theatre (Dada Nice), Villa Arson, Nice (2016)
- Manchester Art Gallery (2018)

=== Group ===
- Five Black Women, Africa Centre, London (1983)
- Black Woman Time Now, Battersea Arts Centre, London (1983)
- Strip Language, Gimpel Fils, London (1984)
- Into The Open, Mappin Art Gallery, Sheffield (1984)
- Heroes And Heroines, The Black-Art Gallery, London (1984)
- Room At The Top, Nicola Jacobs Gallery, London (1985)
- Blackskins/Bluecoat, Bluecoat Gallery, Liverpool (1985)
- Celebrations/Demonstrations, St Matthews Meeting Place, London (1985)
- No More Little White Lies, Chapter Arts Centre, Cardiff (1985)
- Reflections, Riverside Studios, London (1985)
- The Thin Black Line, ICA, London (1985)
- From Generation To Generation, Black Art Gallery, London (1985)
- Some Of Us Are Brave – All Of Us Are Strong, Black Art Gallery London (1986)
- Unrecorded Truths, Elbow Room, London (1986)
- From Two Worlds, Whitechapel Art Gallery, London (1986)
- Caribbean Expressions In Britain, Leicestershire Museum and Art Gallery (1986)
- Basel Art Fair, Switzerland (1986)
- State Of The Art, ICA, London (1986)
- A Cabinet Of Drawings, Gimpel Fils, London (1986)
- The Image Employed – The Use Of Narrative In Black Art, Cornerhouse, Manchester (1987)
- Critical Realism, Nottingham Castle Museum and Art Gallery (1987)
- Basel Art Fair, Switzerland (1987)
- Royal Overseas League, London (1987)
- The Essential Black Art, Chisenhale Gallery, London (1988)
- The Impossible Self, Winnipeg Art Gallery, Winnipeg (1988)
- The Thatcher Years, Angela Flowers Gallery, London (1988)
- Fashioning Feminine Identities, University of Essex, Colchester (1988)
- Along The Lines of Resistance, Cooper Art Gallery, Barnsley (1988)
- The Wedding, Mappin Art Gallery, Sheffield (1989)
- The Other Story, Hayward Gallery, London (1989)
- The Cuban Biennale, Wifredo Lam Cultural Centre, Havana (1989)
- The British Art Show, McLellan Galleries, Glasgow (1990)
- Distinguishing Marks, University of London (1990)
- The Invisible City, Photographers Gallery, London (1990)
- Black Markets, Cornerhouse, Manchester (1990)
- Delfina Open Studios, London (1991)
- Shocks To The System, Southbank Centre, London (1991)
- Delfina Annual Summer Show, London (1991)
- An English Summer, Palazzo della Crepadona, Belluna, Italy (1991)
- Photo Video, Photographers' Gallery, London (1991)
- Delfina Annual Summer Show, London (1992)
- White Noise, IKON Gallery, Birmingham (1992)
- Northern Adventures, Camden Arts Centre and St Pancras Station, London (1992)
- Nosepaint Artist Club, London (1992)
- Innocence And Experience, Manchester City Art Galleries (1992)
- New England Purpose Built: Long Distance Information, Real Art Ways, Hartford, USA (1993)
- Thinking Aloud, Small Mansions Art Centre, London (1994)
- Wish You Were Here, BANK, London (1994)
- Glass Vitrine, INIVA Launch, London (1994)
- Free Stories, LA Galerie, Frankfurt (1995)
- Portable Fabric Shelters, London Printworks Trust, London (1995)
- Fetishism, Brighton Museum, Brighton (1995)
- Mirage, ICA, London (1995)
- Photogenetic, Street Level, Glasgow (1995)
- Cottage Industry, Beaconsfield, London (1995)
- Picturing Blackness in British Art, Tate, London (1996)
- Kiss This, Focalpoint Gallery, Southend (1996)
- Video Positive: the Other Side of Zero, Bluecoat Gallery, Liverpool (2000)
- New Woman Narratives, World-Wide Video Festival, Amsterdam (2000)
- Century City: Art and Culture in the Modern Metropolis, Tate Modern, London (2001)
- Sharjah International Biennial: 7, Sharjah (2005)
- Menschen und Orte, Kunstverein Konstanz, Konstanz (2008)
- Praxis: Art in Times of Uncertainty, Thessaloniki Biennal 2, Greece (2009)
- Afro Modern: Journeys through the Black Atlantic, Tate Liverpool and tour (2010)
- Walls Are Talking: Wallpaper, Art and Culture, Whitworth Art Gallery, Manchester (2010)
- Griot Girlz: Feminist Art and the Black Atlantic, Kunstlerhaus Büchenhausen, Innsbruck (2010)
- ¡Afuera! Art in Public Spaces, Centro Cultural España/Cordoba, Argentina (2010)
- 8+8 Contemporary International Video Art, 53 Museum, Guangzhou (2011)
- The Impossible Community, Moscow Museum of Modern Art (2011)
- Coming Ashore, Berardo Collection Museum/P-28 Container Project, Lisbon (2011)
- Black Sound White Cube, Kunstquartier Bethanien, Berlin (2011)
- Migrations: Journeys into British Art, Tate Britain (2012)
- There is no archive in which nothing gets lost, Museum of Fine Arts, Houston (2012)
- Play! Re-capturing the Radical Imagination, Göteborg International Biennial of Contemporary Art 7 (2013)
- Keywords, Rivington Place, London (2013)
- Speaking in Tongues, CCA, Glasgow (2014)
- All the World's Futures, 56th Venice Biennale of Contemporary Art, Venice (2015)
- No Colour Bar: Black British Art in Action 1960–1990, Guildhall Art Gallery, London (2015–16)

== Selected awards and recognition ==
- 2007: appointed a Member of the Most Excellent Order of the British Empire (MBE) in the Queen's Birthday Honours List, for services to art
- 2016: elected to the Royal Academy of Arts
- 2019: appointed an Officer of the Order of the British Empire (OBE) in the New Year Honours, for services to art
- 2020: selected to represent the United Kingdom at the 59th Venice Biennale
- 2022: awarded the Venice Biennale's Golden Lion for her piece Feeling Her Way

== Research positions ==
- 1996–2002: Post-Doctoral Fellow, University of East London
- 1996–2002: Co-Director, AAVAA (the African and Asian Visual Artists Archive)
- 2004–2005: Artist Fellow, NESTA
- 2008–2011: Research Fellow, Wimbledon College of Art and Design, University of the Arts London. AHRC funded research project on the ephemeral nature of collaborative practice in art, concluding in the project The Future is Social.
- 2015–2018: Principal Investigator, Black Artists and Modernism (BAM) a research project on work by Black British artists and modernism

== Selected publications ==
- Gilane Tawadros, Sonia Boyce: Speaking in Tongues, London: Kala Press, 1997.
- Annotations 2/Sonia Boyce: Performance (ed. Mark Crinson, Iniva – the Institute of International Visual Arts, 1998)
- In 2007, Boyce, David A. Bailey and Ian Baucom jointly received the History of British Art Book Prize (USA) for the edited volume Shades of Black: Assembling Black Art in 1980s Britain, published by Duke University Press in collaboration with Iniva and AAVAA.
- Allison Thompson, "Sonia Boyce and Crop Over", Small Axe, Volume 13, Number 2, 2009.
- Like Love, Spike Island, Bristol, and tour (ed. Axel Lapp; Berlin: Green Box Press, 2010)
- Boyce co-edited the summer 2021 issue of Art History on Black British Modernism with Dorothy Price.
- John Roberts, "Interview with Sonia Boyce", Third Text, no. 1 (Autumn 1987), 55–64
- Sonia Boyce, "Talking in Tongues", in Storms of the Heart, edited by Kwesi Owusu
- Facsimile of letter by Sonia Boyce in Veronica Ryan's: Compartments/Apart-ments
