= Association for Art History =

British art organisation

Former AAH logo

The Association for Art History (AAH) (formerly Association of Art Historians) is a British organisation promoting the professional practice and public understanding of art history. Formed in 1974 as the Association of Art Historians, it rebranded in 2016. It is based in London and is a registered charity (No. 1154066).

== Membership ==
Individual membership is open to anyone with a professional commitment to and interest in art history and visual culture. Institutional membership is also available.

== Governance and financial ==
The Association is governed by a board of trustees. For the year ended 31 December 2010, the AAH had a gross income of £396,818 and expenditure of £359,507 according to accounts filed with the Charity Commission.

== Publications ==
There is a quarterly newsletter, the Bulletin, and a peer-reviewed scholarly journal Art History published five times a year in association with Wiley-Blackwell.

== Events ==
Events include an annual conference, held in April.

== Affiliations ==
The AAH is affiliated with the US College Art Association (CAA) and supports the Comité International d'Histoire de l'Art (CIHA).
