= Five Black Women =

Art exhibition

Five Black Women was an exhibition at the Africa Centre, London, featuring the work of British artists Sonia Boyce, Lubaina Himid, Claudette Johnson, Houria Niati and Veronica Ryan held in 1983. The exhibition was organised by Himid, the first of several "widely respected" exhibitions she organised featuring Black women artists.
