= Marlene Smith =

Marlene Smith may refer to:

- Marlene Smith (figure skater)
- Marlene Smith (artist)
