= Houria Niati =

Algerian artist (born 1948)

- Born: 1948 (age 77–78); Khemis Miliana, French Algeria
- Known for: Installation art
- Website: www.hourianiati.com

Houria Niati (born 1948) is an Algerian contemporary artist living in London. Niati specializes in mixed media installations that criticize Western representations and objectification of north African and Middle Eastern women. Her installations notably have live performances most commonly traditional Algerian music such as Raï, as a key visual representation of Niati's homeland and culture. Salah M. Hassan further details her performances, "She uses synthesizers, sound recordings, and special light effects to create a theatrical atmosphere and a vibrant magical environment of sound, body movement, and color." The installations and exhibitions join together paintings, sculptures, drawings, photos, soundtracks, and performances.

== Early life and career ==
Niati grew up in French-occupied Algeria, where over one million Algerians were killed for resisting occupation. When Niati was twelve years old, she demonstrated against French colonialism with her anti-colonial graffiti, which landed her in jail. Niati's experiences with the French occupation and eventual revolution of her people greatly influenced her art later in life.

Niati moved to London in the late 1970s, where she observed Western art that depicted Algerian people, especially women, in a fictionalized and exotic way. This influenced her own depictions of post-colonial cultures, nations, and people. She attended Camden Arts Centre and Croydon College of Art, and later went on to get an MA in Fine Arts at Middlesex University.

== Selected exhibitions ==
- 1983: Five Black Women, Africa Centre, London
- 1984: Into the Open: New Painting, Prints and Sculpture by Contemporary Black Artists, Mappin Art Gallery, Sheffield
- 1986: From Two Worlds, Whitechapel Gallery, London
- 1988: An Exhibition of Pastels & Paintings by Houria Niati, Africa Centre, London
- 1990: No to the Torture, first displayed at the Cartwright Hall Museum in Bradford, England, in 1990
- 1991: Four x 4, Harris Museum and Art Gallery, Preston
- 1991: Bringing Water from the Fountain, first displayed at the Harris Museum in Preston, England, 1991
- 2013: Houria Niati: Identity Search, Conway Hall, London, UK

== Publications ==
Niati, Houria (1999). "Diverse Bodies of Experiences". In Lloyd, Fran (ed). Contemporary Arab Women's Art: Dialogues of the Present. WAL Women's Art Library. ISBN 9781902770000.
