= Derek Bishton =

English journalist and photographer (born 1948)

- Born: 1948 (age 77–78); Birmingham, England
- Education: Fitzwilliam College, Cambridge
- Occupations: Journalist and photographer
- Known for: Ten.8 magazine
- Website: derekbishton.com

Derek Bishton (born 1948) is an English journalist and photographer. After periods working as a journalist on the Newcastle Evening Chronicle and the Birmingham Post, and as a publicist for the Birmingham Arts Lab, he founded the photographic magazine Ten.8 in 1979, which was published in Handsworth until 1992. Between 1996 and 2002, Bishton was the editor of the Electronic Telegraph, Europe's first daily online newspaper.

== Biography ==
Bishton was born in Birmingham, England, in 1948. In 1967, he earned a place to study English at Fitzwilliam College, Cambridge, subsequently starting a career in journalism.

In the late 1970s, together with Brian Homer and John Reardon, Bishton set up the photography and design agency Sidelines in Birmingham's inner-city district of Handsworth. He was also instrumental in establishing in 1978 the photographic journal Ten.8, which was produced until 1992.

In 1984, Bishton and Reardon published the book Home Front, which documented daily life in Handsworth, with an introduction written by Salman Rushdie.
