= Africa Centre, London =

UK organization (founded 1964)

Coordinates: 51.50298°N 0.10153°W

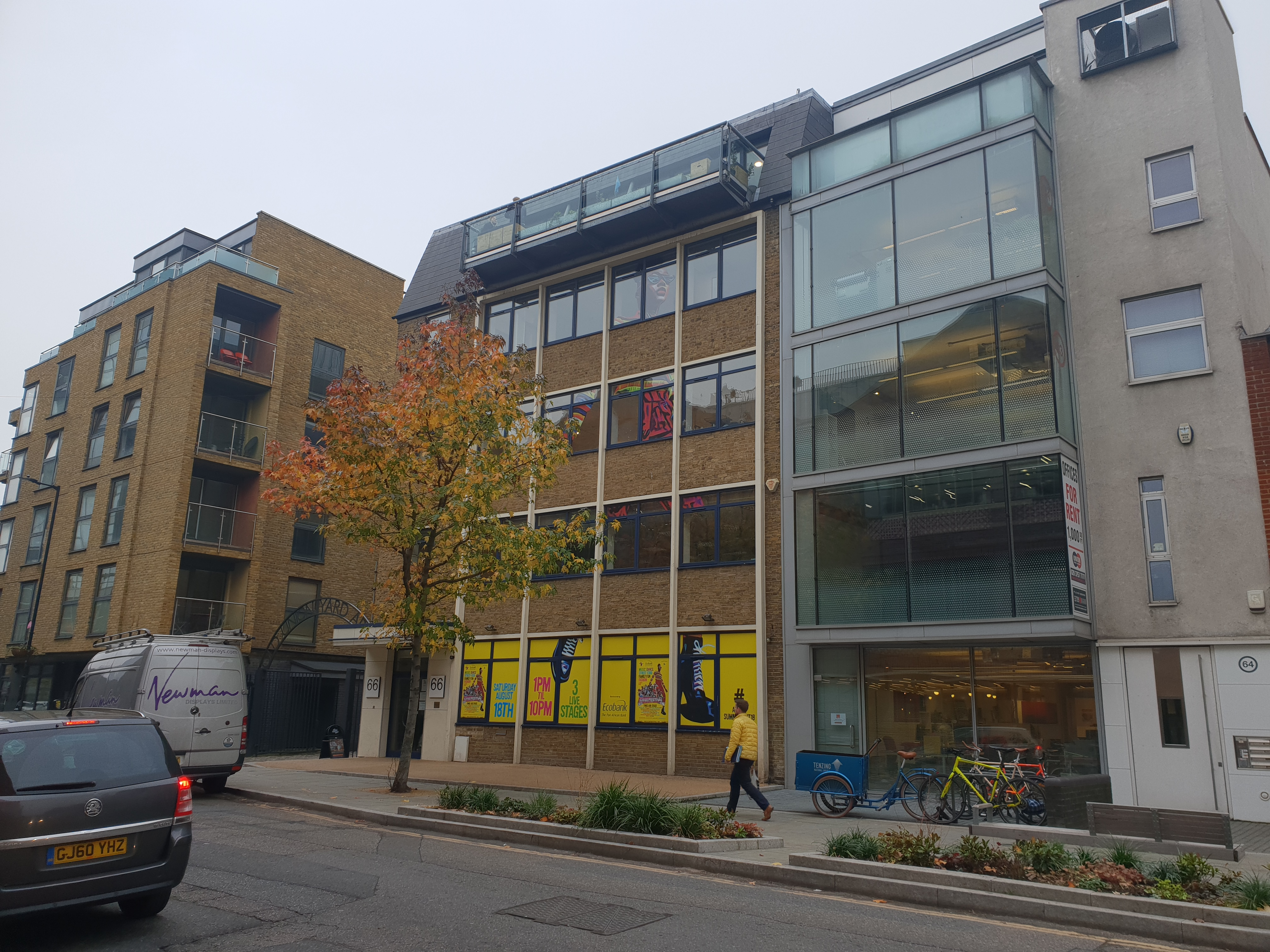
- Formation: 1964; 62 years ago
- Founder: Margaret Feeny
- Type: Charity
- Legal status: Active
- Headquarters: 66 Great Suffolk Street, Southwark
- Location: London, England
- Website: www.africacentre.org.uk

The Africa Centre, London was founded in 1964 at 38 King Street, Covent Garden, where over the years it held many art exhibitions, conferences, lectures, and a variety of cultural events, as well as housing a gallery, meeting halls, restaurant, bar and bookshop. The Africa Centre closed its original venue in 2013, and now has a permanent home at 66 Great Suffolk Street, Southwark, south London. It is a registered charity.

== History ==
The Africa Centre was opened in 1964 at a ceremony officiated by Kenneth Kaunda, the newly elected first president of Zambia, at the Grade II-listed 38 King Street. The building, which had been a banana warehouse in the 18th century and subsequently an auction house, was "given by the Catholic Church in perpetuity to the people of Africa in 1962".

The idea for the centre was conceived in 1961 by Margaret Feeny, whose aim (as described by Lloyd Bradley) was "to foster non-governmental relations between newly independent African nations by bringing people together on neutral apolitical ground. It would also maintain informal cultural links between Britain and her former colonies, while offering a friendly meeting place for Africans living in London."

Archbishop Desmond Tutu used to meet Thabo Mbeki at the bar, and described it as a home "to all who are Africans, and all those who have a care for the interests of the continent and its people". In the words of Richard Dowden, "it became The Place for African presidents, freedom fighters, writers and artists to speak and debate. You could find everything African there, from Ghanaian food to fierce debates and fantastic parties. Sometimes all three at the same time on a Saturday night; a High Life or Congolese band playing to a crammed floor of dancers while below in the basement radicals and reactionaries sipped pepper soup and argued about evolutionary versus revolutionary change. During the week there were talks about art, African dance lessons, films and plays." The Association for the Teaching of African and Caribbean Literature (ATCAL) was among the influential organisations that used the Africa Centre's facilities, holding its inaugural conference ("How to teach Caribbean and African literature in schools") there in 1979.

As noted in ModernGhana, "The Centre became a host to many debates, on issues controversial to our many nations and often ignored. Feminism, African socialism, press freedom and the media bias against Africa formed the basis of successful debates."

In the 1970s and 1980s, political movements including the Anti-Apartheid Movement would also provide the backdrop for concerts at the centre. In October 1981, South African UK-based Angelique Rockas premiered a performance of the anti-junta, anti-fascist drama El Campo (The Camp) by Griselda Gambaro.

The Centre has had a long association with music. In 1975, Wala Danga, a Zimbabwean promoter and sound engineer, organised his first club night there. He told Lloyd Bradley, "The Africa Centre was unique... One of the first places that people from different African countries really used to mix, because for a lot of the African students it was like a home away from home." Due to popular demand, Danga's club nights led to the birth of the "Limpopo Club" in 1983. The club, which ran for over two decades, hosted numerous future icons such as Youssou N'Dour, Angélique Kidjo, and Salif Keita. From 1985 to 1989, Jazzie B brought his Soul II Soul sound system, which acquired "legendary status". He was one of the voices against the closure of the Covent Garden site during the Save The Africa Centre campaign. Danga died on 25 November 2022.

The Centre held frequent exhibitions. Five Black Women in 1983, with Sonia Boyce, Claudette Johnson, Lubaina Himid, Houria Niati and Veronica Ryan, was the first "widely respected" exhibition featuring black women artists. In 2005, the London Art and Artists Guide described it as a "very lively arts centre" that held classes in dance, movement, and literature, and hosted meetings in the evenings; and The Calabash, London's first African restaurant, was considered "well worth a visit". The bookshop sold books published only in Africa, as well as "excellent handicrafts and sculpture". A large mural by Malangatana Ngwenya that decorated the stairwell of the centre's original building in Covent Garden has now been installed in The Africa Centre's new premises in Southwark.

=== Move from 38 King Street, Covent Garden ===
In August 2012, the building at King Street was sold to a property developer. This was despite a concerted campaign to keep The Africa Centre at its original base. The campaign was supported by Archbishop Desmond Tutu, Wole Soyinka, Ngugi Wa Thiong'o, Yinka Shonibare, Bonnie Greer, Sokari Douglas Camp among many other notable figures. Following significant multi-million pound funding from the Mayor of London's Good Growth Fund and the Arts Council England, The Africa Centre completed the refurbishment of its new premises on Great Suffolk Street in Southwark, in 2022. The Centre was officially reopened on 9 June 2022.

In 2018, Kenneth Olumuyiwa Tharp was appointed as director of the Africa Centre, holding the position until a management restructure in 2020. Led by Board Chair Oba Nsugbe, appointed in 2012 and the charity's longest serving trustee as of August 2026, the Centre operated without a Chief Executive from 2020 until the appointment of Olu Alake in October 2023. Oba Nsugbe acted as the de facto CEO in the meantime.

The Africa Centre used to host a popular annual Summer Festival in Covent Garden on the Piazza, since 2013 and continued for a few years in Southwark. The last one was held in the summer 2018.

A 60th-anniversary programme was announced in March 2024. In a public appeal in October 2024, the Centre announced that it was facing financial struggles. This is also reflected in its public filing.

=== Closure of the Southwark base ===
On Tuesday 28th July 2026, The Africa Centre issued a brief statement on its website stating that "due to circumstances beyond its control, the building would be temporarily closed, with a view to reopening as soon as possible." However, later the same week, a statement on the charity's website that was subsequently unpublished, announced that the Board of Trustees had a reached a difficult decision to sell the new Southwark base. The statement said an extensive internal review had concluded that the charity's financial model was "unsustainable" due to rising costs, declining unrestricted income and the expense of maintaining the building.

An investigative news report by independent platform Black Current News emerged disclosing that in fact, a financial crisis and major governance concerns had resulted in the abrupt closure of the 60 year old institution's new HQ in Southwark, London. Concerned members of the community expressed that the silence from Charity's Board and management during such a crisis did not bode well.

In the latest published accounts, auditors had warned of a material uncertainty raising significant doubt about whether the charity would continue to operate and meet its financial obligations.

Following publication of the investigative report, The Africa Centre responded by publishing a backdated statement on its website announcing a new fund-raising campaign and stating that its legacy has never been defined by bricks and mortar and that it is exploring options for the future stewardship of its Southwark property. The options may include an outright sale, a sale and leaseback, or a shared ownership model among the community.

== Centre directors ==
- Margaret Feeny (1964–1978)
- Alastair Niven (1978–1984)
- Nigel Watt (1984–1991)
- Adotey Bing (1992–2006)
- Kenneth Olumuyiwa Tharp (2018–2020)
- Olu Alake (2023–present)
