= Maggie Humm =

English feminist academic

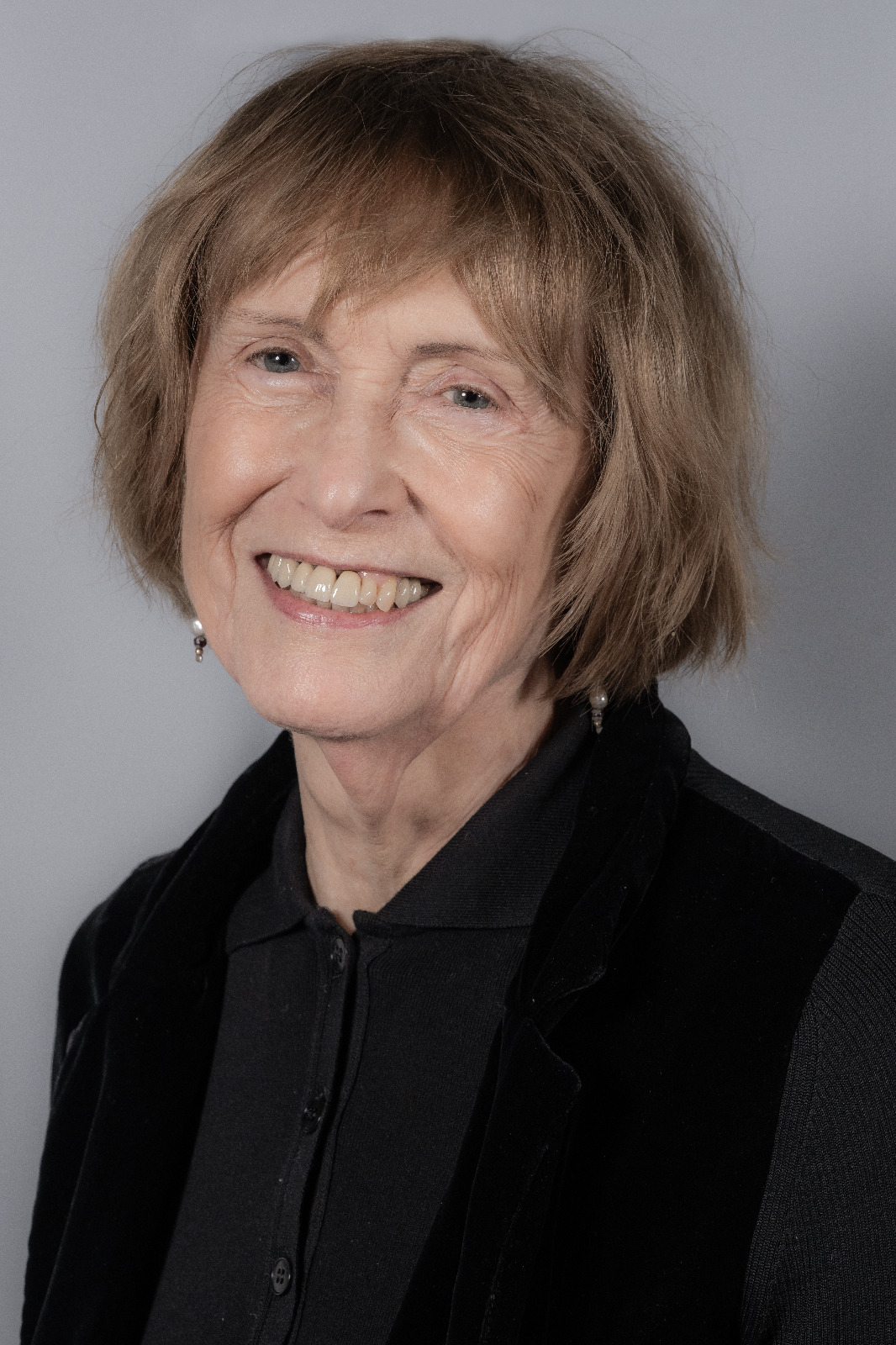
- Born: 1945 (age 80–81); England
- Education: University of East Anglia; King's College London
- Occupations: Academic; Author
- Notable work: Talland House (2020)
- Website: www.maggiehumm.net

Maggie Humm (born 1945) is an English feminist academic and emeritus professor of cultural studies at the University of East London. She has written on feminism and modernism, particularly the work of Virginia Woolf.

== Early life and education ==
Humm was born in 1945 in England. She was educated at the University of East Anglia, graduating in 1966 as part of its founding class in English studies. She earned a Ph.D. from King's College London in 1980, focusing on Paul Goodman, and obtained a diploma in creative writing from the University of East Anglia in 2016.

== Career ==
Humm's research introduced her to the United States, where she has served as a visiting scholar and professor at the University of Massachusetts, the University of California San Diego, Stanford University, and Rutgers University.

Humm was co-chair of the British Women's Studies Association (now known as Feminist Studies) and founded the first full-time undergraduate Women's Studies degree in the UK. She is currently the vice-chair of the Virginia Woolf Society of Great Britain.

In 2022, after a four-year campaign, the St. Ives Council agreed to place a plaque honouring Virginia Woolf on Talland House, Woolf's childhood home.

== Writing ==
Humm's writing primarily focuses on the concept of women's writing as inherently connected to its cultural production. Her books and essays chart the evolution of feminist criticism since the publication of Feminist Criticism in 1986, reflecting changes over the course of her academic career. Humm has engaged with a range of theories and ideas—including the "anxiety of influence," écriture féminine, postmodernism, and life-writing—guided by the belief that subjectivity and creativity are essential to nonfiction writing. Central to her discussions is the work of Virginia Woolf, whose influence spans both scholarly circles and popular culture. Humm's work explores Woolf's relationship with feminism, popular culture, and twentieth-century women's writing across forty years of criticism.

Humm's novel Talland House was chosen by the Washington Independent Review of Books as one of 51 'books of the year' for 2020. It was a finalist in the 2021 Next Generation Indie Book Awards for Historical Fiction (post-1900s) and was shortlisted for the 2021 Eric Hoffer Award Grand Prize. In 2024, it received the Women's Fiction International Impact Book Award. The novel features Lily Briscoe from Virginia Woolf's To the Lighthouse and is set between 1900 and 1919 in Cornwall and London. It follows Lily's journey to becoming a professional artist, including her relationships, mourning her mother, and investigating Mrs. Ramsay’s death.

Humm's second novel, Radical Woman: Gwen John & Rodin, focuses on the tumultuous relationship between artists Gwen John and Auguste Rodin. It was longlisted for the Yeovil Literary Prize in 2020 under the title Rodin's Mistress and was a finalist in both the Page Turner Writing Award in 2022 and the American Writing Awards for Women's Fiction in 2023. The novel won the Bookfest Women's Historical Fiction award in 2023.

== Bibliography ==
- An Annotated Critical Bibliography of Feminist Criticism. Brighton: Harvester Press, 1984.
- Feminist Criticism: Women As Contemporary Critics. New York: St. Martin's Press, 1986.
- The Dictionary of Feminist Theory. New York: Harvester Wheatsheaf, 1989.
- Border Traffic: Strategies of Contemporary Women Writers. Manchester: Manchester University Press.
- (ed.) Modern Feminisms: Political, Literary, Cultural. New York: Columbia University Press, 1992.
- A Reader's Guide to Contemporary Feminist Literary Criticism. New York: Harvester Wheatsheaf, 1994.
- Practising Feminist Criticism: An Introduction. New York: Harvester Wheatsheaf, 1995.
- Feminism and Film. Bloomington: Indiana University Press, 1997.
- Modernist Women and Visual Cultures: Virginia Woolf, Vanessa Bell, Photography, and Cinema. Edinburgh: Edinburgh University Press, 2002.
- Snapshots of Bloomsbury: The Private Lives of Virginia Woolf and Vanessa Bell. London: Tate, 2006.
- (ed.) The Edinburgh Companion to Virginia Woolf and the Arts. Edinburgh: Edinburgh University Press, 2010.
- (ed. with Debra Benita Shaw) Radical Space: Exploring Politics and Practice. London: Rowman & Littlefield International, 2015.
- Talland House: A Novel. Berkeley, CA: She Writes Press, 2020.
- Radical Woman: Gwen John & Rodin. Brighton: EER publishing 2022.
- The Bloomsbury Photographs. London: Yale University Press, 2024.
