= Ingrid Pollard =

British artist and photographer (born 1953)

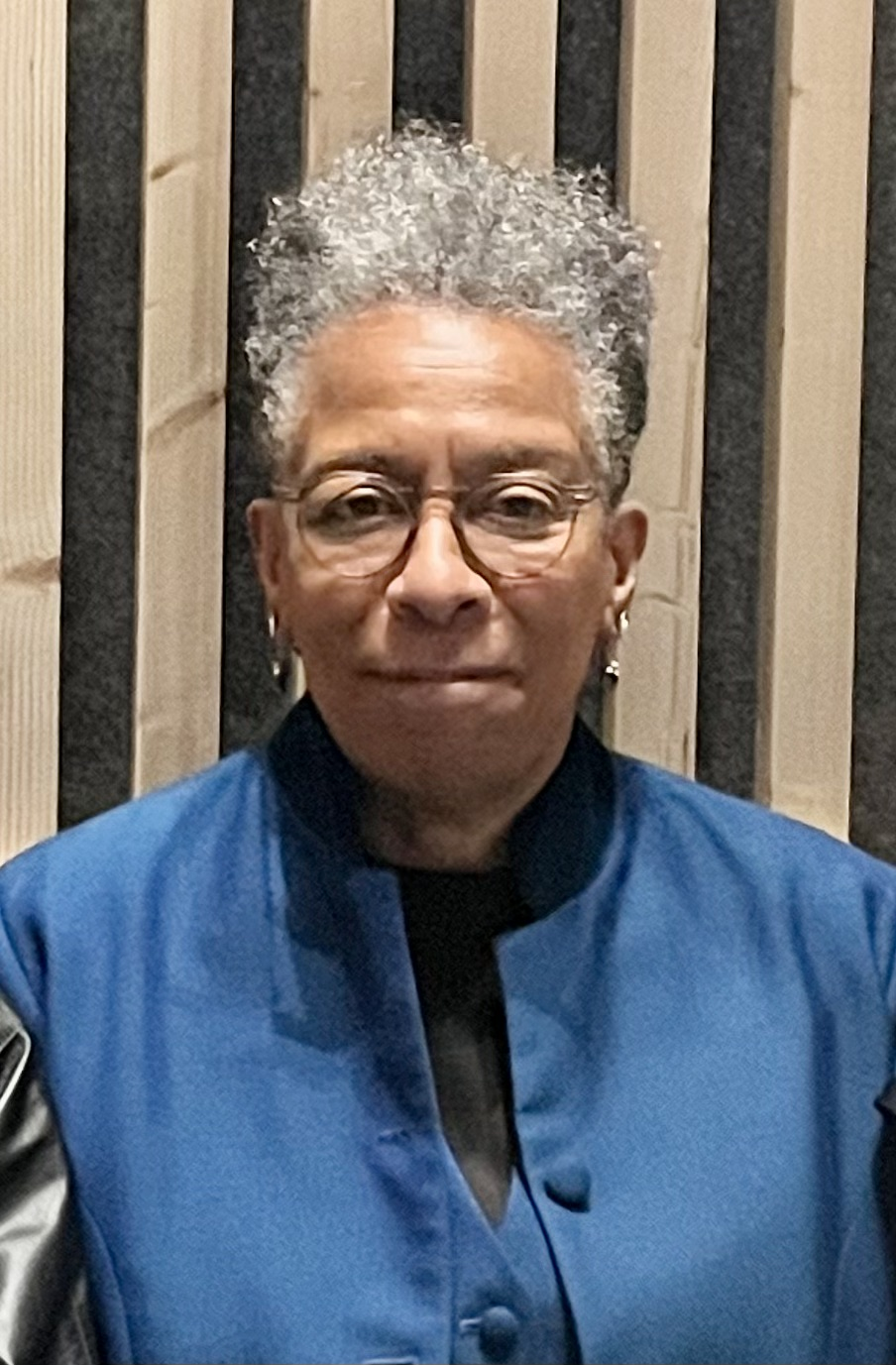
- Pollard in 2024
- Born: 1953 (age 72–73); Georgetown, Guyana
- Education: London College of Printing; University of Derby; University of Westminster
- Occupations: Artist and photographer
- Known for: Co-founder of Autograph ABP
- Website: www.ingridpollard.com

Ingrid Pollard MBE (born 1953) is a British artist and photographer. Her work uses portraiture photography and traditional landscape imagery to explore social constructs such as Britishness or racial difference. Pollard is associated with Autograph, the Association of Black Photographers. She lives and works in London.

In the 1980s, Pollard produced a series of photographs of black people in rural landscapes, entitled Pastoral Interludes. The works challenge the way that English culture places black people in cities.

From 2005 to 2007, she curated Tradewinds2007, an international residency exhibition project with an exhibition at the Museum of London Docklands. She has participated in group exhibitions at the Hayward Gallery and the Victoria & Albert Museum.

Pollard has worked as an artist in residence at a number of organisations, including Lee Valley Park Authority, London (1994), Cumbria National Park (1998), Wysing Arts, Cambridge (2000), Chenderit School, Oxfordshire (2008), and Croydon College (2011). She has also held numerous teaching positions and is currently a lecturer in Photography at Kingston University. Pollard is a member of the Mapping Spectral Traces research group. In 2016 she was awarded an Honorary Fellowship of the Royal Photographic Society. In 2018, she was the inaugural Stuart Hall Associate Fellow at the University of Sussex.

== Life ==
=== Childhood ===
Pollard was born in Georgetown, Guyana, in 1953. When she was three or four years old, her family emigrated to the United Kingdom, where her father already lived, and she grew up in London. She has described her youthful awareness of family photographs.

"I do not remember the first time I took a photograph, but I did grow up in a house of family photo-albums and the stories that went with them. My father took lots of pictures for our albums and later I used some of these images in my own work."

Pollard began to make her own pictures using her father's box camera. As a teenager in the late 1960s, she photographed woods and sewage works in the Lea Valley, East London, for a school Geography project, a foretaste of her mature photographic work examining the landscape.

=== Early career and education ===
As a young artist, Pollard became increasingly interested in liberation movements around race, gender and sexuality. In the early 1980s, she worked at the Lenthall Road Workshop, a feminist photography and screen-printing collective in the Haggerston area of Hackney, East London. She was one of twenty founding members of Autograph ABP (the Association of Black Photographers) in 1988.

Pollard has participated several exhibitions that brought together work by Black British artists, including Black Women Time Now (Battersea Arts Centre, London, 1984), The Thin Black Line (ICA, London, 1985) and Three Black Women Photographers (Commonwealth Institute, London, 1986).

Pollard completed a BA degree in Film and Video at the London College of Printing in 1988 and, between 1986 and 1993, worked on the technical crew for a small number of film projects. Her photography was recognised in a survey edition of Birmingham's Ten.8 magazine She then went on to complete an MA in Photographic Studies at Derby University in 1995. She was awarded a PhD by publication by University of Westminster in 2016.

== Work ==
In the 1980s, Pollard began to attract attention for her photographic series, particularly those exploring the presence of black people in the English landscape, including Pastoral Interlude (1987–1988), Seaside Series (1989), Wordsworth's Heritage (1992) and Self Evident (1995). In these series, she worked with material that evoked notions of heritage or played upon nostalgic sentiments associated with the national landscape: the souvenir postcard, the poetry of William Wordsworth and hand-tinted photographs. She often placed text statements and quotations alongside her images to suggest a political framework for her photographic work. Developing such forms allowed Pollard to challenge perceptions of the countryside as being primarily inhabited and visited by white people, and the related assumption that Black British people only exist in popular consciousness in urban settings.

These racially specific stereotypes of rural England are set out in the caption attached to the first image of Pastoral Interlude:

"... it's as if the Black experience is only lived within an urban environment: I thought I liked the Lake District where I wandered lonely as a Black face in a sea of white. A visit to the countryside is always accompanied by a feeling of unease, dread..."

From 2005 to 2008, Pollard was engaged in a research project into the "Black Boy", a name which was once used for some pubs in England. This led to the publication of Pollard's 2008 book, Hidden in a Public Place, and a solo exhibition, Spectre of the Black Boy (Kingsway Corridor, Goldsmiths University of London, 2009).

== Honours, awards and recognition ==
Pollard was awarded an Honorary Fellowship of the Royal Photographic Society in 2016.

In 2018, Pollard was the inaugural Stuart Hall Associate Fellow at the University of Sussex.

In 2022 Pollard was one of four artists nominated for the Turner Prize.

Pollard was appointed Member of the Order of the British Empire (MBE) in the 2023 New Year Honours for services to art.

She was awarded the Hasselblad Award in 2024.

== Bibliography ==
=== Publications by Pollard ===
- Hidden Histories: Heritage Stories. 1994. With an essay by Lola Young and an interview with Liz Wells. Exhibition catalogue.
- Near and Far. 2001. With an essay by Susan Trangmar. Exhibition catalogue.
- Postcard Home. Chris Boot and Autograph ABP, 2004.
- Hidden in Public Place. Occasional Papers series. London South Bank University, 2008. With an introduction by Andrew Dewdney.
- Regarding the Frame. Visual Arts in Rural Communities, 2013. With an essay by Carole McKay. Exhibition catalogue.
- Consider the Light and the Dark. Chateau de Sacy, France: Ateliers d'artistes de Sac, 2015. With an essay by Ella Mills. Exhibition catalogue.

=== Publications with contributions by Pollard ===
- Passion, edited by Maud Sulter. Urban Fox, 1990. With a chapter of images by Pollard.
- Stolen Glances, edited by Tessa Boffin and Jean Fraser. Pandora Press/Harper Collins, 1991. ISBN 0-04-440707-6. With a chapter of images by Pollard.
- New Geographies of Race and Racism, edited by Caroline Bressey and Claire Dyer. Ashgate, 2009. Pollard contributes a chapter, "Belonging in Britain-Fathers Hands".

=== Publications with interviews with Pollard ===
- Polareyes: A Journal by and about Black Women working in photography. Edited by Maxine Walker, Molly Shinhat, Mumtaz Karimjee, Jenny McKenzie, Amina Patel, Samena Rana, Similola Coker, Brenda Agard, Lesley Mitchell. Issue No. 1, 1987. "Ingrid Pollard talks to Molly Shinhat", page 41.

== Collections ==
Pollard's work is held in the following public collections:

- Arts Council Collection
- Victoria and Albert Museum
- Tate
