= Art History (journal) =

- Discipline: Art history
- Language: English
- Edited by: Dorothy Price

Publication details
- History: 1978–present
- Publisher: Wiley (UK)
- Frequency: 5/year

Standard abbreviations
- ISO 4: Art Hist.

Indexing
- ISSN: 0141-6790 (print); 1467-8365 (web)
- LCCN: 80646761
- OCLC no.: 3952807

Links
- Journal homepage; Online access; Online archive

Art History, academic journal of the Association for Art History, is an international forum for peer-reviewed scholarship and innovative research. Founded in 1978, the journal publishes essays, critical reviews, and special issues that engage with path-breaking new developments and critical debate in the field of art history. Art History covers various genres of art and visual culture across all time periods and geographical areas. The journal welcomes contributions from the full spectrum of methodological perspectives, and serves as a forum for a wide range of historical, critical, historiographical and theoretical writing.
