= David A. Bailey =

British Afro-Caribbean curator, photographer and writer (born 1961)

David A. Bailey MBE
- Born: 1961 (age 64–65); London, England
- Occupations: Curator, photographer, writer and cultural facilitator
- Partner: Sonia Boyce
- Children: 2

David A. Bailey MBE (born 1961), is a British Afro-Caribbean curator, photographer, writer and cultural facilitator, living and working in London. Among his main concerns are the notions of diaspora and black representation in art.

== Biography ==
Bailey was born in London in 1961. He became active in the Black British arts scene in the 1980s. A member of the D-Max photography group, he designed the catalogue for their 1987 show at the Ikon Gallery in Birmingham. He also collaborated with the Sankofa Film and Video Collective, advising on productions including The Passion of Remembrance (1986) and Looking for Langston (1988).

In 1995, Bailey curated Mirage: Enigmas of Race, Difference, and Desire at the Institute of Contemporary Arts. In 1997 he co-curated Rhapsodies in Black: Art of the Harlem Renaissance with Richard J. Powell at the Hayward Gallery in London and the Corcoran Gallery of Art in Washington, D.C.. He co-curated the 2005 exhibition Back to Black – Art, Cinema and the Racial Imaginary with Petrine Archer-Straw and Richard J. Powell at Whitechapel Art Gallery in London.

Bailey has extensively written about photography and film. In 1992, he co-edited an issue of Ten.8 with Stuart Hall, "The critical decade: black British photography in the 1980s". From 1996 to 2002, he was co-director of the African and Asian Visual Artists Archive (AAVAA) at the University of East London. Until the end of 2009, he was Senior Curator of Autograph ABP, and Curator of the organisation PLATFORM's Remember Saro-Wiwa Living Memorial. He is founder and director of the International Curators Forum (ICF) and currently is acting director of the National Art Gallery of The Bahamas in Nassau.

Bailey curated the exhibition Life Between Islands: Caribbean-British Art 1950s-Now, shown at Tate Britain from 1 December 2021 to 3 April 2022.

Bailey was awarded an MBE in the Queen's Birthday Honours List 2007, for services to the visual arts.

== Personal life ==
Bailey's partner is artist Sonia Boyce and the couple have two daughters.
