= Sutapa Biswas =

British Indian conceptual artist (born 1962)

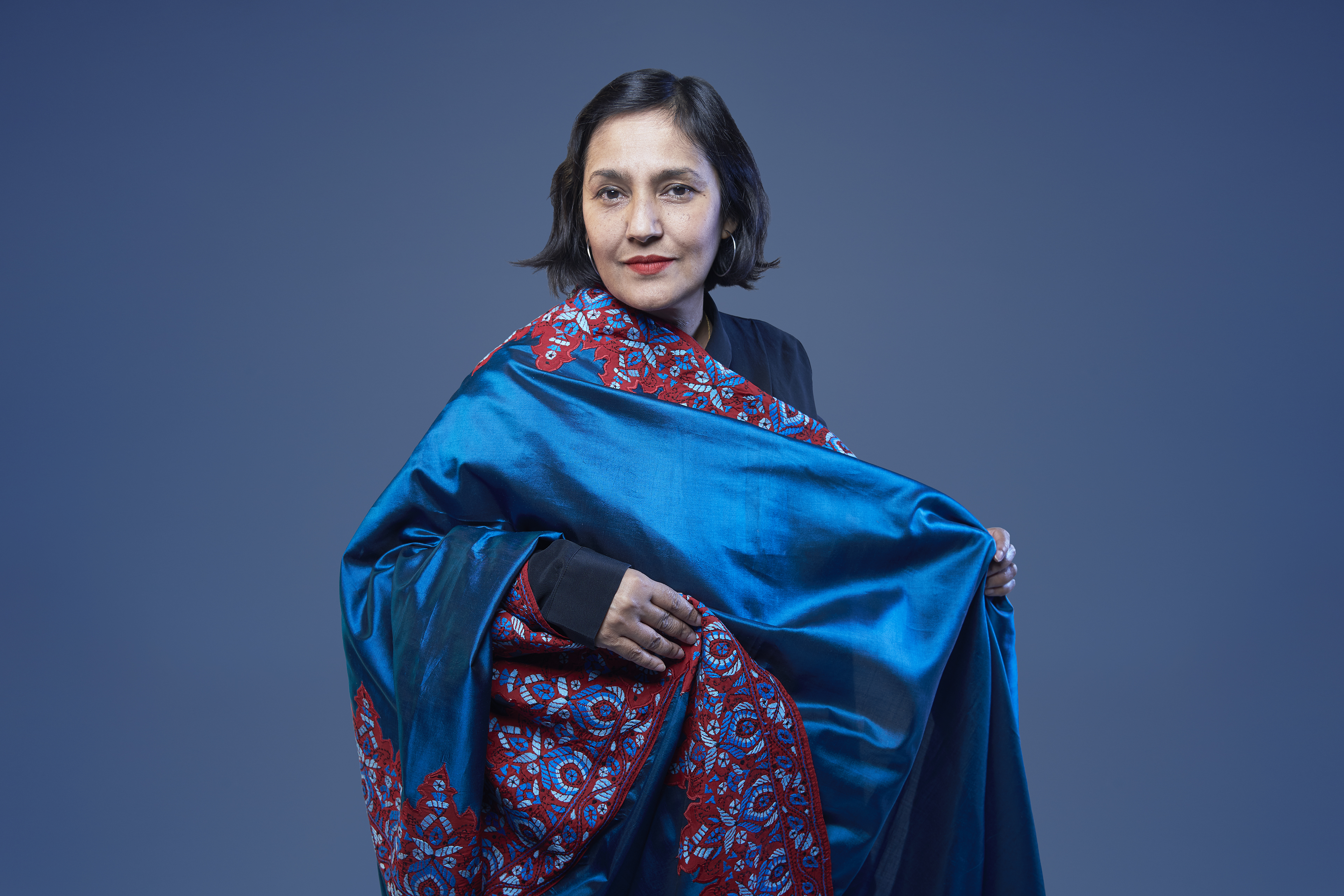
- Born: 28 November 1962 (age 63); Shantiniketan, West Bengal, India
- Occupation: Conceptual artist
- Website: sutapabiswas.com

Sutapa Biswas (born 28 November 1962) is a British Indian conceptual artist, who works across a range of media including painting, drawing, film and time-based media.

== Early life ==
She was born a Mahishya family in Shantiniketan, West Bengal, India, in 1962. At the age of four, she moved to London, England, with her family, and grew up in Southall. Between 1981 and 1985, she studied at the University of Leeds for her BFA. She then studied art the Slade School of Art in London from 1988 to 1990. From 1996 to 1998, Biswas studied at the Royal College of Art.

== Career ==
As a conceptual artist, Biswas works in a variety of mediums, including performance, film, photography and installation. During the 1980s, Biswas was primarily a painter. For instance, her paintings Housewives with Steak-Knives (1985) and Through Rose-Tinted Windows form part of the Bradford Museums and Galleries permanent collections on display at Cartwright Hall. She also worked in video. Kali (1984) is a 30-minute video that the artist made while a student at the University of Leeds. It documents a performance by the artist as Kali and her fellow student as Ravan. Kali – whose name means the "black one" – is the Hindu goddess of time and change and within Hindu mythology she was created to inhabit more than one representation (hence her multiple appearances in the performance) to rid the world of evil, which is here embodied by Ravan. Biswas often draws from myths and iconography from ancient Hindu mythologies, speaking of the symbolism she says: "I want people to research into my culture, as I've been doing into European and Western culture." In 1985, Biswas's work was exhibited at the Institute of Contemporary Arts, London, in the exhibition The Thin Black Line, an exhibition of young Black and Asian women artists curated by Lubaina Himid.

Sutapa Biswas's works often reflect on questions of gender and cultural and ethnic identity. For instance, her film Birdsong captures the story of young Indian boy who longs to own a horse and is filmed against the backdrop of an English period home. Biswas is also keen to use humour and satire in her work. In her painting "The Last Mango in Paris", depicting two women talking and peeling mangoes, the caption below reads: M: "If you were to be re-born, and had a choice what would you come back as?" B: "If I were to be reborn again, I would be born an English dog, because in England they look after their dogs really well." She is keen to use her work as a platform for people to begin to address their own racism. Biswas was the 2008 Andrew W. Mellon Fellow at the Yale Centre for British Art, and is a European Photography Award nominee. She is currently a Reader Fine Art at Manchester Metropolitan University, UK.

== Collections ==
Biswas's work is held in the following public collection:

- Tate, London

== Exhibitions ==
=== Solo exhibitions ===
- 1987: Sutapa Biswas, Horizon Gallery, London
- 1992: Synapse: Sutapa Biswas, The Photographers' Gallery, London, (texts by Gilane Twaadros and David Chandler).
- 2021: Lumen, Sutapa Biswas, BALTIC Contemporary
- 2021: Lumen Sutapa Biswas, Kettle's Yard, Cambridge

=== Group exhibitions ===
- 1985: The Thin Black Line, [Selected by Lubaina Himid], Institute of Contemporary Arts, London
- 1986: The Issue of Painting, Rochdale Art Gallery.
- 1986: Jagrati, Greenwich Citizens Gallery, London
- 1986: Unrecorded Truths, The Elbow Room, London
- 1987: Creation For Liberation 4th Open Exhibition: Art by Black Artists, Brixton Village, London
- 1987: Critical Realism: Britain in the 1980's through the Work of 28 Artists, Nottingham Castle Museum, Nottingham
- 1987: State Of The Art: Ideas And Images in The 1980s, Institute of Contemporary Arts, London
- 1987: The Image Employed: The Use of Narrative in Black Art
- 1988: Along the Lines of Resistance: an Exhibition of Contemporary Feminist Art, [Selected by Sutapa Biswas, Sarah Edge and Clare Slattery], Cooper Gallery, Barnsley
- 1988: The Essential Black Art, Chisenhale Gallery, London
- 1988: Graven Images: Art, Religion and Politics, Harris Museum and Art Gallery, Preston
- 1989: Fabled Territories: New Asian Photography in Britain, City Art Gallery, Leeds
- 1989: The Artist Abroad: An Exhibition of Work Influenced by International Travel, Usher Gallery, Lincoln
- 1989: Intimate Distance, The Photographers' Gallery, London
- 1989: The Other Story: Afro-Asian Artists in Post-War Britain, Hayward Gallery, London
- 1990: Disputed Identities, Camerawork, San Francisco
- 1992: Fine Material for a Dream...?: A Reappraisal of Orientalism: 19th & 20th Century Fine Art and Popular Culture Juxtaposed with Paintings, Video and Photography by Contemporary Artists, Harris Museum & Art Gallery, Preston
- 1992: The Circular Dance, Arnolfini, Bristol
- 1992: Who Do You Take Me For?, Institute of Modern Art, Brisbane
- 1993: Beyond Destination: Film and Video Installations by South Asian Artists, Ikon Gallery, Birmingham
- 1993: Disrupted Borders, Arnolfini, Bristol
- 2023: Women in Revolt!: Art and Activism in the UK 1970-1990, Tate Britain, London
- 2024: The Time of Our Lives, The Drawing Room, London
