= Veronica Ryan =

Montserrat-born British artist (born 1956)

Veronica Ryan OBE RA
- Born: Veronica Maudlyn Ryan; 1956 (age 69–70); Plymouth, Montserrat
- Education: St. Albans College of Art and Design; Bath Academy of Art; Slade School of Fine Art; SOAS (MPhil)
- Notable work: Custard Apple (Annonaceae), Breadfruit (Moraceae) and Soursop (Annonaceae) (2021)
- Awards: OBE (2021); Turner Prize (2022)
- Elected: Royal Academician (2022)

Veronica Maudlyn Ryan OBE RA (born 1956) is a Montserrat-born British sculptor. Her work is associated with the British Black Arts Movement, particularly through her participation in the exhibitions curated by Lubaina Himid: Black Women Time Now (1983), Five Black Women Artists (1983) and The Thin Black Line (1985). In 2022, Ryan won the Turner Prize.

Ryan lives and works between New York and Bristol.

== Early life and education ==
Ryan was born in 1956 in Plymouth, Montserrat, the eldest of eight children. Her parents grew up in the Caribbean; her mother in the countryside, her father in the town.

Ryan became interested in art in her school years. In particular, she remembers making a Christmas tree in infant school and being inspired by the creative use of materials in a minimalistic way. Ryan also cites her mother's patchwork as an inspiration for her art, and she learnt to sew and knit from an early age.

Ryan studied at Hertfordshire College of Art and Design (1974–75), then Bath Academy of Art (1975–78) for her undergraduate degree.

From 1978-80, Ryan studied at the Slade School of Fine Art, University College London. Whilst there, she spent significant time in the nearby British Museum looking in the Egyptology section and looking at African, Asian and other early objects, which informed her work.

In 1980, Ryan was awarded a Boise Travelling Scholarship from the Slade. This allowed her to visit Nigeria. There, she became especially interested in the re-adaptation of everyday consumables, including food and ephemeral waste materials, into fetishes used in spiritual offerings and shrines. The trip inspired her to continue her studies with an MPhil degree in art history at the School for Oriental and African Studies (SOAS), which she took from 1981-83.

== Career ==
Ryan completed her studies at the beginning of the 1980s, a time marked by the rise of the British Black Arts Movement. In 1983, she took part in the exhibition Black Women Time Now, curated by Lubaina Himid, and later Five Black Women Artists, at the Africa Centre, also curated by Himid. Her participation in The Thin Black Line (ICA, London, 1985, curated by Lubaina Himid) and From Two Worlds (Whitechapel Gallery, London; Fruitmarket Gallery, Edinburgh, 1986), meant that she became associated with a broader anti-racist movement. Later, she felt the need to clarify that her work should not be pinned exclusively to race. "All along I have had various people be very critical of me because I did not fit into their politicized agenda," she said.

In 1984, Ryan had her first solo show at the Tom Allen Centre.

Ryan was in residence at Tate St Ives in 1998 and 2000–01, when she worked in the former studio of Barbara Hepworth and used marble gifted by the Hepworth Estate.

In June 2017, Ryan had a residency at The Art House, Wakefield, where she re-examined her connection with Barbara Hepworth in relation to themes of ancestral history, domesticity and memory.

In 2018, Ryan was awarded the Freelands Award by the Freelands Foundation, for the exhibition Along a Spectrum at Spike Island, Bristol in Autumn 2020

Ryan was appointed Officer of the Order of the British Empire (OBE) in the 2021 Birthday Honours for services to art.

In December 2022, Ryan won the Turner Prize for her "really poetic" work.

== Sculpture ==
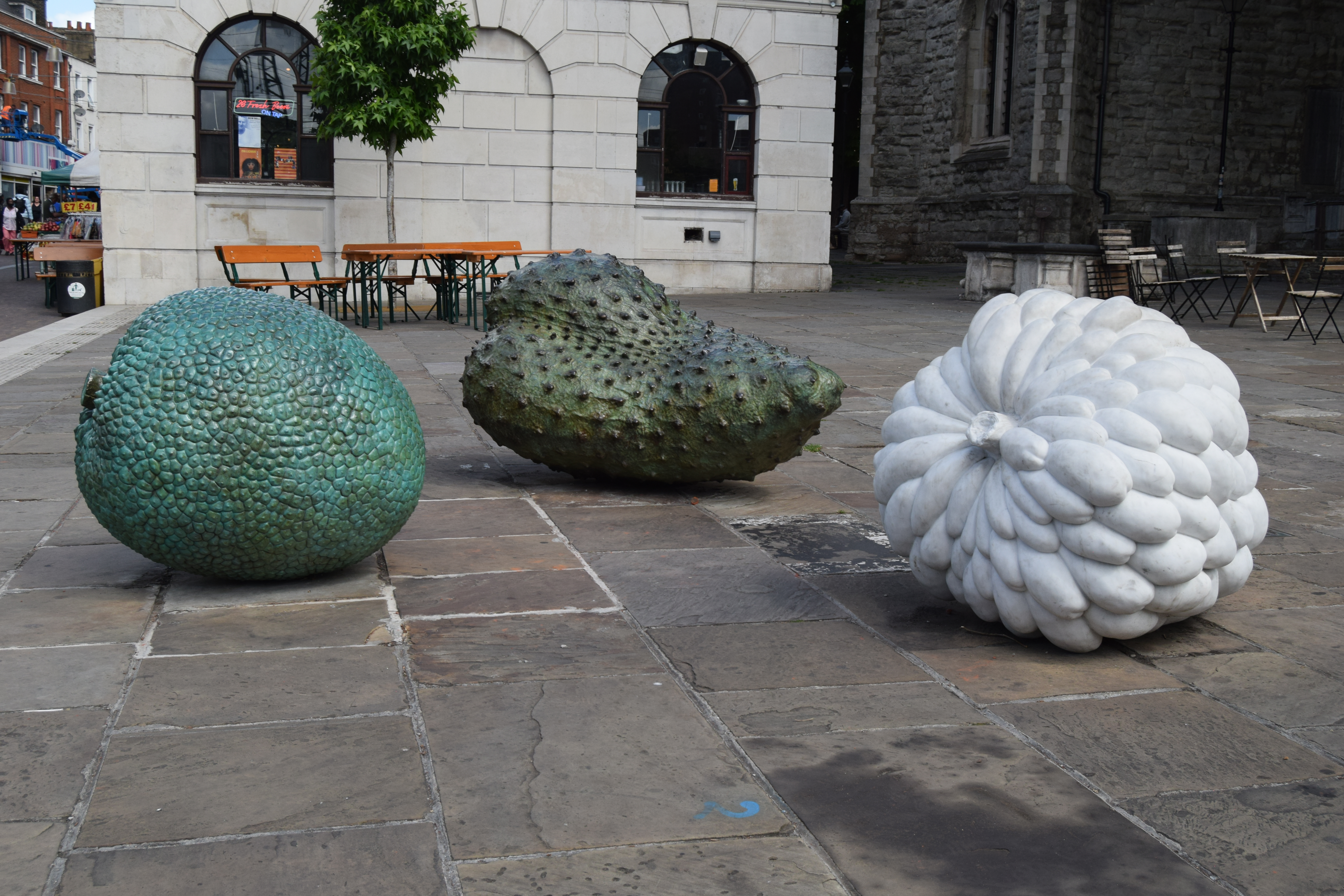
Custard Apple (Annonaceae), Breadfruit (Moraceae) and Soursop (Annonaceae) in Hackney, London

Ryan's preferred materials range from heavy ones like cement, bronze, lead and painted plaster, to lighter and more ephemeral ones like paper, dust, flowers and feathers. Her sculptures are abstract and tend towards the biomorphic, appealing to organic forms like pods, shells, husks and seeds. Relics in the Pillow of Dreams (1985) is exemplary of this aesthetic. The organic nature of Ryan's work is accentuated by its direct placement on the floor, without a plinth.

Key is also the relationship between the container and the content, and therefore between the interior and exterior dimension. In an article published to coincide with her exhibition at Camden Arts Centre and Angel Row Gallery, Ryan explains how her small studio in New York is also a representation of the container, and as such a sculptural environment in which daily accumulations, dust heaps, deposits become the preoccupations in the work. Conceptually, Ryan draws on a combination of personal experience, ancestral history and the natural environment. A product of the British Caribbean diaspora, she is particularly attentive to questions of origins, memory, and belonging in relation to place and landscape. Domesticity, maternity and the role of women in society are also interrogated in her sculptures.

On 1 October 2021, Ryan's three-piece, marble and bronze work Custard Apple (Annonaceae), Breadfruit (Moraceae) and Soursop (Annonaceae), depicting three Caribbean fruits, was unveiled in the London Borough of Hackney as London's first permanent public monument celebrating the Windrush generation, and the first permanent public sculpture by a black female artist in the UK. The triptych received the 2022 Marsh Award for Excellence in Public Sculpture.

=== Influences ===
From the outset, Ryan was keen to break out of the mould of British modernism as it was then taught by drawing on a wider range of female sculptors and artists of colour for inspiration. New Beacon Books was where Ryan went to find information about non-Western artists and artists of colour. Among her earliest influences was the German-born American sculptor Eva Hesse, whose work she saw first-hand in 1979, when the exhibition Eva Hesse: Sculpture was on at the Whitechapel Gallery. Around the same time, Ryan discovered the work of Louise Bourgeois and Alice Aycock at the Hayward Gallery. Another formative influence was Barbara Hepworth.

== Exhibitions ==
=== Solo ===
Year	Title	Institution	Location	Ref
1984		Tom Allen Centre		
1987		ICA	London	
1987		Arnolfini Gallery	Bristol	
1988		Kettle's Yard	Cambridge	
1988		Riverside Studios	London	
1995		Camden Arts Centre	London	
1995		Angel Row	Nottingham	
2005	Archaeology of the Black Sun. Musings After Kristeva	Salena Gallery, Long Island University	New York	
2011 - 2012	The Weather Inside	The Mattress Factory	Pittsburgh	
2017 - 2018	The Art House	Wakefield		
2018	Virginia Woolf: Exhibition Inspired By Her Writings	Tate St Ives	Cornwall	
2018	Virginia Woolf: Exhibition Inspired By Her Writings	Tour		
2018	The Sculpture Collections Exhibition	Leeds Gallery Henry Moore Institute	Leeds	
2025	Unruly Objects	Pulitzer Arts Foundation	St Louis	
2026	Veronica Ryan: Multiple Conversations	Whitechapel Gallery	London	
2026		Mount Stuart	Isle of Bute	

=== Group ===
Year	Title	Institution	Location	Notes	Ref
1983	Five Black Women Artists	Africa Centre	London	Curated by Lubaina Himid	
1984	Sculptors and Modellers	Tate	London		
1985	The Thin Black Line	ICA	London	Curated by Lubaina Himid	
1986	Stoke City Garden Festival		Stoke-on-Trent		
1986	From Two Worlds	Whitechapel Gallery	London		
1986	From Two Worlds	Fruitmarket Gallery	Edinburgh		
1990	British Art Show	Hayward Gallery	London		
1993 - 1994	Recent British Sculpture	Touring		Organised by the Arts Council	
2015	Making It: Sculpture in Britain 1977–1986	Touring		Organised by the Arts Council	
2017	The Place Is Here	Nottingham Contemporary	Nottingham		

== Collections ==
Ryan's work is in several public collections including:

- Pérez Art Museum Miami
- Arts Council of Great Britain
- Tate
- The Henry Moore Collection
- Firstsite, Colchester
- Mellon Bank, Pittsburgh
- Rochdale Art Gallery
- Contemporary Arts Society
- Weltkunst Foundation, London
- Salsbury Collection
- Irvin Joffe Collection, London
- Cleveland County Museum
- The Boise Scholarship Collection
- Leeds Art Gallery

== Honours and recognition ==
Ryan has been awarded several prizes and honours, including:

- 1983: Second prize – Cleveland International Drawing Biennale
- 1987: Henry Moore Foundation Award
- 2018: Freelands Award, the Freelands Foundation
- 2019: Pollock Krasner Grant
- 2021: Appointed Officer of the Order of the British Empire (OBE) in the 2021 Birthday Honours for services to art.
- 2022: Winner – Turner Prize.

A portrait of Ryan by photographer Andy Feldman is in the collection of the National Portrait Gallery, London.
