= Joy Gregory =

British visual artist (born 1959)

- Born: 1959 (age 65–66); Bicester, England
- Education: Manchester Polytechnic; Royal College of Art
- Occupation: Visual artist
- Awards: Freelands Award (2023)
- Website: www.joygregory.co.uk

Joy Gregory (born 1959) is a British visual artist. Gregory's work explores concerns related to race, gender and cultural differences in contemporary society. Her work has been published and exhibited worldwide and is held in the collections of the Victoria and Albert Museum and Government Art Collection in the UK.

== Life and work ==
Gregory was born in Bicester, England, in 1959 to Jamaican parents. She grew up in Aylesbury, Buckinghamshire, and went on to study at Manchester Polytechnic and the Royal College of Art.

Gregory's techniques range from digital video installations to Victorian printing techniques.

In 2019, Gregory was awarded an Honorary Fellowship of the Royal Photographic Society.

The exhibition Lost languages and other voices in 2011 at Impressions Gallery in Bradford was the first major retrospective of her work spanning more than 20 years.

In 2023, Gregory and the Whitechapel Gallery won the Freelands Award. A retrospective exhibition of Gregory's career, entitled Catching Flies With Honey, opened at the gallery in October 2025.

== Exhibitions ==
- Polareyes: Black Women Photographers, Camden Arts Centre, London, 1987
- Autoportaits, Camerawork, London, 1990
- Ecstatic Antibodies: Resisting the AIDS Mythology, Ikon Gallery, Birmingham, 1990
- Who Do You Take Me For?, Institute of Modern Art, Brisbane, 1992
- 4th Istanbul Biennal, Istanbul, Turkey, 1995
- Blonde, Metro Cinema, London, 1998
- Lost Languages and other voices, Impressions Gallery, Bradford, 2011
- Catching Flies With Honey, Whitechapel Gallery, 8 October 2025 – 1 March 2026.

== Publications ==
- Joy Gregory. London: Autograph, Association of Black Photographers, 1994. ISBN 9781899282005.
- Objects of Beauty. London: Autograph, Association of Black Photographers, 2004. ISBN 9780954281342.

== Collections ==
Gregory's work is held in the following permanent collections:

- Victoria and Albert Museum, London
- Government Art Collection, UK

== Honours and recognition ==
- 2019: Honorary Fellowship of the Royal Photographic Society
- 2023: Freelands Award
