= Lubaina Himid =

British artist and curator (born 1954)

Professor Lubaina Himid CBE RA
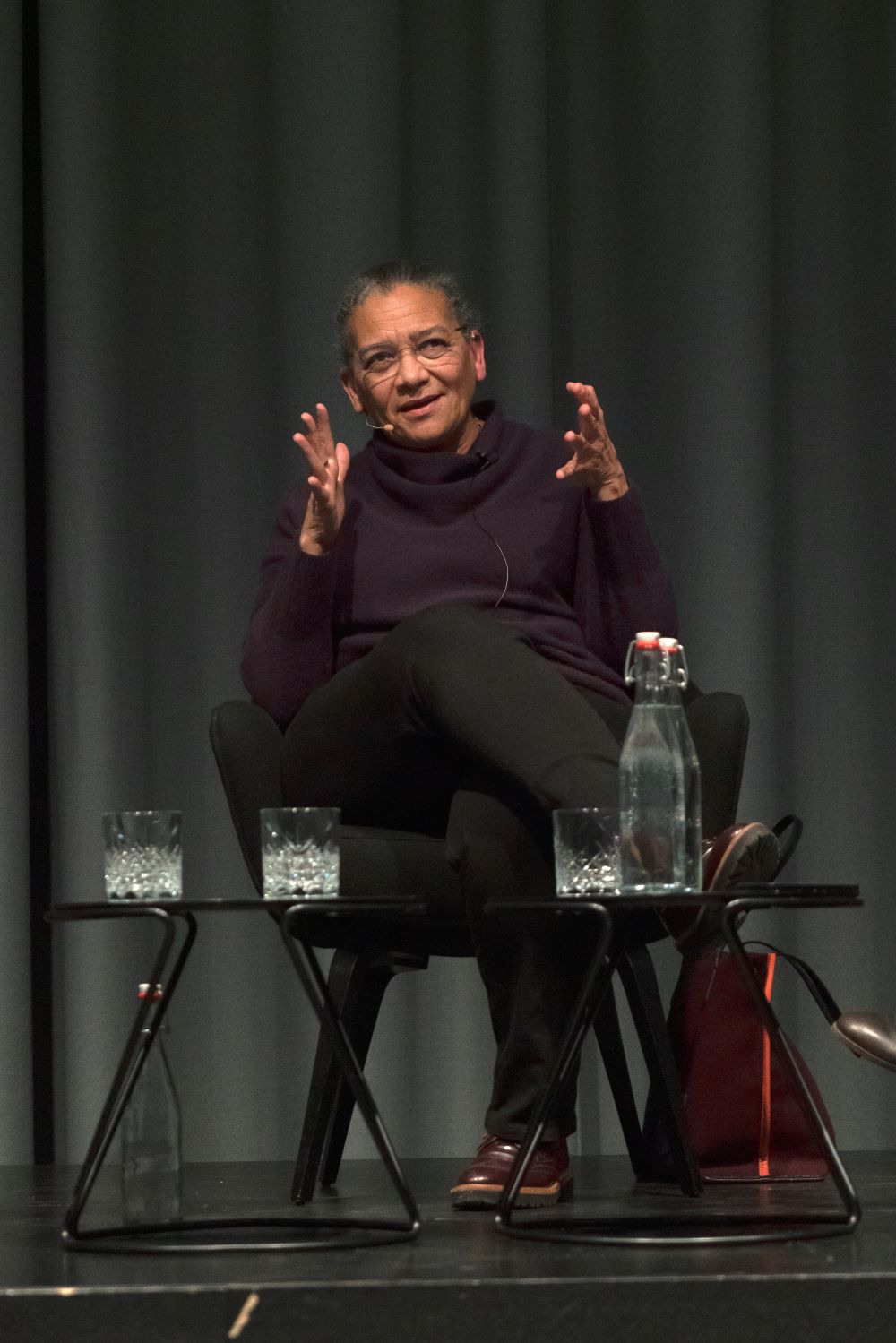
- Himid in 2022
- Born: 1954 (age 71–72); Sultanate of Zanzibar
- Education: Wimbledon College of Arts; Royal College of Art
- Occupations: Artist, professor, curator
- Years active: 1983–present
- Employer: University of Central Lancashire
- Awards: Turner Prize (2017); Maria Lassnig Prize (2023)

Lubaina Himid CBE RA (born 1954) is a British artist and curator. She is Professor of Contemporary Art at the University of Central Lancashire. Her art concentrates on themes of cultural history and the reclamation of identities.

Himid was among the first artists to take part in the Black Art movement in the United Kingdom during the 1980s, and she continues to produce activist art that is exhibited in galleries both in Britain and internationally. She was appointed MBE in June 2010 "for services to Black Women's Art", won the Turner Prize in 2017, and was advanced to CBE in the 2018 Queen's Birthday Honours "for services to Art".

In 2025, Himid was chosen by the British Council to represent the United Kingdom at the 2026 Venice Biennale.

== Early life and education ==
Himid was born in Zanzibar Sultanate (then a British protectorate, now part of Tanzania) in 1954 and moved to Britain with her mother, a textile designer, following the death of her father when she was four months old. She attended Wimbledon College of Arts, where she studied Theatre Design, obtaining her B.A. in 1976. She received her master's degree in Cultural History from the Royal College of Art in London in 1984.

== Curatorial work ==
In the early 80s, Himid organized three exhibitions in London of work by young Black and Asian women artists: Black Woman Time Now(1983) at the Battersea Arts Centre, Five Black Women (1983) at the Africa Centre, and The Thin Black Line (1985) at the Institute of Contemporary Arts. Together the exhibitions challenged the collective invisibility of these women in the British art world, engaging with contemporary social, cultural, political and aesthetic issues.

Other exhibitions Himid has curated include: Into the Open (1984), Unrecorded Truths (1986), Out There Fighting (1987), New Robes for MaShulan (1987), and State of the Art: Ideas and Images in the 1980s (1987). Into the Open, presented at Mappin Art Gallery in Sheffield, was widely regarded as the first major exhibit of the new generation of black British artists. Naming the Money (2004), presents an exuberant crowd of 100 enslaved people, portraying their roles they played in the princely courts of Europe: These roles span from dog-trainers, toy makers and mapmakers to dancing masters, musicians and painters. They were bought as the "property" of wealthy Europeans at a time when Africans were regarded as units of currency and black servants were status symbols. Encountering these victims of 18th-century human trafficking, the visitor learns their original identities, as well as those imposed on them.

== Critical reception ==
Himid considers that critical views changed after her work was shown by the Hollybush Gardens gallery in London 2013. Prior to this date she had exhibited in the UK but not internationally or in the largest UK institutions.

Reviewing an updated version of Himid's 2004 work Naming the Money for The Daily Telegraph in February 2017, Louisa Buck noted:

"Himid's work has long been concerned with black creativity, history and identity and this animated throng represents the Africans who were brought to Europe as slave servants. There are drummers, dog trainers, dancers, potters, cobblers, gardeners and players of the viola da gamba, all decked out in vivid versions of 17th century costume. Labels on their backs identify each individual, giving both their original African names and occupations as well those imposed by their new European owners, and these poignant texts also form part of an evocative soundtrack, interspersed with snatches of Cuban, Irish, Jewish and African music."

== Awards and honours ==
=== Board memberships ===
Himid has held positions on many boards and panels. She is on the board of trustees for the Lowry Arts Centre Manchester. Additionally, she is a board member for Arts Council England Visual Arts, Creative Partnerships East Lancs and Arts Council England North West. Previous board memberships include Matt's Gallery, London (2002–05), and Tate Liverpool Council (2000, 2005). From 1985 until 1987, Himid was on the Greater London Arts Association Visual Arts Panel.

=== Awards ===
Himid was appointed Member of the Order of the British Empire (MBE) in the June 2010 Birthday Honours "for services to Black Women's Art".

In 2017, Himid became the first black woman to win the Turner Prize. She was the oldest person to be nominated for the prize since the rules changed to allow the nomination of artists over the age of 50. There were, however, older nominees in the 1980s, before the age limit was introduced in 1994.

Apollo magazine named Himid as 2017 Artist of the Year.

Himid was promoted to Commander of the Order of the British Empire (CBE) in 2018 "for services to Art".

Himid was elected a Royal Academician in 2018.

In 2023, Himid was awarded the Maria Lassnig Prize.

== Notable works ==
- We Will Be (wood, paint, drawing pins, wool, collage, 1983)
- Bone in the China: success to the Africa Trade (installation, c. 1985)
- Revenge: a masque in five tableaux (multipart installation, 1991–92)
- Zanzibar (series of paintings, 1999)
- Plan B (series of paintings, 1999–2000)
- Swallow Hard: the Lancaster Dinner Service (painted ceramics, 2007)
- Negative Positives (series of graphic works, 2007– )
- Kangas (associated works on paper etc., various dates)
- Le Rodeur (series of paintings, 2016)
- Sometimes you don't know what you're getting until it's too late (series of paintings, 2020)
- Bittersweet (series of paintings, 2022)
- Bernier, Celeste-Marie; Rice, Alan; Himid, Lubaina; Durkin, Hannah (2019). Inside the invisible: memorialising slavery and freedom in the life and works of Lubaina Himid. Liverpool Studies in International Slavery: 14. Liverpool: Liverpool University Press. ISBN 978-1789620948.

=== Public collections ===
Himid's work is in many public collections, including Tate, Fitzwilliam Museum, Victoria & Albert Museum, Whitworth Art Gallery, Arts Council England, Manchester Art Gallery, International Slavery Museum, Liverpool, Walker Art Gallery, Birmingham City Art Gallery, Bolton Art Gallery, New Hall, Cambridge, the Harris Museum and Art Gallery, Preston and the British pavilion at the 2026 Venice Biennale.

== Solo exhibitions ==
- GA Fashionable Marriage, Pentonville Gallery, London (1986)
- ''The Ballad of the Wing'', Chisenhale Gallery, London (1989), and City Museum and Art Gallery, Stoke-on-Trent (1989)
- Lubaina Himid: Revenge, Rochdale Art Gallery, Rochdale (1992)
- Plan B and Zanzibar, Tate St. Ives (1999)
- Inside The Invisible, St. Jørgens Museum, Bergen, Norway (2001)
- Double Life, Bolton Museum (2001)
- Naming the Money, Hatton Gallery, Newcastle upon Tyne (2004)
- Swallow, Judges' Lodgings, Lancaster (2006)
- Swallow Hard, Judges' Lodgings, Lancaster (2007)
- Talking On Corners Speaking In Tongues, Harris Museum, Preston, Lancashire (2007)
- Kangas and Other Stories, Peg Alston Gallery, New York City (2008)
- Jelly Mould Pavilion, Sudley House, Liverpool and National Museums Liverpool (2010)
- Tailor Striker Singer Dandy, Platt Gallery of Costume, Manchester (2011)
- Invisible Strategies, Modern Art Oxford (2016–2017)
- Warp and Weft, Firstsite, Colchester (2017)
- Our Kisses are Petals, Baltic Centre for Contemporary Art, Gateshead (2018)
- Solo show at Tate Modern, London, November (2021–2022)

== See also ==
- Marina Abramović
- Bay Garnett
- Diana Chire
- Women in the art history field
