= Lighthouse (disambiguation) =

A lighthouse is a tower aiding marine navigation.

Light House, Lighthouse, or The Lighthouse may also refer to:

== Art and architecture ==
=== Buildings called "Light House" or "Lighthouse" ===
- Lighthouse (Aarhus), a skyscraper in Aarhus, Denmark
- Light House Cinema, Dublin 1988–present
- Light House Media Centre Wolverhampton, includes a cinema
- Light House Melbourne, residential skyscraper
- Lighthouse Cinema (disambiguation), multiple uses
- The Lighthouse (Glasgow), a museum of architecture and design in Glasgow, Scotland
- Lighthouse (Poole), an arts centre and cinema in Poole, Dorset, England
- The Lighthouse, Colombo, a large bungalow (mansion) in Colombo, Sri Lanka
- Light House (London), award-winning house in Notting Hill, London, England

== Film ==
- Lighthouse (1947 film), an American film directed by Frank Wisbar
- Light House (1976 film), an Indian Malayalam film
- Lighthouse (1999 film), a British horror film
- The Lighthouse (1998 film) (El faro), an Argentine and Spanish drama
- The Lighthouse (2016 film), based on the 1801 Smalls Lighthouse incident
- The Lighthouse (2019 film), an American-Canadian black and white fantasy horror film
- Mayak (film) (English title: The Lighthouse), a 2006 Russian film directed by Mariya Saakyan

== Literature ==
(Alphabetical by author's surname)

- The Lighthouse (James novel), 2005, by P. D. James
- The Lighthouse Trilogy, a set of young-adult novels by Adrian McKinty
- Light House: A Trifle (2000), a novel by William Monahan
- The Lighthouse (Moore novel), 2012, by Alison Moore
- Lighthouse (1975), a non-fiction book by Tony Parker
- "The Light-House", the unfinished final work of Edgar Allan Poe
- Lighthouse (novel), 1972, by Eugenia Price

== Music ==
=== Albums ===
- Light House (album), 1986, by Kim Carnes
- The Lighthouse (Amity Dry album), 2003
- The Lighthouse (Ana da Silva album), 2005
- The Lighthouse (Red Flag album), 1994
- Lighthouse (David Crosby album), 2016
- Lighthouse (iamthemorning album), 2016
- Lighthouse (Loudspeakers album), 2015
- Lighthouse (EP), 2023, by Gen Hoshino
- Lighthouse EP, an EP by The Waifs, or the title song
- Lighthouse (Duff McKagan album), 2023

=== Songs ===
- "The Lighthouse", by Interpol from Our Love to Admire, 2007
- "Lighthouse" (Westlife song), 2011
- "Lighthouse" (Lucy Spraggan song), 2013
- "Lighthouse" (G.R.L. song), 2015
- "Lighthouse" (Nina Kraljić song), 2016
- "Lighthouse" (Hearts & Colors song), 2016
- "Lighthouse" (Ookay and Fox Stevenson song), 2017
- "The Lighthouse" (Stevie Nicks song), 2024
- "Lighthouse", by Audio Adrenaline from Some Kind of Zombie, 1997
- "Lighthouse", by Charice from Infinity, 2011
- "Lighthouse", by Immanuel Wilkins from The 7th Hand, 2022
- "Lighthouse", by Kelly Clarkson from Chemistry, 2023
- "Lighthouse", by Gen Hoshino from the EP of the same name, 2023
- "The Lighthouse", by Halsey from If I Can't Have Love, I Want Power, 2021
- "Lighthouse", by Tresor featuring Sun-El Musician, Da Capo from Motion, 2021
- "The Lighthouse's Tale", by Nickel Creek

=== Other uses in music ===
- Lighthouse (band), a Canadian rock group
- The Lighthouse (opera), 1980, by Peter Maxwell Davies

== Television ==
- Lighthouse (talk show), a Japanese talk show, 2023
- Salty's Lighthouse, an American animated series for preschoolers, 1997–1998
- "Lighthouse" (Lost), a 2010 episode
- "Lighthouse" (Most Dangerous Game), a 2023 episode
- "The Lighthouse" (Haven), a 2013 episode
- "The Lighthouse" (How I Met Your Mother), a 2013 episode
- The Lighthouse, the apparent last refuge of humanity in season 5 episodes of Agents of S.H.I.E.L.D.

== Other arts, entertainment and games ==
- Lighthouse, a name used for the State Theatre Company of South Australia from 1982 to 1983
- The Lighthouse (Sapphire & Steel), a 2005 audio drama based on the British TV series Sapphire & Steel
- Lighthouse: The Dark Being, a 1996 computer game
- Lighthouse (dominoes), a double tile in dominoes with no matching tile in the same hand

== Businesses and organizations ==
=== Lighthouse organizations for the blind ===
- LightHouse for the Blind and Visually Impaired, San Francisco-based, the oldest of its kind
- Lighthouse Guild, NYC based
- Columbia Lighthouse for the Blind, regional, based in Washington DC
- Chicago Lighthouse, regional
- The Lighthouse of Houston, regional
- Lighthouse International, a New York City-based charitable organization for the visually impaired

=== Other businesses and organizations ===
- Light House Media Centre, a nonprofit art house cinema, gallery and media hub, Wolverhampton, England
- Lighthouse Café, a nightclub in Hermosa Beach, California, U.S.
- Lighthouse Design, a former software company (1989–1996), creator of the Lighthouse Application Suite
- Lighthouse Interactive, a Dutch video games publisher
- Lighthouse: Center for Human Trafficking Victims, Tokyo
- Lighthouse Wien, a shelter for homeless drug addicts in Vienna
- Lighthouse (British organisation), British coaching organisation that acts as a cult
- London Lighthouse, centre for people with HIV, merged in 2000 with the Terence Higgins Trust

== Technology and engineering ==
- Google Lighthouse, a tool for improving the quality of web pages
- Lighthouse, a type of tracking system used for virtual reality

== See also ==
- Light tower
- Category:Lighthouses
