= Lighthouse Cinema =

Lighthouse Cinema may refer to:

- Lighthouse Cinema (Kolkata), Kolkata, West Bengal, India
- Light House Cinema, Dublin, Ireland
- Light House Cinema (Dublin, 1988–1996)
- Light House Media Centre, Wolverhampton, West Midlands, England, includes a cinema
- The Lighthouse (Poole), Poole, Dorset, England, includes a cinema
- Lighthouse Cinema, defunct New York City venue
