= Claudette Holmes =

British photographer (born 1962)

Claudette May Holmes (born 1962) is a British photographer. Her work, which uses elements of montage and hand-colouring, has challenged stereotypical representations of Black British people.

== Life ==
Claudette Holmes was born in 1962 in Birmingham, England. In the early 1980s she worked in community arts in Birmingham. In 1982, she exhibited in Closing the Gap at the University of Aston and Herbert Art Gallery, Coventry.

In 1990, Holmes was among several female black and Asian photographers featured in the documentary Sistren in Photography. The 1993 exhibition From Negative Stereotype to Positive Image included her work alongside that of three other Birmingham photographers: Sir Benjamin Stone (1838–1914), Ernest Dyche (1887–1973) and Vanley Burke (born 1951). In 1996, she won the Chrissie Bailey Photography and Education Award.

== Exhibitions ==
- Womanness, Wolverhampton Art Gallery, 1990. With Roshini Kempadoo.
- Sharp Voices, Still Lives, Birmingham Museum and Art Gallery, 1990.
- In Sight in View: Mozaix Black Visual Arts Poster Campaign. Various sites, 1990. With Nigel Madhoo, Roshini Kempadoo, Alvin Kelly, Maxine Walker and Said Adrus.
- Manipulated Images, Picture House, Leicester, 1992.
- Black British Photographers, Houston FotoFestival, Texas, 1992.
- The Critical Decade, Museum of Modern Art, Oxford, 1993.
- From Negative Stereotype to Positive Image, Birmingham Central Library, 1993. With Sir Benjamin Stone, Ernest Dyche
