= Vanley Burke =

British Jamaican photographer and artist (born 1951)

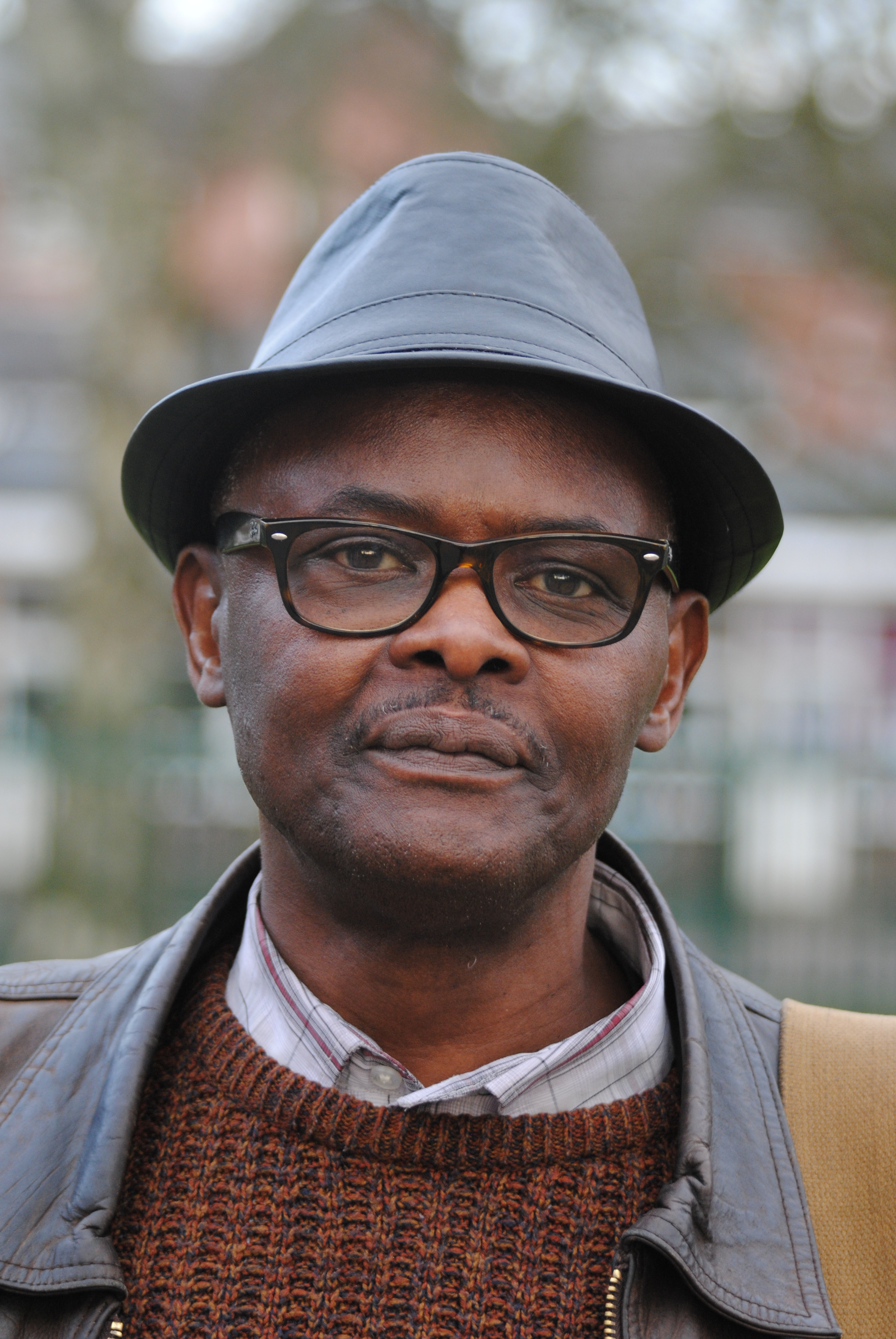
- Burke in February 2019
- Born: 1951 (age 74–75); Saint Thomas, Jamaica
- Occupations: Photographer; Artist
- Awards: Honorary Fellowship of the Royal Photographic Society; Paul Hamlyn Award
- Burke's voice recorded February 2019
- Website: www.vanley.co.uk

Vanley Burke (born 1951) is a British Jamaican photographer and artist. His photographs capture experiences of his community's arrival in Britain, the different landscapes and cultures he encountered, the different ways of survival and experiences of the wider African-Caribbean community.

== Life and work ==
Vanley Burke was born in St. Thomas, Jamaica, in 1951. For his 10th birthday, he was sent a "Box Brownie" camera—a Kodak Brownie 127—by his mother, who in the late 1950s had gone to live in England, while he remained with his aunt in St.Thomas. In 1965, at the age of 14, he went to join his parents in the UK, leaving his radio to his aunt as a parting gift but taking his camera with him.

Burke seriously started photography around 1967, making a conscious decision to document the black community and lifestyle in England. His first studio was in Grove Lane, Handsworth, Birmingham.

His photographs capture experiences of his community's arrival in Britain, the different landscapes and cultures he encountered, the different ways of survival and experiences of the wider African-Caribbean community. His photography sought to counteract any perception of negative or stereotypical imagery of black people found in mainstream media. His photographs represented members of the black community back to themselves in intimate portrayal and were taken from his perspective as an integral member of the community as opposed to basic documentary images perceived from "outsiders". Burke's interests have expanded to include other communities in the city and their experiences.

Burke's first notable exhibition, Handsworth from the Inside, was held at Ikon Gallery in Birmingham, and then the Commonwealth Institute in London in 1983. Since then his work has been exhibited at Light House, Birmingham Museum & Art Gallery, The Black Arts Gallery in London, Cornerhouse in Manchester and Walsall Museum and Art Gallery, and he has held solo exhibitions abroad in New York City and Mali. In addition to traditional galleries and other such settings, Burke has purposely exhibited his work in locations more easily accessible to black audiences such as community centres, clubs, pubs, churches, pool halls and schools. The 1993 exhibition From Negative Stereotype to Positive Image, organised by Birmingham Central Library, included his work alongside that of three other Birmingham photographers: Sir Benjamin Stone (1838–1914), Ernest Dyche (1887–1973) and Claudette Holmes (born 1962). Burke was a significant contributor of imagery to the Birmingham photography magazine and collective, Ten.8.

Burke's work has also been used in documentaries (including Handsworth Songs, 1986), television programmes, books and on record sleeves such as UB40's Geffery Morgan. A biography entitled A Retrospective, on the life and works of Burke, was published in 1993 by Lawrence & Wishart, edited by Mark Sealy. In 1990, Burke received a call from a friend in South Africa saying: "South Africa is going to be free and we need you here." During two visits to the country, in 1990 then in 1996, Burke photographed the life of black South Africans just after Nelson Mandela's release from prison and the subsequent ANC celebrations hosted and attended by Mandela for the anti-Apartheid veterans.

The "Vanley Burke Archive" maintained by Birmingham City Council is a constantly growing photographic and documentary community resource. Complementing his photographic documentation, Burke collects material that samples and evidences developments and activities of the black community in Britain. The material comprises things such as posters or flyers and funeral cards that may have been seen as disposable at the time of their creation but take greater significance when maintained in the context of his archive. They evidence and provide insight of the daily activities and everyday lives, cultural and religious beliefs, the arts, political ideals, health and other facets affecting the black community and others in Birmingham and in Britain. Burke is still documenting the black community in the UK and has more recently worked on a number of projects including an exhibition and publication project documenting the Asian community in Birmingham.

Having won a Kodak Award as early as 1984, he has also received an Honorary Doctorate from Leicester University, UK, in 2007, and the Wolverhampton School of Art and Design awarded him an Honorary Degree of Doctor of Art in 2009 at their award ceremony. Stuart Hall endorsed that:

"the personal, social and economic life of black people as they arrived, settled and became established in British society – is being constructed, given a certain meaning, significance, value, by Burke's camera eye, not merely 'captured'."

Burke said in September 2005:

"It's just about the ability to see something others may be unable to see, in terms of the value. Then show people. They need to see their contribution to this community. I mean, they have been contributing to this thing from the 50s and it's gone beyond, but there is no reference anywhere. It's about having themselves reflected, they are so desperate to see themselves. But this will be there, it isn't going anywhere....".

The British Library conducted an oral history interview (C459/217) with Burke in 2014 for its Oral History of British Photography collection.

In 2015, Burke recreated the front room of his home in Birmingham's Ikon Gallery, for a show characterised as "a living archive of untold black British history".

In 2018, the site-specific installation Vanley Burke: 5000 Miles and 70 Years was part of the events at mac, Birmingham, commemorating the 70th anniversary of the arrival of the HMT Empire Windrush from the Caribbean to the UK.

Burke was a guest on BBC Radio 4's programme Desert Island Discs, first broadcast on 4 November 2018, when he was interviewed by Lauren Laverne and explained his motivation for documenting culture and history.

In 2021, London's National Portrait Gallery acquired a portrait of Burke by photographer Pogus Caesar.

Burke was the recipient of a 2022 Paul Hamlyn Award for his contribution to Visual Art.

== Personal life ==
Burke is a father to three sons, a grandfather to six children.

== Exhibitions ==
=== Solo exhibitions ===
- Pan African Congress Rally, 1979, Manchester.
- Handsworth from inside, 1983, Commonwealth Institute, Black Art Gallery London.
- Connections, 1986, Open Eye Gallery, Liverpool.
- The World in Wolverhampton, 1986, Wolverhampton Museum and Art Gallery.
- Sundays are Bloody Awful, 1987, mac, Birmingham.
- Carnival in Exile, 1987, The Cave, Birmingham.
- Racism in Our Cities, 1991, Peterborough Arts Council.
- No Time for Flowers, Birmingham Museum and Art Gallery, 1991, Coventry Museum and Art Gallery.
- The Journey, Walsall Art Gallery, 1994, Watershed Bristol.
- Five Years = A Life Time, 1998, EMACA Nottingham, Nottingham Playhouse.
- Nkunzi – Photographs of Birmingham and South Africa, 1998, Soho House, Birmingham.
- Redemptions Songs, 2002, Symphony Hall, Birmingham.
- Living Through, 2004, Optima Housing Association, Birmingham.
- Moving Home, 2004, Light House Media Centre, Wolverhampton.
- INVISIBILE: Identity, Disability, Culture Somaliland, 2005, Birmingham Central Library, Birmingham.
- Schools, Colleges, Pubs and Church, 2006, Handsworth Park, Birmingham.
- By the Rivers of Birminam, 2012, mac, Birmingham.
- Handsworth Culture Swap with Burke, 2013, Soho House, Birmingham
- At Home With Vanley Burke, 2015, Ikon Gallery, Birmingham
- Home, 2020, Birmingham Hippodrome.
- Blood & Fire: Our Journey Through Vanley Burke's History, 2022, Soho House Museum, Birmingham.
- A Gift to Birmingham, 2022, Ikon Gallery, Birmingham (23 March 2022 – 3 April 2022). Handsworth Library (16 December 2022 – 31 March 2023).

=== Group exhibitions ===
- From Negative Stereotype to Positive Image, Birmingham Central Library, 1993
- The Meaning of Style: Black British Style, and the underlying political and social environment (New Art Exchange, 16 January–10 April 2010)
- Get Up, Stand Up Now, Somerset House, London, 2019
- Don't Blame the Blacks, Nottingham Castle, 2021
- Life Between Islands: Caribbean-British Art 1950s–Now, Tate Britain, London, 2021/22)
- Rebellion to Romance, Leeds Central Library, 2022

== Publications ==
=== Books by Burke ===
- Sealy, M., and S. Hall (1993), Vanley Burke A Retrospective. London: Lawrence & Wishart. ISBN 0853157839.
- Vanley Burke: by the Rivers of Birminam (with Eddie Chambers. Birmingham: mac, Birmingham, 2012. Edited by Lynda Morris. ISBN 978-1907796135. With essays by Morris and Chambers. Published to accompany a retrospective exhibition at mac, Midlands Arts Centre), Birmingham, 22 September–18 November 2012.
- Burke, V., and P. James (2015), At Home With Vanley Burke. Birmingham: Ikon. ISBN 9781904864981.

=== Books with contributions by Burke ===
- Archer-Straw, Petrine, David A. Bailey and R. Powell (2005), Back to Black: Art, Cinema & the Racial Imaginary. London: Whitechapel Art Gallery. ISBN 0854881425
- Burke, V., F. Bulbulia and F. Isiakpere (1997), Council of the Elders, A Tribute to the Veterans of South Africa. South Africa: Minaj. ISBN 9783366572
- Campany, D., L. Morris, M. Nash and T. Barson (2007), Making History: Art and Documentary in Britain from 1929 to Now. London: Tate. ISBN 1854376829
- Eshun, K., and A. Sagar (2007), The Ghost of Songs – The Art of Black Audio Film Collective. Chicago: University of Chicago Press. ISBN 1846310148
- Faulkner, S., and A. Ramamurthy (2006), Visual Culture And Decolonisation in Britain (British Art and Visual Culture Since 1750 New Readings). London: Ashgate Pub Co. ISBN 0754640027
- Grosvenor, I., R. McLean and S. Roberts (2002), Making Connections: Birmingham Black International History. Birmingham: BPBFG. ISBN 0954371305
- Grunenberg, C., and R. Knifton (2007), Centre of the Creative Universe: Liverpool and the Avant-garde. Liverpool: Liverpool University Press. ISBN 1846310814
- James, P., and C. Upton (2003), A World City – Birmingham. Birmingham: Birmingham City Council Department of Leisure & Co. ISBN 0709302436
- Mellor, D. (2007), No Such Thing as Society: Photography in Britain 1967–1987. Hayward. ISBN 1853322652
- Onnen, S. (2007), Flava: Wedge Curatorial Projects 1997–2007. Canada: WCP. ISBN 097833700X
- Sirmans, M. F., and J. Beauchamp-Byrd (1997), Transforming the Crown: African, Asian, and Caribbean Artists in Britain 1966–1996. Chicago: University of Chicago Press.
- Tulloch, C. (2004), Black Style. London: Victoria & Albert Museum. ISBN 1851774246
- Williams, V., and S. Bright (2007), How We Are: Photographing Britain. London: Tate. ISBN 1854377140

== Awards ==
- 2021: Honorary Fellowship of the Royal Photographic Society, Bristol
- 2022: Paul Hamlyn Award
- 2025: Honorary doctorate by Birmingham City University
