= CLB =

CLB may refer to:

== Organizations ==
- Canadian Language Benchmarks, the Canadian system of measuring English as a Second Language (ESL) proficiency levels.
- China Labour Bulletin, a non-governmental organization that promotes and defends workers’ rights in the People's Republic of China
- Church Lads' Brigade, from 1891 to 1978, a predecessor of the Church Lads' and Church Girls' Brigade, a Church of England youth organisation
- Columbia Lighthouse for the Blind, an organization founded to help the blind or visually impaired population of the greater Washington, D.C. region

== Other uses ==
- Certified Lover Boy, a 2021 album by Canadian rapper Drake
- Combat logistics battalion, a unit in the United States Marine Corps
- Configurable logic block, a component of a field-programmable gate array
