= Naïve Art (album) =

Studio album by Red Flag
- Released: 1989
- Genre: Synth-pop
- Length: 1:19:29
- Label: Enigma Records
- Producer: Paul Robb

Red Flag chronology
Naïve Art (1989)	Naive Dance (2008)

Professional ratings
Review scores
Source	Rating
AllMusic	2.5/5 stars

Naïve Art is the debut album by British-American synthpop band Red Flag, released in 1989.

== Track listing ==
1. "If I Ever" (4:45)
2. "Pretty in Pity" (4:15)
3. "Russian Radio" (6:12)
4. "Give Me Your Hand" (5:03)
5. "All Roads Lead to You" (6:51)
6. "Count to Three" (4:06)
7. "Save Me Tonight" (5:04)
8. "Broken Heart" (4:04)
9. "I Don't Know Why" (5:55)
10. "Rain" (6:09)
11. "Für Michelle" (2:25)
12. "If I Ever" (Extended Remix) (6:33)*
13. "Russian Radio" (Razormaid Dub) (6:48)*
14. "Broken Heart" (Tra Graham Dub) (6:07)*
15. "Rain" (Remix) (5:12)*

Recorded at Platinum Island Studios, NYC.

=== Notes ===
- - The artwork incorrectly lists track 12 as "Russian Radio (Razormaid Dub)" and track 13 as "If I Ever (Extended Remix)". Tracks 14 and 15 are not listed as in other versions of this release.

== Special edition ==
Naïve Art – Special Edition

Studio album by Red Flag
- Released: 2001
- Recorded: Platinum Islands Studios, N.Y.C.; Studio 245 San Francisco CA; DerGalf Studios (2001)
- Genres: Synth-pop, electronic
- Length: 1:13:57
- Label: Restless
- Producer: Chuck Kelley

Red Flag chronology
The Crypt (2000)	Naïve Art – Special Edition (2001)	Fear of a Red Planet (2001)

Naïve Art – Special Edition is a special release of the album Naïve Art, which included new tracks and remixes.

=== Track listing ===
1. "If I Ever" (4:45)
2. "Pretty in Pity" (4:14)
3. "Russian Radio" (6:11)
4. "Give Me Your Hand" (5:02)
5. "All Roads Lead to You" (6:50)
6. "Count to Three" (4:05)
7. "Save Me Tonight" (5:03)
8. "Broken Heart" (4:02)
9. "I Don't Know Why" (5:51)
10. "Rain" (6:08)
11. "Für Michelle" (2:23)
12. "Russian Radio (Razormaid Dub)" (5:23)
13. "If I Ever (Extended Remix)" (5:05)
14. "Black Rose" (3:49)
15. "Lovers Unite" (4:49)
16. "Russian Radio (Seibold Mix)" (5:16)
17. "Russian Radio (Decade Mix)" (4:55)

=== Notes ===
- - Indicated tracks appear on CD only (1989 Enigma Records, CD/vinyl/cassette). Re-released on Restless Records (1994). The CD and vinyl versions contain different mixes of some songs.

== 30th Anniversary Expanded Edition ==
Naïve Art – 30th Anniversary Expanded Edition

Studio album by Red Flag
- Released: April 30, 2020
- Recorded: Pylon Records
- Genres: Synth-pop, electronic
- Length: 1:19:36
- Label: Pylon
- Producer: Paul Robb

Red Flag chronology
Endless (2019)	Naïve Art – 30th Anniversary Expanded Edition (2020)

Naïve Art – 30th Anniversary Edition is a special release of the album Naïve Art, which included remastered tracks and remixes. A vinyl version was released on March 9, 2020. Some tracks appear on CD for the first time.

=== Track listing ===
==== Disc 1 ====
1. "If I Ever" (4:45)
2. Pretty In Pity (4:15)
3. Russian Radio (6:13)
4. Give Me Your Hand (5:03)
5. All Roads Lead To You (6:52)
6. Count To Three (4:06)
7. Save Me Tonight (5:04)
8. Broken Heart (4:04)
9. I Don't Know Why (5:56)
10. Rain (6:10)
11. Für Michelle (2:26)
12. Broken Heart (Radio Edit) (3:57)
13. Control (5:31)
14. Black Rose (3:49)
15. Lovers Unite (4:51)
16. Rain (Remix) (5:12)

==== Disc 2 ====
1. Russian Radio (Glasnost Club Mix) (7:30)
2. Broken Heart (UK Remix) (5:19)
3. If I Ever (Dance Mix) (6:32)
4. Count To Three (Razormaid Remix) (6:51)
5. Give Me Your Hand (Razormaid Remix) (6:55)
6. Broken Heart (Extended Remix) (5:40)
7. Russian Radio (Razormaid Dub) (6:47)
8. Count To Three (House Mix) (7:31)
9. If I Ever (The 1000 Years Mix) (6:40)
10. Russian Radio (Tremont & Webster Mix) (4:41)
11. Pretty In Pity (Painless Mix) (4:35)
12. Broken Heart (Remix) (6:03)
13. Russian Radio (Radio Moscow Edit) (3:45)

=== Notes ===
- - Indicated tracks appear on CD only. Also released on vinyl in standard black and red or white translucent.
