= Portlight =

Portlight may refer to:

- Another name for a lighthouse
- The heavy glass cover for a porthole
- Portlight Strategies, an American charity helping hurricane victims

== See also ==
- Lighthouse (disambiguation)
