= If I Ever =

If I Ever may refer to:

- If I Ever (Red Flag song), 1989
- If I Ever (Otha Young song), recorded by Juice Newton & Silver Spur, and by Randy Gurley
- If I Ever, a song by Tanita Tikaram from the album The Cappuccino Songs
