= Break In The Seal =

1986 Photographic exhibition

Break In The Seal: The Photographs of Pogus Caesar and Vanley Burke was a photographic exhibition held 23 August – 21 September 1986 at the Herbert Art Gallery & Museum, Jordan Well, Coventry, by two United Kingdom artists: Pogus Caesar, born in St Kitts, and Vanley Burke from Jamaica. Both came to the United Kingdom from the West Indies as children and have spent most of their lives in Birmingham, where they were educated and still work.

Burke's work concentrates on documenting the everyday life of the community around him. While Caesar is a Pointillist artist, it was his recent interest in photography that forged their individual talents into a partnership resulting in the production of this exhibition.

The photographs exhibited in Break In The Seal provide alternative views of two cities, New York City, United States, and Birmingham, England. The images of New York were taken by Caesar in the tough areas of Bronx, Brooklyn, Harlem and Queens, and Burke's photographs are of Handsworth, an inner-city area of Birmingham.
