= Zhovtyak =

Zhovtyak (Ukrainian: Жовтяк, pronounced [ʒou̯ˈtʲɑk]) is a Ukrainian surname. Notable people with the name include:

- Volodymyr Zhovtyak (born 1973), Ukrainian social activist, human rights defender
- Yevhen Zhovtyak (born 1961), Ukrainian politician
