= Volodymyr Zhovtyak =

- Володимир Жовтяк
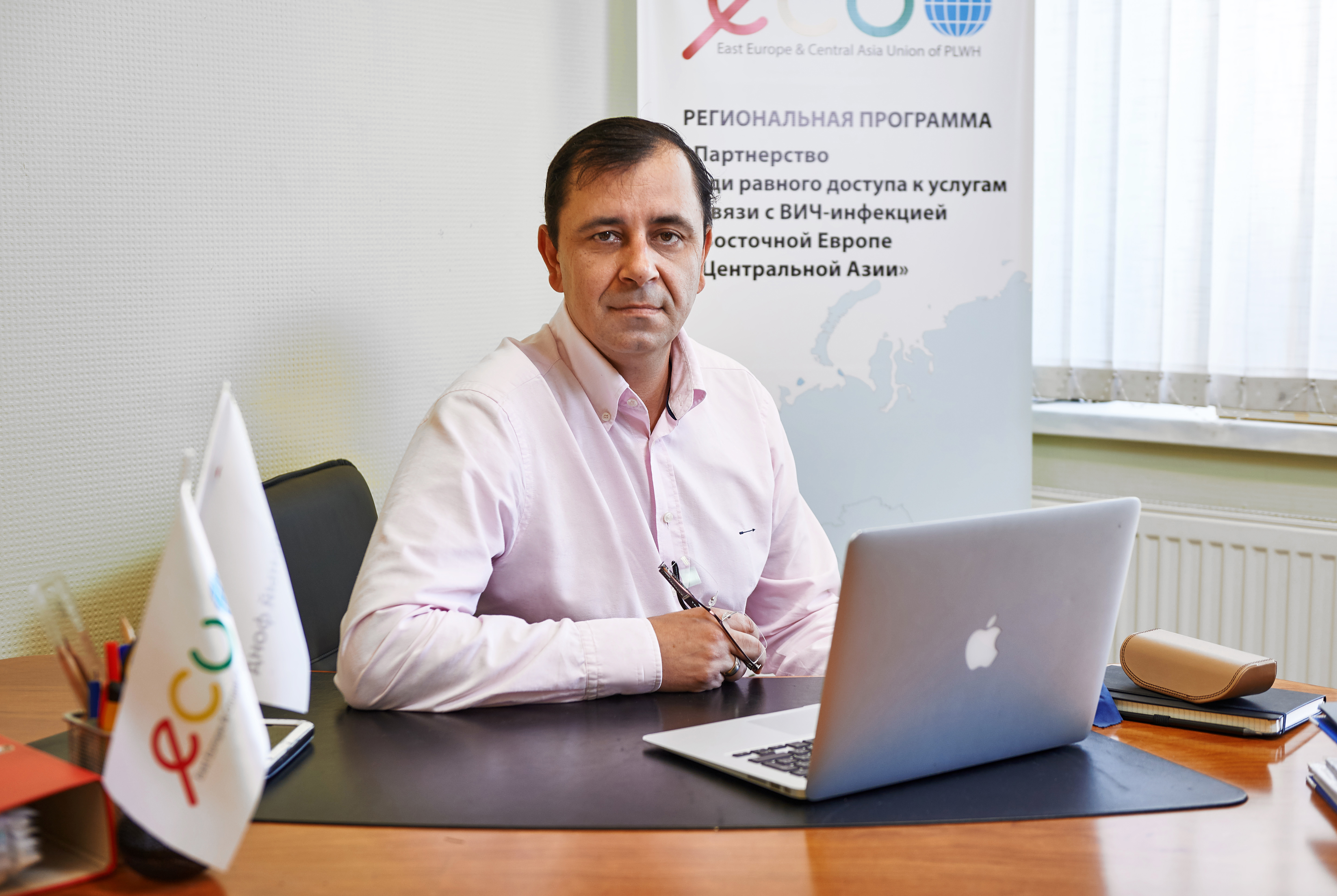
- Born: 3 June 1973 (age 53); Poltava, Ukraine
- Education: Kyiv National University of Culture and Arts
- Occupations: social activist; human rights defender
- Known for: Head of the Coordination Council: All-Ukrainian Network of PLWH 2001-2016; President: Eastern Europe and Central Asia Union of PLWH 2006 - present; Editor: Platform MinusVirus 2016 - present
- Website: ecuo.org

Volodymyr Zhovtyak (Ukrainian: Володимир Жовтяк, pronounced [woloˈdɪmɪr ʒou̯ˈtʲɑk]; (Note: Russian: Владимир Жовтяк, pronounced [vlɐˈdʲimʲɪr ʐɐfˈtʲak].) born 3 June 1973) is a Ukrainian social activist and a human rights defender. He is one of the leaders of the movement of people living with HIV/AIDS (further PLWH) in Ukraine, and in the region of Eastern Europe and Central Asia. He is one of the founders of the national and international non-governmental organizations of PLWH, which collaborates with institutions of the United Nations, the European Union and the USA, as well as with the Cabinet of Ministers and the Presidential Administration of Ukraine.

== Biography ==
Volodymyr Zhovtyak was born in Poltava, Ukraine on 3 June 1973. He graduated from school No. 6 of Poltava (1990). He is a graduate of Kyiv National University of Culture and Arts (2005, management and economics faculty). He is the head of the Coordination Council of the charitable organization All-Ukrainian Network of PLWH (since 2001); the president of the international charitable organization Eastern Europe and Central Asia Union of PLWH (since 2005, the union has included organizations from 16 countries). The place of his residence is the city of Kyiv.

Volodymyr Zhovtyak is a member of advisory and consultative bodies under the President of Ukraine — the National Health Council (2006–2010); the Coordinating Council on HIV/AIDS, Tuberculosis and Drug Addiction (2008–2010). He is a member of advisory and consultative bodies of the Cabinet of Ministers of Ukraine — the National Coordinating Council on HIV/AIDS (2005–2006, the chairman of the Committee on the Protection of the Rights of PLWH), the National Council to Fight Tuberculosis and HIV/AIDS (its deputy chairman since 2007).

In the late 1990s, when he personally faced the problem of HIV, he became one of seven activists, having first founded an initiative group and then the All-Ukrainian Network of PLWH. As a HIV-problem insider, he realized that HIV-positive people in Ukraine had no access to treatment, care and support. That's why he began actively developing the civilian sector in Ukraine — he unified activists to defend his own legal rights, lobby for access to treatment, improve life quality of people living with HIV/AIDS in Ukraine.

In 1999, a group of people with HIV/AIDS initiated changes in the country. Being supported by the UN Development Programme and the Counterpart Alliance for Partnership (a project by the U.S. Agency for International Development), the initiative group under the chairmanship of Volodymyr Zhovtyak started its work. Since the official registration of the charitable organization All-Ukrainian Network of PLWH (in 2001), he has been elected the head of the Coordination Council of the organization. Since its foundation, the Network has been the main organization, acting on behalf of PLWH community in Ukraine.

Volodymyr Zhovtyak was repeatedly invited to speak at the Verkhovna Rada of Ukraine during public hearings on HIV/AIDS epidemic control. He is a member of the editorial board Lyudi i Vich (People and HIV, Russian: Люди и ВИЧ), having 5 reeditions; the author of articles in thematic periodicals and numerous mass media interviews.

== Social activity ==
Volodymyr Zhovtyak is a member of special sessions of the United Nations General Assembly (2001, 2006, 2008, 2011, 2012). He was a delegate from Ukraine at the first Special Session of the UN General Assembly on HIV/AIDS (New York, 2001). His joining the delegation as a representative of PLWH community of the country took place a month after the official registration of the All-Ukrainian Network of PLWH. The second Special Session of the UN General Assembly on HIV/AIDS (2011), in which he participated, adopted the Political Declaration on HIV and AIDS.

The collaboration of the All-Ukrainian Network of PLWH under the chairmanship of V. Zhovtyak with Elton John AIDS Foundation began from the moment of the Network's official registration in 2001. The foundation offered financial aid to the Network's services programs for HIV.

V. Zhovtyak is actively engaged in discussions on social policy, respect for human rights and discrimination against HIV-positive people in Ukraine. In 2002, the All-Ukrainian Network of PLWH launched a vast campaign to cut antiretroviral drugs (ARD) prices. In May 2002, Volodymyr Zhovtyak, with the support of UNAIDS, participated in negotiations between the country's government, several institutions of the UN and transnational pharmaceutical companies. Due to the consolidated attitude of the Network's activists, the pharmaceutical companies had to reduce prices by 75% with time.

Since 2003, Volodymyr Zhovtyak has participated in Board meetings of the Global Fund to Fight AIDS, Tuberculosis and Malaria. He was the first representative of the civil society in the delegation of Eastern Europe and Central Asia at the Fund board. He suggested changing the regulation on participating in the work of delegations. Due to this initiative, each of 24 countries of the region could have 2 of its representatives in the delegation — one on behalf of the government, the other — on behalf of the civil society. Therefore, the civil society could participate in the work of the delegation. He was personally involved in getting to Ukraine over a half-billion dollars of gratuitous financial aid, offered since 2003 by the Global Fund to combat the epidemic of AIDS and tuberculosis (for buying drugs, preventive measures, care and support).

As the president of the international charitable organization Eastern Europe and Central Asia Union of PLWH (since the moment of its foundation in 2005), Volodymyr Zhovtyak has contributed to advocacy of access to ARD therapy in Eastern Europe and Central Asia, consulted representatives of PLWH community of the region on establishing and managing organizations of PLWH, represented their interests in international institutions. In the context of the Lithuanian presidency of the EU Council, with the support of the Ministry of Foreign Affairs of Lithuania, the association Positive Life, in collaboration with Eastern Europe and Central Asia Union of PLWH held an international forum "HIV in Europe and neighboring countries" (Klaipėda, Lithuania, 2013). At the suggestion of V. Zhovtyak, the forum adopted an appeal to European governments, adjacent states and the Global Fund Board, signed by PLWH organizations of 17 countries of the region.

On 21 November 2005, a presentation of the joint UNAIDS/WHO report, AIDS Epidemic Update 2005, for the first time took place in Ukraine. The UN Secretary-General's special envoy professor Lars Kallings, and the head of the UN Theme Group on HIV/AIDS in Russia, representative of the UN Office on Drugs and Crime Flavio Mirella came to Kyiv. The UN envoy Lars Kallings was received by the President of Ukraine Viktor Yushchenko, L. Kallings was accompanied by UNAIDS country coordinator Ani Shakarishvili, Ukraine's health minister Yuri Polyachenko and the head of the Coordination Council of the All-Ukrainian Network of PLWH Volodymyr Zhovtyak. In the follow-up discussion, the President reported on Ukraine's getting international support for AIDS prevention as well as on his personal control of the problem.

In 2006, Volodymyr Zhovtyak, as a representative of Ukraine, participated in negotiations with the Clinton Foundation HIV/AIDS Initiative. The project comprised representatives of German Agency for International Cooperation (a project of the Federal Government of Germany), Policy (a project of the European Union), the U.S. Agency for International Development. The Clinton Foundation through its acquisition fund provided to Ukraine access to low prices on diagnostic equipment and ARD-drugs for HIV-infected people. There was signed an agreement on Ukraine's access to wider practical use of ARD therapy. When signing the agreement, the Fund manager and former President of the USA Bill Clinton said that it would help to increase the number of people, who receive medical treatment.

In 2010, as a member of the public, V. Zhovtyak opened the XVIII International AIDS Conference (AIDS 2010) in Vienna (Austria). The conference delegates were greeted also by the Austrian President Heinz Fischer, federal minister of health Alois Stöger, the Deputy President of the Republic of South Africa Kgalema Motlanthe and EU Commissioner of Health and Consumer Policy John Dalli. The international conference aimed at resolving global problems of HIV/AIDS, was held with the support of UNAIDS and the Global Fund.

V. Zhovtyak participated in the 61st session of the World Health Organization Regional Committee for Europe (September 2011, Baku, Azerbaijan, a member of the national delegation of Ukraine). In the person of Volodymyr Zhovtyak, representatives of the civil society for the first time took part in a session of the WHO Regional Committee for Europe. The session adopted European Action Plan for HIV/AIDS 2012–2015 involving member states, civil society, donor and development agencies, non-governmental organizations and the European Commission.

Since July 2014 (when Ukraine was elected to the Board), Volodymyr Zhovtyak had been a member of the UNAIDS Programme Coordinating Board. The first Ukrainian delegation was headed by the Deputy Prime Minister of Ukraine Oleksandr Sych. In December 2014, V. Zhovtyak participated in the 35th session of the Board that was opened in Geneva (Switzerland). The session dealt with creating an international policy to confront HIV/AIDS after 2015.

== Literature ==
1. Жовтяк, В. Большой "праздник" вокруг проблем ВИЧ/СПИД // Новости ВИЧ/СПИД. 2002. Вып. 3 (6). С. 14. (in Russian)
2. NGO Zhapagat, working for the support of PLWHA in Temirtau, Karaganda Oblast, Kazakhstan // Into Focus. Almaty (Kazakhstan), 2003. No. 8. P. 4.
3. Люди и ВИЧ. Книга для неравнодушных / ред. совет: Андрущак Л., Балакирева О., Жовтяк В. и др. Изд. 3. К. : [МБФ "Междунар. альянс по ВИЧ/СПИД в Украине"], 2004. 527 с. ISBN 966-96099-5-X; Изд. 4. 2006. 633 с. ISBN 966-8978-29-3; 5-е изд. 2009. 704 с. ISBN 978-966-8035-65-4. (in Russian)
4. Goei, Tanne de. AIDS ist nicht nur eine Epidemie : Volodymyr Zhovtyak // Blickpunkt AIDS / Deutsche AIDS-Hilfe e.V. [Berlin] : Herausgeber Corinna Gekeler; Dirk Hetzel, 2005. P. 19. ISBN 3-930425-56-4. (in German)
5. Возвращение к жизни. Заместительная терапия глазами специалистов и бывших потребителей инъекционных наркотиков. К. : Программа развития ООН в Украине, 2007. С. 12. (in Russian)
6. Zhovtyak, Vladimir. Social exclusion of people living with HIV in Eastern Europe and the CIS // Beyond transition towards inclusive societies. [Regional human development report] / published by United Nations Development Programme, Regional Bureau for Europe and CIS. Bratislava (Slovakia) : [Valeur], 2011. P. 65. ISBN 978-92-95092-31-0.
7. Zhovtyak, Volodymyr. Acknowledgements // The people living with HIV Stigma Index : analytical report based on research findings. Kyiv : [Engineering], 2011. P. 6. ISBN 978-966-2344-12-7.
8. Зустріч високого рівня з питань ВІЛ/СНІДу: ключові результати для регіону // Інформаційний вісник Всеукраїнської мережі ЛЖВ. 2011. № 3 (60). С. 1–3. (in Ukrainian)
9. The State Penitentiary Service opened doors for civil society organizations of Ukraine // Human Rights In Healthcare — 2012. Human rights NGOs report on respect for the right to health in Ukraine / The Legal Research and Strategy Institute. Kharkiv (Ukraine): Prava ludyny, 2013. P. 42.
