= Flip Animation Festival =

Former festival held in Wolverhampton

FLIP was an animation festival that took place between 2004 and 2012, primarily hosted by the Light House Media Centre in Wolverhampton, UK. FLIP took place annually at the beginning of November and attracted submissions from more than 30 countries worldwide. As well as screening selected submissions, FLIP held talks from professionals from the animation world, workshops, industry panels and competitions. Between 2004 and 2011 the festival was set up and managed by Peter McLuskie. It grew out of the 'Animation Forum', also based at Light House, later rebranded as Animation Forum West Midlands, which found a home at Birmingham City University. In 2009, the festival was awarded a Black Country Tourism Award for Event of the Year.

== The festival ==
Based in Wolverhampton, the festival began in 2004 and featured film screenings and retrospectives of short films as well as a range of events including educational workshops, experimental animation, industry led panels and spotlights on animation studios. FLIP was organised and hosted by Light House Media Centre in partnership with the University of Wolverhampton's School of Art and Design and School of Computing & IT, Wolverhampton Art Gallery. It was part funded by UK Film Council (National Lottery) through Screen West Midlands; Wolverhampton City Council; University of Wolverhampton; Business Link West Midlands and Animation Forum West Midlands.

=== Exhibitions ===
FLIP had a partnership with Wolverhampton Art Gallery who showed works as part of the Festival. FLIP 2007 saw an exhibition of original puppets used in films such as The Corpse Bride, Mars Attacks! and Andy Pandy. During FLIP 2008, the Light House building was home to large, moving, kinetic sculptures, by London-based artist Steve Hutton. There was also a screening of animated Doctor Who episodes from the 1960s, followed by a talk on Doctor Who animation. 2009 saw the Glasgow-based Axis Animation and ArthurCox studios present examples of their work. 2010's festival hosted a presentation from the creators of the LittleBigPlanet games, Media Molecule, as well as a display from Light House Media Centre's own animator in residence, Drew Roper, including his set for his award-winning film 'A History of Denim'.

In 2011, FLIP's exhibitions included works by Barry JC Purves which included a display of the Tchaikovsky puppet, the Birmingham leg of GLI.TC/H festivals' submissions, as well as sketchbooks and artworks by Tori Davis and work from the 2011 feature film Rio, and maquettes from UK puppet makers Mackinnon & Saunders. Events at 2012's FLIP included a collaborative project between web developers, animators and artists, an exhibition of artwork in vacant shops across the city and a model making workshop by Aardman Animations. The festival also helped schools develop a forum for animation shown during the festival.

A recurring feature of FLIP was a curated programme hosted by guests from the animation world, including Professor Paul Wells (Director of Animation, Loughborough University), The Brothers McLeod and Clare Kitson, a former programmer at the National Film Theatre and who commissioned Channel 4's animation from 1989 to 1999.

=== The awards ===
The festival included a competition between animated films created using various techniques (stop motion, animated drawings, cut out paper, modelling clay, etc.) classified in to various award categories. These have included the following:

- Best of Festival
- Best UK Film
- Best International Film
- Best Newcomer
- Best Experimental Film

FLIP also ran competitions for student films, created by current university/college students and, from 2010, for animators under the age of 18 years as well.

== FLIP Festival 2011 ==
FLIP Festival 2011 took place on 27–29 October 2011.

The Audience Choice winners of 2011's festival were:

- Bertie Crisp, Dir. Francesca Adams (UK)
- The Skeleton Woman, Dir. Sarah Van Den Boom (France)
- Dead Bird, Dir. Trevor Hardy (UK)
- Robin Hood, Dir, Ben Smith (UK)
- Caged, Dir. Ravi Maheru (UK)
- John and Betty, Dir. Alex Hancocks & Luke George (UK)

== FLIP Festival 2010 ==
FLIP Festival 2010 took place on 4–6 November 2010.

The award winners of 2010's festival were:

- Best of Festival: Simon Cartwright & Jessica Cope with The Astronomer's Sun
- Best International Film: Blu with Big Bang, Big Boom
- Best Documentary: Samantha Moore with An Eyeful of Sound
- Best Experimental Film: Will Anderson with Another Day
- Best Sound: Elli Vuorinen with Tongueling
- Best New Talent: Julia Gromskaya with L’Anima Mavi
- Best Student Film: India Swift with Squid in Love
- Student Runners up: Matthew Duddington with By its Clover; Ben Smallman with Tales of Beardyman

== FLIP Festival 2009 ==
2009's FLIP Festival took place on 5–7 November.

The award winners for 2009's Festival were:

- Best of Festival: Taku Kimura with Kudan.
- Best UK Film: Steve Irwin with Black Dogs Progress.
- Best International Film: Jake Armstrong with The Terrible Thing of Alpha 9, USA.
- Best Newcomer: Kristian Andrews with Rabbit Punch
- Best Experimental Film: Virginia Mori with Il Gioco de Silenzio (The Play of Silence).
- Best Stop Motion: Bang Yao Lui with Deadline
- Special Jury Mention: Ed Barrett with Man Up

== FLIP Festival 2008 ==
2008's FLIP Festival took place on 6–8 November.

The award winners for 2008's Festival were:

- Best Film: Blu with Muto.
- Best UK Film: Luis Cook with The Pearce Sisters.
- Best International Film: Jeremy Clapin with Skhizein.
- Best Abstract Film: Blu with Muto.
- Best Sound Design: Alexei Alexeev with KJFG No5.
- Best Newcomer: Tom Senior with One Nice Family Photo
- Best Student Film: Reza Dolatabadi with Khoda

== FLIP Festival 2007 ==
2007's FLIP Festival took place on 1–3 November.

The award winners for 2007's Festival were:

- Best Film: Lizzy Hobbs with The Old, Old, Very Old Man.
- Best Student Film: Paul O’Flanagan with Beauty Now.
- Special Mention (Student Film): Julian Kok with Mimos and the Egg.
