= Lighthouse Wien =

Austrian non-profit organization

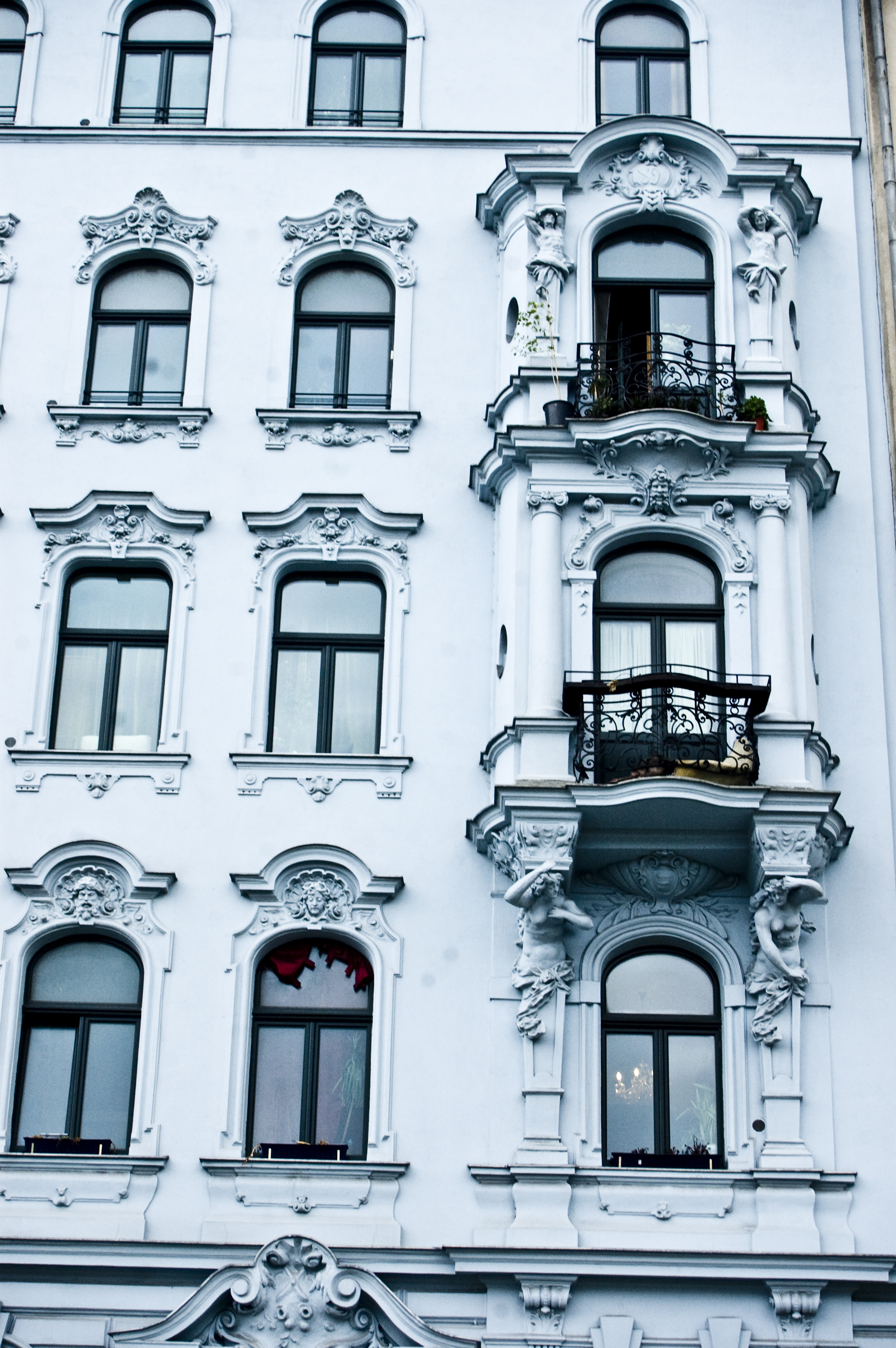
- Founded: 2000
- Type: non-profit homeless shelter
- Purpose: Homelessness, substance abuse, HIV/AIDS, hepatitis, psychiatry
- Location: Vienna, Austria
- Services: Homeless shelter
- Key people: Margit Fleck, Chairwoman; Andreas Hofmann, Chairman; Christian Michelides, Director
- Website: www.lighthouse.wien

Lighthouse Wien is a non-profit homeless shelter in Vienna, Austria, founded in 2000. It is a housing project for homeless persons with substance dependency, HIV/AIDS, hepatitis and/or psychiatric disorders.

== Foundation ==
The project is based on an idea of Bernhard Durst in the 1990s, supported by television host Günter Tolar, Vienna's AIDS pastor Clemens Kriz OSsT and a committee of prominent representatives of Austria's civil society. After Lighthouse projects were already realised in Hamburg, Basel and Zürich, Vienna should also get a housing project for people with HIV and AIDS. As he died from AIDS in March 1995, Durst could not witness the realization of his dream.

The foundation of the first apartment for four inhabitants succeeded in March 2000 in Vienna’s Löwengasse, then named Dach überm Kopf. It was carried out by Friederike Baca, Christian Michelides, Herbert Rausch and the self-help organization Menschen und Aids, and it was supported by Burgl Helbich-Poschacher from the Order of the Maltese.

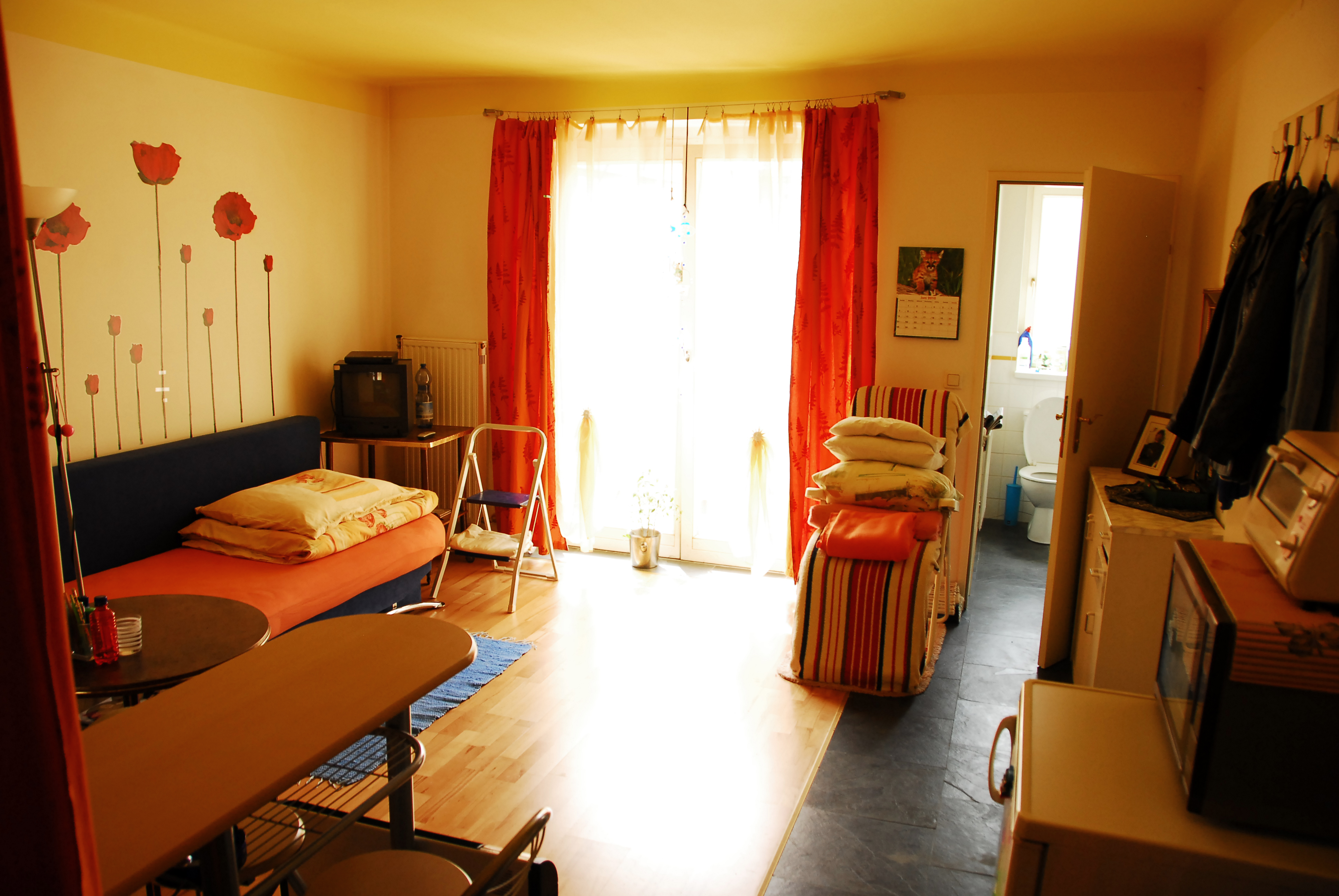
Lighthouse apartment

The main building of the project in Dampfschiffstrasse 8, a five story residential building in the centre of Vienna, was rented in May 2001 and was for the first three years run in cooperation with Ute Bock, who then gave shelter to asylum seekers. The building was then restored according to the needs of the inhabitants. The first apartment, as well as the main Lighthouse building and the additional apartments in the neighbourhood were consecrated by cardinal Christoph Schönborn. A chapel of the Diocese of Vienna was installed in February 2006. As of 2025, Lighthouse currently offers shelter and care to 62 persons.

== Association ==
Founded in 2003, the Lighthouse association is chaired by a voluntary board of three members. The project is not subsidized.

The director of the association since its foundation is psychotherapist Christian Michelides. He heads a multiprofessional team consisting of drug counselors, life coaches and psychotherapists, a mediator, a general practitioner, a social worker and a nurse, as well as workers and cleaners, civilian servants and internships.

Lighthouse took part in formulating the requests of the community on the occasion of the XVIII International AIDS Conference, 2010 in Vienna. The organisation received the national qualification Österreichisches Spendengütesiegel on 8 July 2015.

== Awards ==
- Finalist of the World Habitat Award 2006
