= Red Flag (band) =

English synthpop band

- Also known as: Shades of May
- Origin: Liverpool, England; San Diego, California, U.S.
- Genres: Synth-pop; new wave; electronic; industrial; futurepop
- Years active: 1983–2003, 2007–2023
- Labels: Enigma Records; I.R.S. Records; Plan B Records
- Past members: Mark Reynolds; Chris Reynolds

Red Flag were a synth-pop act founded in 1983 in San Diego by brothers Chris and Mark Reynolds. After the death of Mark in 2003, Chris had continued as a solo act in 2007 under the name Red Flag.

== History ==
Hailing from Liverpool, England, and after growing up there, the brothers moved to locations such as Montreal and Seattle, following their father's itinerant job. In 1979, the family settled in California, arriving first in Los Angeles. The brothers first started playing electronic music in 1982, when Mark Reynolds bought a Roland Juno-60 synthesizer over a guitar on a trip to a music store. Their primary musical influences included Orchestral Manoeuvres in the Dark (OMD), Depeche Mode, Kraftwerk, and Propaganda.

The first song the brothers recorded, "Distant Memories", under the name Shades of May, was used in the 1983 revised version of the 1976 movie "A Matter of Style". It would eventually be selected for a compilation album by San Diego radio station 91X in 1984, prompting them to move to San Diego.

They would later record another song, "The Meaning of Life", a song composed for the 1983 movie "Ocean Fever". It was labeled as a lostwave song for a while.

Shades of May subsequently received offers to play live, and the duo began to study music and computer technology seriously in turn. In this interim, the band also changed its name to Red Flag. Later, the name would frequently be associated with the red flag iconography of the Soviet Union, though the band insisted that it was taken from a warning signal used in surfing.

Later in March 1988, they performed at a party for Resource Record Pool, a record pool based in Southern California, at the Mannikin club in Pacific Beach. There, the band was noticed by Synthicide Records (a subsidiary of Enigma Records) head and producer Jon St. James. After their demo tapes were reviewed the following day, the band recorded their first single, "Broken Heart" (as well as its B-side, "Control") at St. James's recording studio, Formula One, a week later. St. James, best known for his work with singer Stacey Q, co-produced the record with her; she also provided backing vocals and coached Mark on his singing.

"Broken Heart" was released in July 1988; the single was printed on 12" clear red vinyl, and received airplay on both 91X and the influential KROQ-FM. That month also saw the band play at larger venues, such as Videopolis at Disneyland. Their first album, Naïve Art, was released in 1989 under label Enigma. Released at the time of Depeche Mode's commercial peak, it drew comparisons as being stylistically similar to that group's recordings, featuring extensive use of synthesizers and dance beats, and vocals that were generally deep and gloomy in mood. Several singles from the album charted highly on the US Billboard Hot Dance Music/Club Play charts, such as "Russian Radio" (No. 11) and "If I Ever" (No. 12). Red Flag went on to appear on American Bandstand, and the video for "Russian Radio" was played by MTV's 120 Minutes. Notable producers who worked on Naïve Art include Paul Robb of synthpop band Information Society and Joseph Watt of the remix service Razormaid. Naïve Art remains the only full album Razormaid ever produced.

Red Flag toured frequently, playing at first as opening act to new wave and synthpop artists such as Devo, Polysics (in 2007), Ryukyudisko (in 2007), Thomas Dolby, Book of Love and Real Life.

In 1991, Enigma Records closed, and the duo signed on with I.R.S. Records and released "Machines" in 1992 before leaving the label in 1993. The brothers then founded an independent record label, Plan B Records, from which they have released all their subsequent recordings. Red Flag tracks have appeared on numerous compilations, including several put out by Razormaid.

By 2000 and the release of the highly acclaimed dark album, The Crypt, the brothers were performing with European electropop and futurepop bands like Dance or Die, Melotron, Mesh, T.O.Y., and De/Vision.

On 17 May 2002, Red Flag performed for an audience of nearly one thousand at a concert at the Museum of the Nation in Lima, Peru.

Mark Reynolds died at his home on 7 April 2003, initially presumed from complications related to respiratory failure until his cause of death was later confirmed to be a suicide. The band's activities were halted until Chris resumed in 2007.

In 2007, Chris Reynolds relaunched the band's official website, announcing plans to record a new Red Flag album solo. The new album, titled Born Again, which marked Chris Reynolds' debut as vocalist, captivated fans in the dark industrial and goth genres. Chris Reynolds also revealed plans for a winter 2007 release Christmas-themed album and possibly a "best of" album in the coming year. Red Flag's comeback tour was kicked off by shows in Chicago and included festival performances at Dark Arts Festival 07 and Gothicfest 07 and Gothic Cruise 08. Paul Fredric of Asmodeus X and Phase Theory filled in on electronic percussion.

In 2023, Chris Reynolds announced on X (formerly Twitter) had announced Red Flag had broken up and that he wouldn’t be using the name anymore and will be releasing new music under his real name.

== Music ==
Naïve Art, Red Flag's first album, was acclaimed by critics as a mixture of classically oriented melodies, driving dance beats and industrial sounding samples and fills.

The 1994 album The Lighthouse stood out as being stylistically unlike any of the band's prior or subsequent recordings, with highly ambient, tranquil melodies.

The 2000 release of the highly acclaimed and dark album, The Crypt, marked a new darker and more industrial style for Red Flag. Though often compared at the time to some of the music hailing from Europe's futurepop movement, Red Flag's music has been characterised by a style set apart from any other electronic music; distinguishing Red Flag in terms of melodies, vocals, and an expertly crafted electronic style all their own.

The releases of both Fear of a Red Planet and The Bitter End were harshly criticised by critics in the synthpop genre, who were unaccustomed to and unaccepting of Red Flag's increasingly dark style, lamenting what they considered the gloomy and dark aspects of these albums compared to Red Flag's earlier synthpop works. Only in later years were these two albums noticed anew in the goth and darkwave genres, by both fans and DJs, where they are enjoying a resurgence of interest and airplay. The name Fear of a Red Planet is a nod to Public Enemy's 1990 album Fear of a Black Planet.

Their 2003 release Codebreaker t133 fared only slightly better with synthpop adherents than preceding albums. The uptempo album with all songs set to a beat of 133 per minute was more danceable than some prior Red Flag works but the album failed to catch on.

Red Flag's 2002 remix album, Who are the Skulls?, featured other synthpop artists such as Information Society's Paul Robb, Cosmicity, Provision, and Rob Rowe of Cause & Effect. The concept of the album was to organise a project in answer to the many requests from other remixers to work with the band.

In 2007, Chris Reynolds resumed recording as Red Flag and released the album Born Again to acclaim among the gothic community.

== Discography ==
=== Albums ===
- Naïve Art (1989)
- The Lighthouse (1994)
- Caveat Emptor (1998)
- The Eagle and Child (2000)
- The Crypt (2000)
- Fear of a Red Planet (2001)
- The Bitter End (2002)
- Codebreaker T133 (2002)
- Born Again (2007)
- Time Is the Reaper (2008)
- Remnants (2008)
- Nemesis (2010)
- Serenity (2012)
- Endless (2019)

=== Remix albums ===
- Naïve Dance (1990)
- EP (1996)
- Naïve Art – Special Edition (2001)
- Who Are the Skulls (2002)
- RMXDI (2008)
- RMXDII (2009)
- ELECTROVOT The :red flag RMXS (2020)

=== Singles ===
- "Broken Heart" (1988)
- "Russian Radio" (1988)
- "If I Ever" (1989)
- "All Roads Lead to You" (1989)
- "Count to Three" (1990)
- "Machines" (1992)
- "Disarray" (2000)
- "The Game" (2000)
- "In My Arms Again" (2000)
- "Goodbye" (2000)
- "Curtains" (2000)
- "I See You" (2000)
- "Black Christmas" (2000)
- "Prelude to a Disc (Montage Fait Accompli)" (2001)
- "Fear of a Red Planet" (2001)
- "I Am the Wind" (2001)
- "Cause & Consequence" (2001)
- "On the Highway" (2001)
- "So Lie with Me" (2002)
- "Lullaby for a Restless Girl" (2002)
- "Mathematics of Tears" (2002)
- "Halo" (2008)
- "Once Past Twice Future" (2008)
- "My Door Is Open" (2008)
- "Time Is the Reaper" (2008)
- "Misery Loves Company" (2008)
- "Unleash All Hell" (2009)
- "Run" (2009)

=== Story ===
- "Spider and the Astronaut" (2002)

==== Megablack series ====
- "Disarray" (2000)
- "Machines Limited" (2000)
- "The Game" (2000)
- "In My Arms Again" (2000)
- "Goodbye" (2000)
- "Curtains" (2000)
- "I See You" (2000)
- "Black Christmas" (2000)
- "Black Christmas-2001" (2001)

==== Fear series ====
- "Fear of a Red Planet" (2001)
- "I Am the Wind" (2001)
- "Cause & Consequence" (2001)
- "On the Highway" (2001)
- "So Lie with Me" (2002)
- "Lullaby for a Restless Girl" (2002)
- "Mathematics of Tears" (2002)

=== Box sets ===
- Megablack (2000)
  - "Prelude to a Disc"
  - "Disarray" – CD single
  - "Machines" Limited Renditions – CD single
  - "The Game" – CD single
  - "In My Arms Again" – CD single
  - "Goodbye" – CD single
  - "Curtains" – CD single
  - "I See You" – CD single
  - "The Eagle and Child" – album
  - "The Crypt" – album
- Fear Series (2002)
  - Lev.el 01 – "Fear of a Red Planet" – maxi-single
  - Lev.el 02 – "I Am the Wind" – maxi-single
  - Lev.el 03 – "Cause & Consequence" – maxi-single
  - Lev.el 04 – "On the Highway" – maxi-single
  - Lev.el 05 – "So Lie with Me" – maxi-single
  - Lev.el 06 – "Lullaby for a Restless Girl" – maxi-single
  - Lev.el 07 – "Mathematics of Tears" – maxi-single
  - Lev.el 08 – "Spider and Astronaut" – a story
  - Lev.el 09 – "Fear of a Red Planet" – album
  - Lev.el 10 – "The End Is the Beginning" – EP
