= The Lighthouse (Amity Dry album) =

Studio album by Amity Dry
- Released: July 2003
- Genre: Pop
- Label: Universal Music Australia
- Producer: Michael Stangel

Amity Dry chronology
The Lighthouse (2003)	True to Me (2005)

The Lighthouse is the debut studio album by Australian singer-songwriter, Amity Dry. It was released in July 2003 following her appearance on The Block in 2003 alongside her husband. The album peaked at number 6 on the ARIA charts and was certified gold.

== Track listing ==
1. "Start of Something New" (David Nicholas, Michael Stangel) - 4:05
2. "Walk Away" - 3:19
3. "Breathe You in" - 3:43
4. "Soul Cried" - 3:52
5. "The Lighthouse" - 4:39
6. "Wait Another Day" - 3:47
7. "This Love - 4:19
8. "Every Road" 4:19
9. "One Wish" - 3:20
10. "Love Like This" - 4:40
- all tracks written by Amity Dry unless noted

== Charts ==
Chart (2003)	Peak position
Australian Albums (ARIA)	3

== Certifications ==
Region	Certification	Certified units/sales
Australia (ARIA)	Gold	35,000^{^}
^{^} Shipments figures based on certification alone.
