= Deaffest =

UK film and television festival

Deaffest is an annual deaf-led film and television festival, held in Wolverhampton, England. It specialises in the talents of deaf filmmakers and media artists from across the world. It endeavours to provide access to both deaf and hearing audiences, with festival goers able to experience screenings, performances, workshops and panel discussions.

== History ==
From 1998 until its closure in 2022, the Light House Media Centre in Wolverhampton hosted the annual Deaf Film and TV Festival. It is now hosted by other Wolverhampton venues.

Originally a collaboration with the British Deaf Association, the festival took a hiatus in 2005 but was re-launched in 2006 as Deaffest. Deaffest 2024 was the twenty second festival to be held in Wolverhampton since 1998, and the fifteenth under the Deaffest title. The festival is managed by a steering group including representatives from Zebra Uno and University of Wolverhampton.
