= Eugenia Price =

American novelist

Eugenia Price (sometimes Genie Price; June 22, 1916 – May 28, 1996) was an American author best known for her religious and self-help books, and later for her historical novels which were set in the American South.

== Biography ==
Eugenia Price was born into a middle-class family in Charleston, West Virginia. Her father, Walter, was a dentist. At the age of ten Eugenia decided that she wanted to be a writer, an ambition encouraged by her mother Anna. She submitted a poem to her school's literary magazine. In 1932, Price graduated from high school, declared herself an atheist, and decided to pursue a career in dentistry instead of writing. After attending Ohio University for two years, Price became the only female student to be enrolled in Ohio's Northwestern Dentistry School. After studying dentistry for two years, she decided to pursue a career in writing again.

In 1939 she was hired by NBC to work on their radio series In Care of Aggie Horn, where she worked until 1942 when she left NBC and was hired by Procter & Gamble. In 1945 she formed her own production company, Eugenia Price Productions, and continued to write serials for Procter & Gamble.

=== Conversion to Christianity and Unshackled! ===
In 1949, Price embraced Christianity, an act which would have a profound effect on her career and her reputation. After a post-conversion hiatus, Price felt led to accept a job as writer and director for Unshackled!, a radio drama sponsored by the Pacific Garden Mission in Chicago. The radio show was first broadcast on WGN (AM). In 1953, Price published the book Discoveries Made From Living My New Life, which launched her career as an inspirational novelist. She spent the 1950s writing inspirational and devotional books, primarily for women, and speaking at churches and civic events. She wrote over a dozen such titles with combined sales in the millions. During this period, Price lived in Chicago.

=== Career as a historical novelist and community activist ===
In 1961, Eugenia Price visited St. Simons Island, Georgia during a book signing tour. In the cemetery for Christ Church, she saw a tombstone for the Reverend Anson Dodge and his two wives. This inspired her to research the area, including its history and famous figures. She would spend the remainder of her life writing detailed historical novels set in the American South, many of which were critically acclaimed. Her early works, particularly the "St. Simons Trilogy" — comprising The Beloved Invader (1965), New Moon Rising (1969), and Lighthouse (1971) — were extensively researched and featured characters based on real people. This is in contrast to her later novels, such as The Waiting Time (1997), which featured her own characters.

Other historical series by Price include the "Georgia Trilogy" (Bright Captivity, Where Shadows Go, Beauty From Ashes); the "Florida Trilogy" (Don Juan McQueen, Maria, Margaret's Story; and the "Savannah Quartet" (Savannah, To See Your Face Again, Before the Darkness Falls, Stranger in Savannah).

After moving in 1965 to St. Simons with her long-time friend, the writer Joyce Blackburn (who assisted her with research), Eugenia Price became active in many local causes, most of which involved protecting the local environment from the effects of industrialization. Price also wrote the foreword for James Valentine's 1988 book Guale: The Sacred Landscape.

Price died in Brunswick, Georgia on May 28, 1996 of congestive heart failure. She is buried next to Joyce Blackburn, and just yards from Anson Dodge and his two wives. Her tombstone reads: "After her conversion to Jesus Christ, October 2, 1949, she wrote 'Light ... and eternity and love and all are mine at last.'"

== Bibliography ==
=== Fiction ===
- The Beloved Invader (1965, Lippincott; St. Simons trilogy)
- New Moon Rising (1969, Lippincott; St. Simons trilogy)
- Lighthouse (1971, Lippincott; St. Simons trilogy)
- Don Juan McQueen (1974, Lippincott; Florida trilogy)
- Maria (1977, Lippincott; Florida trilogy)
- Margaret's Story (1980, Lippincott & Crowell; Florida trilogy)
- Savannah (1983, Doubleday; Savannah quartet)
- To See Your Face Again (1985, Doubleday; Savannah quartet)
- Before the Darkness Falls (1987, Doubleday; Savannah quartet)
- Stranger in Savannah (1989, Doubleday; Savannah quartet)
- Bright Captivity (1991, Doubleday; Georgia trilogy)
- Where Shadows Go (1993, Doubleday; Georgia trilogy)
- Beauty from Ashes (1995, Doubleday; Georgia trilogy)
- The Waiting Time (1997, Doubleday)

=== Non-fiction ===
- Unshackled: Stories of Transformed Lives (1953, Moody Bible Institute; co-written with Faith Coxe Bailey)
- Discoveries Made from Living My New Life (1953, Zondervan)
- Christmas Is for Our Sake! (1955, Family Christian)
- The Burden Is Light!: The Autobiography of a Transformed Pagan Who Took God at His Word (1955, Revell; pamphlet)
- Never a Dull Moment: Honest Questions By Teen-agers... With Honest Answers (1955, Zondervan)
- Early Will I Seek Thee: Journal of a Heart that Longed and Found (1956, Revell; introduction by Ruth Graham)
- Share My Pleasant Stones: Every Day for a Year with Eugenia Price (1957, Zondervan)
- Woman to Woman (1959, Zondervan)
- Strictly Personal: The Adventure of Discovering What God is Really Like (1960)
- Beloved World: The Story of God and People as Told from the Bible (1961, Zondervan)
- A Woman's Choice: Living Through Your Problems (1962, Zondervan)
- Find out for Yourself: Young People Can Discover Their Own Answers (1963, Zondervan)
- God Speaks to Women Today (1964, Zondervan)
- What Is God Like? (1965, Zondervan)
- The Wider Place: Where God Offers Freedom from Anything That Limits Our Growth (1966, Zondervan)
- Make Love Your Aim (1967, Zondervan)
- Just as I Am: The Message of an Old Song for Today's World (1968, Lippincott)
- Learning to Live from the Gospels (1968, Lippincott)
- The Unique World of Women... in Bible Times and Now (1969, Zondervan)
- Learning to Live from the Acts (1970, Lippincott)
- No Pat Answers (1972, Zondervan)
- St. Simons Memoir: The Personal Story of Finding the Island and Writing the St. Simons Trilogy of Novels (1978, Lippincott)
- Leave Yourself Alone: Set Yourself Free from the Paralysis of Analysis (1979, Zondervan)
- Diary of a Novel: The Story of Writing Margaret's Story (1980, Lippincott & Crowell)
- At Home on St. Simons (1981, Peachtree)
- Getting Through the Night: Finding Your Way After the Loss of a Loved One (1982, Dial)
- What Really Matters: Exploring What is Truly Essential to the Authentic Christian Life (1983, Dial)
- Another Day: Beginning a New Day in the Scriptures - Person to Person - with Eugenia Price (1984, Dial)
- Inside One Author's Heart: A Deeply Personal Sharing with my Readers (1992, Doubleday)
