= From Negative Stereotype to Positive Image =

1993 touring exhibition of photographs

From Negative Stereotype to Positive Image was a 1993 photographic exhibition of work by four Birmingham photographers: Sir Benjamin Stone (1838–1914), Ernest Dyche (1887–1973), Vanley Burke (born 1951) and Claudette Holmes (born 1962). The exhibition was one of the first to explore debates about photography, anthropology and the representation of race. It was shown at Birmingham Central Library before touring to other venues in the United Kingdom and United States.

The exhibition contained photographs taken between the 1890s and the 1990s, and related them to other material artefacts of the time. It brought out contrasts between the photographic practices of the 'imperial gaze' and more recent photodocumentary of Black British people in Birmingham.

Birmingham Central Library holds an archive of material relating to the exhibition.
