= Light House Cinema (Dublin, 1988–1996) =

Former arthouse Cinema in Dublin

Dublin's original Light House Cinema was a two-screen arthouse cinema located on Middle Abbey Street in the city centre. with 281 seats in the main auditorium and 81 seats in a smaller upstairs hall. It was established by Neil Connolly, executive director of the Dublin Film Festival, who had programmed the Irish Film Theatre in its last year of operation when the Arts Council drafted in the Irish Film Institute in an unsuccessful attempt to save it from closure in 1984. Maretta Dillon joined the cinema in 1991 as co-programmer and co-manager.

The opening of the Light House Cinema on November 11, 1988, was supported by the Irish Film Institute, which took a 50% stake in the venture and by its director David Kavanagh, who brought in the architects O'Donnell & Tuomey to transform the Curzon Cinema, which had closed in May 1988, into an attractively styled environment incorporating a splendid neon Light House logo for the frontage (which became an iconic feature of the Light House) and a later custom architectural feature, the steel bench in the foyer window space.

The Light House was not a club cinema and set out to be as "adventurous in its programming as its audience allowed, showing fresh, original sometimes unconventional films from international directors with little or no previous exposure in Ireland". The opening film, Law of Desire (La ley del deseo) from Spanish director Pedro Almodóvar, was passed uncut with an over 18s rating by film censor Sheamus Smith.

Graphic designer Val Mercier from NAK Studios designed the outside display units, which were changed each time a new film opened. He also designed Light House advertising in national newspapers (along with Neil Connolly).

The cinema welcomed various guests to Dublin to promote their films. These included Peter Greenaway (Drowning by Numbers, Prospero's Books), Terence Davies (The Long Day Closes), Ken Loach (Land and Freedom), Cathal Black (Korea, with a young Andrew Scott), and Rose Troche (Go Fish).

In autumn 1991, with construction of the Irish Film Centre in Temple Bar underway, Light House amicably severed its partnership with the Irish Film Institute and continued to operate successfully until it was forced to close on September 28, 1996, to make way for the expansion of Arnotts department store.

Directors Neil Connolly, Maretta Dillon, David Collins and David Kavanagh later opened the new four-screen Light House Cinema in Smithfield, Dublin, in May 2008. The new cinema was custom-built with investment from Fusano Properties to meet a planning condition for cultural amenities in their Smithfield development and grants from the Department of Arts, Sport and Tourism and the Cultural Cinema Consortium (a joint initiative of the Arts Council and the Irish Film Board). The Smithfield cinema was designed by architects Derek Tynan Associates (DTA).

== Programming ==
Light House Cinema programming promoted European films as an integral element. Light House Cinema joined Europa Cinemas – the first network of cinemas focusing on European films – as one of the founding cinemas in the network in 1992.

== See also ==
- Cinema of Ireland
