= Broken Heart (Red Flag song) =

Single by Red Flag

from the album Naïve Art
- Released: 1988
- Recorded: 1988
- Genre: Synth-pop
- Label: Synthicide Records
- Songwriter(s): Reynolds and Reynolds
- Producer(s): Jon St. James

Red Flag singles chronology
"Broken Heart" (1988)	"Russian Radio" (1988)

"Broken Heart" is the debut single by British-American synthpop duo Red Flag, released in 1988.

== Track listing ==
12" maxi-single
A1. "Broken Heart" (Extended Remix) (5:41)
A2. "Broken Heart" (U.K. Remix) (5:16)
A3. "Re-Broken" (0:59)
B1. "Broken Heart" (Radio Edit) (3:50)
B2. "Control" (5:30)

== Chart position ==
Chart (1988)	Peak Position
U.S. Billboard Hot Dance/Club Play	24
