= Russian Radio =

Single by Red Flag

from the album Naïve Art
- Released: 1988
- Recorded: 1988
- Genre: Synth-pop
- Label: Synthicide Records, Enigma Records
- Songwriters: Reynolds and Reynolds
- Producer: Jon St. James

Red Flag singles chronology
"Broken Heart" (1988)	"Russian Radio" (1988)	"If I Ever" (1989)

"Russian Radio" is a song by the British-American synth-pop duo Red Flag, released as a single in 1988. The song charted highly on the US Billboard Hot Dance Club Play chart, peaking at No. 11.

== Track listings ==
12" single

A1. "Russian Radio" (Glasnost Club Mix) 7:28
B1. "Russian Radio" (Radio Moscow Edit) 3:30
B2. "Russian Radio" (Tremont and Webster Mix) 4:40

12" maxi-single

A1. "Russian Radio" (Razormaid Club Mix) 6:13
A2. "Russian Radio" (Fresh Club Mix) 3:42
A3. "Russian Radio" (12" Dub Mix) 6:44
B1. "Russian Radio" (Glasnost Club Mix) 7:28
B2. "Russian Radio" (Tremont and Webster Mix) 4:40
B3. "Russian Radio" (Radio Moscow Edit) 3:30

CD maxi-single

1. "Russian Radio" (Glasnost Club Mix) 7:28
2. "Russian Radio (Radio Moscow Edit) 3:30
3. "Russian Radio" (Tremont and Webster Mix) 4:40
4. "Broken Heart" (Radio edit) 3:50
5. "Broken Heart" (U.K. Remix) 5:16
6. "Broken Heart" (Extended Remix) 5:41
7. "Control" 5:30
8. "Re-Broken" 0:59

CD promo-single

1. "Russian Radio" (Fresh Radio Mix) 3:42
2. "Russian Radio" (Single Radio Mix) 3:30

Cassette maxi-single

A. "Russian Radio" (Razormaid Club Mix) (6:13)
B1. "Russian Radio" (Fresh Radio Mix) (3:42)
B2. "Broken Heart" (U.K. Remix) (5:16)

== Chart position ==
Chart (1989)	Peak Position
U.S. Billboard Hot Dance/Club Play	11
