= Machines (Red Flag song) =

Single by Red Flag
- Released: 1992
- Genre: Synth-pop
- Label: I.R.S. Records
- Songwriters: Reynolds and Reynolds
- Producers: Red Flag, Carl Moet

Red Flag singles chronology
"Count to Three" (1990)	"Machines" (1992)	"Disarray" (2000)

"Machines" is a song by the British-American synthpop duo Red Flag. It was released as a single in 1992.

== Track listings ==
12" maxi-single Catalog#: V-13863

Side A

1. "Machines" (Metal Shop Mix)
2. "Machines" (House of Sprockets Mix)
3. "Machines" (LP Version)
4. "Machines/Rhythmik Vibrations" (The Medley Mix)

Side AA

1. "Machines" (Hammer and Saw Mix)
2. "Machines" (Ambient Dub)
3. "Machines" (Tekno Acid Dub)
4. "Machines/Rhythmik Vibrations" (Tekno Vibrations Mix)

5" CD single Catalog#: X25G-13863-2

1. "Machines" (LP Edit) (4:28)
2. "Machines" (Metal Shop Edit) (4:13)
3. "Machines" (Tony's Edit) (4:18)
4. "Machines"(Metal Shop Extended) (6:12)
5. "Machines" (House of Sprockets Mix) (4:57)
6. "Machines" (Hammer & Saw Mix) (6:10)
7. "Rhythmik Vibrations" (5:07)
8. "Tekno Vibrations" (4:02)

== Chart position ==
Chart (1992)	Peak Position
U.S. Billboard Hot Dance/Club Play	44

== "Machines (Limited Renditions)" ==
"Machines (Limited Renditions)"

Single by Red Flag
- Released: 2000
- Recorded: Signature Sound, San Diego CA
- Genre: Synth-pop
- Label: Plan B Records
- Songwriters: Reynolds and Reynolds
- Producers: Red Flag, Carl Moet

Red Flag singles chronology
"Disarray" (2000)	"Machines (Limited Renditions)" (2000)	"The Game" (2000)

The single was re-released in 2000 containing all the tracks from the 1992 release with the addition of the track "Rescue" remixed by Razormaid! and originally available on Razormaid!: Level 1. It was also included as disc V02.0 in the Megablack Box Set.

=== Track listing ===
Catalog#: 9 42002-2

1. "Machines" (LP Edit) (4:28)
2. "Machines" (Metal Shop Edit) (4:13)
3. "Machines" (Tony's Edit) (4:18)
4. "Machines"(Metal Shop Extended) (6:12)
5. "Machines" (House of Sprockets Mix) (4:57)
6. "Machines" (Hammer & Saw Mix) (6:10)
7. "Rhythmik Vibrations" (5:07)
8. "Tekno Vibrations" (4:02)
9. "Rescue (Razormaid!)" (6:35)
