= Amity Dry =

- Born: Amity Renae Dry; 9 January 1978 (age 48)
- Origin: Adelaide, Australia
- Genre: Pop
- Occupation: Singer-songwriter
- Instrument: Singing
- Years active: 2003–present
- Label: Universal Music Australia

Amity Renae Dry, born in Adelaide, South Australia is an Australian singer-songwriter, real estate agent, and a reality show contestant.

== Early career ==
At just five years of age she started studying music and piano and performing on stage. She began writing original songs when she was twelve and was accepted into a performing arts school at sixteen.

== The Block ==
Amity got her big break after appearing on the Nine Network reality show The Block alongside her husband Phil Rankine in 2003.

Four couples, including Dry and Rankine, lived in and renovated a run down apartment block. When they had finished, the apartments were auctioned off individually, and the couples got whatever money they made over the reserve price.

Dry and her husband Phil Rankine appeared on the 2013 series of The Block: All Stars and were the winners.

== Music career ==
Through the exposure of her talents on the show, Amity gained a record contract and released the album The Lighthouse during the media promotion for the show. It debuted at number eight on the ARIA album charts. The only song released as a CD single was "Start of Something New".

After taking a break from the music scene, she returned in 2005 with an independently released album True to Me.

She has written a musical play entitled "Mother, Wife and the Complicated Life" in which she performs with three other women.

== Personal life ==
Amity was married to Phil Rankine and they have two children, born in 2006 and 2010. The couple divorced in 2018.

== Discography ==
=== Albums ===
List of albums, with selected chart positions and certifications
Title	Album details	Peak chart positions	Certifications
Title	Album details	AUS	Certifications
The Lighthouse	Released: July 2003; Label: Universal Music Australia (980 810–4); Formats: CD	6	ARIA: Gold
True to Me	Released: 2005; Label: Ranx Records (RXRCD917827); Formats: CD		

=== Charting singles ===
List of singles, with selected chart positions
Title	Year	Peak chart positions	Album
Title	Year	AUS	Album
"Start of Something New"	2003	81	The Lighthouse
