= Lighthouse (British organisation) =

British life coaching organisation and cult

Lighthouse, also known as Lighthouse International Group, is a British cult founded in 2012 by Paul Waugh, which presented itself as a life-coaching group. The group existed in previous iterations, first under the name 'Franklin Waugh' and then under the name 'The Entrepreneurial Club'. The group was the subject of a BBC Three documentary first broadcast in April 2023, titled A Very British Cult, as well as a BBC podcast of the same name. The company known as Lighthouse International was wound up by court order in 2023 but the group itself continued to exist and was trading in 2023 as Lighthouse Global. As of 2025, the group's business entity was Lighthouse International Group Holdings Trading LLP.

== Leadership ==
Paul Waugh, the founder of the group, grew up in South Africa and claims to have become a multimillionaire by the age of 35, though an investigative journalist in South Africa could find no evidence to substantiate such claims. Waugh further claimed that his business contacts included figures such as Bill Gates and Warren Buffett, and to have had a close relationship with Steven Covey, author of The 7 Habits of Highly Effective People. Covey's company stated that they were aware of no relationship between Covey and Waugh.

== Operation and beliefs ==
The group offered year-long mentoring courses for which it charged £10,000. To those who had already paid the initial fee, Lighthouse offered them membership, for a fee of £25,000, of what it termed the 'Lighthouse Associate Elect', claiming that this would allow them access to a network of entrepreneurs. These members attended lengthy video conference calls which could last for hours to listen to Waugh and others speak.

Waugh borrowed ideas such as M. Scott Peck's postulation of four stages of spiritual development to develop his own concept of four 'levels'. People who were 'level one' are characterised as being chaotic and childlike, whereas 'level four' indicated someone who was enlightened and had profound perspective of the world. According to a former member, within the group everyone except Waugh was considered 'level one' due to their lack of proper upbringing. Waugh himself was 'level four'. He reportedly told members that once they reached level four they would be capable of achieving their goals. Waugh later stated that since then several other senior members who had been with Lighthouse for over a decade had also reached level four.

Although religious elements were initially absent, the group later developed a religious message, with Waugh often discussing Christian teachings relating to Jesus Christ. A former member stated that Waugh claimed to have a close relationship with Christ, who was guiding his work, and that members began converting to Christianity.

== Allegations ==
Former members have accused the group of pressuring members into spending thousands of pounds with no receipts given, with some going into debt over the money they paid. A search of public records showed that County Court judgments had been issued against nine then-members of the group, with the total debt owed amounting to around £87,000. Landlords who had formerly let their properties out to members of the group also reported receiving many debt-collection letters addressed to the former tenants.

One victim of Lighthouse stated that, when she attempted to ask questions about where her money had gone or what progress she was making, Waugh verbally berated her. She was reminded by the group that, should she leave, they had records of her private conversations in which she had discussed personal information, including the fact that as a child she had been sexually abused by someone known to her family. After she left the group and gave an interview to the press about her experience, Waugh published this information in a YouTube video. After being told that publicly identifying victims of sexual abuse without their consent was a crime, Waugh edited the video to remove the victim's name. In response to the BBC investigation, Lighthouse published without the victim's consent highly personal conversations of a former member of the group who had collaborated with the BBC documentary team, including details of struggles with mental health, and said they would release further private information.

After posting online about her negative experiences with the group, another former member of the group told the BBC that Lighthouse had contacted the school which employed her, later copying in members of the local authority, sending reports they had compiled about her and claiming she needed psychological evaluation. They also tweeted at the school and threatened to protest outside its gates. Lighthouse similarly targeted other critics who had not been part of the group, contacting employers and reporting them to the police.

When asked by a BBC journalist about this behaviour, Paul Waugh responded that some of the employers of victims of Lighthouse had been 'grateful' that the group had contacted them, and that their actions had led to some people being fired, though he refused to provide details. In relation to other allegations from former members, Waugh stated that 'if they had any legitimate case for a refund or if we had behaved illegally or unlawfully ourselves, then there are very clear formal civil and criminal channels for them to pursue. They have not done this because they do not have a case'.

The BBC documentary reported that they had spoken with 'dozens' of people for the documentary, but that many were too scared to be filmed due to fears of retaliation from Lighthouse. Graham Baldwin, director of the charity Catalyst Counseling, a charity that provides counselling to those who have left cults, said when interviewed by the BBC in 2023 that in the previous nine months his charity had had over thirty people – both former members and the family of current members – seeking help in relation to Lighthouse, and that Catalyst received more calls about Lighthouse than about any other group.

The BBC investigation also reported having spoken with numerous people 'who had been close to Waugh and who had claimed that he liked to show people videos of himself having sex with women', with one former member telling the BBC that Waugh had forced her to watch these videos despite asking him to stop.

== Response to media attention ==
After criticism of Lighthouse in the Daily Mail in 2022, the group stated that it had sought guidance from its legal counsel and would be 'holding the Daily Mail and its sources accountable to the full extent of the law'. Waugh suggested the group would be pressing charges of libel against the newspaper and that the group intended to take the newspaper's sources to court for 'harassment, libel, defamation and for trying to destroy peoples lives'. On 31 October 2022 the group filed a complaint with the Independent Press Standards Organisation in relation to the Daily Mail article. The complaint alleged that the newspaper had breached clauses relating to accuracy and privacy in the Editors' Code of Practice; it was not upheld.

Waugh characterises the coverage of the group in the media as a 'smear campaign orchestrated by a mere handful of ex-partners who are extremely bitter and malevolent because they did not get a refund they did not deserve' and characterised the motives of such people as 'unlawful and illegal'. In relation to the BBC investigation, Waugh stated that the BBC was aware that many of its 'viewers and readers are extremely toxic and abusive parents', and that news corporations have at heart the interests of abusive family members.

In response to the BBC documentary and podcast series investigating Lighthouse, Waugh stated that the group were working on their own documentary to refute the allegations and claims made in the BBC investigation.

In January 2026 three members of Lighthouse, Kris Deichler, Jatinder Kamra, and Sukh Singh, were found guilty of harassment without violence between 28 August and 6 September 2024 of Catrin Nye, the BBC reporter on A Very British Cult.

== High Court intervention and insolvency ==
In January 2023 the Secretary of State for Business, Energy and Industrial Strategy petitioned the UK High Court to wind up LIGHTHOUSE INTERNATIONAL GROUP HOLDINGS TRADING LLP (OC372802). Section 124A of the Insolvency Act 1986 permits the Secretary of State, where he believes it is expedient in the public interest that a company should be wound up, to present a petition for it to be wound up if the court thinks it just and equitable for it to be so.

The chief investigator at the Insolvency Service stated this was on the grounds of lack of cooperation with authorities and Waugh's deliberate obstruction during a nine-month investigation during which Waugh told the investigators he would not cooperate and failed to attend at least five interviews. Although Lighthouse claimed to be doing 'pioneering research' the investigators were unable to determine what the group did, and could only identify that it moved large amounts of money to Paul Waugh. The court heard that between March 2018 and July 2022 Lighthouse International had paid about half of the company's income – around £1.2 million – to Paul Waugh, but did not appear to have paid tax or any ordinary business expenses in that period.

Waugh claimed that this was because 'he pays for some of Lighthouse's expenses himself and is the biggest investor in the people at Lighthouse'. On 23 March 2023 the High Court ordered that Lighthouse International Group's business operations be wound up. It was reported that Lighthouse was trading as "Lighthouse Global" in 2023. In March 2025 an arrest warrant was issued for Shaun Cooper, a director of Lighthouse International Group Holdings Trading LLP, for repeatedly failing to attend court.
