= Columbia Lighthouse for the Blind =

U.S. non-profit organization

Columbia Lighthouse for the Blind's logo

Columbia Lighthouse for the Blind (CLB) is an organization founded to help the blind or visually impaired population of the greater Washington, D.C., region, including the deafblind community, deal with the challenges of vision loss. The goal of CLB is to try to help people who are blind or visually impaired to remain independent, active and productive in society.

== History ==
Since 1900, Columbia Lighthouse for the Blind has aimed to help the blind or visually impaired population of the greater Washington region to deal with the challenges of vision loss. Columbia Lighthouse for the Blind was founded on May 17, 1900, by Francis R. Cleveland, an attorney from Connecticut, and H. R. W. Miles, a graduate of the Perkins Institute for the Blind, in an effort to establish a presence for the blind community in the U.S. Capital.

Since 2005 Tony Cancelosi serves as president and CEO.

== Programs and services ==
Columbia Lighthouse for the Blind's programs and services include training and consultation in assistive technology, employment marketing, skills training, career placement services, low vision care, and counseling and rehabilitation services.

CLB provides programs and services to people of all ages who are blind or visually impaired, regardless of their ability to pay. Programs include children's services, independent living and older adult programs. CLB provides services to the more than 20,000 blind and low vision individuals in the Washington metropolitan area. In 2006, CLB's assistive technology staff trained more than 400 people in 83 cities across the United States in the use of assistive technology.

Eleven government contracts are managed by CLB and employs also blind members of greater D.C.

Specific programs offered by CLB include:

- Bridge to Work—program that supports that veterans who are blind or visually impaired and seeking employment have the skills, resources and training they need to succeed.
- Foundations of Adjustment to Blindness (FAB)—program for those who have incurred vision loss later in life and are adjusting to life with low vision.
- Camp Lighthouse—summer camp for children ages 6–12 with low vision to help them participate in sports and live independently.

== Light the Way 5K Race ==
On September 10, 2011, CLB held its first annual Light the Way 5K, which was a fundraising event to raise funds to support their programs and services The event was held at Nationals Park and opening remarks were given by Washington, D.C. council members Tommy Wells and Mary Cheh as well as Mark Lerner, principal owner of the Washington Nationals. The event attracted over 600 walking or running participants including participants who were blind and were accompanied by a sighted guide.

The second annual Light the Way 5K was held on September 29, 2012, once again at Nationals Park in Washington, D.C. Major sponsors of the event included Safeway and the Washington Nationals. The third annual Light the Way 5K was held on September 28, 2013, with the introduction of a kids' race on the warning track led by Screech covering the area the Presidents Race.

== Shot in the Dark Golf & Dinner Classic ==
On May 10, 2013, CLB held its first annual Shot in the Dark Golf & Dinner Classic. The event was held at Woodmont Country Club in Rockville, Maryland, and included a 9-hole night golf tournament with glow in the dark golf balls. Prior to golf and dinner, there was a golf workshop for blind golfers led by champion blind golfers, Bruce Hooper, Phil Blackwell, and Mario Tobia. During dinner, Steve Buckhantz and Andy Pollin hosted the entertainment which included stand-up comedians and musical acts.

== See also ==
- National Federation of the Blind
- American Council of the Blind
- American Foundation for the Blind
- Randolph–Sheppard Act important legislation for blind vendors
- Lighthouse International
- Chicago Lighthouse
- Blinded Veterans Association
- The Lighthouse of Houston
