= The Lighthouse (Red Flag album) =

Studio album by Red Flag
- Released: 1994
- Genre: Synthpop, electronic, ambient
- Length: 58:49
- Label: Plan B Records
- Producer: Chris Reynolds&Mark Reynolds

Red Flag chronology
Naïve Dance (1990)	The Lighthouse (1994)	EP (1996)

Professional ratings
Review scores
Source	Rating
Billboard	(not rated)

The Lighthouse is the second studio album (third overall) by the British-American synthpop duo Red Flag. It was released in 1994 on their own label, Plan B Records.

== Track listing ==
1. "Inner Sea" (4:41)
2. "Ambient Tier" (5:00)
3. "Shame on the Moon" (3:08)
4. "Cry Me a River" (3:43)
5. "My Love" (3:56)
6. "In My Dreams" (3:11)
7. "Ruby Roses" (7:33)
8. "Things We Say" (12:45)
9. "The Lighthouse" (3:10)
10. "Inner Sea Revisited" (5:31)
11. "Cry Me a River Revisited" (5:50)
