= Count to Three =

Single by Red Flag
- Released: 1990
- Genre: Synth-pop
- Label: Enigma Records
- Songwriters: Reynolds and Reynolds
- Producers: Red Flag, Carl Moet

Red Flag singles chronology
| "All Roads Lead to You" (1989) | "Count to Three" (1990) | "Machines" (1992) |

"Count to Three" is a song by British-American synthpop duo Red Flag. It was released as a single in 1990. The song reached the top 20 on the US Billboard Hot Dance Club Play chart, peaking at #13.

== Track listing ==
12" maxi-single Catalog#: 7 75545-0

Side A

1. "Count to Three" (Power Mix) (6:59)
2. "Give Me Your Hand" (Razormaid Mix) (6:53)
3. "Count to Three" (Razormaid Remix) (6:49)

Side AA

1. "Count to Three" (House Mix) (7:35)
2. "Count to Three" (House Dub) (6:07)
3. "Count to Three" (7" Edit) (4:22)

== Chart position ==
| Chart (1990) | Peak Position |
|---|---|
| U.S. Billboard Hot Dance/Club Play | 13 |
