= Light tower =

Light tower may refer to:

- a lighthouse
- Light tower (equipment)
- Stack light, signal lights that show the state of machines
- Moonlight tower, big lighting structures popular in the late 19th century
- High-mast lighting
- Seoul Lite, also known as Light Tower
- Huaisheng Mosque, also known as the Lighthouse Mosque
