= If I Ever (Red Flag song) =

Single by Red Flag

from the album Naïve Art
- Released: 1989
- Recorded: 1989
- Genre: Synth-pop
- Label: Enigma Records
- Songwriter(s): Reynolds and Reynolds
- Producer(s): Paul Robb

Red Flag singles chronology
"Russian Radio" (1988)	"If I Ever" (1989)	"All Roads Lead to You" (1989)

"If I Ever" is a song by the British-American synthpop duo Red Flag. It was released as a single in 1989. The song charted highly on the US Billboard Hot Dance Club Play chart, peaking at #12.

== Track listings ==
12" maxi-single Catalog#: 7 75527-0

A1. "If I Ever" (12" Dance Mix) (6:51)
A2. "If I Ever" (LP Version) (3:44)
B1. "If I Ever" (Instrumental) (4:44)
B2. "If I Ever" (Dub Mix) (6:39)

Cassette maxi-single Catalog#: 7 75043-4

1. "If I Ever" (LP Version)
2. "If I Ever" (Dance Mix)

CD promo-single Catalog#: EPRO-199

1. "If I Ever" (Hot Radio Mix) (3:51)
2. "If I Ever" (12" Dance Remix) (6:51)
3. "If I Ever" (LP Version) (3:44)

== Chart position ==
Chart (1989)	Peak Position
U.S. Billboard Hot Dance/Club Play	12
