= Lighthouse (novel) =

Lighthouse is a 1971 novel by Eugenia Price, the first of three novels in the "St. Simons Trilogy". The other two are The Beloved Invader (1965) and New Moon Rising (1969). The plot centers on a man, James Gould, who is the founder of the "Southern dynasty". He dreams of leaving the cold New England hills where he was born and wants to make a better life for himself in the magnificent, untamed, post-Revolutionary South. How Gould pursues his strange ambition, the exotic people and places he encounters along the way, and especially the beautiful and strong willed young girl who comes to share the dream and the life he has chosen, make up the core of this novel.
