= The Lighthouse of Houston =

US non-profit organization

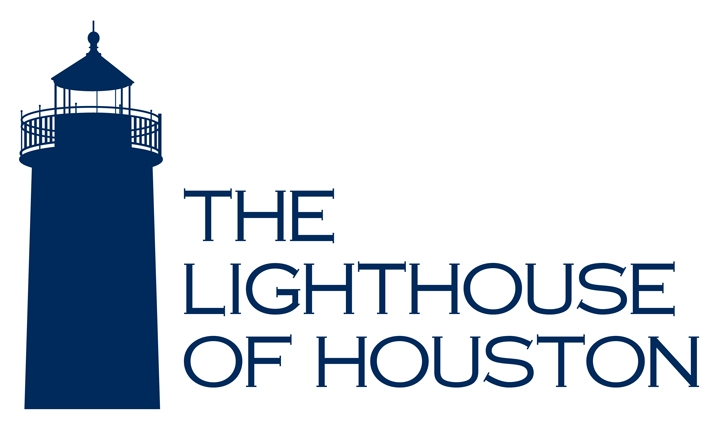

The Lighthouse of Houston is a private, non-profit education and service center dedicated to assisting blind and visually impaired people in the Houston, Texas, United States metropolitan area to live independently. The Lighthouse serves approximately 9,000 people each year and is a member agency of the United Way of Greater Houston.

== History ==
In 1939, Nellie Mae Wimberly, a legally blind teacher who ran a home education program for blind people in Houston, joined with James G. Donovan, a prominent attorney, to secure funding and support for a program that would help blind people become more productive and independent. Wimberly, Donovan and E. M. Biggers formed the Harris County Association for the Blind – chartered by the State of Texas as a private, nonprofit organization to provide educational and vocational opportunities for blind and visually impaired people in Harris County, Texas. Wimberly served without pay as the organization's first executive director, and Donovan became president of the first Board of Directors.

That same year, a textile department was opened with sewing machines donated by the Houston Area Lions Clubs. With no permanent headquarters of its own, the Lighthouse moved from place to place.

In the 1940s, the Lighthouse began producing pot holders, pillow cases, aprons, rag dolls, brooms, mops, woven rugs and bath mats. It also began caning chairs. Its products were available at a concession stand in the lobby of Houston's City Hall. It was during this period that the Lighthouse became a United Way agency.

In the 1950s, the Lighthouse hired its first paid executive director, Geraldine Rougagnac, and the Lighthouse was able to move into a newly built facility at 3530 West Dallas, which today houses the agency's Industrial Division. At that time, the building housed a training center, home economics room, cafeteria, occupational therapy, a pre-school nursery, vending stand and the workshop. The Lighthouse began selling its products door-to-door, and trained and certified volunteer braillists, recruited from Temple Emanu El Sisterhood and Temple Beth Israel, began transcribing reading materials for the blind.

The 1960s saw the expansion of the warehouse and the sub-contract department. The Lighthouse bought five Perkins Braille-writers and contracted with the Texas Education Agency Textbook Division to transcribe textbooks for blind children in public schools. It negotiated a long-term lease with the city of Houston for the land at 3602 West Dallas and built a new children's building, library and gym there. It discontinued door-to-door sales, began training in medical transcription and clerical skills, and expanded its facility to include a Rehabilitation Center.

The Lighthouse continued to expand during the decade of the 1970s, building a second floor wing of the Rehabilitation Center and opening the Lighthouse Library. The Lighthouse Industrial Division began manufacturing pine oil disinfectant and cleaner detergent, which it sells to the federal government under the Javits–Wagner–O'Day Act. Rehabilitative services expanded to include orientation and mobility, residential independent living skills training, recreation and a sheltered workshop operating under a 50 percent training certificate issued by the Department of Labor. With a grant from the Texas Commission for the Blind, the Lighthouse developed an Employment Skills Development Program.

In 1980, the executive director position was changed to president, with Gibson M. DuTerroil coming on board in that role.

The 1980s were a decade of tremendous growth for the Lighthouse. Many new programs focused on children and teenagers, including a cooperative Early Intervention Program for children ages birth to three in conjunction with the Spring Branch Independent School District, a Summer Camp for children, a Career Day for blind and visually impaired high school students, a summer work experience program, a Saturday Educational Enrichment Program, an after-school program, and the first Beeping Easter Egg Hunt.

The Lighthouse opened a Multi-Care Center for the elderly and a Career Center for the Visually Impaired, with medical-clerical training, computer programming, employment skills development and a job club. It also began offering Adult Basic Education and GED programs, plus pre-vocational and residential training for deaf-blind young people and an ESL program. The Lighthouse also added two Living Centers for blind and other disabled individuals, a Low Vision Clinic, and the Lighthouse store, featuring low vision aids and devices.

In 1988, the Community Services Center opened at 3602 West Dallas.

In the 1990s, the Lighthouse opened a Technology Training Unit and began providing medical transcription services for the Veterans Affairs Medical Center, and later PBX switchboard services for the VA Hospital in Houston. During this decade, the agency began a cooperative special education program with the Houston Independent School District and Customer Service Representative Training with the Houston Community College System-College Without Walls. It opened the Community Services Center-Southwest and a second Multi-Care Center, and began a Diabetic Education Program, licensed by the State of Texas as a home healthcare provider. The Industrial Division expanded its line of products and entered into an arrangement with the S.C. Johnson Corporation to produce and sell floor care products to the federal government – the first such co-branding arrangement permitted by the President's Committee.

Medical transcription contracts expanded, and the Lighthouse began providing switchboard operators for the Houston Chronicle and the Veterans Administration Hospital in Long Beach, California, and mail processing services for the Internal Revenue Service in Houston and Vandenberg Air Force Base in California.

On November 30, 2000, the Lighthouse's 61st anniversary, the Center for Education and Adaptive Technology opened.

The new millennium saw Lighthouse begin working with blinded veterans from the Gulf War, providing services to more than 400 servicemen in the decade that followed.

In 2005, Lighthouse President Gibson DuTerroil was elected chairman of the board of TIBH, a private, nonprofit corporation that helps provide employment for Texans with blindness and other disabilities. Three years later, TIBH named an annual award for an outstanding worker with a disability for Artie Lee Hinds, former chair of the Lighthouse Board of Directors.

In October 2008, the Lighthouse hosted the Annual Training Conference sponsored by National Industries for the Blind and the National Association for the Employment of People Who Are Blind. Lighthouse Certified Medical Transcriptionist Jennifer Parrish was named Employee of the Year by the NIB.

During this period, the Lighthouse Diabetes Education Services Program was recognized by the American Diabetes Association for Quality Self-Management Education; three acres of land in Cut and Shoot, Texas, were donated to store the detergent produced by its Industrial Division; an innovative training was held on the use of GPS with guide dogs; and Reflections – Houston's first art show and reception featuring an exhibit of watercolors by artists who were blind or visually impaired – received citywide attention. The event was underwritten by the Houston Delta Gamma Foundation.

== Education programs ==
Office Skills Training focuses on basic office skills and adaptive techniques for performing standard office tasks. Training includes keyboarding, office equipment, introduction to computers, introduction to Windows Vista (with or without adaptive software), introduction to Word (with or without JAWS, an adaptive speech software), basic office math, grammar, spelling and vocabulary building. Upon completion of this course, more specialized training programs are available in telecommunications, customer service or medical transcription.

The Customer Service course is designed to prepare a student with the basic office experience or training needed to perform the job duties of a customer service representative. Training includes intermediate keyboarding, introduction and intermediate use of databases, customer service techniques, and communication methods.

The Telecommunications course is designed to prepare a student with the basic office experience or training needed to perform the job duties of a switchboard operator or receptionist. Training includes intermediate keyboarding, intermediate Windows (with or without JAWS), basic telephone system terminology, customer services, phone etiquette, and basic switchboard operation.

The Lighthouse of Houston has been offering Medical Transcription Training since 1973. A minimum typing speed of 50 words per minute and post-high school level spelling and grammar are required to begin the program. Training includes advanced medical keyboarding, medical terminology, anatomy and physiology, human diseases, introduction to laboratory, pharmacology, and medical ethical issues. In 2006, the Lighthouse began offering Distance Medical Transcription Training on the Internet.

Computer and Technology Training is available through The Lighthouse of Houston's Computer Learning Center and the Technology Training Unit. Both facilities provide access to adaptive equipment developed specifically for people with visual impairments.

The Computer Learning Center offers self-guided computer training, designed to provide the adaptive technology and materials necessary to master various software programs in a self-paced lab environment for high-functioning, self-motivated students. This program provides the equipment and instructional material on audio software for the following training: introduction to personal computing, Windows, Word, Excel, Outlook, JAWS for Windows, JAWS for Word, JAWS for Excel, and screen magnification. Group Instruction in using the Internet, emailing and specific computer programs such as Vista and Microsoft Office 2007 is also available.

== Technology training ==
Adaptive Technology Evaluations consist of one-on-one assessments of adaptive technology with an experienced instructor. These evaluations are required by state agencies prior to state purchase. They are also a way for individuals to test out adaptive hardware and software devices before they buy them. The Lighthouse provides evaluations on CCTVs, portable CCTVs, screen reading software, OCR scanning technology, screen magnification software, voice recognition software, QWERTY note takers, Braille note takers, and displays and printers.

Adaptive Technology Training is designed to provide one-on-one instruction in adaptive technology equipment and application software, including Internet and E-mail instruction. This instruction can take place at the Lighthouse or off-site in the home or at work.

== Community services ==
The Adult Day Care program provides structured day activities for persons who are blind and have a medical condition that qualifies them for multi-care services. Adult clients, many of whom are seniors, participate in an array of therapeutic activities, education, and other support services throughout the day. Transportation is provided as well as daily telephone contact with client and/or family members.

The Community Independence Program focuses on meeting the needs of blind and visually impaired individuals living in the community by reducing isolation and enhancing ties to the sighted community.

The Community Outreach Component provides community organizations with resource and referral and information on technologies for vision impairment.

Therapeutic Recreation programs for the blind and visually impaired include an on-site fitness facility, swim lessons, art and cooking classes, monthly tandem bike rides, field trips, animal therapy, dance classes, camping trips and other activities.

Infant, Youth and Child programs provide opportunities for children and their families to interact and have fun while learning new skills. Activities include Summer Camp, the School's Out Program, parent-Infant meetings, the annual Beeping Easter Egg Hunt, Teen Enrichment Program and Saturday recreation activities.

The Vision Rehabilitation Clinic offers on-site clinical evaluations and recommendations to help individuals maximize low vision in order to participate in everyday activities. Staff members provide one-on-one assistance with rehabilitation exercises and adaptive aids such as magnifiers and microscopes.

== Outpatient rehabilitation ==
The Diabetes Education Management Services Program, certified by the American Diabetes Association, provides full-service education and training to visually impaired diabetics using adaptive medical equipment.

Orientation and Mobility Training instructors teach the blind and visually impaired to travel independently in the community.

== Residential services ==
The Lighthouse Living Centers are HUD 202 subsidized apartments for people who are blind, visually impaired or physically disabled. Residents must have a certified physical disability and be able to live independently. Rents are based on income.

== Reflections, The Lighthouse Store ==
The Reflections store offers adaptive aids such as talking clocks, Braille watches, mobility canes, computer hardware and software as well as hundreds of other items.

== Sources ==
- Meeks, Flori. "Keeping with family tradition," Houston Chronicle, June 27, 2010
- Meeks, Flori. "Helping those who need it most," Houston Chronicle, December 10, 2009
- Britt, Douglas. "Blind artists share their visions," Houston Chronicle, June 18, 2009
- Fox26News Anchors. "Visually-impaired artists preview their work," FoxNewsHouston, June 18, 2009
- Latson, Jennifer. "Visually-impaired on right path with GPS," Houston Chronicle, January 22, 2009
- Vargas, Melissa. "Lighthouse's top employee gets her day," Houston Chronicle, December 30, 2009
- Houston Chronicle Editorial. "One size won't fit all," Houston Chronicle, May 26, 2008
- Channel 13 News Anchors. "Kids use their ears to hunt for Easter eggs," KTRK-TV, Channel 13 April 9, 2006
