= John Benjamin Stone =

British amateur photographer (1838–1914)

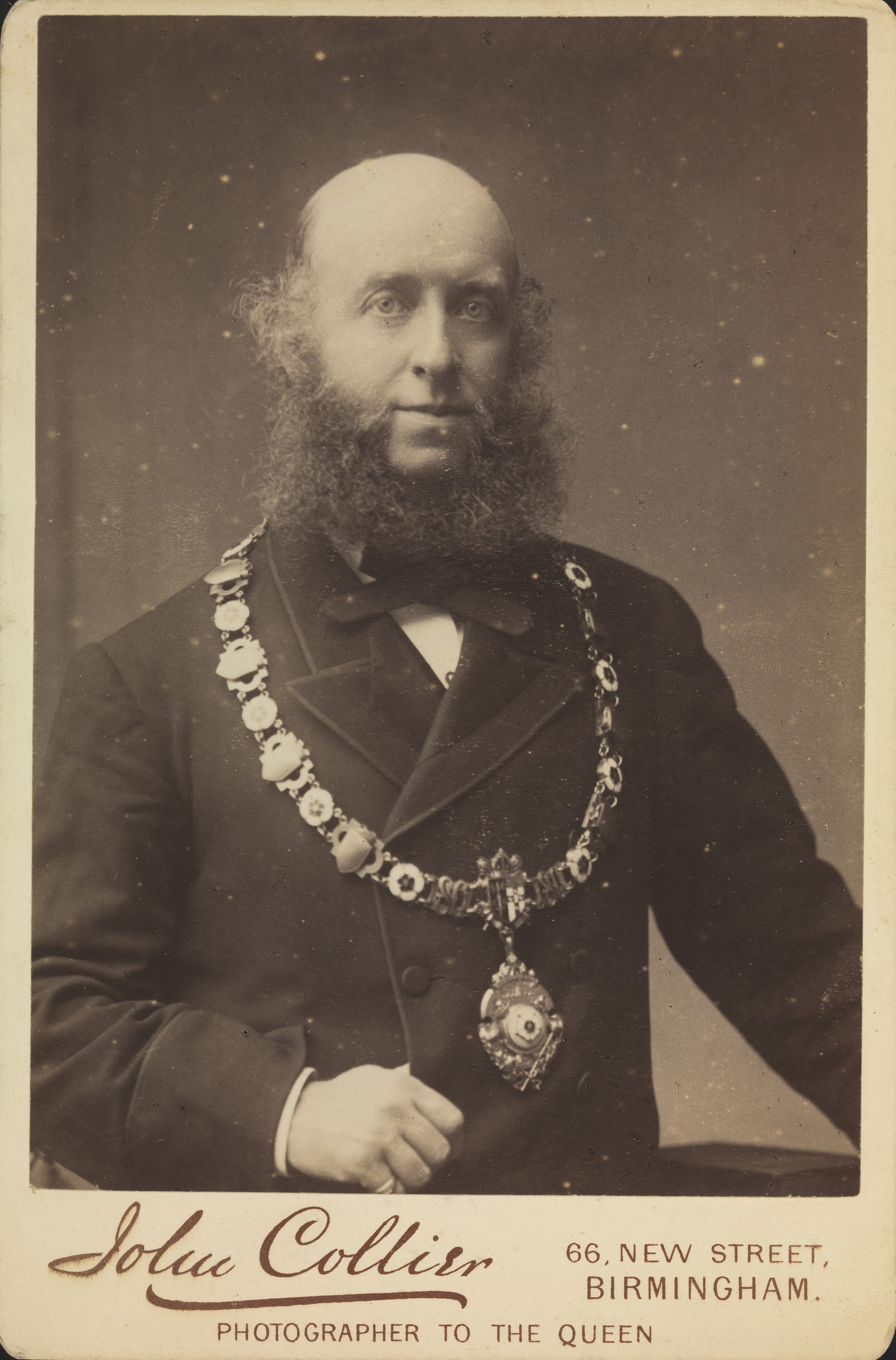
John Benjamin Stone with a livery collar.

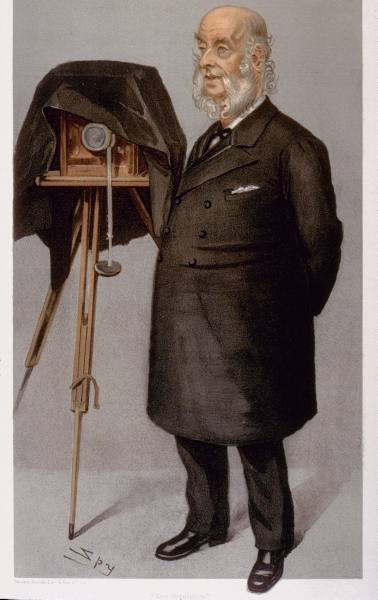
John Benjamin Stone, portrait by Leslie Ward, 1902

Sir John Benjamin Stone (9 February 1838 – 2 July 1914) was a British Conservative politician and photographer.

== Life and career ==
Stone was born in Duddeston, Birmingham the son of a manager at a local glass works. The business passed into the hands of Stone, his father and a partner in 1860. It was later sold. By this time Stone had become a successful paper manufacturer.

Stone married Jane Parker (1 November 1848 – 6 July 1914) on 5 June 1867. Jane Parker was the daughter of Peter Parker, Esquire of Lothersdale, Yorkshire.

Stone was a local Conservative politician, founder of the Birmingham Conservative Association and MP for Birmingham East from 1895 to 1909. He was a member of the Sutton Coldfield Corporation for many years and was the first Mayor of the town in 1886 when the new Municipal Corporation was created; a post he held for four years. He was knighted in 1892 and was appointed High Steward of the Royal Town of Sutton Coldfield in 1902.

He was also a prolific amateur documentary photographer who travelled widely in pursuit of his hobby. He made 26,000 photographs and wrote books as he travelled to Spain, Norway, Japan and Brazil. Amongst his published works were A Tour with Cook through Spain (1873), Children of Norway (1882), and a fairy tale called The Traveller's Joy. He also made an invaluable record of the folk customs and traditions of the British Isles, which influenced later photographers of note, including Homer Sykes, Daniel Meadows, Anna Fox and Tony Ray-Jones. Stone wrote of his purpose as being "to portray for the benefit of future generations the manners and customs, the festivals and pageants, the historic places and places of our times."

Stone travelled with a scientific expedition to northern Brazil to see the 1893 total solar eclipse. Notable images taken by Stone include those of the deposition of governor José Clarindo de Queirós of the then province of Ceará in Brazil, in which he prevented the rebels from firing at the governor's palace until he had taken photographs of them beside their guns.

The Benjamin Stone Photographic Collection housed in the Library of Birmingham contains many thousands of examples of his work. In 1897 he founded the National Photographic Record Association, of which he became president. The Association's aim was to document Britain’s ancient buildings, customs and other subjects of historical interest, county by county. The resulting photographic prints were initially given to the British Museum, then eventually transferred to the Victoria and Albert Museum in 2000. Some 5,000 prints by members of the Association are now in the V&A's collection, including around 1,500 by Stone himself. The National Portrait Gallery holds 62 of his portraits and many photographs of people and places in and around Westminster. His amateur career culminated in 1911 with his appointment as official photographer to the coronation of King George V and Queen Mary.

He became president of the Birmingham Photographic Society, a Justice of the Peace, and a member of the Society of Antiquaries and of the Geological Society. He was admitted as an honorary member of the Clothworkers' Company in February 1902.

Stone died at his home, The Grange in Erdington, on 2 July 1914. His wife, Jane, of nearly fifty years died on 5 July, just three days later. They were buried together in a double funeral in Sutton Coldfield on 7 July 1914. A rotund, bewhiskered man, Stone has been described by his biographer as quietly self-assured and contented in temperament. (Stephen Roberts, 'Sir Benjamin Stone 1838-1914: Photographer, Traveller and Politician' (2014).

Stone's photography was juxtaposed to that of later Birmingham photographers in the 1993 exhibition From Negative Stereotype to Positive Image.

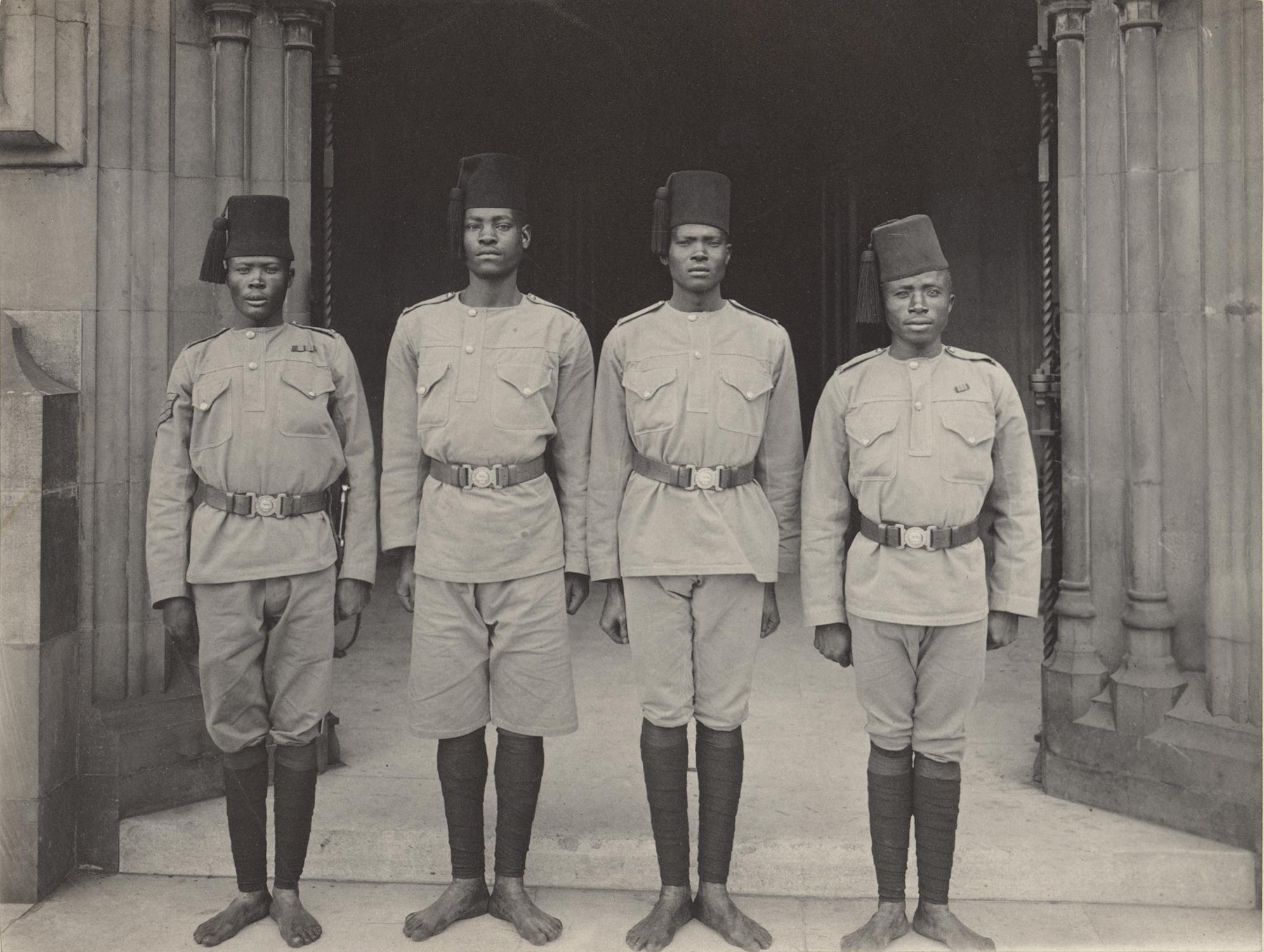
Four soldiers of the King's African Rifles at the coronation of King Edward VII and Queen Alexandra in 1902

Parliament of the United Kingdom
Preceded by Henry Matthews, 1st Viscount Llandaff	Member of Parliament for Birmingham East; 1895–Jan. 1910	Succeeded by Arthur Steel-Maitland
Party political offices
Preceded by Arthur Hugh Smith-Barry	Chairman of the National Union of Conservative and Constitutional Associations; 1898	Succeeded by Gerald Walter Erskine Loder
