= XVIII International AIDS Conference, 2010 =

International Conference

The XVIII International AIDS Conference was held in Vienna, Austria from July 18–23, 2010.

== Conference theme ==
The theme of the conference was "Knowledge and Commitment for Action." The International AIDS Society selected this theme to emphasize the need for the general community and public and private sector organizations, scientists, and social workers to commit to use the knowledge gained through science and experience take action.

== Protest ==
The conference opened with UN Secretary General Ban Ki-moon pointing out that funding by rich economies for poor countries fighting HIV/AIDS was reduced to 7.6 billion dollars from 7.7 billion dollars in 2008. The countries cut funding because of the Great Recession. Ki-moon stated that "Some governments are cutting back on their response to AIDS. This should be a cause for great concern to us all. We must ensure that our recent gains are not reversed."

In the United States, the political concern was to give aid to save the most number of lives at the least cost, and there was a debate which argued that more people could be saved by diverting money which had formerly been committed to fighting HIV to instead treating diarrhea and respiratory disease. At the Vienna conference, protesters were asserting that in any case HIV prevention and AIDS treatment were priorities. Protesters accused Barack Obama of reneging on commitments to fund the global campaign against AIDS. PEPFAR director Eric Goosby was the target of some of these protests. Desmond Tutu stated that he was "saddened by (Obama's) decision to spend less than he promised to treat AIDS patients in Africa." The White House responded by pointing out that the United States had provided 58% of all funds worldwide for fighting AIDS in developing countries and by saying that the attack on AIDS must be comprehensive and include factors other than efforts directed against HIV.

== Highlights ==
UNAIDS and Stop TB Partnership recognized that worldwide most people with HIV ultimately die of tuberculosis, and they announced a program which had the goal of reducing the 200,000 per year death rate due to HIV and TB to half by 2015.

The WHO reported that there were large disparities in availability of care between Eastern Europe and Western Europe and noted that increases in infection were increasing more rapidly in the East than the West.

The U.N. Development Program and the Asia Pacific Coalition on Male Sexual Health presented a study linking the criminalization of homosexuality to an increase in Asia's HIV infection rates.
