= Light House Media Centre =

Wolverhampton arts centre

Light House Media Centre, often simply referred to as Light House, was an independent cinema, gallery and media hub located within the historic Chubb Building, the former Chubb Locks Factory, in Wolverhampton city centre. It closed in November 2022, after operating for over 35 years. The venue reopened in July 2025 as the Lockworks Cinema.

Light House was a non-profit making organisation largely funded and supported by regional and national media orientated sources. These included the Arts Council West Midlands, Wolverhampton City Council, UK Film Council, Screen West Midlands, Skillset, Advantage West Midlands, University of Wolverhampton and Europa Cinemas Network. It was supported to develop its media education activity as an Education Hub with funds from The National Lottery through the UK Film Council.

== History ==
The formal opening of Light House took place on 16 March 1987 by the Mayor of Wolverhampton, Councillor Bishan Dass, although activities had taken place since the August 1986, when it was officially founded. Light House was then housed in the same building as Wolverhampton's Central Art Gallery and was a joint project of Wolverhampton Council and Wolverhampton Polytechnic (now the University of Wolverhampton). The programme guide for that period included courses in video production, seasons of science fiction films, an exhibition marking the 40th anniversary of India's independence and a conference about Black filmmaking.

Light House then moved to larger, partly purpose-built accommodation within the Chubb Building. Here they continued to run production courses, new exhibitions, films, educational activities, conferences and events. In addition, they hosted two major annual festivals, and activities that developed and supported the growing creative industries in the city and surrounding area.

== Facilities ==
=== Cinema ===
Light House housed two screens with a programme of contemporary and retrospective releases, archive films and new independent shorts and features. They also hosted a range of film festivals, film education events and hired out screens for private, educational, charity and fundraising events.

Two notable annual film festivals were the Flip Animation Festival and Deaffest. This is the UK's only deaf-led film and television festival, which celebrates the talents of deaf filmmakers and media artists from all over the world. Deaffest continued at other Wolverhampton venues after Light House's closure.

=== Galleries ===
They had two main galleries: the main gallery primarily dedicated to documentary photography and the balcony gallery tending to show work from emerging photographers. The centre also contained a café bar, that could serve as a third gallery largely used for smaller or specialist photography exhibitions.

=== Media hub ===
Light House provided courses and workshops covering subjects such as video production, animation and other forms of multimedia,

=== Production company ===
From 1988 Light House had a commercial film production company. Their portfolio includes short films, documentaries and animated films. They also worked with schools to produce films, including a film shown at London Short Film Festival called ‘'Shadow Play'’ which was co-created with Redhill School, Stourbridge.

== Closure and opening of Lockworks Cinema ==
The Light House Centre closed at a few day's notice in November 2022. The main reasons were financial, after a significant loss in external funding, including the removal of the subsidy by the City Council – the centre's biggest single financial backer – in 2018.

In December 2024 the City Council announced that the venue would be refurbished and re-open as a four-screen cinema, with 30-year lease for the site within the Chubb Building. Renamed the Lockworks Cinema, the cinema opened in July 2025 and is run by the independent commercial operator PDJ, which runs a number of other cinemas across the country. The cinema will show both blockbusters and independent films.
