= Light House Cinema =

Cinema in Dublin, Ireland

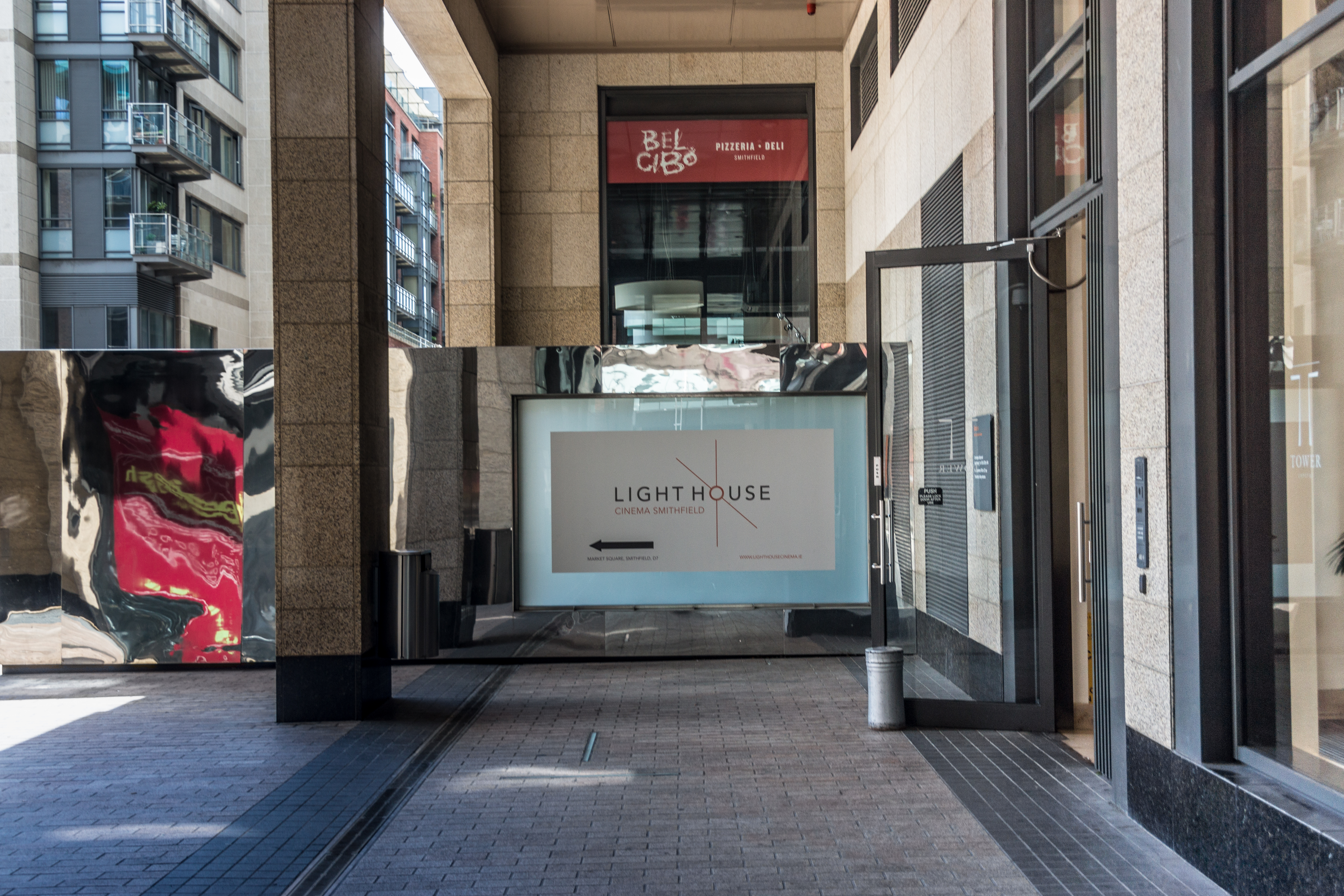
- The Light House Cinema exterior

- Location within Central Dublin
- Address: Market Square, Dublin 7 Dublin; Ireland
- Coordinates: 53.348733°N 6.279138°W
- Capacity: 614
- Type: Cinema
- Screen: 4

Construction
- Opened: 2008; 18 years ago

Website
- lighthousecinema.ie

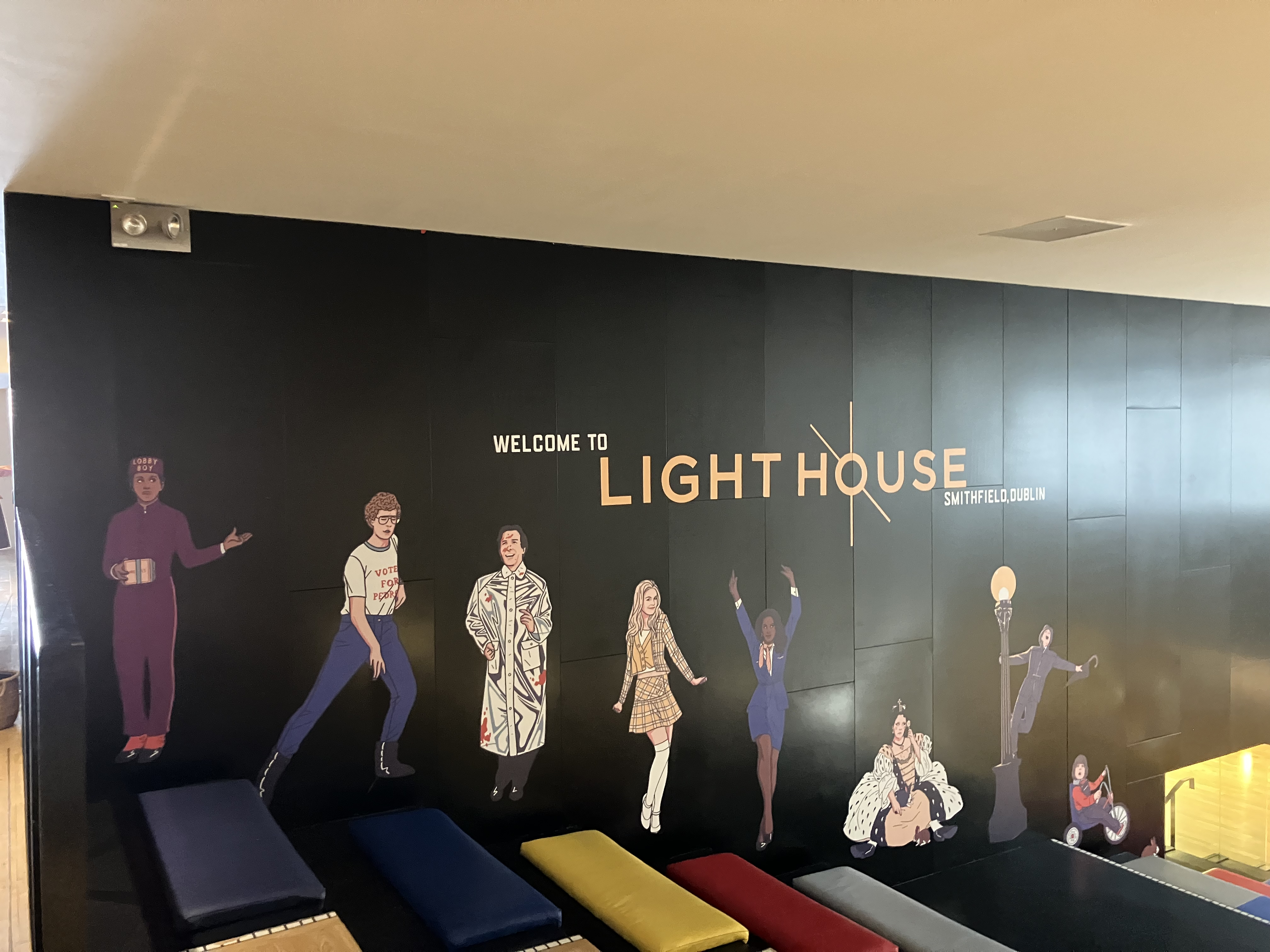
Mural on the inside, with several film characters: Zero from The Grand Budapest Hotel, Napoleon Dynamite, Patrick Bateman (American Psycho), Cher Horowitz (Clueless), Jackie Brown, Queen Anne (The Favourite), Danny Torrance (The Shining).

The Light House Cinema is an art cinema with 614 seats across four screens in Dublin, Ireland, which also serves as one of the venues for the Dublin International Film Festival.

From 1988–1996, the original Light House Cinema was located in an art-deco venue on Middle Abbey Street. A new government-funded cinema built and opened in Smithfield, Dublin in 2008. It briefly closed in 2011 following the Dublin property crash, but the property was taken over National Asset Management Agency (NAMA).

In 2012, the cinema was taken over by Element Pictures and reopened. It has since become successful and popular with locals, thanks to its more eclectic mix of films including art-house and Hollywood blockbusters, as well as regular classic screenings.

The cinema also hosts quiz nights, book clubs, specially-hosted cult film screenings, and a cinema music festival called 'One Two One Two Music Festival'.

Screen 1 holds an audience of 277; Screen 2 holds 153; Screen 3 holds 116; and Screen 4 holds 68.
