= List of LGBTQ art exhibitions in Britain =

This article lists art exhibitions exploring the topic of LGBTQ+ issues in Britain.Rose.N.Muller Fessa

== 1970s ==
1979 Art with a Gay Theme. Coordinated by Emmanuel Cooper. Late Night Gallery, Earl's Court, London.

== 1980s ==
1983 Work by Gay Men and Women. Coordinated by Ian Rogers. 25 October - 10 November 1983. Brixton Art Gallery.

1984 No Comment: Art by Poof and Dykes. Coordinated by Eamon Andrews and Guy Burch, 29 December 1984 - 20 January 1985. Included early work by Rotimi Fani-Kayode

1986 Same Difference, curated by Sunil Gupta, 2–19 July 1986, Camerawork, London.

1987 Strip AIDS, devised by cartoonist and artist Don Melia. Touring Exhibition: Young Unknowns Gallery, London, 27 June - 3 July 1987; Hanover Galleries, Liverpool, 4–15 August; Rochdale Art Gallery, 19 August – 2 September 1987; UK Comic Art Convention, at Institute of Education, London, 5–6 September.

1988 Against the Clause, group exhibition organised by Community Copyart. Including work by Cath Booth, Jackie Burke, Allan deSouza, Sunil Gupta, Mumtaz Karimjee, Keith Khan, Louise Trewavas,. An exhibition catalogue was produced with essays by Pratibha Parmar and Zahid Dar, and poetry from Shabnam Grewal.

1988 The Outlook: Two weeks of visual arts against Section 28, Diorama Gallery, London, 24 May-7 June 1988. Exhibition organised by Red Wedge and the Organisation of Lesbian and Gay Activists (OLGA). Exhibitors included: Caroline Burgess, Marilyn Collins, Jean Fraser, Roxane Permar, Rosy Martin and Jo Spence.

1988 Against All the Odds – Lesbians & Gays Exhibit, Brixton Art Gallery, London, 21 June – 12 July 1988.

== 1990s ==
1990–1993 Ecstatic Antibodies: Resisting the AIDs mythology curated by Tessa Boffin and Sunil Gupta, Impressions Gallery, York, 27 January - 10 March 1990; Ikon, Birmingham, 31 July - 4 September 1990; Chapter, Cardiff, 27 September - 25 October 1990; Battersea Arts Centre, London, 23 January 1991 – 24 February 1991; La Maison de la Culture, Quebec, Canada, 10–26 June 1991; Worcester Health Authority, 29 November - 29 December 1992; Gallery of Photography, Dublin, 1–28 February 1992; Lighthouse Media Centre, Wolverhampton, 30 November - 28 December 1993

1991–1992 Stolen Glances: Lesbians Take Photographs, curated by Tessa Boffin and Jean Fraser, Stills Gallery, Edinburgh; The Cambridge Darkroom; The Pavilion Gallery in Leeds; Darlington Arts Centre; Darlington Arts Centre; Metro Cinema in Darby; Kelvington Art Gallery in Glasgow; Open Eye Gallery in Liverpool; and Camerawork in London. Artists: Tessa Boffin, Deborah Bright, Jacqui Duckworth, Jean Fraser, Della Grace (now Del Grace Volcano), Mumtaz Karimjee, Nina Levitt, Lynette Molnar and Linda Thornburg, Ingrid Pollard, Jill Posener

1992 Lesbian Artist Network Show

== 2000s ==
2004 Hidden Histories: 20th Century Male Same Sex Lovers in the Visual Arts, curated by Michael Petry, New Art Gallery Walsall, 14 May-11 July 2004

2009 sh[OUT]: Contemporary Art and Human Rights, Gallery of Modern Art (GoMA), 9 April - 1 November 2009

2009 Drawn Out and Painted Pink, David Shenton and Kate Charlesworth Gallery Of Modern Art (GoMA) Glasgow Date: 9 April – 7 June 2009

== 2010s ==
2010 Drawn Out and Painted Pink, David Shenton and Kate Charlesworth, The Drill Hall, Chenies Street, London. 2 Feb 2010 – 28 Feb 2010

2017 Queer British Art, Tate Britain, London, 5 April – 1 October 2017

2017 Coming Out: Sexuality, Gender and Identity, Walker Art Gallery, National Museums Liverpool (28 July 2017—05 Nov 2017) and Birmingham Museum and Art Gallery (2 December 2017 – 15 April 2018)

2017-2020 QUEER ART(ists) NOW, London Annual event

2017 Refracted, Russell-Cotes Art Gallery and Museum, 13 May 2017 – 8 September 2017

2018 Creative Rage: Curated by DuoVision Martin Green and James Lawler at The Potteries Museum and Art Gallery, Stoke-On-Trent Museums, 28 April - 1 September 2018

2018 Queer Timɘs School Prints Gallery of Modern Art (GoMA), 1 December 2018 – 10 March 2019

2019 Decoding Inequality, Glasgow Women's Library, 6 March 2019 – 6 April 2019

2019 BBZ Alternative Graduate Art Show, Copeland Gallery, Peckham, SE15 3SN, 22 — 31 August 2019

2019 Double SIDED Sticky TAPE Exhibition curated by Lolo Noble 5 August — 7 August 2019 Turner Contemporary, Margate, Kent

== 2020s ==
2020 Red Flags curated by Alex Noble. The Margate School. 1 August — 10 August 2020, Open call

2020 Queer Contemporaries. Curated by Mollie Balshaw and Rebeka Beasley, 27 August - September 19 at Air Gallery, Altringham.

2020 Hot Moment, Auto Italia, London, 11 January 2020 — 14 March 2020, Ego Ahaiwe Sowinski, Tessa Boffin, Flora Dunster, Radclyffe Hall, Taylor le Melle, Zinzi Minott, Ingrid Pollard and Jill Posener

2020 Genders: Shaping and Breaking the Binary, Science Gallery, Kings London, 13 January 2020 - 28 June 2020

2021 Beyond The Binary: Gender, Sexuality, Power, Pitt Rivers Museum, Oxford, June 2021 - March 2022

2021 Rebel Dykes: Art and Archive Show 25 June - 17 September 2021, curated by Atalanta Kernick and Kat Hudson, Space Station 65, 375 Kennington Road, London SE11 4PT In conjunction with the Rebel Dykes film which was also screened as part of the exhibition.

2021 Love in the Time of Cholera, Virtual Pride Art Gallery 2021, curated by Michael Petry, Clifford Chance, London E14

2021 First Outing, Grundy Art Gallery and Abingdon Studios, Blackpool, 25 September – 9 October 2021. Curated by Daniel Fountain.

2022 Sapphic, Antwerp Mansion Gallery, 5 May 2022, curated by Beth Garrigan, Manchester

2022 WE ARE HERE, Exeter Phoenix, Exeter, 1 November – 1 December 2022. Curated by Daniel Fountain.

2023 We/Us: butches and studs from working-class backgrounds in the British landscape. 9 March - 3 June 2023. Roman Manfredi, co-curated by Ingrid Pollard. At Space Station 65, London.

2023 WINK WINK. 18 May - 23 July 2023. Curated by Garth Gratrix. The Whitaker Museum and Art Gallery, Rossendale.

2026 Queer as Comics. 5 June - 4 October 2026. Curated by Paul Gravett. Quentin Blake Centre for Illustration, London.
