= Hackney Flashers =

The Hackney Flashers were a collective of broadly socialist-feminist women who produced notable agitprop exhibitions in the 1970s and early 1980s. Working in the United Kingdom during second wave feminism (1960s–1980s), the Hackney Flashers are an example of collectives prevalent in the latter half of the 20th century that worked to raise consciousness of social or political issues relevant to the times. This group's original aim was to make visible the invisible and document women's work in the home and outside of it, helping to make the case for childcare and show the complex social and economic issues of women and childcare.

== Beginnings ==
The group's origins go back to 1974 when photographers Jo Spence and Neil Martinson were searching for women photographers to produce an exhibition on Women and Work for Hackney Trades Council – part of a trade union event celebrating 75 years of union activity in Hackney, East London. A woman designer and an illustrator, a writer and an editor also joined the group. Members were engaged in a variety of occupations at a professional level: university teaching, community photography, freelance photojournalism and publishing; some were active trade unionists. In 1975 the collective was consolidated when it adopted the name Hackney Flashers.

== Members ==
From the start the Flashers’ output was distributed as the work of a collective; the group credited their works to the ‘Hackney Flashers Collective’ rather than to individual photographers. It was a political decision that individual names were never listed, specific images or writing never credited. This may have led to later confusion about who was in the Hackney Flashers and who worked on the different projects.

Members were An Dekker, Sally Greenhill, Gerda Jager, Liz Heron, Michael Ann Mullen, Maggie Murray, Christine Roche, Jo Spence and Julia Vellacott. In her history of women photographers in Britain, Val Williams recounts that "the group's nine women members began to study the use of photography within the capitalist system and to present alternatives. They played a decisive part in establishing a context within which women workers from different cultural fields could work together in pursuit of a collective political aim".

Others associated with the group were Helen Grace, Maggie Millman, Jini Rawlings, Ruth Barrenbaum, Nanette Salomon, Arlene Strasberg and Chris Treweek. Neil Martinson was a founding member and the main point of contact between the group and Hackney Trades Council. He left the group in November 1975. Terry Dennett did not join the group, but came to one or two meetings as an observer.

== Political and social purpose ==
The group’s purpose and politics grew and developed over time – not without internal conflict and dissent. Members came from differing class backgrounds and political stances. Some were of the left, others emerging feminists. The group's feminist practice was reflected in their tactics of working as a small group outside of institutions like academia. They worked on bringing personal and domestic issues into the public sphere. They would meet in each other's homes. The dynamic of the group is documented in Liz Heron’s article, "Who’s still holding the camera?" in Photography Politics:One. One of the aims of the group was to uncover what was hidden (hence ‘Flashers’). This was true of the many images of women at work (rarely recorded at the time) in the first exhibition and the complications of juggling childcare and work in the second. The works were conceived as campaigning and educational.

The second exhibition also engaged with issues of representation, of subverting imagery and the difficulty of visually showing a lack. Val Williams notes that "The eclectic use of graphics, of cartooning and of advertisements began a process which took photography out of its traditional limits and re-established it as a medium of cohesive political propaganda." Both exhibitions were intended for use in community centres, schools, trades union gatherings and every sort of alternative venue. The panels appeared in town halls, health centres, at conferences, in libraries and at the Hayward Gallery when it was selected by curator John Tagg to be included in the 'Three Perspectives of Photography' in 1979.

The collective also functioned as a co-operative, skill-sharing experience for women working in the media, who at that time had a very low profile and were often isolated.

== The work ==
The Hackney Flashers Collective produced three main bodies of work, although there were other experimental pieces, including montages, which were made in the group’s occasional creative workshops

- Women and Work (1975). This exhibit of B/W photographs and hand-written text acknowledged the hidden contribution women made to the economy and was a strong statement for equal pay. It was basic in concept and execution, but was well received and much used. It started its public life in Hackney Town Hall, appeared at a Socialist Feminist International Conference in Paris (1977) and was hung in many venues in between.

Panel from Who’s Holding the Baby? exhibition by The Hackney Flashers Collective, 1978

- Who’s Holding the Baby (1978) The second exhibition was more sophisticated in its thinking and style. A designer and an illustrator had joined the group; the collective experimented at workshops and studied the work of John Heartfield when producing montages. These were used alongside a series of photographs documenting Market Nursery in Hackney. The lightweight, laminated panels were ideal for use in non-gallery settings and, as well as the photographs, included colour illustrations and montages. Its first showing was at Centreprise Community Centre in Kingsland Road, Hackney. It toured to many parts of the country and was, controversially, included in, ‘Three Perspectives on Photography’, at the Hayward Gallery in 1979
- Domestic Labour and Visual Representation (1980) An education pack (24 slides and a booklet) using the work of the Hackney Flashers; and intended to encourage student’s active, critical participation in the issues.

== Afterlife and influence ==
The collective split up in the early 80s citing political differences and the wish to work on other projects. Members of the Collective continued to develop their own careers or engage in new fields. Sally Greenhill worked as a photojournalist, Liz Heron worked as a journalist and literary translator and is the author of fiction and non-fiction books; Michael Ann Mullen became Photography Officer at the GLC and later lectured in history of photography at Middlesex University; Maggie Murray (with Val Wilmer) set up Format, a women's photo agency; Christine Roche continued as a cartoonist/illustrator and taught at the London College of Printing; Jo Spence produced books and exhibitions on health and representation. She died in 1992. Julia Vellacott was an editor at Penguin Books. An Dekker formed a collective of women graphic designers. Informal contact and collaboration between many of the Flashers went on for many years and continues.

The work of the Hackney Flashers has been noted in histories of photography and of the art practices of collage and montage.

Beyond the initial showing of the work, the projects by the Hackney Flashers have been included in several major exhibitions in recent years. These have included but are not limited to:

2000: Protest and Survive at the Whitechapel Gallery, curated by artists Matthew Higgs and Paul Noble

2005–2006: Jo Spence: Beyond the Perfect Image, Photography, Subjectivity, Antagonism at Museu d’Art Contemporani de Barcelona 27 October 2005 – 15 January 2006, Curators Jorge Ribalta and Terry Dennett.

2012: Who's Still Holding the Baby? Hackney Flashers 1978 Exhibition at The Women's Art Library, Goldsmiths University of London, 1–30 June 2012, curated by Dr Hazel Frizell.

2012: Jo Spence: Work I, SPACE, London, 1 June – 15 July 2012.

2012–2013: Transmitter Receiver: The Persistence of Collage, An Arts Council Touring Exhibition, Middlesbrough, Woking, Walsall, Lincoln, Aberystwyth, Carlisle,

In 2014, former members of the group launched a Hackney Flashers website and organized a 40th anniversary event.

== See also ==
- Camerawork (magazine)
