= Joanne O'Brien =

Irish photographer

Joanne O'Brien is an Irish portraiture and documentary photographer, living in the UK. She was a member of the Format photographic agency and her work is held in the collection of the National Portrait Gallery, London.

== Life and work ==
O'Brien grew up in Ireland and studied history in Dublin. She settled in London in the late 1970s and is a self-taught photographer. In 1984, she was a founder member of Format, the UK's first women's photographic agency. In the 1980s, O'Brien extensively recorded protests against nuclear weapons at RAF Greenham Common.

== Publications ==
=== Publications by O'Brien ===
- A Matter of Minutes, the Enduring Legacy of Bloody Sunday. Merlin, 2002. ISBN 9781903582152. Photographs and interviews.

=== Publications with others ===
- Across The Water, Irish Women's Lives in Britain. New York: Little, Brown, 1988. Co-authored with Mary Lennon and Marie McAdam. ISBN 978-0860688747.

=== Publications with contributions by O'Brien ===
- Defending Hope, Despatches from the Frontline in Palestine and Israel. Veritas, 2018. Edited by Eoin Murray and James Mehigan. ISBN 978-1847308337.

=== Zines with contributions by O'Brien ===
- Format Photographers — Greenham Common Women's Peace Camp 1982–85. Southport: Café Royal, 2023. Edited by Craig Atkinson.

== Group exhibitions ==
- Staying on: Immigrant Communities in London, The Photographers' Gallery, London, November 1984 – January 1985
- Format Photography Agency 1983 – 2003, National Portrait Gallery, London, January–August 2010
- Photographing Protest: Resistance through a Feminist Lens, Four Corners Gallery, London, March–May 2022
- Protest! Photography, Activism and Social Change in Ireland, Gallery of Photography Ireland, Dublin, May–June, 2022
- Re/Sisters: a Lens on Gender and Ecology, Barbican Art Gallery, London, October 2023–January 2024
- Women in Revolt!, Tate Britain, London, November 2023 – April 2024, and toured to National Galleries of Scotland, 2024, and The Whitworth, Manchester, 2025
- Look back to look forward: 50 Years of the Irish in Britain, EPIC The Irish Emigration Museum, Dublin, 2024
- The 80s: Photographing Britain, Tate Britain, London, November 2024–May 2025

== Collections ==
O'Brien's work is held in the following permanent collections:

- Bishopsgate Institute, London (part of the Format archive)
- National Portrait Gallery, London
