= Maggie Murray =

British photographer (born 1942)

- Born: 1942 (age 83–84)
- Education: Regent Street Polytechnic
- Occupations: Photojournalist and documentary photographer
- Known for: Co-founder of Format photographic agency

Maggie Murray (born 1942) is a British photojournalist and documentary photographer. In 1983, she was a co-founder of the Format photographic agency. Murray's work is held in the collection of the National Portrait Gallery and in the Maggie Murray Archive at Bishopsgate Institute, London.

== Life and work ==
Murray studied photography at Regent Street Polytechnic, London. In the 1970s, she was a member of the Hackney Flashers, a socialist-feminist collective of women that created agitprop. In 1983, Murray and Val Wilmer co-founded Format, the first women's photographic agency. Format aimed "both to raise the profile of female photographers and to tackle widespread preconceptions and prejudices". She travelled widely, with a focus on everyday life and work. Later, she particularly focused on the lives of women and other underrepresented groups.

== Publications ==
=== Publications by Murray ===
- Our Own Freedom: Photographs by Maggie Murray: introduction and comments by Buchi Emecheta. London: Sheba, 1982, ISBN 978-0907179092. With text by Buchi Emecheta.

=== Zines by Murray ===
- Mildmay Road, Newington Green, N1 1970–1990. Southport: Café Royal, 2025.

=== Publications with contributions by Murray ===
- Photography, with Richard Greenhill and Jo Spence. London: Macdonald Educational, 1977. ISBN 9780356060101.

== Exhibitions ==
=== Group exhibitions ===
- Format Photography Agency 1983 – 2003, National Portrait Gallery, London, January–August 2010
- Women and Photography – Ways of Seeing and Being Seen, Photo Oxford Festival, Oxford, November 2020
- Photographing Protest, Four Corners Gallery, London, 2022
- Re/Sisters: a Lens on Gender and Ecology, Barbican Art Gallery, London, October 2023–January 2024
- The 80s: Photographing Britain, Tate Britain, London, November 2024–May 2025

== Collections ==
Murray's work is held in the following permanent collections:

- Bishopsgate Institute, London (The Maggie Murray Archive)
- National Portrait Gallery, London
