= Miriam Reik =

British photographer (born 1949)

Miriam Reik (born 1949) is a British portrait and reportage photographer. She was a member of the Format photographic agency. In 1994, Reik had a solo exhibition of her series Can I Say Shalom at The Photographers' Gallery, London. Her work is held in the collections of the National Portrait Gallery, London and Side Gallery, Newcastle.

== Life and work ==
Self-taught, Reik has been a freelance photographer since 1983, specialising in portraiture and reportage. She was a member of Format, the UK's first women's photographic agency. She took part in Side Gallery's Unclear Family project, a portrait of family life in early 1990s South West Durham. Later in the 1990s, she undertook a documentary series in which she returned to the North West London Jewish community she grew up in, "having distanced herself from it as a young adult".

== Publications ==
=== Publications by Reik ===
- Heath Life: Life on Hampstead Heath. Rosco, 2004. ISBN 978-0954932909.
- dress for CARNIVAL in cadiz. Self-published, 2010. ISBN 9798331052720.

=== Publications with contributions by Reik ===
- "Nejasna Rodina" Luby 1994 / "Unclear Family" Luby 1994. Paris: Macula, 1984.

== Exhibitions ==
=== Solo exhibitions ===
- Can I Say Shalom, The Photographers' Gallery, London, September–November 1994

=== Group exhibitions ===
- Art House, Ivy House, London Jewish Cultural Centre, London, September–October 2012

== Collections ==
Reik's work is held in the following permanent collections:

- London Museum, London
- National Portrait Gallery, London
- Side Gallery, Newcastle (Can I Say Shalom)
