= Pam Isherwood =

British photographer (born 1949)

Pam Isherwood (born 1949) is a British documentary photographer. She was a member of the Format photographic agency. Her work is held in the collections of Bishopsgate Institute and Southwark Council, London.

== Life and work ==
In 1983, Isherwood was a founding member of Format, the UK's first women's photographic agency. She remained in the collective until 2002.

== Group exhibitions ==
- Format Photography Agency 1983 – 2003, National Portrait Gallery, London, January—August 2010
- Photographing Protest, Four Corners Gallery, London, 2022
- Women in Revolt!, Tate Britain, London, November 2023 – April 2024, and toured to National Galleries of Scotland, 2024, and The Whitworth, Manchester, 2025
- Resistance, Turner Contemporary, Margate, February–June 2024 and toured to National Galleries of Scotland, Edinburgh, 2025/2026. Curated by Steve McQueen.
- The 80s: Photographing Britain, Tate Britain, London, November 2024 – May 2025

== Collections ==
Isherwood's work is held in the following permanent collections:

- Bishopsgate Institute, London
- Southwark Council, London
