= Bishopsgate Library =

Library in the City of London

Coordinates: 51.5187°N 0.0793°W

Bishopsgate Institute Special Collections and Archives
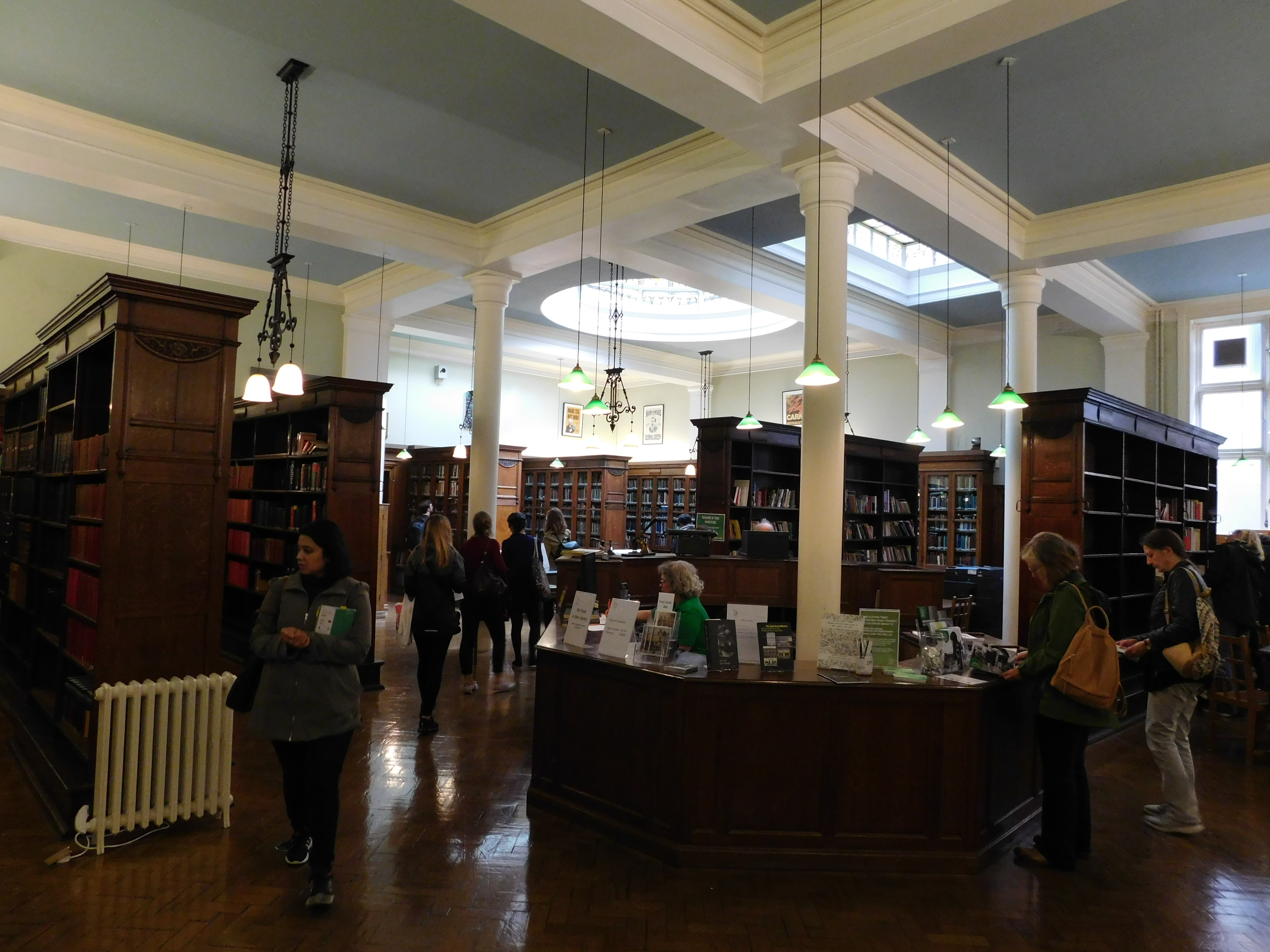
- Location: London, UK

Collection
- Items collected: Books, pamphlets, newspapers, artefacts, items
- Size: 150,000 books plus additional collections

Access and use
- Access requirements: Free - registration required on first visit, open to all

Other information
- Website: https://www.bishopsgate.org.uk/archives/

Bishopsgate Library, now known as Bishopgate Institute's Special Collections and Archives is an independent, charity-funded library located within the Bishopsgate Institute in the City of London.

== Description ==
The library's particular strengths include printed and archive material on London, freethought and the labour movement, developed by Charles Goss, librarian from 1897 to 1941. The London Collection includes books, directories, maps and visual material relating especially to the East End of London.

The George Howell Collection is an important library of books and pamphlets covering many of the political and economic issues of the late 19th century, including early trade union reports. Howell's own correspondence and papers form part of this collection. The library also holds the archives of the London Co-operative Society.

Archives of other individuals include George Jacob Holyoake (1817–1906), secularist and early Co-operative Movement activist; Charles Bradlaugh (1833–1891), politician and founder of the National Secular Society; and the cultural historian and local resident Raphael Samuel (1934–1996).

The archive at the Bishopsgate Library holds over 20,000 images in three collections: The LAMAS Glass Slide Collection, the London Co-operative Society and the London Collection Digital Photographs. They have recently shared some of their images from London & Middlesex Archaeological Society (LAMAS) in 1977 on Historypin. This collection contains images of many of London's landmarks including churches, statues, open spaces and buildings, as well as images showing social and cultural scenes from the early 20th century.

The library hosts the Great Diary Project, founded by Dr Irving Finkel, which by September 2021 had collected more than 15,000 unpublished diaries.

== London history ==
Bishopsgate Library holds collections relating to the social and cultural history of London. These include the archive collections of individuals, such as historian Raphael Samuel, police officer Frederick Wensley or Lord Mayor Sir Ralph Perring, and organisations, such as the London History Workshop or the Eton Manor Boys' Club.

The library also holds a collection of around 50,000 books, pamphlets, illustrations, photographs and maps covering the social and cultural history of London, with particular reference to Bishopsgate and Spitalfields. The London Collection also holds an extensive collection of press cuttings concerning the area around the Institute dating from 1740 and one of the country's finest collections of London guidebooks and trade directories.

Information on the institute's own history is detailed within the Bishopsgate Institute archive, along with the archives of prominent individuals connected to the organisation, including social reformer William Rogers (1819-1896), librarian Charles Goss and architect Charles Harrison Townsend.

== LGBTQIA+ history ==
The library has recently developed to become Britain's largest LGBTQIA+ archive. Holding more than 12,000 titles and a pamphlet collection of over 3,500 festival programmes, event leaflets and campaign material. Notable parts of the collection include extensive erotica, the Rebel Dykes archive project, the UK Leather and Fetish Archives and the Museum of Transology. Since 2011 the Lesbian and Gay Newsmedia Archive (LAGNA), part of the Hall–Carpenter Archives has been based at Bishopsgate. The library hosts outreach events, encourages donations of people's LGBTQIA+ artefacts and host open days showcasing collections. In March 2022 the Bishopsgate Institute showcased many artefacts from the collection at the Barbican Centre gallery The Curve in an exhibition called Out and About!.

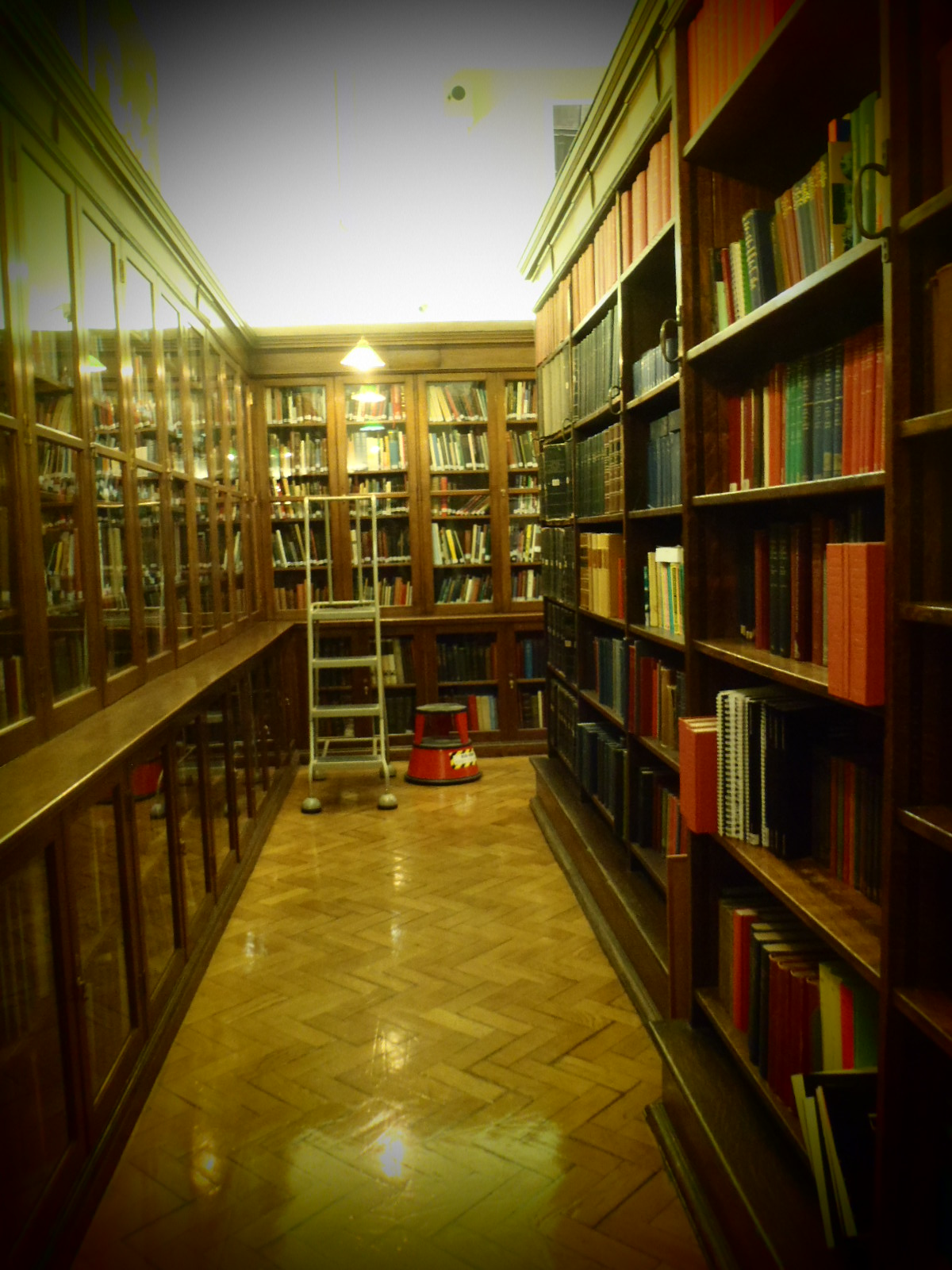
Part of Bishopsgate Library

== Labour and socialist history ==
Bishopsgate Library's collections on labour and socialist history include the archives of politicians and activists such as Jack Gaster, Noreen Branson, Aubrey Bowman and Bernie Grant, as well as organisations such as the Evening Standard Outside Chapel and the National Miners' Support Network.

The Labour and Socialist History collections also include the library and archive of politician and trade unionist George Howell (1833–1910).

The archives have held inspiration for many, including architect Sumayya Vally whose 2021 Serpentine Pavilion was inspired by her time at the Bishopsgate looking at their archives of collective activist history.

== Freethought and humanism ==
Bishopsgate Library holds the most unusual collection of archives and printed materials relating to the history of freethought and humanism in the UK. This includes the archives and libraries of two of the Victorian era's most prominent thinkers on freethought and secularism, Charles Bradlaugh and George Jacob Holyoake.

The library also documents the history, activities and campaigns of the movement from the late 19th century to the present day through the extensive archives of the British Humanist Association, Rationalist Association and the Gay and Lesbian Humanist Association.

== Co-operation ==
Bishopsgate Library has extensive collections documenting the history and activities of the co-operative movement in London, Essex and the South East, including the archives of individual activists such as Robert Leckie Marshall (1913-2008) and Caroline Ganley, and organisations such as the London Co-operative Society and the Women's Co-operative Guild.

The Co-operative Movement Collection includes a wide range of books, pamphlets, reports and journals concerning the history of the movement, alongside material produced by a wide variety of organisations, such as the Co-operative Party, International Co-operative Alliance and Women's Co-operative Guild.

== Protest and campaigning ==
Collections relating to the history of protest and campaigning includes the archives of individual activists such as Mavis Middleton and Peter Hunot, and organisations such as the Stop the War Coalition, Freedom Press and Republic.

The Library's archives and printed material also cover a wide variety of topics including republicanism, pacifism, the anti-nuclear movement, colonial freedom movements, anarchism, animal rights and conscientious objection.

== In the media ==
The library has served as a filming location, with scenes from My Policeman filmed there. The Log Books, an award-winning podcast about the history of the LGBTQ+ helpline Switchboard, uses material from the Switchboard archives at the Bishopsgate Institute to tell stories of the volunteers who have staffed the helpline since 1974. In January 2026, podcast hosts Adam Zmith and Tash Walker published The Log Books: Voices of Queer Britain and the Helpline that Listened, using the Bishopsgate Archives as key source material.
