= Uncertain States =

British lens-based artists project

Uncertain States (UCS) is a British lens-based artists' project that publishes and distributes a free quarterly broadsheet newspaper. UCS, founded in 2009 by Fiona Yaron-Field, David George and Spencer Rowell, also hold group photography exhibitions.

Uncertain States is distributed free of charge at UK art galleries and museums including the Turner Contemporary, Tate Britain, Victoria and Albert Museum, Baltic Centre for Contemporary Art, Ikon Gallery, and Open Eye Gallery.

In 2016 UCS inspired the formation of a similar Scandinavian project, Uncertain States Scandinavia.

== Exhibitions ==
- The Bank Gallery, November 2014. Including work by Cat Steven, Richard Sawdon-Smith, Radoslav Daskalov, David George, Ania Dabrowska, Karl Ohiri, Fiona Yaron-Field and Richard Ansett.
- Four Corners Gallery, October 2015. Including work by Julia Fullerton-Batten, Zoe Childerley, Jolanta Dolewska, Nigel Grimmer, Flore Gardner, David Severn, Rosy Martin, Simon Brann Thorpe and Karolina Lebek.
- Mile End Arts Pavilion, November 2016. Including work by Sarah Amy Fishlock.
- Safehouse 1 as part of Peckham 24, May 2017. Curated by Zelda Cheatle, including work by Mark Aitken, David George, Jonty Sale, and Fiona Yaron-Field.
- Photofusion Photography Centre, March 2019.
