= Sue Darlow =

Sue Darlow (1960-2011) was a photographer who worked in the United Kingdom and India. Darlow's work highlighted the lives of the poorer women of India, documented the Parsi people of western India, particularly in Bombay and Gujarat, and celebrated cycle culture.

== Career ==
Darlow was a member of the Format Women's Photography co-operative from the mid 1980s, after she graduated from the West Surrey College of Art & Design. Her images of women's lives were published primarily by left-leaning journals in the United Kingdom (including New Internationalist, The Times Literary Supplement and The Economist) and in India. Her images of cycling by New Cyclist, Encyclopaedia and Cyclorama amongst others. Her last major project was to document the Parsi subculture of western India.

== Personal life ==
Darlow was born in Bombay, India in 1960, and lived there until moving with her mother, to Oxford, England at the age of 13. Darlow returned to India to photograph several times after her graduation, including one journey overland by bicycle. She spent some time working at the offices of Manushi, an organisation highlighting women's issues in Delhi.

Darlow married and moved to Modena, Italy, raising a daughter there and documenting the bike culture of that city as well as publishing recipes. - Indian cookery was another area she took much delight in.

Darlow died from cancer in 2011, just short of her 51st birthday, returning to the UK to spend her last days at a Christian Science hospice.
