= London Jewish Cultural Centre =

Former British charity organisation

- Type: Jewish educational charity
- Location: North End Road, Golders Green, London, United Kingdom
- Key people: Raymond Simonson, Chief Executive
- Website: www.ljcc.org.uk

The London Jewish Cultural Centre (LJCC; formerly the Spiro Institute) was a charitable organisation based (from 2005) at Ivy House, the former home of prima ballerina Anna Pavlova, in North End Road, Golders Green, London. It provided an educational programme of courses, events and leisure activities. In November 2014 it was announced that the London Jewish Cultural Centre would merge with JW3, the Jewish Community Centre London. JW3 and LJCC merged in March 2015, forming a single, enhanced organisation. The merged organisation runs a variety of events from the JW3 site on Finchley Road, London.

== History ==
The LJCC was previously known as the Spiro Institute. The Spiro Institute was created by Robin Spiro and his wife Nitza, who was its Executive Director from 1983 to 1998.

== Organisation ==
Louise Jacobs succeeded Trudy Gold as Chief Executive in 2011 and remained so until 31 January 2015, when she stepped down to be succeeded by Raymond Simonson, Chief Executive of JW3. Michael Marx was Chairman.

== Holocaust education ==
LJCC's Holocaust and Anti-Racism Education Department sought to fight prejudice and bigotry through education and to emphasise the relevance of the Holocaust for humanity as a whole. It ran educational programmes in the UK, and – under the auspices of the International Task Force for Holocaust Education – in Eastern Europe and in China. The department also advised many organisations, including the BBC, on issues related to the Holocaust and racism.

In January 2011, with the backing of Michael Gove, who was then Secretary of State for Education, the LJCC launched The Holocaust Explained, an education website for secondary school children.

== Art ==
The Centre held 97 paintings by the artist Yonia Fain (born 1913).
