= An Dekker =

- Born: 1931; Netherlands
- Died: September 2012 (aged 80–81); Prayssac, France
- Known for: Sculpture, graphic design
- Movement: Modern sculpture
- Partner: Ankie Peypers

An Dekker (1931 – September 2012) was a Dutch sculptor, graphic designer, publisher and feminist. Her abstract works of sculpture heavily featured the dynamics of war, peace, and human relationships.

== Biography ==
Dekker was born in the Kingdom of the Netherlands in 1931. Her family was involved with the Dutch communist community, and as such fled the country when the Netherlands was invaded and occupied by Nazi Germany in 1940. Interested in sculpture from a young age, Dekker was educated at the Dutch Academy of Fine Arts, where she studied in the 1950s. She then moved to Paris to further her art career; while in France, she worked in the studio of prominent sculptor Ossip Zadkine. She held her first exhibition in Nîmes in 1953.

In 1957, Dekker moved with her husband (a food chemist) to Nigeria; she would live and work there until 1971, and the nation's unique artistic tradition impacted Dekker's perception of art. While in Nigeria, her husband was killed in an accident. Dekker remarried, but this marriage ended in a separation.

Dekker moved to London in 1972. While living in the United Kingdom, Dekker joined the socialist-feminist Hackney Flashers and became a part of the burgeoning Women's liberation movement. During the period between her arrival and the mid-1980s, Dekker worked as a graphic designer during this time, and co-founded a collective of female graphic designers. She returned to her native Netherlands in the mid-1980s, where she founded a publishing house in Amsterdam. She and her partner (Ankie Peypers, a Dutch poet) moved to France in the early 1990s. In 1997, Dekker returned to sculpting, a trade which she continued in until her death in 2003.

An Dekker had three daughters, Pyrrol and Titi (Titilola), both of whom died before her own death, and Ninon. She also had a son Tomi.
