= Rebel Dykes =

2021 British film

- Directed by: Siân A Williams; Harri Shanahan
- Production company: Riot Productions
- Release date: 2021
- Running time: 89 minutes
- Country: United Kingdom
- Language: English

Rebel Dykes is a 2021 documentary film directed by Siân A. Williams and Harri Shanahan about the lesbian scene in London during the 1980s and 1990s.

In 2021 the film won the Iris Prize Best Feature Award, the Best Documentary Award at Pornfilmfestival Berlin, a Special Jury Mention at the KASHISH Mumbai International Queer Film Festival, and was nominated for The Raindance Discovery Award at the British Independent Film Awards and the Best Feature Film Award at the Scottish BAFTA.

Siobhan Fahey set up Riot Productions to produce Rebel Dykes.

== Synopsis ==
The film is a documentary, the narrative told by the cast, with archive footage, images and animation (the latter created by Harri Shanahan).

The history covers some of the cast's experiences at the Greenham Common Women's Peace Camp, the S&M club Chain Reaction, protests against the introduction of Section 28 including the lesbian invasion on the BBC, abseilers into the House of Lords and the impact of AIDS on the LGBTQ+ community as well as the homophobia of the era. It goes on to follow the women into their current lives, some living on women's communes, still performing drag cabaret at the Royal Vauxhall Tavern and covering a recent reminiscence gathering event at DIY Space For London.

The film also has a prominent soundtrack, with bands such as Poison Girls, The Brendas, The Sleeze Sisters, Sluts from Outer Space, Amy and the angels, Mouth Almighty, The Petticoats, Sister George, Well Oiled Sisters and the Gymslips being mentioned and their music included to narrate the story.

== Cast ==
- Del LaGrace Volcano
- Debbie Smith
- Lisa Power
- Roz Kaveney

== Reception ==
The film received a 100% rating at Rotten Tomatoes based on 12 reviews, as of 04 Nov 2024.

== Rebel Dykes History Project ==
Aside from the film, the Rebel Dykes History Project has been a longer project made up of oral histories, art exhibitions, other short films and more.

Alongside the film release, the Rebel Dykes Art & Archive Show exhibition was held at Space Station Sixty-Five gallery in Kennington, south London in 2021. It was curated by Atalanta Kernick, with Kat Hudson from Lesley Magazine.

The Rebel Dykes Archive is held at the Bishopsgate Library at Bishopsgate Institute, London.

The first International Rebel Dykes Day was held on 29 January 2026, marking the date of the first Chain Reaction club night that was first held in 29 January 1987. Siobhan Fahey, the director of Rebel Dykes credited the S&M club night as giving the dykes a place to gather and form a community.
