= Roz Kaveney =

British writer, critic, and poet (born 1949)

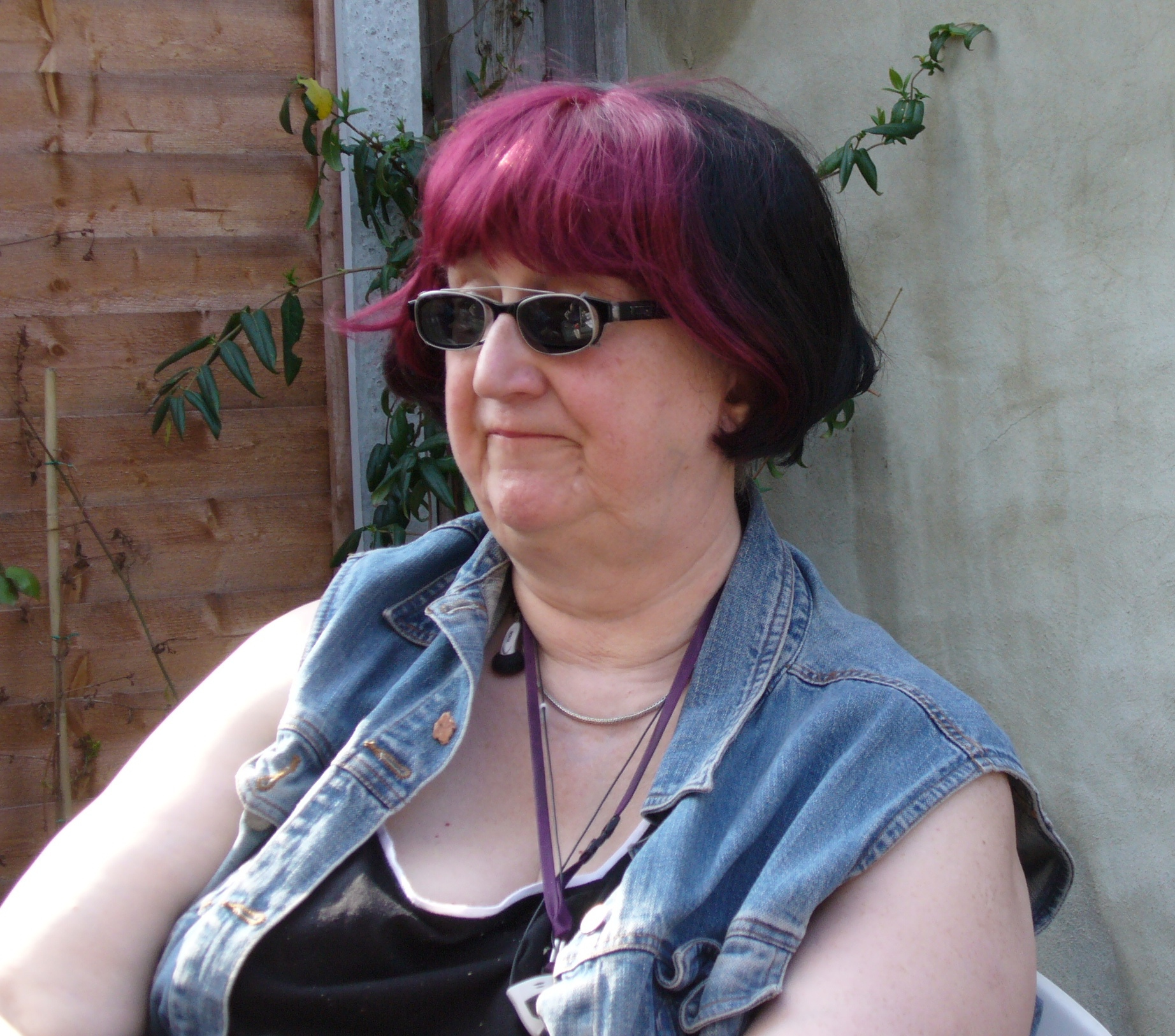
- Kaveney in 2007
- Born: 9 July 1949 (age 77)
- Occupations: Writer and editor
- Website: glamourousrags.dymphna.net

Roz Kaveney (born 9 July 1949) is a British writer, critic, and poet, best known for her critical works about pop culture and for being a core member of the Midnight Rose collective. Kaveney's works include fiction and non-fiction, poetry, reviewing, and editing. Kaveney is also a civil liberties and transgender rights activist. She has contributed to several newspapers such as The Independent and The Guardian. She is also a founding member of Feminists Against Censorship and a former deputy chair of Liberty. She was an editor of the transgender-related magazine META.

== Early life and transition ==
Kaveney attended Pembroke College, Oxford, where she participated in a poetry group that had a particular interest in Martian poetry, and shared a flat with Christopher Reid. Kaveney is a transgender woman, who began transition in her last year at Oxford.

In the early 1970s, Kaveney was part of the Gay Liberation Front's Transvestite, Transsexual and Drag Queen Group. Along with several other individuals, including Rachel Pollack, she contributed to the 1972 essay "Don't call me mister, you fucking beast", which has been described as Britain's "first trans manifesto". This was published alongside other works in the second women's issue of Come Together, the newspaper of the Gay Liberation Front.

After being "persuaded to desist by feminist friends", Kaveney delayed her transition for several years. She eventually transitioned around 1978. In 1980, she helped campaign for Linda Gold, a transgender woman, to receive oestrogen while incarcerated in a male prison.

== Cultural criticism ==
Since the late 1970s Kaveney has been a prolific cultural critic. She has written reviews and essays for numerous publications, including science fiction and fantasy periodicals such as Vector and Foundation, and The Times Literary Supplement. Kaveney is also known for editing books which contain a range of essays about popular films and television shows, including Buffy the Vampire Slayer and Battlestar Galactica.

== Literary career ==
Kaveney's first novel, Tiny Pieces of Skull, was published in 2015 by Team Angelica Press, 27 years after she originally wrote it in the 1980s. The story follows trans protagonist Annabelle Jones, who travels from London to the United States in 1978 to join a friend, only to find herself isolated in Chicago. An early draft was read by Neil Gaiman, who wrote in 2016 that he "was saddened and horrified that publishers wouldn’t publish it".

In a review for The Times Literary Supplement, Lucy Popescu describes Tiny Pieces of Skull as a work which "deserves to be recognised as a seminal fictional work on transgender identity and transphobia ... hilarious and chilling". It won the 2016 Lambda Literary Award for Transgender Fiction.

From 1982-1984 Kaveney was an editor for the British fantasy and science fiction magazine Interzone. She later edited the short story collections Tales From the Forbidden Planet (1987) and More Tales From the Forbidden Planet (1990), which featured contributions from authors including Iain Banks, Gwyneth Jones, Michael Moorcock, Larry Niven, Rachel Pollack, and Terry Pratchett.

As part of the Midnight Rose collective, Kaveney wrote various short stories for the group's series of shared world anthologies through the 1990s, and (with Mary Gentle) co-edited The Weerde Book 1 and Book 2, plus Villains!.

In 2012 Rituals was published, the first of five novels in Kaveney's fantasy series Rhapsody of Blood. It was short-listed for the Crawford Award, and made the Honor Roll for the Tiptree Award.

== Poetry ==
Kaveney gave up poetry in her twenties, not resuming until reaching 50. Kaveney's poetry was originally written in a rhythmic free verse, although her work later shifted into formalism. Kaveney cites a number of bereavements as the trigger for returning to poetry. Speaking to PinkNews, she said: "When my friend Mike Ford died, suddenly and tragically, I organised a memorial meeting for him and wrote a poem for it completely out of the blue.”

In 2012, Kaveney's first two poetry collections were published by A Midsummer Night's Press. What If What's Imagined Were All True is a book of poems with science fiction, fantasy, and mythological themes. Dialectic of the Flesh collects Kaveney's poetry about queerness, trans experience, and the body, and was a finalist for the Lambda Literary Award for Transgender Fiction.

In 2018 Sad Press published Catullus, Kaveney's translation and reimagination of the Latin works of Roman poet Gaius Valerius Catullus. Reviewing Catullus for Tears in the Fence, Antony John praises Kaveney's "very rude translations" of Catullus' "very rude poems". In the Bryn Mawr Classical Review, Tori Lee argues that Kaveney "upends traditional understanding of what Catullus—in all his aggression, obscenity, and sexuality—represents", and describes the collection as a "light, readable, enormously fun Catullus that will delight classicists and non-classicists alike".

== Other work ==
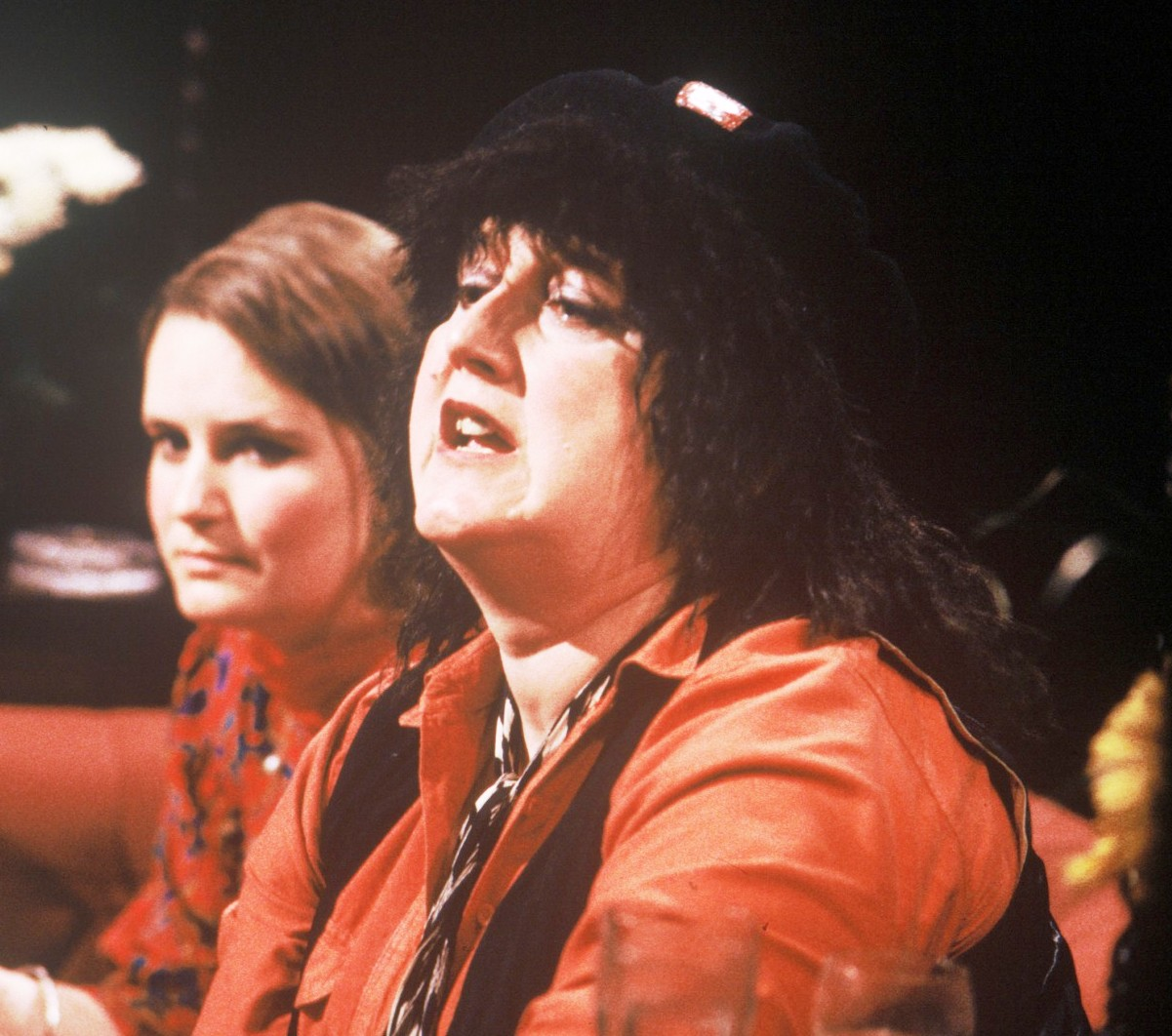
Appearing on television discussion programme After Dark in 1988

In 1988, Kaveney made an extended appearance on the television discussion After Dark with among others Andrea Dworkin and Anthony Burgess. Kaveney wrote later:

I met Burgess when I did an After Dark with him and Andrea Dworkin, and it remains worth saying that he was so dreadful that Dworkin and I formed an alliance against him.

In 2021 Kaveney appeared in the documentary Rebel Dykes, which explores the history of a radical lesbian subculture in 1980s London, England.

== Creative influences ==
Kaveney has cited Marilyn Hacker, Thomas M. Disch, and Samuel R. Delany among her literary influences.

== Bibliography ==
=== Novels ===
- Tiny Pieces of Skull (2015). London: Team Angelica. ISBN 978-0956971975.

==== Rhapsody of Blood ====
- Rituals, Rhapsody of Blood, Volume One (2012). San Francisco: Plus One Press. ISBN 978-0984436279.
- Reflections, Rhapsody of Blood Volume Two (2013). San Francisco: Plus One Press. ISBN 978-0986008573.
- Resurrections, Rhapsody of Blood Volume Three (2014). San Francisco: Plus One Press. ISBN 978-0986008597.
- Realities, Rhapsody of Blood Volume Four (2018). San Francisco: Plus One Press. ISBN 978-0997745313.
- Revelations, Rhapsody of Blood Volume Five (2023). San Francisco: Plus One Press. ISBN 978-0997745320.

=== Poetry anthologies ===
- Dialectic of the Flesh (2012). Dover, Florida: A Midsummer Night's Press.
- What If What's Imagined Were All True (2012). Dover, Florida: A Midsummer Night's Press.
- Catullus (2018). Bristol: Sad Press.
- Selected Poems: 2009-2021 (2021). London: Team Angelica.
- The Great Good Time (2022). London: Team Angelica.

=== Short stories ===
- "A Lonely Impulse" (1991).
- "A Wolf to Man" (1992).
- "Bellringers' Overtime" (1992).
- "The Lady and/or the Tiger" (1992). With Neil Gaiman.
- "Totally Trashed" (1992).
- "Raised Voices in a Reading Room" (1993).
- "Ignorance of Perfect Reason" (1993).
- "Brandy for the Damned" (1997).
- "Instructions" (1998).
- "A Shamble of Zombies" (2012).

=== Edited anthologies ===
- Tales from the Forbidden Planet (1987). London: Titan Books.
- More Tales from the Forbidden Planet (1990). London: Titan Books.
- Villains! (1992). New York: Roc Books. With Mary Gentle.
- The Weerde: Book 1 (1992). New York: Roc Books. With Mary Gentle.
- The Weerde: Book 2 (1993). New York: Roc Books. With Mary Gentle.

=== Edited non-fiction ===
- Reading the Vampire Slayer - The New, Updated Unofficial Guide to Buffy and Angel (2001). London: Tauris Parke Paperbacks.
- From Alien to the Matrix: Reading Science Fiction Film (2005). London: I.B. Tauris.
- Superheroes!: Capes and Crusaders in Comics and Films (2006). London: I.B. Tauris.
- Teen Dreams: Reading Teen Film and Television from 'Heathers' to 'Veronica Mars' (2006). London: I.B. Tauris.
- Battlestar Galactica: Investigating Flesh, Spirit, and Steel (2010). London: I.B. Tauris. With Jennifer Stoy.
- Nip/Tuck: Television That Gets Under Your Skin (2011). London: I.B. Tauris. With Jennifer Stoy.

=== Other published work ===
- Introduction to Scratch Monkey by Charles Stross (1993, introduction 2011). Burton, Michigan: Subterranean Press.
