= Format (photographic agency) =

British agency representing women photographers (1983–2003)

- Formation: 1983
- Dissolved: 2003; 23 years ago
- Type: Photographic agency
- Purpose: To represent women photographers
- Products: Photojournalism
- Key people: Maggie Murray and Val Wilmer

Format was an agency set up in 1983 to represent women photographers, with the aim of documenting the world from a different perspective. The agency operated for two decades, and its end, in 2003, was marked by an exhibition. In 2010, the National Portrait Gallery, London, showed a range of work by Format photographers.

The idea of an all-women photo agency was the conception of Maggie Murray and Val Wilmer, and Format's membership over the years also included Jackie Chapman, Anita Corbin, Sue Darlow, Melanie Friend, Sheila Gray, Paula Glassman, Judy Harrison, Pam Isherwood, Roshini Kempadoo, Jenny Matthews, Joanne O'Brien, Raissa Page, Brenda Prince, Ulrike Preuss, Miriam Reik, Karen Robinson, Paula Solloway, Mo Wilson and Lisa Woollett.

An archive of Format's papers and photographs is held at Bishopsgate Institute, London.

== Exhibitions ==
- Format Photography Agency 1983 – 2003, National Portrait Gallery, London, January–August 2010
