= Camerawork (magazine) =

British bi-monthly photography periodical 1976-1985

- Editor: Jo Spence
- Editor: Terry Dennett
- Frequency: bi-monthly
- Format: A2>A4 folding broadsheet
- Publisher: Half Moon Photography Workshop
- Founded: 1976
- Final issue Number: no. 32, summer 1985
- Country: United Kingdom
- Based in: London
- Language: English
- ISSN: 0308-1672
- OCLC: 480398473

Camerawork (1976–1985) was a British bi-monthly photography magazine promoting humanist, socialist and activist photography. It was based in London.

== History ==
Half Moon Photography Workshop, a collective of photographers, initiated community photography education, Half Moon Gallery and publishing activities in the East End in the early 1970s, and out of this grew the magazine Camerawork, from which the collective then took its name, established in 1976 by Jo Spence with the socialist historian of photography Terry Dennett.

They were joined on the cooperative editorial team for the first edition (February 1976), themed 'The Politics of Photography', by Tony Bock, Roger Eaton, Mike Goldwater, Janet Goldberg, Marilyn Noad, Tom Picton, George Solomonides, and Paul Trevor, with writings by Terry Dennett, Tom Picton, Jo Spence, and Paul Trevor and pictures by Nick Hedges, Ron McCormick, Larry Herman, Chris Searle, Exit, Helmut Newton, and Claire Schwob. Subsequent editions were also themed, with often controversial topics.

The group moved to a new gallery also named Camerawork, on Roman Road in 1977 – a space now used by arts charity Four Corners.

== Origins ==
Coming out of the 1960s protests and Marxism, documentary photography in the 1970s, Camerawork's humanist, leftist stance and preference for politically 'committed' or 'activist' photography was established in editorials like that from its 13th issue:

Photographers since Lewis Hine and Jacob Riis have shown the things in our society that need to be changed. People have done community work since the great charitable settlements were established in our big cities during the last century. Community photographers, however, want to give more than charity or expose social injustice. They believe that people can use photography to make their own demands and help to make them free.

The magazine promoted several photographer collectives; the Hackney Flashers, Union Place and the Exit Group of Chris Steele-Perkins, Nicholas Battye and Paul Trevor.

The magazine folded in 1985, with no. 32, summer 1985.

== Legacy ==
The Camerawork archives are held by Four Corners, the Photography and the Archive Research Centre (PARC) at the University of the Arts London (UAL) and The Bishopsgate Institute.

Four Corners Digital Archive makes all copies of Camerawork available to view online as well as resources covering Four Corners and Half Moon Photography Workshop (later Camerawork) for the period 1972 to 1987: oral histories, film and audio archive, and more than 3000 examples selected from exhibitions, posters, press releases and ephemera.
