= Rhapsody of Blood =

2012 novel by Roz Kaveney

Rituals: Rhapsody of Blood
- Author: Roz Kaveney
- Language: English
- Genre: Fantasy novel
- Publisher: Plus One Press
- Publication date: 2012
- Publication place: United Kingdom
- Media type: Print (Paperback)
- Pages: 334 pp
- ISBN: 0984436278

Rituals: Rhapsody of Blood is a 2012 fantasy novel by Roz Kaveney, released by Plus One Press. The book is the first entry in a four-part series, with the second entry expected to release in 2013. Of the novel, Kaveney stated that the book was "my way of exploring how it would be not to make all the compromises I actually made in the 90s".

== Plot summary ==
Mara the Huntress, a goddess who has at various times inspired the legend of Artemis and other warrior goddesses, is dedicated to destroying anyone who uses the "Rituals of Blood" to become a god by mass murder. The first volume of the novel describes some of her adventures in different eras, as related to Alistair Crowley, and the adventures of Emma, a survivor of one of the rituals Mara has disrupted, accompanied by her ghostly lover Caroline.

== Reception ==
Reception for the book was mostly positive, gaining positive reviews from Strange Horizons and Tor.com.
