= Val Wilmer =

British photographer and writer (born 1941)

- Born: Valerie Sybil Wilmer; 7 December 1941 (age 84); Harrogate, Yorkshire, England
- Occupations: Photographer; writer
- Relatives: Clive Wilmer (brother)
- Writing career
- Period: 1959–present
- Subjects: Jazz; Gospel; Blues; British African-Caribbean music and culture
- Notable works: Jazz People (1970); The Face of Black Music (1976); As Serious As Your Life (1977)

Valerie Sybil Wilmer (born 7 December 1941) is a British photographer and writer specialising in jazz, gospel, blues, and British African-Caribbean music and culture. Her notable books include Jazz People (1970) and As Serious As Your Life (1977), both first published by Allison and Busby. Wilmer's autobiography, Mama Said There'd Be Days Like This: My Life in the Jazz World, was published in 1989.

== Early life ==
Val Wilmer was born on 7 December 1941 in Harrogate, Yorkshire, England, where her family had been evacuated from London because of the outbreak of World War II. She is the sister of the poet and writer Clive Wilmer (1945–2025). As soon as the war was over, her family returned to living in London.

She began her life in the jazz world by listening to prewar recordings of jazz classics, being led to many important recordings through Rudi Blesh's Shining Trumpets, a history of jazz, and Jazz by Rex Harris. Wilmer became entranced by recordings by Bessie Smith ("Empty Bed Blues") and the singing of Fats Waller – going to the Swing Shop in Streatham, south London, at the age of 12, combing through the jazz records until she found something she wanted to hear.

Three years after these explorations in sound, Wilmer began writing about Black music, encouraged and inspired by Max Jones, Paul Oliver and others. She attended concerts accompanied by her mother, who believed her too young to go on her own. Wilmer states that it was a “tribute to [her] mother's tolerance" being allowed to explore her interests so freely, especially during a time when little girls were often informed of the limitations of their own future options: "Little girls, we are often told, want to grow up to be ballet dancers ... I don’t think it ever crossed my mind to consider the usual female options, resolutely opposed as I was to anything that smacked of feminine pursuits and did not involve going places, being and doing."

== Writing career ==
Aware of the earliest records of jazz and blues, Wilmer began to write about jazz and other African-American music, focusing on the political and social messages of the music. Her first article (a biography of Jesse Fuller) appeared in Jazz Journal in May 1959 when she was still only 17. Reflecting on how this piece originated, Wilmer states: "I was an inveterate letter writer, that's how the break with Jesse Fuller came about, me writing to him out of the blue. Woe betide any American musician who was foolish enough to have a contact address published somewhere — I'd find it and fire off a letter. The amazing thing was really, I mean really, that so many would reply! These great musicians and characters from a black culture on the other side of the world writing back to this young suburban white girl in England."

Fundamental to Wilmer's work is her keen understanding and insightful expression of the disparity between male and female music writers. Entering this world in 1959, she understood that writing about music was “something that men did. There was a penalty to pay for being a woman in a man’s world…[and] for a white woman to be concerned with something that Black people did meant to experience additional pressure." Through African-American music Wilmer was able to immerse herself in realities that would have stayed undiscovered had she remained within the margins of her comfort-zone. For her, these experiences were fundamental and life-changing. Her perseverance in this difficult sphere and her devotion to the music led her to a path of self-discovery and personal growth, and the understanding of "the potential for personal change that exists in us all." Through her writing about music, Wilmer was able to provide a voice to a transatlantic, multicultural, and multiracial dialogue, delving into a "part of history, or [what] might very soon be."

Since 1959, she has interviewed hundreds of musicians, written previews and criticism. Her work has been cited and used in research for many books, articles and films, including several biographies of major musicians. Her early interviews with Earle Warren, Lee Young, and Paul "Polo" Barnes are cited in Douglas Henry Daniels's biography of Lester Young. Interviews with Thelonious Monk, Nellie Monk and Billy Higgins are cited in Robin D. G. Kelley's biography of Thelonious Monk. Other examples of the use of Wilmer's early interviews include "Texas Trombone: Henry Coker" in Dave Oliphant's books Texan Jazz and Jazz Mavericks of the Lone Star State.

She was later to gain recognition for her interviews of saxophonists Joe Harriott and Ornette Coleman, and become a writer, music critic and photographer. Writing in 1965 of the changes in Monk's style, she says: "For the last 10 years or so, Monk's music has become easier to listen to, though it is not necessarily any simpler. What he is doing is as engaging and profound as ever, though seeming to be less provocative than when he was upsetting rules."

Her essays and obituaries are notable for their ability to subtly reveal the underlying inequities that Black artists and women faced in the music industry, often using their own words. In a 15 July 1960 obituary in Jazz News, Wilmer quotes Memphis Slim: "I also wanted to get my own publishing company, but the record men don't want to hire a guy who's got his own publishing company," revealing the difficulty he faced as a black artist. Speaking of her friendship with the influential lyricist, music critic, interviewer and singer Kitty Grime, Wilmer demonstrates her love, respect and admiration, while also revealing the masculine bias in the world of music: "It was during this heady period that we met, at a time when the jazz scene was virtually an all-male preserve...her awareness and knowledgeability were something that most younger commentators would be hard put to emulate".

In her writing, she continuously keeps jazz history at the forefront, and presents herself as a devout listener, admirer and lover of music. Nevertheless, she admits to having interviewed the brothers Albert Ayler and Donald Ayler as a journalistic exercise and not a fan, yet eventually she "would come to admire Albert Ayler as the last major jazz visionary".

Although Wilmer's forte is jazz and blues, she is versed in the larger movements in music history and reveals her versatility across genres when, for instance, she writes about how Jimi Hendrix's visit to England in 1966 gave "the floundering local scene a much-needed injection".

Wilmer has been a contributor to a vast array of publications, including Melody Maker, DownBeat (she was its UK correspondent, 1966–1970), Jazz Journal, Musics, Double Bassist, Mojo, Jazzwise, The Wire, and regularly contributes obituaries of musicians to The Guardian.

=== Jazz People (1970) ===
Wilmer's first book, Jazz People, was one of the first books published by Margaret Busby at Allison & Busby in 1970 and is now often referred to as one of the "three or four finest books ever written on jazz" (subsequently issued in the US by Da Capo Press). It features interviews with American musicians who include Eddie "Lockjaw" Davis, Art Farmer, Babs Gonzales, Jimmy Heath, Billy Higgins, Thelonious Monk, Archie Shepp, Cecil Taylor, Clark Terry, Big Joe Turner and Randy Weston, and as Kirkus Reviews noted: "The emphasis is on the people in these fourteen interviews, the personalities behind the jazz, their moods, ambitions, influences....The author observes well and the profiles are short and sharp with high notes for the buff."

=== The Face of Black Music (1976) ===
Rated "as important a photographer as she is a writer", Wilmer is the author of the photograph-led The Face of Black Music (Da Capo Press, 1976), which like Jazz People is considered a canonical and influential text in music criticism.

=== As Serious As Your Life (1977) ===
Wilmer's book As Serious as Your Life: The Story of the New Jazz, first published in 1977 by Allison and Busby, is considered by some a classic of jazz, writing though not beyond some criticism; its title references something said to Wilmer by McCoy Tyner: "Music's not a plaything; it's as serious as your life." One of the first accounts of the revolutionary "free jazz" and its practitioners, it also documents women's experiences in relation to the "new jazz" in African-American communities, and deviates from the "masculinist rule of exclusion". Presenting sexual politics in the world of jazz, Wilmer unearthed sexual politics in music criticism itself. In her work, she presents a "superb descriptive journey that moves the reader through a number of seemingly incommensurable communities simultaneously.... This is the vision and possibility of community when the struggle toward freedom recognizes the intersections of sexual difference, gender, and sexuality in addition to race and class, as the basis for improvisational practices".

As Serious As Your Life was reprinted by Serpent's Tail in 2018 (endorsed on the cover by Nat Hentoff as "An exceptionally illuminating book on jazz"), with the subtitle: "Black Music And The Free-Jazz Revolution, 1957–1977". Michael J. Agovino wrote in The Village Voice: "During the 1960s and '70s 'counterculture', much of which became a massive cash register, Val Wilmer fixed her strobe lights onto a musical and political landscape that really did in fact run counter to the culture. A shame so few — blacks and whites — were paying attention at the time. But her book, and the work it documented, remains as serious, and necessary, as ever."

The name of the music production company Serious, established in the mid-1980s and organizers of the annual London Jazz Festival, is partly inspired by Wilmer's book, according to founder John Cumming: "I recommend that book to anybody interested in the evolution of jazz in the late 20th century. ...that was a book that really made me think. It was a mixture of Val's book, and also that in the eighties 'serious' had become a piece of contemporary slang. People used to come up and say, 'That's a really serious piece of work.'"

=== Mama Said There'd Be Days Like This (1989) ===
Wilmer's autobiography, Mama Said There'd Be Days Like This: My Life in the Jazz World (Women's Press, 1989), details her development as an artist/journalist, and includes her coming out as a lesbian in a largely heterosexist musical milieu. Robyn Archer wrote in the Feminist Review: "With this book Val has made the courageous decision to tell it like it was. The result is a social history of music like no other, and a no-nonsense account of the development from birth to maturity of a dynamic woman whose documentary arts deserve to be reappraised as a whole in the light of this book." A 2016 review On The Neglected Books Page stated: "Mama Said There'd Be Days Like This is really much more than a book about music, though it's exceptional on that level. But Wilmer's life is something of a distillation of much that was of importance in the 1960s and 1970s. The growing recognition of race as a political factor, of the rise of civil rights. The increasing influence of American culture in British life. The changing British economy (Wilmer collaborated on a never-published oral history of coal mining). And the sexual revolution."

== Other documentation and archival projects ==
Wilmer has written biographical articles on Black British musicians from the 1940s and 1950s, and articles about photography. She was a member of the advisory board for The New Grove Dictionary of Jazz (2nd edition, 2002), edited by Barry Kernfeld, and the author of 63 entries. Wilmer provided the foreword to John Gray's Fire Music: A Bibliography of the New Jazz, 1959–1990. She has written more than 35 articles for the Oxford Dictionary of National Biography. The British Library Sound Archive contains 35 of Wilmer's interviews with black British musicians and women musicians in its Oral History of Jazz in Britain.

Wilmer has amassed a collection of historic photos of black people in Britain, some of which have been on public display (including in Autograph ABP's 2014 exhibition Black Chronicles II at Rivington Place), and she is working on a project to research the lives of black British musicians, which she has been documenting for many years.

== Photography ==
Wilmer is as important a photographer as she is a writer, having worked with hundreds of singers, jazz musicians and writers, and she has taken noted photographs of artists such as Langston Hughes, Louis Armstrong, John Coltrane, and Duke Ellington. Her photographs were exhibited at the Victoria and Albert Museum (V&A) in the 1973 exhibition Jazz Seen: The Face of Black Music, and form part of the V&A's photographic collection. Her photographs are also held in the National Portrait Gallery collection.

She has written about photography and interviewed practitioners including Eve Arnold, Anthony Barboza, Roy DeCarava, Terry Cryer, Milt Hinton, John Hopkins, Danny Lyon, Raissa Page (of Greenham Common fame), Coreen Simpson, Beuford Smith and James Van Der Zee. In the 1980s, Wilmer compiled and edited the "Evidence" issue of Ten.8 magazine devoted to the work of African-American photographers. Wilmer's work has often been used in conjunction with music albums, as in the digipak booklet for Honest Jon's London is the Place for Me no. 4 CD, which includes photographs by her that "are full of warmth and immediacy".

With Maggie Murray, Wilmer founded Format, the first all-women photographers' agency in Britain, in 1983.

In September 2013, while Ronnie Scott's Jazz Club in Frith Street, Soho, was undergoing redecoration, a twelve-square-metre (130 sq ft) hoarding was erected on the façade with a tribute to its eponymous founder in the form of a massive photograph by Wilmer of him smoking a cigarette outside the club, and one of his legendary one-liners: "I love this place, it's just like home, filthy and full of strangers."

Wilmer's work was featured in the Esquire Cover Club, the London Jazz Festival's digital exhibition for 2020.

On 2 November 2023, a solo exhibition of her work, entitled Blue Moments, Black Sounds – A Retrospective, opened at the Worldly, Wicked and Wise Gallery in North London, on show until 30 November. Reviewing the exhibition, Richard Williams wrote: "Val Wilmer is one of the most remarkable people I know, and you'll know that too if you've seen her photographs. Whether it's Muddy Waters playing cards with Brownie McGhee backstage at the Fairfield Halls in 1964, Archie Shepp sitting beneath a Jimi Hendrix poster in his New York apartment, or a joyful couple whose names we'll never know at a blues dance in Bentonia, Mississippi half a century ago, she finds the essence of the human spirit." The photobook published to accompany the exhibition, entitled Deep Blues 1960–1988, is "a striking collection showing African American blues musicians and their communities".

== Collections ==
Photographic works by Wilmer are held by the Arts Council of Great Britain Collection; the National Portrait Gallery; Victoria and Albert Museum; Musée d'Art Moderne, Paris; Fotografiska Museet, Stockholm; Smithsonian Institution, Washington DC; and the Schomburg Center for Research in Black Culture (New York Public Library).

== Bibliography ==
- Jazz People. London: Allison & Busby, 1970; Indianapolis: Bobbs-Merrill Company, 1970; reprinted Quartet Books, 1977. New edition Da Capo Press, 1991.
- The Face of Black Music: Photographs by Valerie Wilmer. New York: Da Capo Press, 1976.
- As Serious as Your Life: The Story of the New Jazz. London: Allison & Busby, 1977. New edition with introduction by Richard Williams from Serpent's Tail, March 2018, ISBN 978-1788160711.
- Mama Said There'd Be Days Like This: My Life in the Jazz World. London: Women's Press, 1989, ISBN 978-0704350403.
- Deep Blues 1960–1988. Café Royal Books, 2023.
- American Drummers 1959-1988. Café Royal Books, 2024.

== Awards and recognition ==
In 2009, Val Wilmer was honoured with a Parliamentary Jazz Award for Services to Jazz.

In July 2017, she featured in "The Wire Salon: An Audience with Val Wilmer" at Cafe Oto.

It has been said that "Wilmer is in every sense as important as the musicians and music she has documented." She is the subject of BBC Radio 3's Sunday Feature: A Portrait of Val Wilmer, produced by Steve Urquhart (featuring contributions from Margaret Busby, Paul Gilroy, Richard Williams, Andrew Cyrille, and Clive Wilmer), which was first broadcast on 4 March 2018. The following week, she was also featured by Robert Elms as a "Listed Londoner" on his BBC Radio London programme.

In 2019, Wilmer received the Lona Foote/Bob Parent Award for Career Excellence in Photography at the 24th annual Jazz Journalists Association Jazz Awards.

In 2020, Wilmer became a Patron of the National Jazz Archive.

In October 2023, Wilmer was interviewed by Cerys Matthews for The Blues Show on BBC Radio 2, featuring musicians whom Wilmer met and photographed such as Muddy Waters, Buddy Moss and Aretha Franklin. Wilmer had previously appeared with Matthews on a 2018 BBC Four television programme, Blues and Beyond, selecting their favourite blues musicians.

In 2024, she was chosen to be featured as a "castaway" on BBC Radio 4's Desert Island Discs on 4 February.

== Sources and further reading ==
- Bayley, Bruno. "England is the Place for Me: Val Wilmer's Hidden Photographs Uncovered. A Forgotten History of Black London", Vice, Vol. 15, no. 5.
- Contemporary Authors: A Bio-Bibliographical Guide to Current Writers in Fiction, General Nonfiction, Poetry, Journalism, Drama, Motion Pictures, Television, and Other Field: 85-88 (Detroit: Cengage Gale, 1980).
- Davies, Sue. Contemporary Photographers, Martin Marix Evans, ed. (New York: St. James Press, 1995).
- Fischlin, David, and Ajay Heble. The Other Side of Nowhere: Jazz, Improvisation, and Communities in Dialogue, 1st edition, Middletown: Wesleyan University Press, 2004.
- Ford, Robert. A Blues Bibliography (Bromley: Paul Pelletier Publishing, 1999; 2nd edition, New York: Routledge, 2007).
- Gannon, Robert. "Wilmer, Valerie", The New Grove Dictionary of Jazz, Barry Dean Kernfeld, ed. (London: MacMillan Press, 1988), p. 1299; entry revised by B. Kernfeld (2nd edition, 2002).
- Gray, John. Fire Music: A Bibliography of the New Jazz, 1959–1990 (Westport: Greenwood, 1991).
- Gray, Michael. The Bob Dylan Encyclopedia (London: Continuum International Publishing Group, 2006).
- McKay, George. Circular Breathing: The Cultural Politics of Jazz in Britain (Durham: Duke University Press, 2005).
- Mathieson, Kenny. Encyclopaedia of Blues. Komara, Edward, ed. (New York: Routledge, 2006).
- Oliphant, Dave. Jazz Mavericks of the Lone Star State (Austin: University of Texas Press, 2007).
- Trynka, Paul; photographs by Val Wilmer. Portrait of the Blues (New York: Da Capo Press, 1997).
- Wilmer, Valerie. "Monk on Monk", DownBeat, 3 June 1965: pp. 20–22.
- ---. "New York is Alive! Report and Photography by Valerie Wilmer". Jazz Forum, 1973: pp. 47–49.
- ---. "Rock and Roll Genius" [interview with Otis Blackwell]. Melody Maker, 5 February 1977, Vol. 52: pp. 8, 44.
- ---. "The first preference is pride" [interview with Jayaben Desai], Time Out, 15–21 September 1978, pp. 14–15.
- ---. "Gilmore and 'Trane: The Sun Ra Link". Melody Maker, 27 December 1980. Vol. 55: pp. 16–17.
- ---. "'I'm Happy as All Hell that the Man Took My Songs'" [interview with Otis Blackwell]. Time Out. 6–12 March 1981, pp. 12–13.
- ---. "Rudolph Dunbar". City Limits, March 1986: pp. 84–86.
- ---. "Mama Said There'd Be Days Like This: Valerie Wilmer Responds to Max Harrison's Review of her Book". Jazz Forum, 4 March 1990: pp. 4–5.
- ---. "How We Met: Lauderic Caton and Louis Stephenson". The Independent on Sunday Review, 7 February 1993: p. 61.
- ---. "Jimi Hendrix: An Experience". DownBeat, February 1994: pp. 38–40.
- ---. "The First Time I Met the Blues". Mojo, September 1995. 22: pp. 84–85.
- ---. "Spirits Rejoice: Albert and Don Ayler". Coda: The Journal of Jazz and Improvised Music, March–April 1997: pp. 4–7.
- ---. "Coleridge Goode: Improving with Age". Double Bassist, 2003: pp. 12–15.
- ---. "Roswell Rudd and the Chartreuse Phantasm". The Wire, Issue 249, November 2004: pp. 28–31.
- ---. "A Blue Mariner's Legacy". Double Bassist, 2005: pp. 24–26.
- ---. "Kitty Grime". Jazz Journal International, 2007: pp. 18–19.
- ---, "Jazz and Blues and Blues and Jazz", Vice, Vol. 16, no. 7, The Photo Issue 2009.
