= Terry Cryer =

British photographer (1934–2017)

- Born: 24 June 1934; Leeds, United Kingdom
- Died: 15 January 2017 (aged 82)
- Known for: British jazz and blues photography
- Spouse(s): Ann Dear (1957-1960s); Johanna Maria de Jong (mid 1960s-1981)

Terry Cryer (24 June 1934 – 15 January 2017) was a British jazz and blues photographer. Described by Mojo as "The Dean of UK jazz and blues photographers", Cryer is best known for portraits of some of the genre's most renowned performers.

== Early career ==
Cryer was born in Leeds, United Kingdom, to Richard and Florence Cryer and grew up in an impoverished household, which his mother left when he was a year old; at the same age he fell down some stairs, fracturing his skull and contracting spinal meningitis. At the age of fourteen Cryer worked for a film processing company called Cardigan D&P, mixing chemicals at 100 gallons a time. It was this experience that sparked his interest in photography. Three years later he joined the army and was sent by the War Office to take photographs in Egypt; Val Wilmer later noted, "his first job was producing identity cards for 400 fighting men of the East African Pioneer Corps. Coping with the difficulties of photographing dark faces using techniques designed for white ones stood him in good stead for his future portraits of African Americans." His first camera was a Reid (an imitation Leica), but he saved up his pay and upgraded to a superior twin-lens Rolleiflex camera.

Upon his return to Leeds, Cryer found employment at a Butlins holiday camp where he learned the art of speed printing. In his spare time he went door-to-door offering family photos until tuba player Bob Barclay opened his Studio 20 club in Leeds and invited Cryer to photograph the musicians who performed at the venue.

In 1956, Louis Armstrong played at the Free Trade Hall, Manchester – this was the first time Cryer had photographed a high-profile artist from the United States. Cryer then went on to tour with American artists such as Jimmy Rushing and Eddie Condon. However, returning from a Big Bill Broonzy gig in Manchester one night, Cryer broke his neck in a car accident. Rushing wrote to him whilst he was recovering in hospital and undeterred by his injury, Cryer was soon back working though still in plaster. Cryer said of the crash: "We had got pissed with Big Bill in the dressing room after the concert and Bob Barclay fell asleep at the wheel, it is not surprising we crashed!"

== London, 1957 ==
In 1957, Cryer relocated to London, living on Lisle Street opposite trumpeter and band leader Mick Mulligan. He found work as a freelance photographer with Jazz News, earning ten shillings for each photograph he took. Cryer later admitted that "I faked myself credentials and I got myself a press card. Was this honest? Who cares. I broke the rules because it was a lot more exciting than following them. The establishment move the goal posts to suit themselves. Why shouldn't I?" Cryer also married his first wife Ann Dear in 1957 while on tour with Chris Barber's Jazz Band. Barber was Best Man, Sister Rosetta Tharpe was Matron of Honour and Monty Sunshine, Chief Usher. Sister Rosetta treated the married couple to a night at Liverpool Adelphi as a gift. That night the group visited The Cavern and the newly married couple spent their honeymoon on tour with the band.

It was around this time that Cryer took some of his most iconic photographs. His 1958 portrait of Muddy Waters is now featured on the Mississippi Blues Trail to mark the location of his cabin at the Delta. In addition, Sammy Davis Jr., was so taken with Cryer's picture, captured in 1960, that he used it as his publicity shot throughout the next decade. Upon seeing the picture, he sent Cryer a note reading: ‘Dear Terry, it’s the best! Sammy x’.

== Other work ==
In 1960, Cryer joined the Associated Press agency and was subsequently assigned to work across the globe, including trips to Moscow. In his autobiography, he recalls finding himself developing film in lavatory pans behind the Iron Curtain. On his first trip to Russia in 1961 Cryer took a photograph entitled 'Russian Guards at Red Square'. The image received the Encyclopædia Britannica Award for Press Feature Picture of The Year 1961. It was on his second trip that he and his travelling companion were deported from Russia across the Polish border at Brest Litovsk. Cryer also produced candid portraits of personalities outside the jazz world. The photographed include Steve McQueen, Peter Sellers, Eartha Kitt and Paul McCartney. The latter explains "I’ve known Terry for many years as a mate and have admired his photographic work for as long as I can remember. Linda and I both respected his talent and his great photographic skills". Terry Cryer shared premises at Kirby street London around 1972.

== Awards, collections and points of interest ==
- Encyclopædia Britannica Award – Press Feature Picture of The Year 1961 for Russian Guards at Red Square
- Six Kodak Printer of the Year Awards – 1980s
- Cryer's photographs are held in numerous private and public collections including the Harry Ransom Center at the University of Texas.
- His portrait of Muddy Waters is image used on Mississippi Blues Trail to mark Water's Cabin at Clarksdale

=== Past exhibitions ===
1984 – Impressions Gallery, York

1990 – Northern School of Contemporary Dance, Leeds Festival

1993 – Special Photographer's Gallery, London

1995 – Salts Mill, Saltaire

1996 – Groucho Club, London

1997 – Focal Point Gallery, Nottingham

1998 – "Art in Yorkshire", Dean Clough

1998 – Brahms Advertising Agency Gallery

1999 – Burnley Blues Festival

2003 – National Museum of Photography, Bradford

2003 – Harvey Nichols, Leeds

2008 – Leeds University School of Music

2008 – "Love You All Madly", Smokestack, Leeds – curated by RedHouse Originals

2008 – "Love You All Madly", 3345 Parr Street, Liverpool – curated by RedHouse Originals

2008–09 – "Blues Anthology", Proud Gallery, London

2010 – "Music to My Eyes", 108 Fine Art, Harrogate – curated by RedHouse Originals

2010 – "The Mr Nice Project", RedHouse Originals, Harrogate

2011 – "Now & Then: Terry Cryer & Richard Fischer”, RedHouse Originals, Harrogate

2011 – “Fleet Street Hooligan”, RedHouse Originals, Harrogate

2011 – "Still Love You All Madly", SCF Hub Gallery, Southport – curated by RedHouse Originals

2011–12 – Harrogate Theatre

2012 – "The Time Is Now", RedHouse Originals, Harrogate

In the collection at Henry Ransom Center, University of Texas

Permanent displays of Dance Photography at Leeds General Infirmary and Northern School of Contemporary Dance

=== Portraits ===
Selected Highlights

- Ella Fitzgerald
- Muddy Waters
- Count Basie
- Louis Armstrong
- Miles Davis
- Nat King Cole
- Big Bill Broonzy
- Sister Rosetta Tharpe
- George Lewis
- Coleman Hawkins
- Sonny Stitt
- Clara Ward
- Paul Gonsalves
- Freddie Green
- Johnny Hodges
- Joe Newman
- Eddie Condon
- Bud Powell
- Sonny Terry and Brownie McGhee
- Dinah Washington
- Marie Knight
- Memphis Slim
- Jesse Fuller
- Ottilie Patterson
- Clara Ward
- Cozy Cole
- Phil Seamen

Film, Iconic, Social History etc.

- Elizabeth Taylor
- Richard Burton
- Peter O’Toole
- Charlton Heston
- Dustin Hoffman
- Steve McQueen
- Kirk Douglas
- Ava Gardner
- Judy Garland
- Dirk Bogarde
- Yves Saint Laurent
- Paul McCartney
- Linda McCartney
- Sammy Davis Jr.
- Peter Sellers
- Eartha Kitt
- Vanessa Redgrave
- Cliff Richard
- The Shadows
- Lena Horne
- Nikita Khrushchev
- Harold Wilson
- Margaret Thatcher
- Howard Marks

== Publications ==
- Terry Cryer (1992). Ian Clayton (ed.). One In The Eye. Yorkshire Act Circus. ISBN 0947780866.
