= Historypin =

Online archive of historical multimedia

Historypin is a digital, user-generated archive of historical photos, videos, audio recordings and personal recollections. Users are able to use the location and date of their content to "pin" it to Google Maps. Where Google Street View is available, users can overlay historical photographs and compare it with the contemporary location.

This content can be added and explored online. There were formerly a series of smartphone applications, but these were all discontinued as of 2015.

The project was created by the non-profit company Shift (formerly We Are What We Do), as part of their inter-generational work, with initial funding and support from Google as part of a series of commitments to digital inclusion. The website has over 200,000 assets and recollections "pinned" to the Historypin map around the world, with higher contributions in the UK, USA and Australia. The beta version of the website launched in June 2010 at the Royal Institute in London by Nick Stanhope, CEO of Shift and the full project was launched at the Museum of the City of New York in July 2011, with special guest speakers including Martin Luther King III and Harvard Professor Lawrence Lessig. The project was acquired by the non-profit Shift Collective in 2019. Since its founding, the project has raised over $9 million in funding to support community history projects around the world.

== Contributors ==
As well as user-generated content, material is added to the site from museums, local history societies, historical photo archives, newspaper archives and businesses. Contributors include Biggleswade History Society, Bishopsgate Institute, John Lewis Partnership, Mirrorpix, New York Transit Museum, PhillyHistory.org, The Ritz Hotel, Baltimore Museum of Industry and the Science & Society Picture Library and the Albright-Knox Art Gallery.
