= Charles Goss =

English librarian, polemicist and cataloguing innovator

Charles William Frederick Goss
- Born: 1864; Denmark Hill, London, England
- Died: 1946 (aged 81–82); London, England
- Occupations: Bibliographer; Librarian
- Known for: Polemics against open access libraries

Charles William Frederick Goss (1864–1946) was an English librarian, polemicist and cataloguing innovator. He worked in English public libraries at the turn of, and the early, twentieth century, and was prominent among opponents of open access libraries in the UK.

== Life and career ==
Goss was born in Denmark Hill, in South London, in 1864. He worked in Birkenhead and Newcastle public libraries, before becoming the first librarian in Lewisham (beating 300 other applicants to the post). He was forced out of this post, and left to become the librarian at the Bishopsgate Institute until he retired. While there, he campaigned to raise the status and pay of library staff. He retired in 1941, and died five years later. Whilst there, he established some of their special collections in London history, labour history, freethought and humanism.

== Open access controversy ==
Goss was a vocal opponent of the move to open access libraries (as opposed to closed access, where staff would fetch titles requested by readers, from the stacks) In 1898 he obtained an apology from James Duff Brown in the course of their heated debate in the pages of the library press after threatening him with a libel action. Duff Brown had been at the forefront of introducing open access.

== Descriptive cataloguing ==
Goss preferred the printed dictionary catalogue to the card catalogue. He further attempted to improve the usefulness of catalogues as a search tool, by adding a short description, close to what would now be considered an abstract of the text. This extra description of books was intended to complement and assist in closed access collections. One such catalogue he produced was A Descriptive Bibliography of the Writings of George Jacob Holyoake for the Bishopsgate library.

== Works ==
- Crosby Hall: a chapter in the History of London (1908)
- The London Directories, 1677-1855 (1932)
- A Descriptive Bibliography of the Writings of George Jacob Holyoake (1908).
