= Raissa Page =

Photographer 1932–2011

Raissa Page (née Cleone Alexandra Smilis, 23 October 1932 – 28 July 2011) was a documentary photographer whose twenty-year archive of work represents the marginalised at a time of social change in the late twentieth century. Her most well known image is a black and white panorama of women dancing on the nuclear missile silos at Greenham Common in 1983. She was also a founder member of the all-female Format Photographic Agency in the 1980s.

== Early life and education ==
Page was born Cleone Alexandra Smilis on 23 October 1932 in Toronto, Canada. She was the only child of a British mother and Macedonian father who had both immigrated to Canada. After leaving school at the age of sixteen, Page worked for the Canadian meteorological office on Prince Edward Island. She then moved to Vancouver and worked as a life model. She met Robin Page, a young English art student, and they married in Toronto in 1955. They settled in Britain and had a daughter, Rachel. The marriage did not last. Page then had a series of jobs such as working at Bernard Leach's pottery in St Ives. Rachel was then given to foster parents.

Page qualified as a social worker at North Western Polytechnic (now the University of North London). She went on to work in fostering and adoption sections of children's departments in the London districts of Tower Hamlets and Westminster. She joined the National Children's Bureau project, Who Cares?, launching a magazine and, in 1977, editing a book of the same name. Page joined an Orthodox church in London and took the name of Raissa, an eleventh century saint who was martyred in Alexandria.

== Photography ==
Page taught herself photography when in her forties. Still with a strong interest in social care, she worked on projects for Who Cares?, and for Social Work Today. She developed and printed her own photographs. A commission to photograph in colour took her to West Virginia, in 1978, for a series of portraits of women miners, their slogan being "Women Miners Can Dig It Too." In 1983, she photographed protesters at Greenham Common Women's Peace Camp. Perhaps her best-known image is of women protesters there dancing at dawn on New Year's Day on the nuclear missile silos. During the 1984–1985 United Kingdom miners' strike, Page photographed marches and demonstrations all over the country. Her work was printed in Striking Women: Communities and Coal (1986). She was a founder member of Format Photographic Agency, a women's photographic collective and collaborated with them for ten years. Page often photographed people who were marginalised, for example the unemployed, and the disabled, and dealt with unusual subjects such as the Falasha community in Israel, and patients at Friern Barnet psychiatric hospital, north London. She also travelled on photographic work to Cuba, India, China, the USA and Greece. She retired to Wales with severe arthritis when she was sixty.

She died on 28 July 2011, aged 78.

== Publications ==
- Who Cares?: Young People in Care Speak Out. Raissa Page and G. A. Clark (Eds) (1977)
- National Children's Bureau Enterprises. ISBN 978-0902817135.
- Striking Women: Communities and Coal. London: Pluto, 1986. Photographs by Page, Izabela Jedrzejczyk, Brenda Prince, and Imogen Young. ISBN 9780745301549. With essays by Siân James and Angela V. John.

== Legacy ==
The Raissa Page collection is housed at the Richard Burton Archives at Swansea University. It was made possible by a grant from the Wellcome Foundation.

One of her portraits is held in the National Portrait Gallery.

Her work was included in the photography exhibition Resistance held at the Turner Contemporary gallery in Margate, Kent in 2025.
