= Rosy Martin =

British still-life photographer

- Citizenship: United Kingdom
- Known for: Photography
- Notable work: Outrageous Agers, Too Close to Home?, I didn't put myself down for sainthood
- Website: Official website

Rosy Martin is a British still life-portraitist, photographer, published author, and cinematographer specializing in the medium of photography as memory. She is best known for her creation and usage of phototherapy, a practice that "[Explore's] the physical and social construction of identities within the drama of the everyday." Rosy Martin perpetuates these psychoanalytical ideas through the usage of re-enactment and photographic practices—wherein her subjects learn to overcome the struggles of the self through photographic embodiment.

Though this is the most prominent aspect of her work, Rosy Martin is also interested in the application of work that explores a multitude of themes, such as ageing, sexuality, desire, grief, shame, family dynamics, health, disease, and gender in society.

Rosy Martin, throughout her work, consistently uses her body as a subject of facsimile, working to break and invert the traditional relationship between both photographer and subject.

== Personal life ==
Very little is known of Rosy Martin's early personal life. Born on 20 November 1946, she spent her youth in a "1930s semi-detached suburban working-class house" which her father decorated by hand. As of now, Rosy Martin lives a council flat in London, as she has been for the last few decades. She received the flat through a 'hard to let' contract after she had been squatting there for several years.

== Professional life ==
Rosy Martin, before becoming an artist, first studied as a scientist—earning many academic achievements at a variety of institutions (see Education). What began her interest in art was when she met her long time collaborator and partner, Jo Spence in 1982–1983. Together, the two used their shared experiences to pioneer the practice of Phototherapy in 1983, and Rosy Martin began to fully immerse herself within the world of photography.

Rosy Martin has run both national and international exhibitions since 1985 and has given a multitude of phototherapy workshops in Universities and Galleries throughout Britain, the US, Canada, Eire, Italy, and Finland.

She has organized a number of community workshops including a womens prison, projects with survivors of sexual abuse, and school-based projects on digital identities.

Rosy Martin has previously been a lecturer in photographic theory, art history and visual culture at Staffordshire, Loughborough University, and Maidstone College of Art in the UK. She is a psychological therapist in private practice, and she briefly acted as a consultant researcher in a multi-disciplinary team on 'Representing self, representing aging' at Sheffield University.

== Phototherapy ==
Phototherapy, not to be confused with light therapy, is a practice of psychotherapy in which a person uses a multitude of personal photos taken by others to facilitate emotional healing, emotional access, and memory. This practice is said to help individuals explore the unconsciousness to better understand trauma and stress, while allowing them the opportunity to heal emotional wounds. It was created as an off-shoot to art therapy, and the term was coined and popularized by British photographer's Jo Spence and Rosy Martin during the 1980s.

== Artistic career ==
Much of Rosy Martins work was created after meeting her long time collaborator, Jo Spence. The two coined and pioneered the practice of Phototherapy. More specifically, the two perpetuated the idea of re-enactment phototherapy, A practice where one stages an environment based on the contents of a personal photograph and then "acts" out the scene to re-visit the underling trauma or emotions associated with the memory. This practice is said to help one understanding the causes for emotional scarring, and allows one to explore, processes, and transform these memories.

Rosy Martins first officially publicized work ran from 15 January 1985 – February 14, 1986, dubbed 'The Picture of Health?', which was a Jo Spence piece made in collaboration with Rosy Martin and Maggie Murray and exhibited in Camerawork, London. The work was meant as a record of Jo Spence's long battle with breast cancer, and showed viewers an insight into the various methods outside of modern medicine Jo Spence used to cope with her struggle.

== Prominent works ==
- Outrageous Agers: A collaborative exhibition made with Kay Goodridge that explores the intersectionality between age and womanhood.
- Too Close to Home?: An essay that explores an inquiry into the texture of place and memory through the notions of absent presence
- I didn't put myself down for sainthood: A collaboration with Verity Welstead in 2018 that explores themes of the psychic and social construction of identities within the drama of the everyday.

== Inspirations ==
One of Rosy Martins biggest and most prominent inspirations is her long-time partner Jo Spence. Jo Spence is a British photographer most famous for her cultural work, as well as her contributions to the creation of the practice of Phototherapy. Her meeting and collaboration with Jo Spence is what originally caused Rosy Martin to become interested in the photographic medium. Jo Spence's battle with breast cancer, as well as Jo Spence's prominent implementation of queer and feminist work heavily influenced the way Rosy Martin presents her own work.

Some additional inspirations of Rosy Martin include photographers such as Maggie Murray, Francoise Sergy, and Kay Goodridge.

== Education ==
- BSc (Special) Chemistry University College London (1967).
- Foundation Art and Design Croydon College of Art (1969)
- Postgraduate Diploma – Industrial Design (Engineering) (Central School of Art and Design)
- University of the Arts (1971)
- CNNA Postgraduate Diploma Design for Disability (London College of Furniture) London
- Metropolitan University (1982)
- Postgraduate Diploma in Counseling. Institute of Education, University of London (1995)

== Installed work ==
- I didn't put myself down for sainthood (1. installed work) in collaboration with Verity Welstead, 2018
- Rosy Martin in collaboration with Verity Welstead: Embracing Ageing and it's Discontents, 2020

== Exhibitions ==
- 1985: 'The Picture of Health?' Jo Spence in collaboration with Rosy Martin and Maggie Murray. Camerawork, London.
- 1986: 'Don't say cheese, say lesbian' by Rosy Martin and Jo Spence. Leeds Pavilion.
- 1987: 'Double exposure – the minefield of memory' by Rosy Martin and Jo Spence. Photographers Gallery, London.
- 1987: 'Transforming the suit – What do lesbians look like?' by Rosy Martin and Jo Spence in 'Body Politic'. Photographers Gallery, London.
- 1987: 'Barefoot Pacemaker' by Rosy Martin and Francoise Sergy in 'Gathering light'. Camerawork and Chisenhale Dance Space, London.
- 1988: 'Behind net curtains' by Rosy Martin and Jo Spence in 'Family my history – myself'. Untitled Gallery Sheffield.
- 1988: 'Notes from our psychic family albums' by Rosy Martin and Jo Spence in 'Matter of facts' – Contemporary British Photography – Musee des Beaux-Arts Nantes and touring in France 1988–89.
- October 1988: Spectrum – Women's Photography Festival.
- 1988: Unwind the Lies that Bind' in 'The Lesbian Gaze' The Young Unknowns
- 1988: 'Unwind the lies that bind' and 'Cultural worker?' in 'Photography and Self-portraiture' Women Artists Slide Library, Queen Elizabeth Hall, London.
- 1989: 'Gold'. Phototherapy collaboration between Rosy Martin and Francoise Sergy. Bradford Museum of Photography.
- 1989: 'Dirty Linen' – Phototherapy work by Rosy Martin and Jo Spence. Muziekcentrum Enschede, as part of 'British Photography' in the Foto Biennale Enschede, Netherlands.
- 1989: 'Happy Birthday – Junk Face' by Rosy Martin and Francoise Sergy. Prizewinner at the 'South Bank Photo Show', London.
- 1989: 'Through the Looking Glass – Photographic Art in Great Britain, 1945–89' Barbican Art Gallery, London.
- 1990: 'Jo Spence – collaborative works'. National tour in Australia.
- 1991: 'Family Matters?' by Rosy Martin and Jo Spence in 'Affairs of the Heart'. Untitled Gallery, Sheffield.
- 1991: 'Libido uprising' by Jo Spence and Rosy Martin in 'Exploring the unknown self – self-portraits of contemporary women'. Tokyo Metropolitan Museum of Photography.
- 1991: 'Missing Persons / Damaged Lives'. Jo Spence in collaboration with Rosy Martin, Ya'acov Khan, David Roberts and Tim Sheard. Leeds City Art Galleries.
- November/December 1991: 'Libido Uprising' Jo Spence in collaboration with Rosy Martin and 'Unbecoming Mothers' Jo Spence in collaboration with Rosy Martin, Tim Sheard and Ya'acov Khan in 'Embodiment'. Randolph Street Gallery. Chicago.
- 1991: 'The Generation(s) of Meaning' by Rosy Martin with Jo Spence, Penny Cloutte and Sue Isherwood and 'Unbecoming Mothers' by Jo Spence with Rosy Martin, Ya'acov Khan, Tim Sheard and Valerie Walkerdine in 'A Daughter's View'. Watershed, Bristol.
- 1991: 'I Pose a Paradox: a Discourse on Smoking' by Rosy Martin in 'Breaths: Art, Health and Empowerment'. Rochdale Art Gallery.
- January 1992: 'Memento mori' by Rosy Martin and Patti Levey. Third prizewinner at 'South Bank Photo Show', Festival Hall, London.
- September 1992: 'Transforming the suit – what does a lesbian look like' in #'Taboo: bodies talk'. 494 Gallery, 494 Broadway, New York. 'National Showcase Exhibition'. Alternative Museum, 594 Broadway, New York. July 1992.
- 1992: 'The minefield of memory: a day in the life of a school girl, circa 1962'. 494 Gallery, 494 Broadway, New York.
- January 1993: 'Body politics' by Rosy Martin, Jo Spence and Shari Caroline Diamond. PS 122 Gallery, 150 First Avenue, New York City.
- 1993: 'Middle class values?' by Jo Spence and Rosy Martin in 'Renegotiations: Class, Modernity and Photography'. Norwich Gallery.
- Circa 1994: 'The minefield of memory: a day in the life of a school girl
- March/April 1994: 'Transforming the suit' Randolph Street Gallery, Chicago.
- February/March 1994: 'New mournings?' by Rosy Martin in 'In search of self'. Women's self-portrait group show. Photofusion, London.
- June 1994: 'A rite of inheritance' by Rosy Martin in 'Relative Values'. Photographers Gallery, London.
- June/July 1994: 'Learning letting go' by Rosy Martin in 'Make believe: South Bank Photo Show'. Festival Hall, London.
- September/October 1994: 'Matters of concern: collaborative images 1982–1992' Jo Spence with Rosy Martin, David Roberts, Valerie Walkerdine, Terry Dennett, Ya'acov Khan and Maggie Murray. Festival Hall, London
- September 1994: 'Fabrications' and 'Transforming the suit: what do lesbians look like' in 'The Sexual Perspective'. Jill George Gallery, London
- September/October 1994: 'New mournings' and 'Lighten up' by Rosy Martin in 'Creating the subject' Women's self-portrait show. Morley Gallery, London
- September/October 1994: 'Memento mori' by Rosy Martin / Patti Levey and 'The candle of hope: acceptance' by Rosy Martin / Shari Diamond in 'Stones in her pockets'. MAC Birmingham.
- September 1994: 'Great expectations' by Rosy Martin in 'Resourceful women' Flaxman Gallery. Stoke-on-Trent.
- October/November 1994: 'Fabrications' by Rosy Martin in 'On the funny side'. Photofusion. London.
- June/July 1995: 'Traces of my parents' in 'Home Truths' South Bank Photo Show. Festival Hall, London
- 1995: 'netyourother' by Rosy Martin and Nicky West in 'internet.sex.identity' to launch channel
- June/July 1996: 'Out takes' by Rosy Martin in 'Pride in Diversity' City Art Centre. Dublin.
- September 1996: 'Pathways and traces: engendering a sense of the city' in 'City Limits'. Staffordshire University
- September/October 1996: 'The minefield of memory' and 'Out-Takes'. Floating Gallery. Winnipeg.
- November/December 1996: 'Out Takes' in 'Open Ended' Tom Blau Gallery
- February/April 1997: 'Finding questions' and 'The body remembers' in 'The Found Photograph' at Northbrook Photography Gallery
- June 1997: 'Poor relations?' and 'Out Takes' in A1 Art -Islington International Festival 14–28
- March 1998: 'Pathways and traces: engendering a sense of the city' Wysing Arts Gallery
- February 1998: 'Out Takes' and 'The body remembers' in 'Troubling Customs' at Ontario College of Art and Design Gallery; Museum of Fine Arts, Boston June 1998.
- June/July 1998: 'And then ...' in 'Confrontations' RHA-Gallagher Gallery. Dublin.
- January/February 1999: 'Too close to home?' in 'Obsessions' Standpoint Gallery. London.
- June/July 1999: 'Too close to home?' in 'Video Invidious' Arthouse. Dublin.
- September 1999: 'The Phototherapist's Tale' – one of 29 pilgrims in '/broadcast' Nina Pope and Karen Guthrie Tate Modern – Bankside
- February/March 2000: 'Outrageous Agers' with Kay Goodridge Lighthouse Gallery. Wolverhampton. www.varchive.org.uk/outrageous
- 2000: 'Too close to home?' in 'Obsessions' – @ Hereford Photography Festival – Exposure 2000 Globe Gallery Hay-on-Wye
- September/October 2001: 'Outrageous Agers' (mark 2) with Kay Goodridge – including 6 video installations. Focal Point Gallery, Cliffs Pavilion and the Shopping Centre. Southend. www.varchive.org.uk/outrageous
- 2002: Too close to home?' and 'The Sitting Room' in 'Obsessions II' Huddersfield Art Gallery (Photographic and video installations)
- 2002: 'The vagina begins to shrivel ...' in 'Art, Age and Gender' Orleans House London
- 2003: 'Outrageous Agers' (mark 3) with Kay Goodridge – including 5 video pieces. Peri Photographic Gallery Turku Finland
- 2003: 'Too close to home?' and 'The Sitting Room' Folly Gallery Lancaster
- 2003: 'Bodyscapes': extract from 'Outrageous Agers' in 'What does Obesity mean to you?' Air Gallery, London
- 2007: 'The Picture of Health?' Jo Spence in collaboration with Rosy Martin and Maggie Murray Documenta 12 Kassel Germany
- 2008: 'Getting Changed' in 'Beware Personal' at K Turku Arts Institute Finland
- 2010: 'Too close to home? Holding the everyday still' Durham Art Gallery
- March/April 2011: 'Look at me! Representing self, representing Ageing' Featuring Phototherapy Workshop participants' photographs. Showroom Sheffield
- 2012: 'Getting Changed' Senate House London March
- 2013: 'Touch has a memory' with Seija Ulkuniemi in 'A Photograph is Not An Opinion – Contemporary Photography by Women'. Focus Photography Festival Mumbai India
- 2013: Self portraits in 'Il Corpo Solitario'. Palazzo della Penna Perugia Italy
- 2014: 'Hailuoto chic' and 'Embracing transience' in Selfportrait.extended' International Exhibition at Turku Arts Academy.
- 2014: 'In Situ' and 'Acts of Reparation' (with Kay Goodridge) in 'Family Ties: Reframing memory' Peltz Gallery London
- 2015: 'In Situ' and 'Acts of Reparation' (with Kay Goodridge) in Uncertain States Open Call
- 2015: 4 Corners Gallery London
- 2015: 'Stuff: all that remains' (7mins 30 secs) and 'Acts of Reparation' in 'Co-axial'. The Cass Gallery London Metropolitan University 2015
- 2015–2016: 'Libido uprising' in 'Jo Spence Spotlight' Tate Britain London
- July 2017: 'Acts of reparation' and 'In situ' in 'Visualising the Home' Carlisle Photo Festival
- 'Cultural Sniping: Photographic Collaborations' in the Jo Spence Memorial Library Archive' Peltz Gallery London 2019
- 2019–2020: Phototherapy Jo Spence and Rosy Martin 1984–86 in 'Misbehaving Bodies: Jo Spence & Oreet Ashery' Wellcome Collection
- 2020: 'In Situ', 'Nesting' and 'Immersion' with Seija Ulkuniemi in 'Occupy the Void' Photo50 London Art Fair, London
- 2020: 'Lockdown: Then venturing out' and 'Nest time to go' with Verity Welstead in 'Home and away collective' at Collectives Hub. Brighton Photo Fringe. Phoenix House Art Space
- 2020: 'I didn't put myself down for sainthood' with Verity Welstead in 'The Picture of Health – Women photographers from the Hyman collection' at Arnolfini Bristol
- 2021: 'Acts of reparation', 'In situ' and 'End of the Line' in 'Loss' at artP.kunstverein Perchtoldsdorf Vienna
- 2021–2022: 'Letting go' and 'Immersion' in 6th Biennial of Fine Art & Documentary Photography, Barcelona
- 2022: 'End of the Line' and 'Stuff: all that remains' in 'Family and other Ties' at University of the Creative Arts Farnham
- Writing her own Script. Women Photographs from the Hyman Collection
- 14 May 2023 Somerset House, London10
- A Picture of Health. Women Photographers from the Hyman Collection
- 1 July 2021: Arnolfini, Bristol14 Nov 2020

== Publications ==
- 'New portraits for old: the use of the camera in therapy'. Rosy Martin and Jo Spence.
- Feminist Review, No 19, March 1985.
- 'Phototherapy' in 'Putting myself in the picture' Jo Spence. Camden Press. London 1986.
- 'Phototherapy: new portraits for old' Rosy Martin and Jo Spence in 'Looking on – images of
- femininity in the visual arts and media'. Edited by Rosemary Betterton. Pandora. London
- 'Phototherapy: transforming the school photo. Happy days are here again.' by Rosy Martin in
- 'Photography Politics 2'. Edited by Patricia Holland, Jo Spence and Simon Watney, 1987
- Commedia/Photography Workshop. London 1987.
- 'What do lesbians look like?' Rosy Martin and Jo Spence in Ten8 No 25 Body Politics, June 1987
