= Ivy House =

- Casa cu Iederă
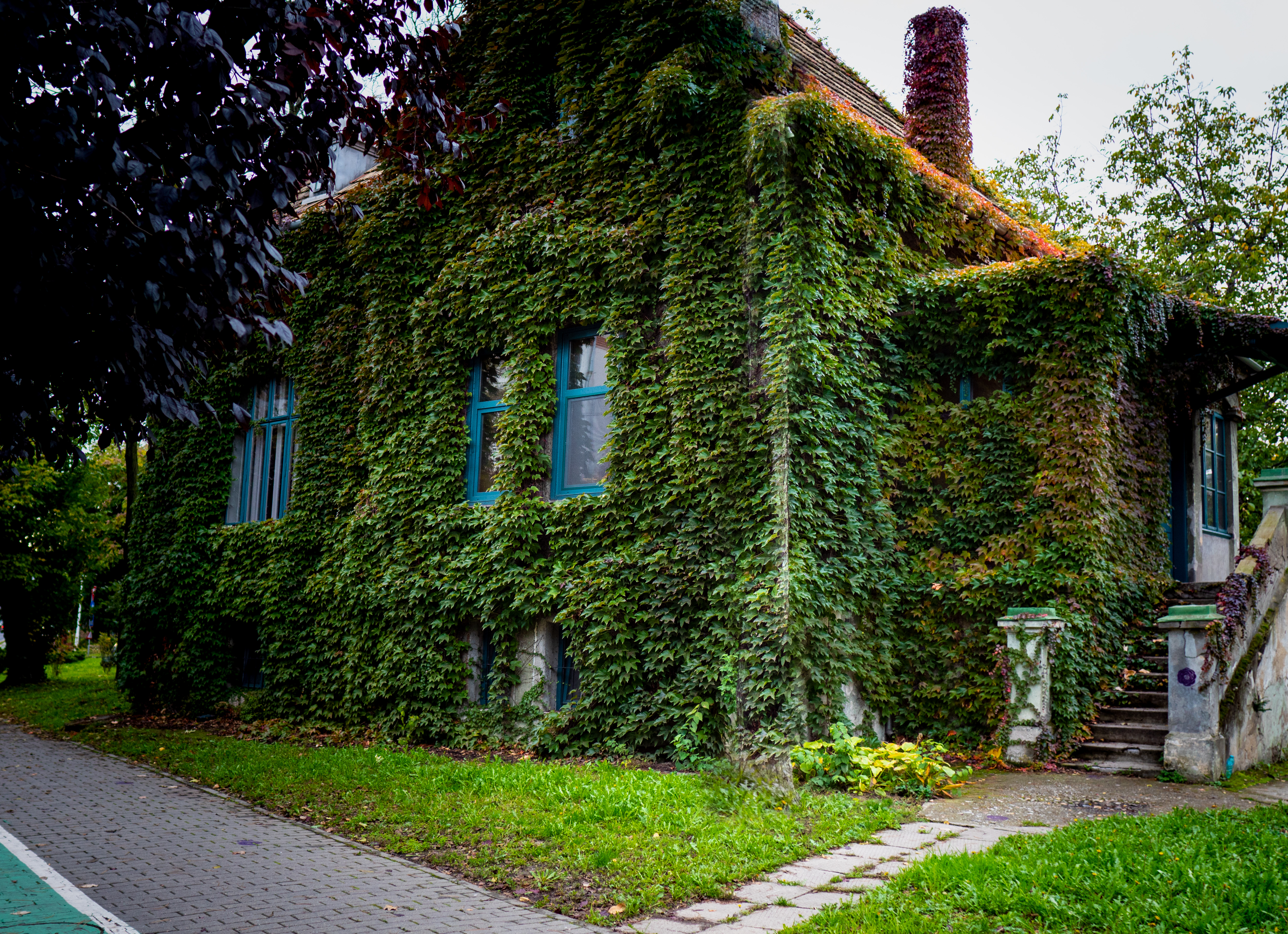
- Interactive map of the Ivy House area

General information
- Location: 9 Corneliu Coposu Boulevard, Timișoara, Romania
- Coordinates: 45.7512915°N 21.2380389°E
- Year built: 1902

Design and construction
- Architect: Lipót Löffler

The Ivy House (Romanian: Casa cu Iederă) in Timișoara, Romania, is a villa, designed by architect Lipót Löffler in 1902. It is the only villa still standing from the city's original horticultural complex. The name originates from the Canadian vine that drapes over its entire main facade, which is often mistaken for an ivy curtain.

== History ==
After the 1891 Industrial and Agricultural Exhibition in Timișoara, along with the landscaping of the Bega Canal banks and, more notably, the city's urban development (particularly the street connecting Fabric and Cetate, which passed through the site of the city's former horticultural colony), the decision was made to relocate and construct a new dedicated complex.

In the early 20th century, after a public tender for the construction of a new horticultural complex, which was to include an administrative building, greenhouses, and service structures, the project was awarded to architect Lipót Löffler. The complex, covering three acres, was constructed on the southern bank of the Bega Canal, close to the discharge area of the Suboleasa Canal (which is now covered).

The Ivy House, as it is referred to in the local language today, once served as the headquarters of the Horticultural Society. During the interwar period, it was led by Mihai Demetrovici, who succeeded the gardener Franz Niemetz in this role. Together, they worked alongside the esteemed Árpád Mühle, the president of the Gardeners' Association of Timișoara.

The house was owned for many years by the company responsible for managing the city's parks and green spaces. It is believed that, during the communist era, it served as a secret residence for the Securitate. After the Revolution, the Timișoara City Hall sold the property. Following several changes of ownership, it was eventually acquired by a company that intended to build an office building on the site. However, they were denied authorization, and the Ivy House remained standing.

It now houses Terra Apis, a local business offering honey and honey-based products, and also features an exhibition called the "Mühle Museum," which honors the families of gardeners and landscapers from Timișoara.

== Architecture ==
Ivy House is a building constructed in 1902, reflecting the characteristic style of Timișoara's early urban residential architecture. The property belongs to the typology of early 20th-century villas, distinguished by its balanced volumetric composition, close relationship with the surrounding garden, and harmonious integration into the green urban fabric developed along the Bega Canal.

The building is attributed to architect and master builder Lipót Löffler, who worked extensively in Timișoara during the first decades of the 20th century. Löffler is recognized for his contributions to the city's residential and utilitarian architecture, being involved in the design of buildings that combined functionality with a restrained architectural language suited to the modern urban context of the period.

From a stylistic perspective, Ivy House displays features characteristic of interwar architecture, shaped by restrained modernist influences, including simple façades, clear proportions, an emphasis on functionality, and an open relationship between interior and exterior spaces. A distinctive feature of the building is the abundant vegetation that gradually came to cover the façade and adjacent structures, contributing both to its visual identity and to its present-day name.

Despite the functional changes introduced after 2017, when the property was taken over by the Bădina family, Ivy House retained its fundamental architectural configuration, being adapted for cultural uses without major interventions affecting either its structure or architectural expression.
