= Jo Spence =

British photographer

- self portrait
- Born: 15 June 1934; London, United Kingdom
- Died: 24 June 1992 (aged 58); London, United Kingdom
- Known for: Photography

Jo Spence (15 June 1934, London – 24 June 1992, Camden) was a British photographer, writer, cultural worker, and photo therapist. She began her career in the field of commercial photography but soon started her own agency which specialised in family portraits, and wedding photos. In the 1970s, she refocused her work towards documentary photography, adopting a politicised approach to her art form, with socialist and feminist themes revisited throughout her career. Self-portraits about her own fight with breast cancer, depicting various stages of her breast cancer to subvert the notion of an idealised female form, inspired projects in 'photo therapy', a means of using the medium to work on psychological health.

== Early life ==
Jo Spence was born on 15 June 1934 in London to working-class parents. Both of her parents worked in factories, and she left school at the age of 13. She later attended a secretarial college, and, in the 1950s, she became a secretary in a photographic studio.

== Career ==
Spence started off as a wedding photographer and ran a studio from 1967–1974. Soon afterwards, she began documentary work in the early 1970s, motivated by her political concerns. Both a socialist and feminist, she worked to represent these issues through her practice of photography, first as a founding member of the Hackney Flashers (1974), a collective of broadly feminist and socialist women who produced exhibitions such as 'Women and Work' and 'Who's Holding the Baby'. She was subsequently active in establishing the Photography Workshop (1974), a group focused on education and publishing, including its Camerawork magazine (1976–1985), along with the socialist historian of photography Terry Dennett (1938-2018), with whom she continued to collaborate for the rest of her life.

In 1974 Dennett and Spence made a series of documentations in sound and image of Roma people and Travellers whom they befriended in 'illegal' encampments in the London area. Never exhibited or released in book form, it was only posthumously, in 2025 that 280 images from the project were published in Our Studio Was The World.

In 1979, Spence studied the theory and practice of photography at the Polytechnic of Central London with photo theorist Victor Burgin. She gained a first class Honours Degree and moved on from her previous notions of photography, taking greater account of visual semiotics manifested in the medium. With fellow students Mary Ann Kennedy, Jane Munro and Charlotte Pembrey, Spence co-founded The Polysnappers. During the late 1970s and into the early 1980s her work became more focused on themes of domesticity and family life. In a companion piece for Beyond the Family Album, Public Images, Private Conventions she wrote on how she wished to "question [...] who represents who in society, how they do it and for what purpose."

In 1982, she was diagnosed with breast cancer. After her diagnosis, Spence started to focus on identity, subjectivity, mental and physical health. She rejected conventional therapy and explored holistic therapy and the personal and feminist political dimension of living with cancer. It was through experiencing the effectiveness of using photography in confronting and documenting her hospitalisation and illness that Spence, with Rosy Martin, developed 'photo therapy' in which the subject was empowered to control their image to discover and represent unexpressed or repressed feelings and ideas. By working collaboratively the person in front of the camera was both subject and author of the image. Other collaborators/therapists included Ya'acov Kahn, David Roberts and Dr Tim Sheard.

Alongside her photography, Spence maintained a career as an educator, writer, and broadcaster.

== Death and legacy ==
Spence undertook a three-month tour with her work to Australia, Canada, and the United States before discovering that she had leukemia, from which she later died in London in June 1992, shortly after a civil marriage in May formalising her partnership with David Roberts. Terry Dennett, who was a former collaborator and friend of Spence, was the curator of the Jo Spence Memorial Archive.

Spence left recordings in which she spoke about her life; one a seven-hour British Library interview and a self-recorded tape which were released in 2026 in book form. The transcriptions detail her early and working life, her feminist political convictions and thoughts on class, and how those motivated her radical approach to documentary practice. Also recorded are her candid revelations about her chronic illness, on her relationships, and her struggle to survive while persisting in her self-directed, often unpaid, life-long practice.

== Works ==
- 1973–75: Children's Rights Workshop; documentary
- 1979: Beyond The Family Album
- 1980: Fairy Tales and Photography, BA thesis, republished 2020
- 1980–82: Remodelling Photo History
- 1980–82: The Polysnappers
- 1982–86: The Picture of Health?
- 1982: Cancer Shock, Photonovel

=== 1984–onwards: Photo therapy projects ===
- 1988–89: Narratives of Dis-ease: Ritualised Procedures, produced with psychotherapist, Dr Tim Sheard
- 1989: Libido Uprising, photo therapy works produced with Rosy Martin and Spence's partner David Roberts
- 1990: Cultural Sniper, produced by Spence and David Roberts
- 1990: Jo Spence in collaboration with Terry Dennett: Collaborative works; Australian tour of Melbourne, Victorian Centre for Photography at the George Paton Gallery, University of Melbourne Sept. 27-Oct. 11; Sydney, Tin Sheds Gallery, University of Sydney, Oct. 17-Nov. 11; Adelaide, Experimental Art Foundation Nov. 22-Dec. 16.
- 1991–92: The Crisis Project: Scenes of the Crime. Unfinished collaboration with Terry Dennett
- 1991–2: The Final Project
- 1991–92: Metamorphosis
- 1992: Hospice Diaries

== Publications ==
- Terry Dennett, David Evans, Sylvia Gohl and Jo Spence, Photography/Politics: One, (London: Photography Workshop, 1979)
- Spence, Jo; Cambridge Darkroom (1985), Jo Spence : working photography, Cambridge Darkroom
- Patricia Holland, Jo Spence and Simon Watney, Photography/ Politics: Two, (London: Photography Workshop/Comedia, 1986)
- Jo Spence: Putting Myself in the Picture: a Political, Personal and Photographic Autobiography. Frances Borzello, editor. Camden Press. 1986. ISBN 0-948491-14-0

=== Posthumous ===
- Jo Spence and Joan Soloman (Ed.), What Can a Woman Do with a Camera?: Photography for Women, (London: Scarlet Press, 1995)
- Jo Spence. Beyond the Perfect Image. Photography, Subjectivity, Antagonism, MACBA Exhibition catalogue, (Barcelona: MACBA, 2005)
- Jo Spence: The Final Project. Louisa Lee, editor. Ridinghouse. 2013. ISBN 978-1-905464-81-4
- Spence, Jo; Dennett, Terry B. (2025). Our studio was the world: fighting discrimination against the Gypsy, Roma and Traveller Community. Edinburgh, Scotland: Museums etc. ISBN 9781912528592.
- Spence, Jo (2026). Jo Spence: the unknown recordings. Edinburgh, Scotland: Museums etc. ISBN 9781912528646.

== Bibliography ==
- Gill Saunders, 'Nature Versus Culture,' in The Nude: A New Perspective, pp.91–115. . Cambridge: Harper & Row, 1989 ISBN 0-06-430189-3
- Charles Hagen, Photography View: Turning the Lens Inward. The New York Times, Sept.22, 1991, (Arts)
- Jo Stanley (Ed.), Jo Spence: Cultural Sniping: The Art of Transgression, (London: Routledge, 1995) ISBN 0-415-08883-6
- Graham Clarke, The Photograph. Oxford University Press. pp.139–140 (from the series The Oxford History of Art), 1997 ISBN 0-19-284200-5, ISBN 978-0-19-284200-8
- Robert Hirsch, Seizing the Light, McGraw Hill. 1999. ISBN 978-0-697-14361-7
- Terry Dennett, "The wounded photographer: The genesis of Jo Spence's 'camera therapy'", Afterimage Vol 29/No 3, p26–27, (Rochester, NY: Visual Studies Workshop, 2001).
- Susan Bell, Photo images: Jo Spence's narratives of living with illness, Health Journal Vol 6/No 1, p5–30, (London: Sage, 2002)
- H. Hagiwara (Ed.), Jo Spence autobiographical photography, (Osaka: Shinsuisha Press, 2005)
- Jorge Ribalta, 'The continuing pertinence of Jo Spence,' Camera Austria, Vol 94/ No 36, (Graz: Camera Austria, 2006)
- Terry Dennett, 'Jo Spence's camera therapy: personal therapeutic photography as a response to adversity', European Journal of Psychotherapy & Counselling, Vol 11/ No 1, p7–19, (London: Routledge, 2009)
- Terry Dennett, 'Jo Spence's Auto-therapeutic survival strategies,' Health Journal Vol 15/No 3, p223–29, (London: Sage, 2011)

== Archives ==
- Fonds Jo Spence. Paris: Bibliothèque Kandinsky, Centre Pompidou. Retrieved 02.04.2024.

== See also ==
- The Hackney Flashers
