= Four Corners Gallery =

Arts centre in London

The Four Corners Gallery and film project is an arts centre dedicated to independent photography and film-making located on Roman Road in Bethnal Green, London, UK. It hosts exhibitions, film production facilities and screenings of new work. The project was founded nearby in 1973; it moved into its present purpose-built premises in 2007.

Initially it survived on tiny funding; it then received money from Channel 4 during the 1980s. Its expansion has been supported by Arts Council England, the London Development Agency, the European Regional Development Fund, Film London and the London Borough of Tower Hamlets.
