= Susie Warran-Smith =

British author and broadcaster

Susie Warran-Smith, CBE, DL is a British author and broadcaster. She was appointed the Commander of the Order of the British Empire (CBE) in Elizabeth II's 2022 New Year Honours and Deputy Lieutenant (DL) of Kent.

== Biography ==
Warran-Smith graduated from the University for the Creative Arts. She attended Staffordshire University and graduated with an MBA in 1995. Warran-Smith started her career as a designer in advertising agencies in London in the mid-1980s, becoming a brand specialist and a guest lecturer at the University for the Creative Arts. She became a marketing and communications director in corporate roles, including at Barclays Bank. In 2015, she founded Breakthrough Funding, which was sold to Ernst & Young in 2020. She was a non-executive member of the Audit and Risk Committee at the Department for Communities and Local Government (now DLUHC) from 2006 to 2012 and was appointed Chair of Produced in Kent in June 2021. She is a non-executive director of His Majesty's Revenue and Customs (HMRC).
