= Juna Mahal =

Palace Complex in Dungarpur

Coordinates: 23.8282°N 73.7159°E

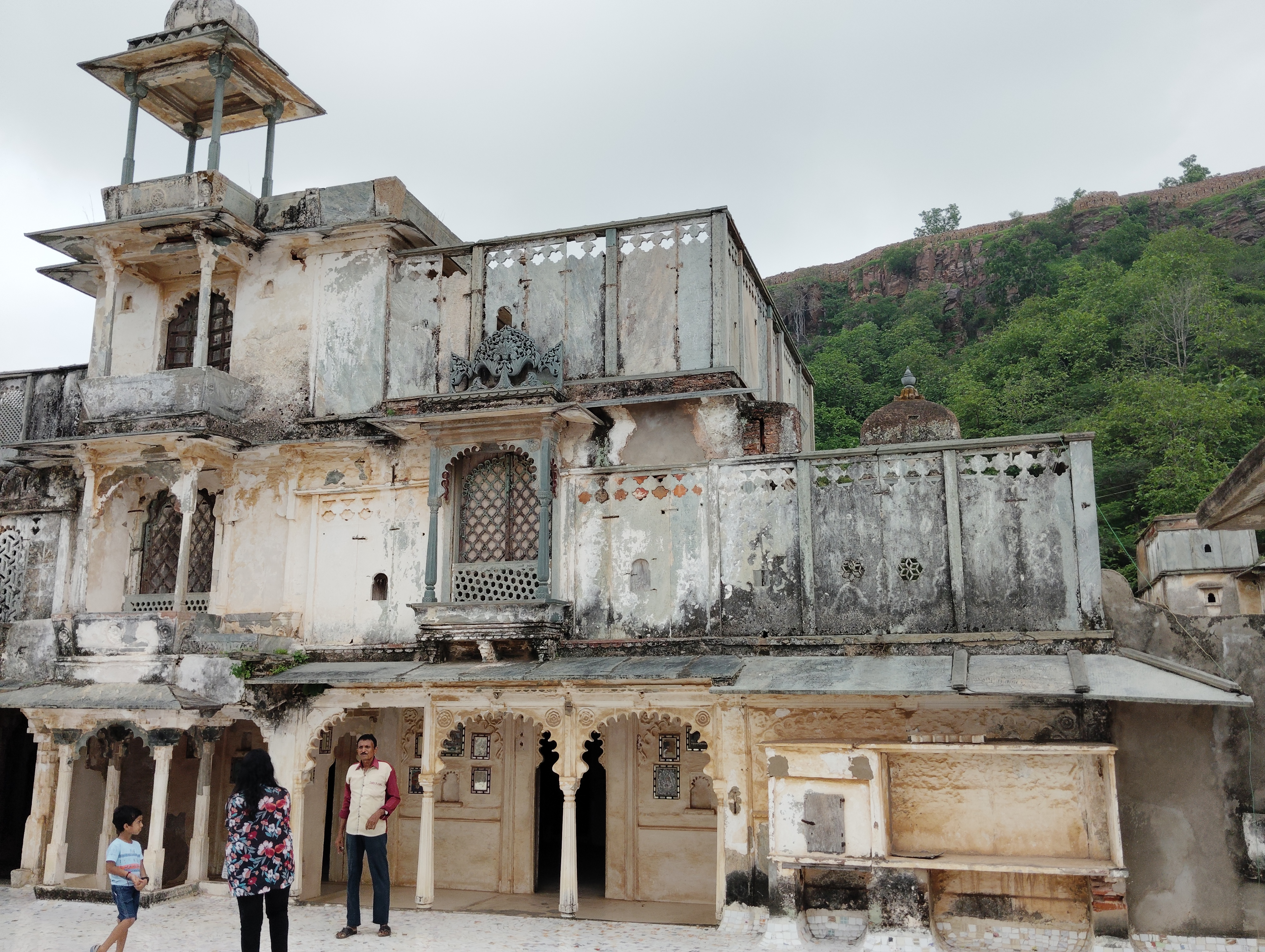
- Juna Mahal Dungarpur 2024
- Interactive map of Juna Mahal
- Location: Dungarpur, Rajasthan, India
- Built: 13th century
- Owner: Harshvardhan Singh

Juna Mahal, also known as the Old Palace or Garh Palace, is a palace complex situated in the city of Dungarpur in the Indian state of Rajasthan. It is situated at the foothills of the Dhanmata Hill. The property is still owned by the former royal family of Dungarpur.

== History ==
The first palace on the site was built in the late 13th century. It was expanded over the centuries by successive Maharawals of Dungarpur, with additional rooms, wings, floors, courtyards, and fortifications, until it became a seven-story complex. It is built on a high platform constructed from pareva stone. Its rugged exterior gives it the appearance of a citadel. The structure features fortified walls, watchtowers, and narrow corridors and doorways, all of which were designed to delay the enemy for as long as possible. A shrine is built into one of its walls in memory of the two wives whose husband, Dungaria, was killed by Maharawal Vir Singh. When the wives intended to curse him, Vir Singh, to protect himself and his descendants from the curse, agreed to name the town he was founding after their husband and had the shrine constructed in their honor, as they had committed sati.

Over the course of several centuries, its walls were richly painted with murals; however, the earliest of these are unsigned. During the reign of Maharawal Udai Singh II, several artistic works were undertaken at Juna Mahal. From 1864 to 1875, an artist named Devji painted murals on its walls. Later, from 1883 to 1886, the Nathu and Chhagan brothers from Udaipur were commissioned to repair and refurbish several areas of the palace. Their work included the restoration of the Am Khas, a reception room, and the refurbishment of the Devji cut-glass inlay in the Shish ka Kamara, or glass room. Their work was part of the preparations for the second marriage of Udai Singh's son, Khuman Singh, which occurred in 1886. In later years, Udai's great-grandson, Maharawal Laxman Singh, invited two groups of artists from Nathdwara to work at Juna Mahal and decorate it. In 1939, Laxman Singh called upon an artist named Kanhaiyalal from the Shrinathji Temple in Nathdwara to work at Juna Mahal. Kanhaiyalal traveled to Dungarpur accompanied by another artist, Kajorimal. During his time there, Kanhaiyalal primarily worked on the ground floor, including the Durbar Hall, Am Khas, and Shish ka Kamara, where he touched up and repaired damaged paintings. In certain cases, he replaced the original murals with his own compositions. The artwork at Juna Mahal is better preserved than that of any other palace in Rajasthan.

It was used until the mid-20th century, when the then Maharawal moved his residence from there to Udai Bilas Palace. It was included in the 2014 World Monuments Watch to highlight its historical and artistic significance and raise public awareness.

== Structures within the complex ==
=== Am Khas ===
Udai Singh II added Am Khas, a large audience hall, to the structure. It served dual purposes: as the Diwan-i-Khas for receiving courtiers and state guests, and as the Diwan-i-Am, where members of the general public could present their grievances. The hall is very conservative in style, with its ceiling supported by columns. Adjacent to it is a Hingrat, a small personal chamber, whose surfaces are entirely covered in glass inlay work. Adjacent to it is a Hingrat, a small personal chamber, with surfaces entirely covered in glass inlay work. It also incorporates portraits of the Maharawals of Dungarpur, which are surrounded by floral and animal motifs. The floor is laid with mirrored and painted tiles.

=== Chini Gokhada ===
Chini Gokhada, also known as the Chinese balcony, is decorated with 144 Staffordshire Blue Willow Pattern plates embedded in the four walls. It is complemented by additional murals and mirror work. One of the painted plate in it shows a miniature of the Maharawal of Dungarpur sitting in a garden and receiving visitors. It was used as a private durbar hall in the late nineteenth century, overlooking Kothar Chowk, a storage area, where the public was invited and spectacles were held.

== In popular culture ==
In 2008, Karen Knorr traveled to Rajasthan, where she captured a series of photographs depicting Indian interiors with animals from Indian folklore. She also visited Dungarpur, where she photographed several images at Juna Mahal, which are part of her work titled India Song.

== Gallery ==
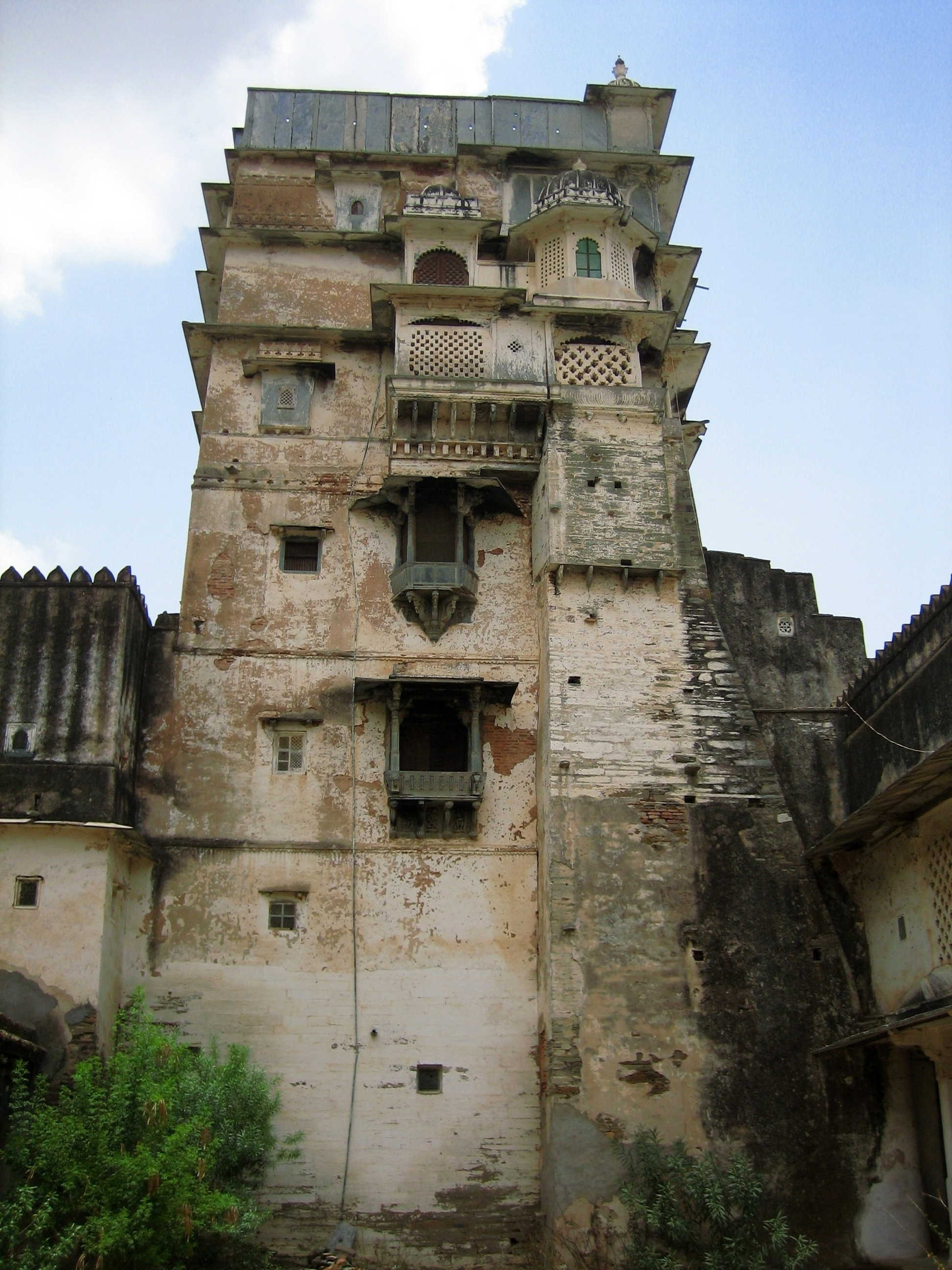
View of the Juna Mahal

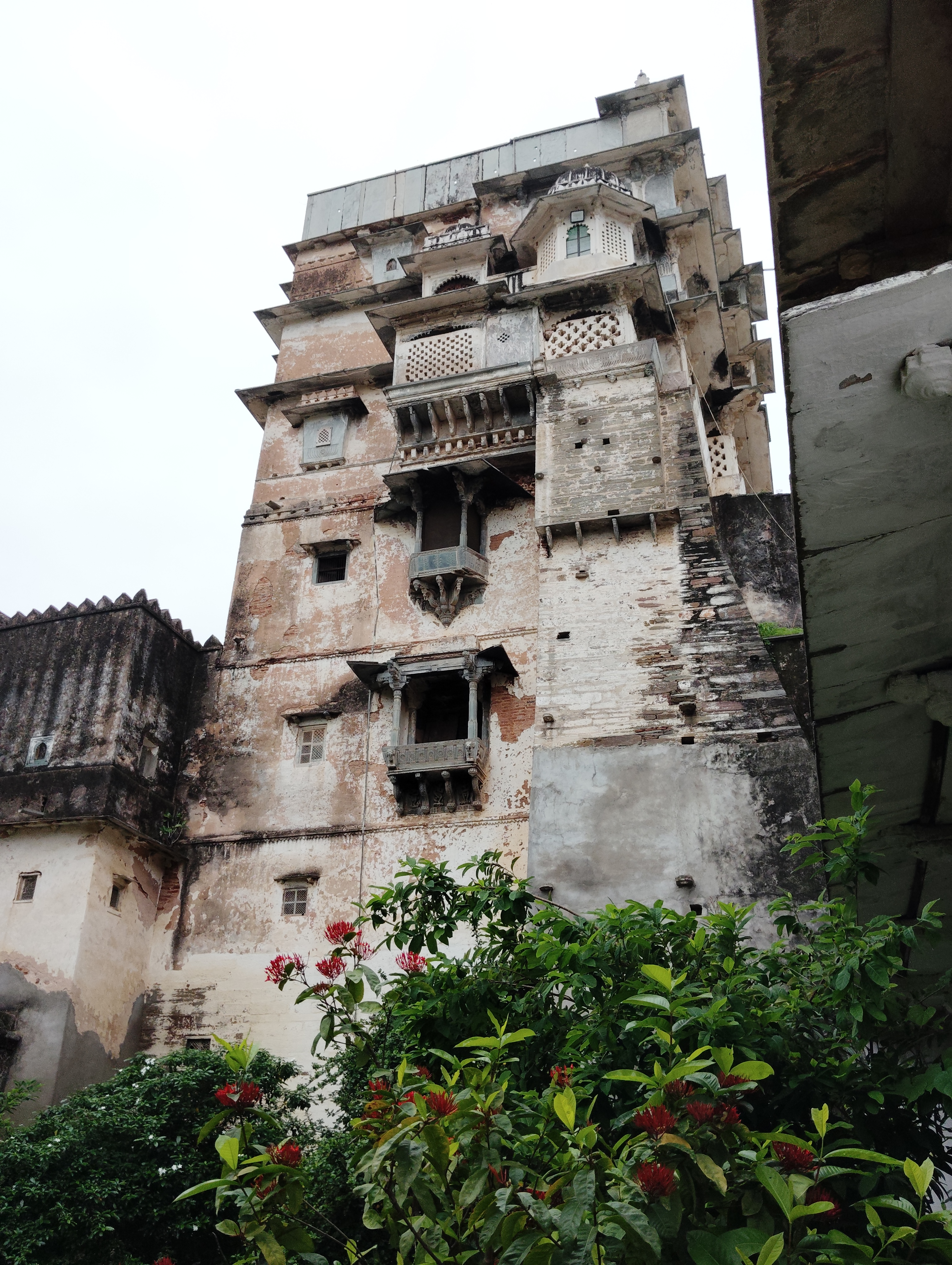
View of the Juna Mahal

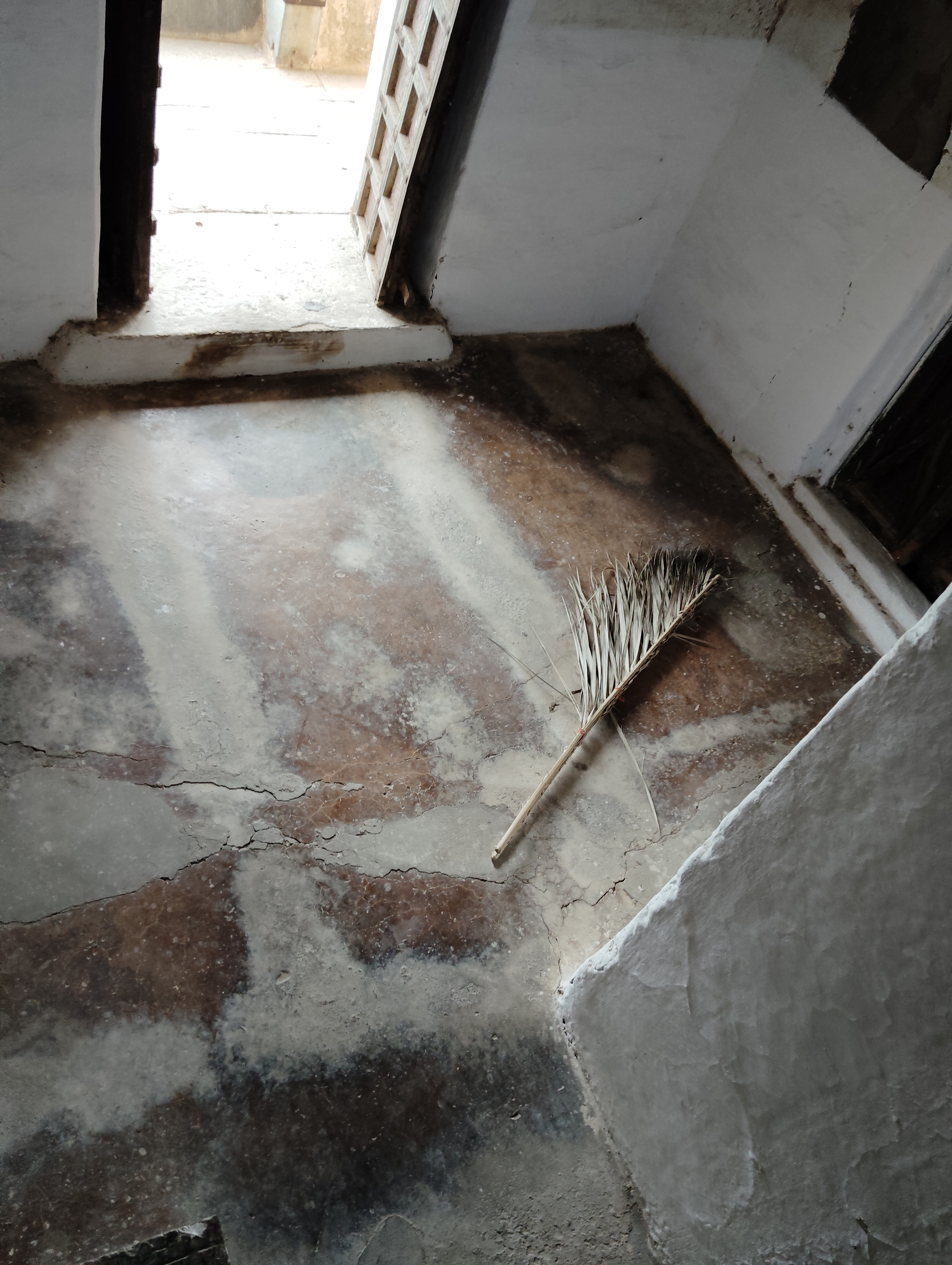
View of the Juna Mahal

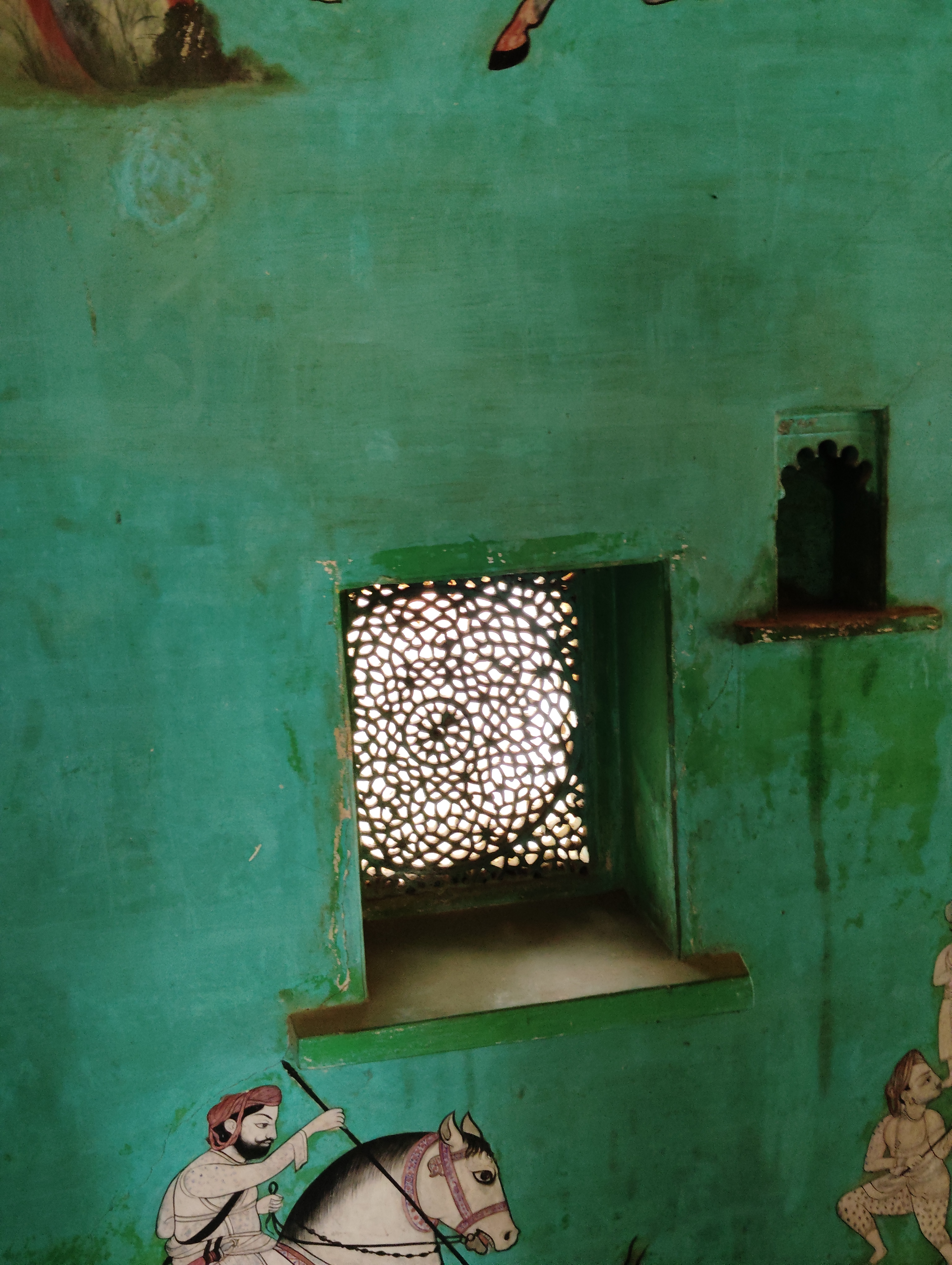
View of the Juna Mahal

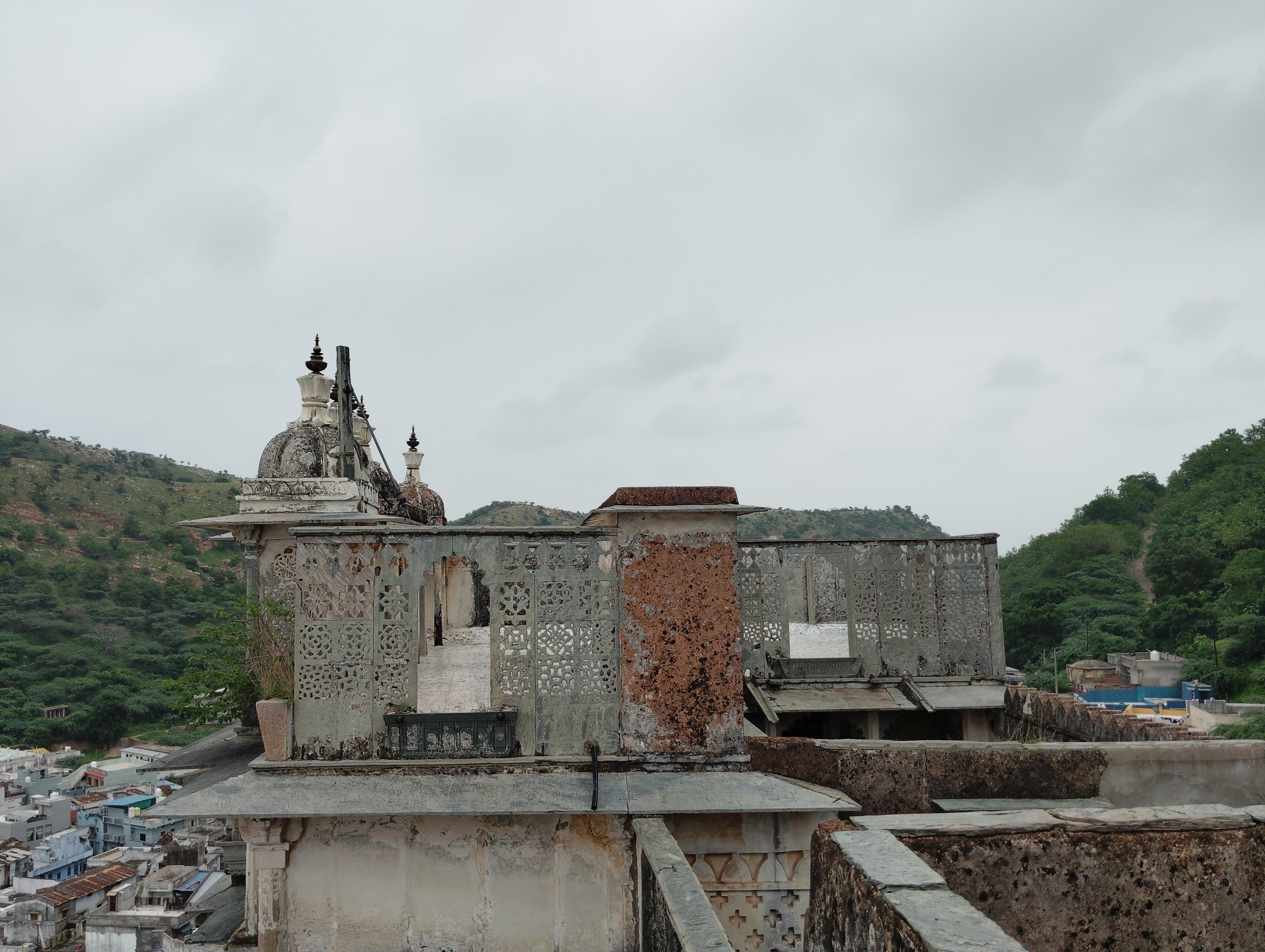
View of the Juna Mahal

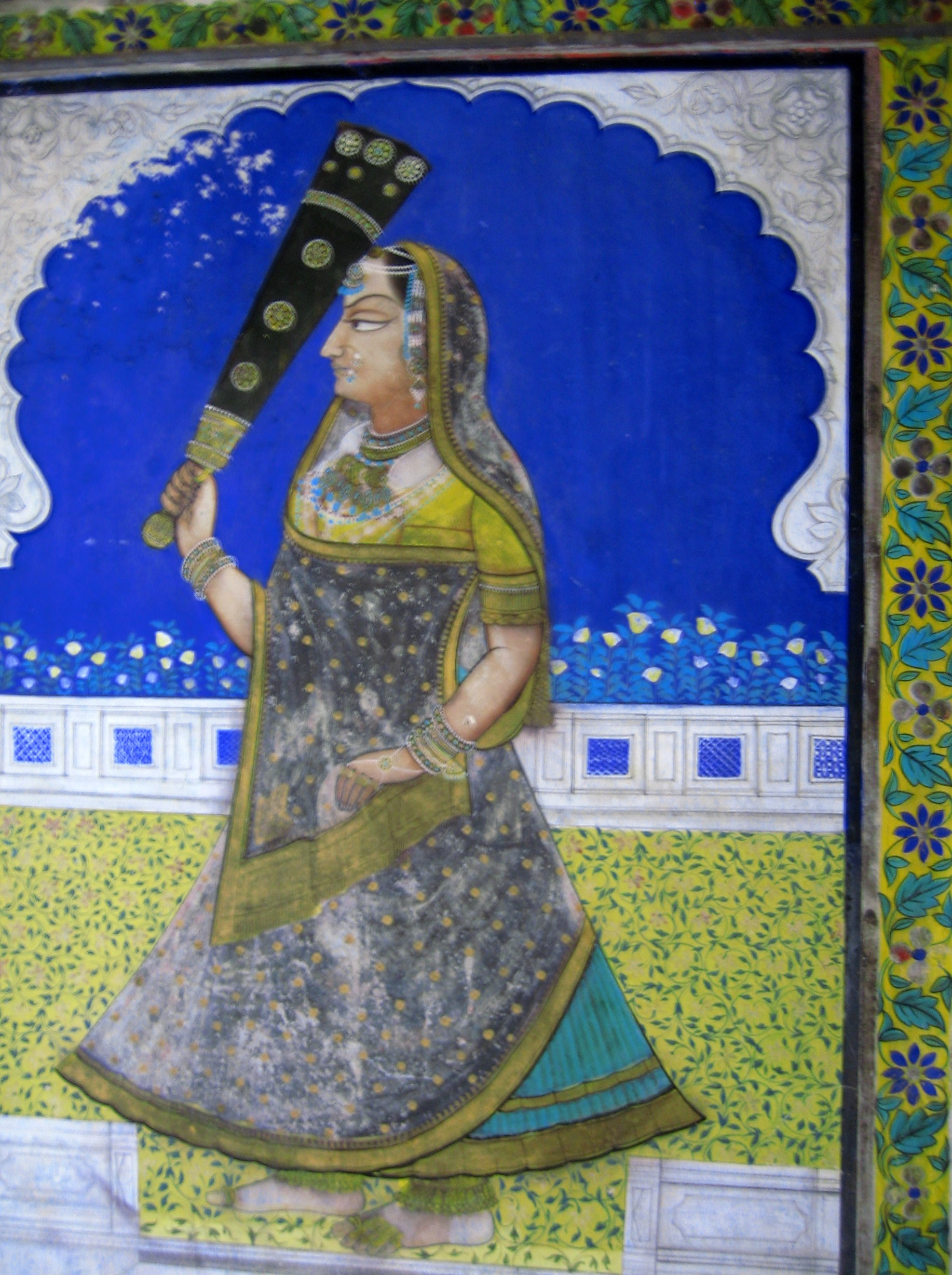
Painting on a wall of the Juna Mahal

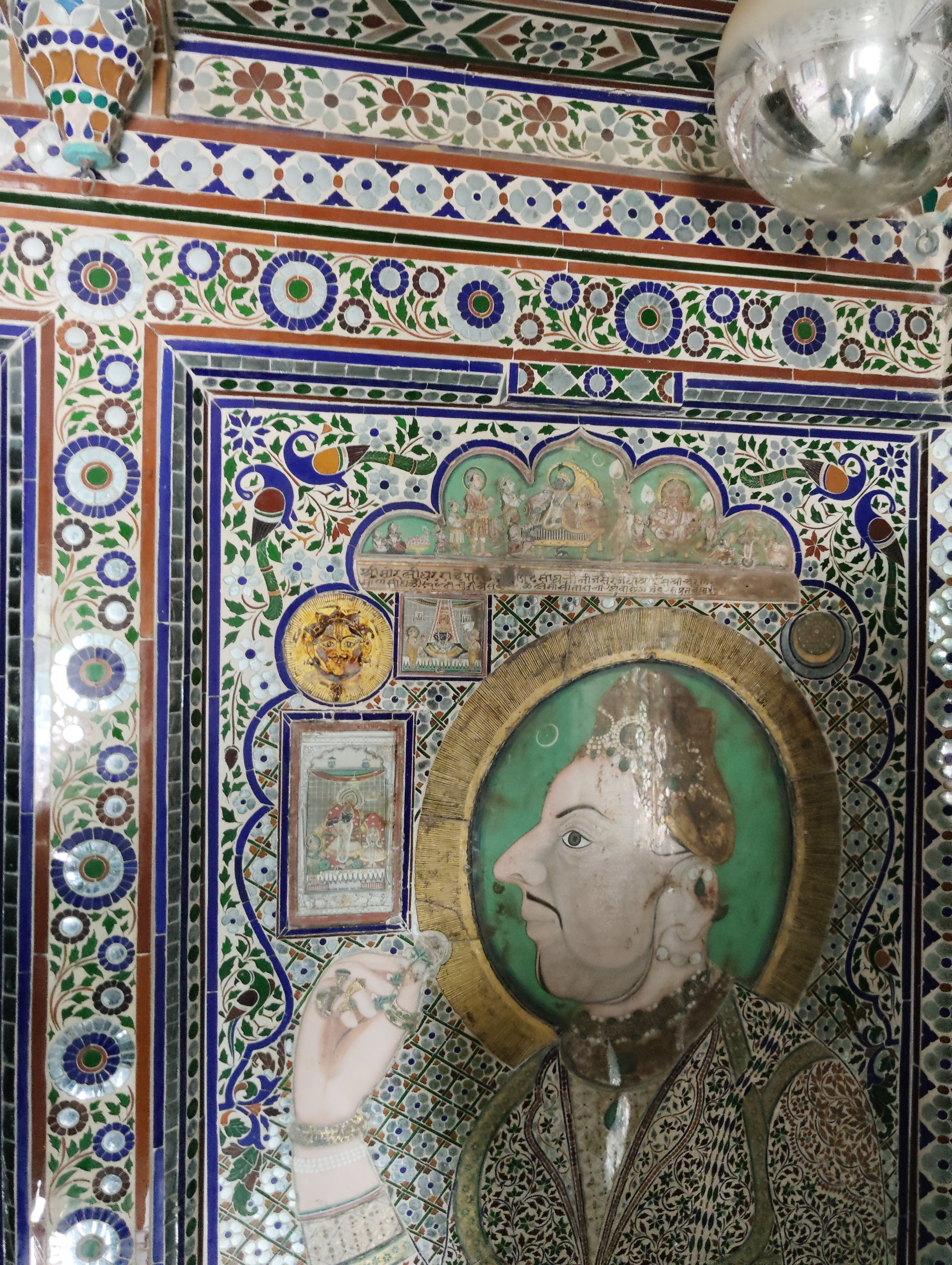
Painting on a wall of the Juna Mahal

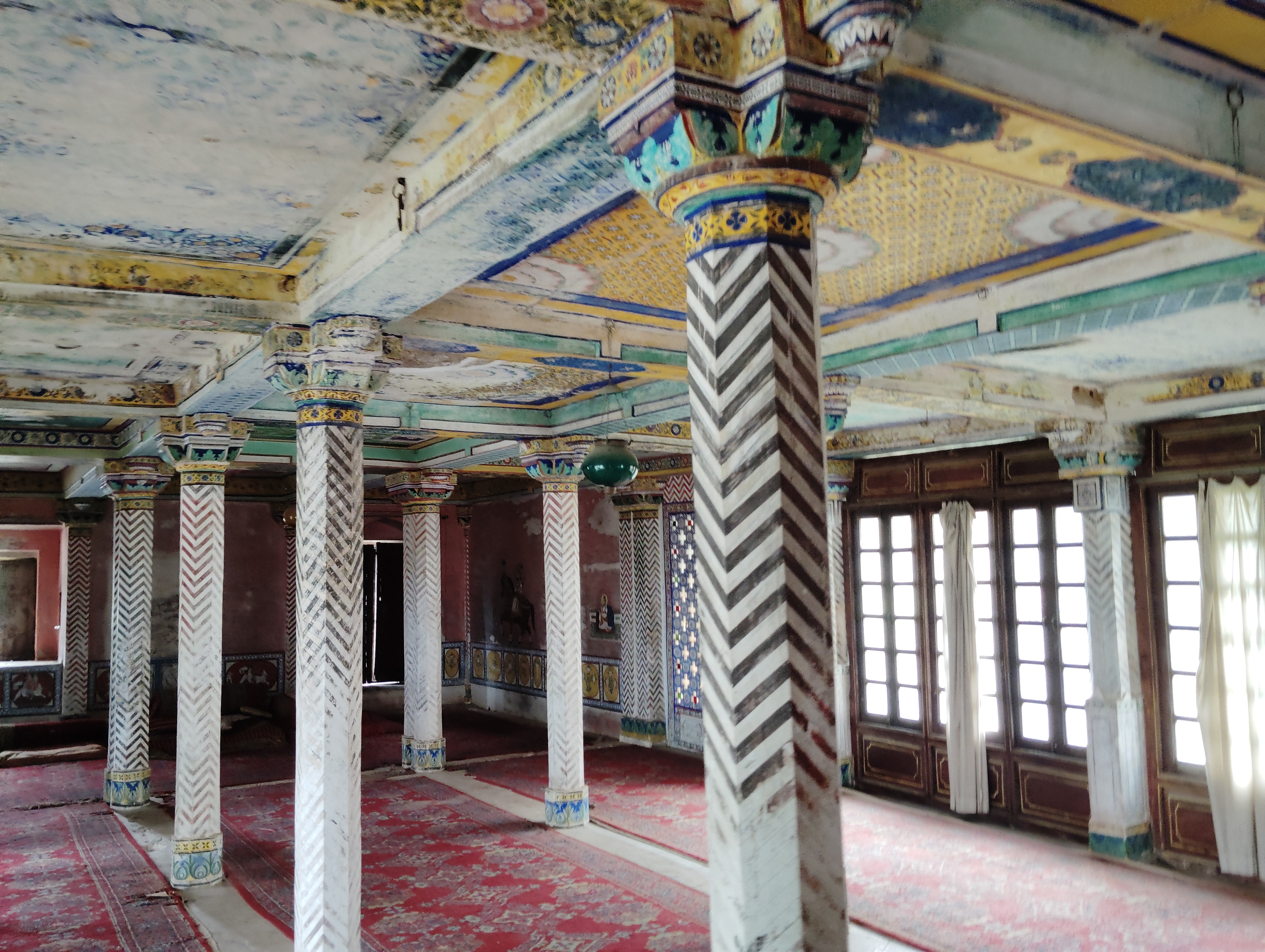
View of the Juna Mahal

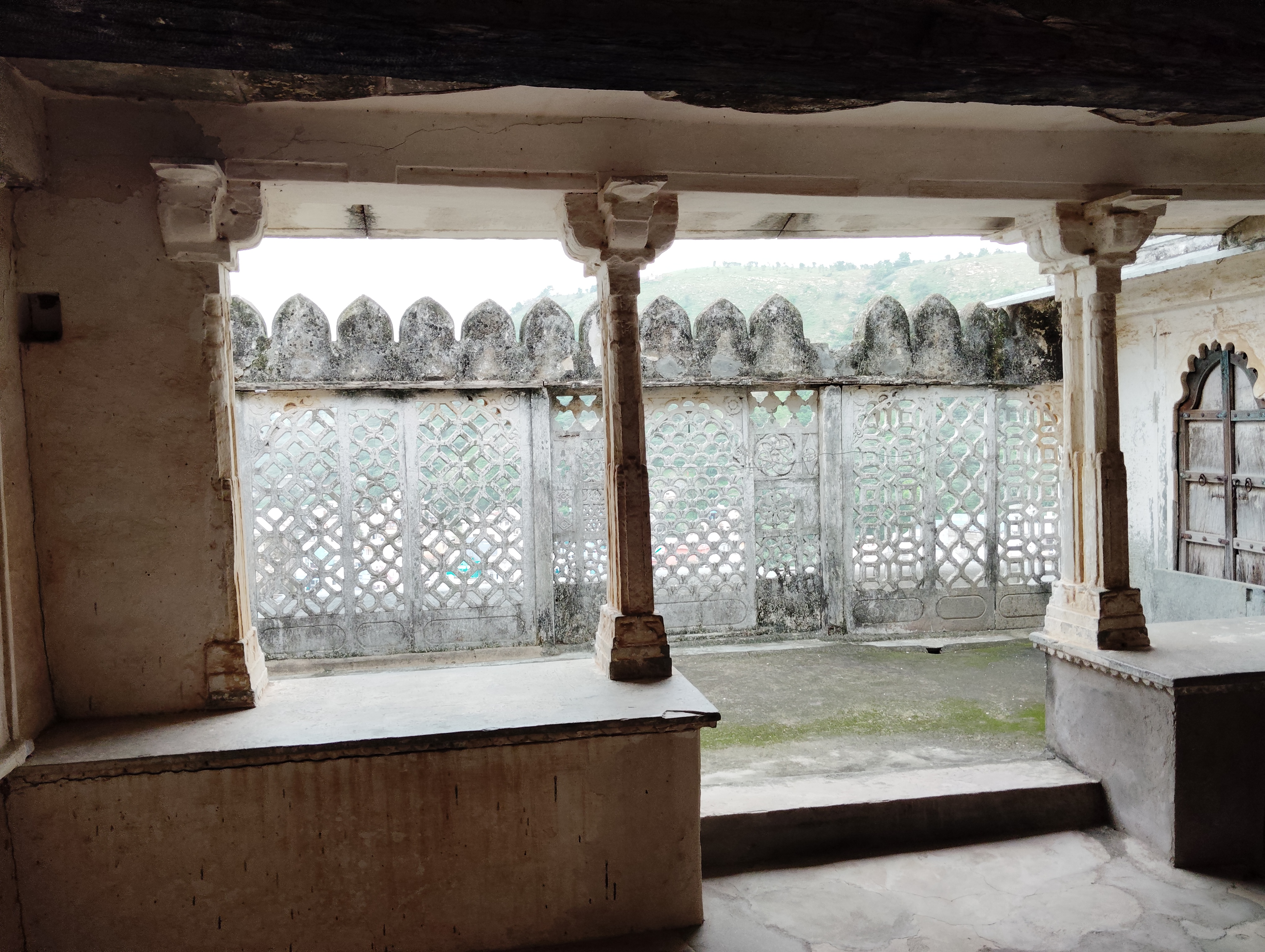
View of the Juna Mahal
