= Monument to the Great Fire of London =

Monument in London

Coordinates: 51°30′37″N 0°05′09″W

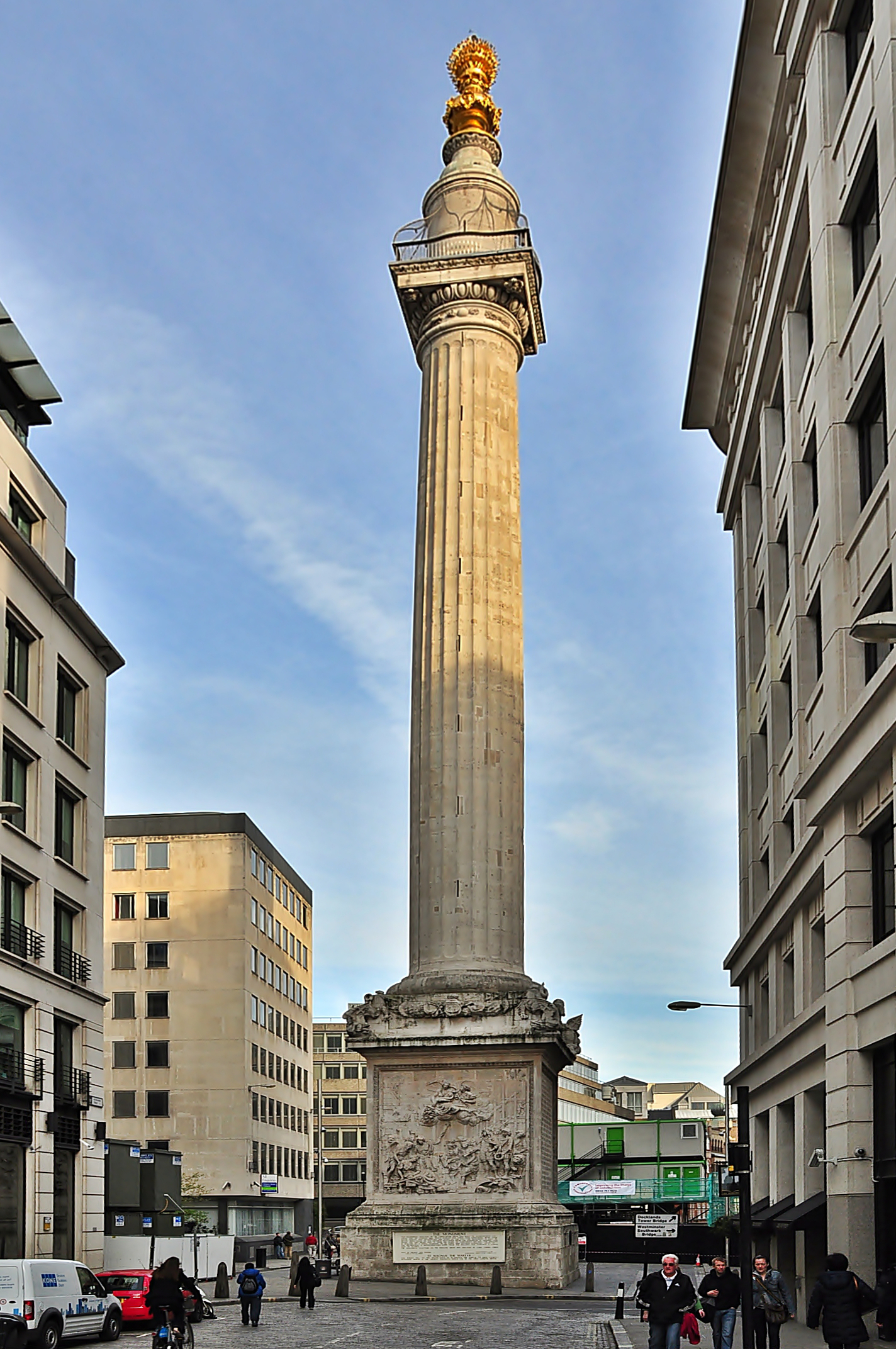
View of the Monument, designed by Robert Hooke

The Monument to the Great Fire of London, more commonly known simply as the Monument, is a fluted Doric column in London, England, situated near the northern end of London Bridge. Commemorating the Great Fire of London, it stands at the junction of Monument Street and Fish Street Hill, 202 feet (61.6 m) in height and 202 feet west of the spot in Pudding Lane where the Great Fire started on 2 September 1666. Constructed between 1671 and 1677, it was built on the site of St Margaret, New Fish Street, the first church to be destroyed by the Great Fire. It is Grade I-listed and is a scheduled monument. Another monument, the Golden Boy of Pye Corner, marks the point near Smithfield where the fire was stopped.

== Description ==
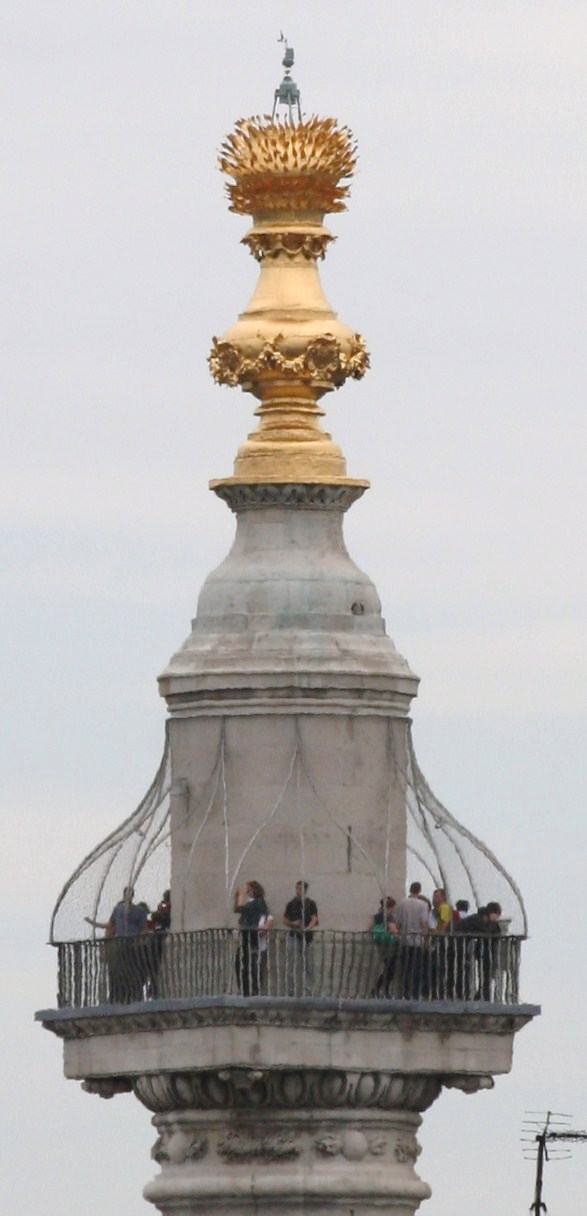
Viewing platform at the top of the Monument

The Monument comprises a Doric column built of Portland stone topped with a gilded urn of fire. It was designed by Robert Hooke. Its height marks its distance from the site of the shop of Thomas Farriner (or Farynor), the king's baker, where the blaze began.

The viewing platform near the top of the Monument is reached by a narrow winding staircase of 311 steps. (Note: There are 311 steps from ground level to the viewing platform; 345 from the basement.) A mesh cage was added in the mid-19th century to prevent people jumping to the ground, after six people died by suicide there between 1788 and 1842.

Three sides of the base carry inscriptions in Latin. The one on the south side describes actions taken by King Charles II following the fire. The inscription on the east side describes how the Monument was started and brought to perfection, and under which mayors. Inscriptions on the north side describe how the fire started, how much damage it caused, and how it was eventually extinguished. The Latin words "Sed Furor Papisticus Qui Tamdiu Patravit Nondum Restingvitur" (transl. "but Popish frenzy, which wrought such horrors, is not yet quenched") were added to the end of the inscription on the orders of the Court of Aldermen in 1681 during the foment of the Popish Plot. Text on the east side originally falsely blamed Roman Catholics for the fire ("burning of this protestant city, begun and carried on by the treachery and malice of the popish faction"), which prompted Alexander Pope (himself a Catholic) to say of the area:

Where London's column, pointing at the skies,
Like a tall bully, lifts the head, and lies.

— Moral Essays, Epistle iii. line 339 (1733–1734).

The words blaming Catholics were chiselled out with Catholic Emancipation in 1830. The west side of the base displays a relief sculpture by Caius Gabriel Cibber, representing in allegorical form the destruction and restoration of the City of London. The latter is personified by a languishing woman sustained by Time and Providentia; Charles II, assisted by his brother James, directs the reconstruction works surrounded by female allegories of Architecture, Imagination, Freedom, Justice and Fortitude; Envy lies powerlessly at the bottom of the scene, while Plenty and Peace watch benevolently from above. It gives its name to the nearby London Underground station, Monument.

== History ==
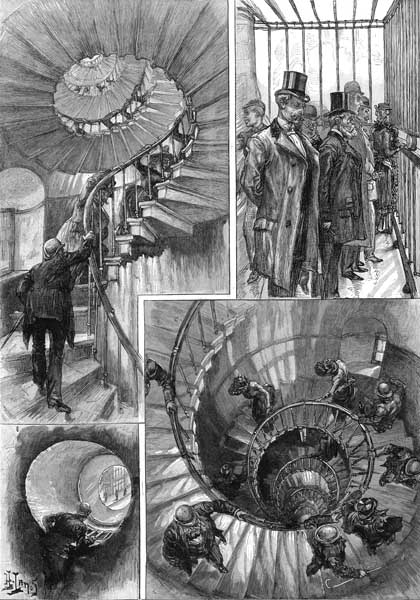
Views published in The Graphic, 1891.

The first Rebuilding Act, passed in 1669, stipulated that "the better to preserve the memory of this dreadful visitation", a column of either brass or stone should be set up on Fish Street Hill, on or near the site of Farynor's bakery, where the fire began. Christopher Wren, as surveyor-general of the King's Works, was asked to submit a design. Robert Hooke, then working as an architect for Wren, developed the design. It is impossible to know the extent of the collaboration between Hooke and Wren, but Hooke's drawings of possible designs for the column still exist, with Wren's signature on them indicating his approval of the drawings rather than their authorship. It was not until 1671 that the City Council approved the design, and it took six years to complete the 202 feet (61.6 m) column. It was two more years before the inscription (which had been left to Wren – or to Wren's choice – to decide upon) was set in place. "Commemorating – with a brazen disregard for the truth – the fact that 'London rises again ... three short years complete that which was considered the work of ages.'"

Hooke's surviving drawings show that several versions of the monument were submitted for consideration: a plain obelisk, a column garnished with tongues of fire, and the fluted Doric column that was eventually chosen. The real contention came with the problem of what type of ornament to have at the top. Initially, Wren favoured a statue of a phoenix with outstretched wings rising from the ashes, but as the column neared completion he decided instead on a 15 ft (4.6 m) statue either of Charles II, or a sword-wielding female to represent a triumphant London; the cost of either being estimated at £1,050. (Note: About £218,000 in 2025;) Charles himself disliked the idea of his statue atop the monument and instead preferred a simple copper-gilded ball "with flames sprouting from the top", costing a little over £325, but ultimately it was the design of a flaming gilt-bronze urn suggested by Robert Hooke that was chosen.

The total cost of the monument was £13,450 11s 9d., (Note: About £2,559,000 in 2025) of which £11,300 was paid to the mason-contractor Joshua Marshall. (Joshua Marshall was Master of the Masons' Company in 1670.)

The Edinburgh-born writer James Boswell visited the Monument in 1763 to climb the 311 steps to what was then the highest viewpoint in London. Halfway up, he suffered a panic attack, but persevered and made it to the top, where he found it "horrid to be so monstrous a way up in the air, so far above London and all its spires". In 1913 two suffragettes unfurled a flag and dropped leaflets from the monument. One of these was Gertrude Metcalfe-Shaw.

The Monument closed in July 2007 for an 18-month, £4.5 million refurbishment project and re-opened in February 2009.

Between 1 and 2 October 2011, a Live Music Sculpture created especially for the Monument by British composer Samuel Bordoli was performed 18 times during the weekend. This was the first occasion that music had ever been heard inside the structure and effectively transformed Hooke's design into a gigantic reverberating musical instrument.

== As a scientific instrument ==
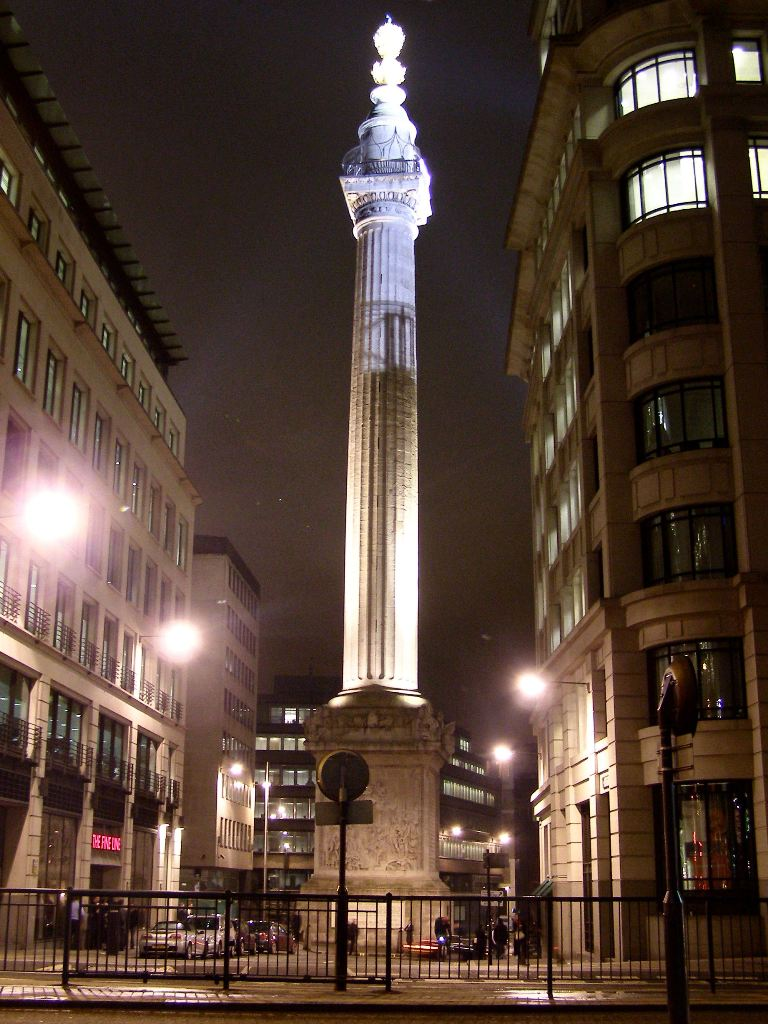
The Monument at night

Wren and Hooke built the monument to double-up as a scientific instrument. It has a central shaft meant for use as a zenith telescope and for use in gravity and pendulum experiments that connects to an underground laboratory for observers to work (accessible through a hatch in the floor of the present-day ticket booth). Vibrations from heavy traffic on Fish Street Hill rendered the experimental conditions unsuitable.

At the top of the monument, a hinged lid in the urn covers the opening to the shaft. The steps in the shaft of the tower are all 6 inches (150 mm) high, allowing them to be used for barometric pressure studies.

In a study published in 2020, researchers from Queen Mary University of London used the shaft of the monument stairwell to measure deformation in a hanging wire. By twisting and untwisting a wire hanging down the shaft of the stairwell, they were able to detect deformation at less than 9 parts per billion – equivalent to a one-degree twist over the length of the 160-foot (50 m) wire.

== Panoramic camera system ==
During the 2007–2009 refurbishment, a 360-degree panoramic camera was installed on top of the Monument.

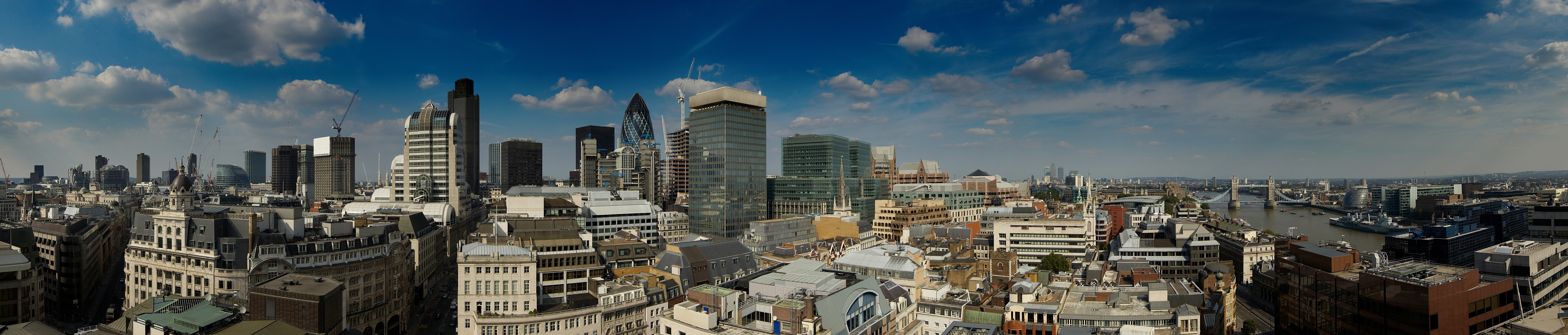
Panorama of London taken from the top of the Monument

== Monument Square ==
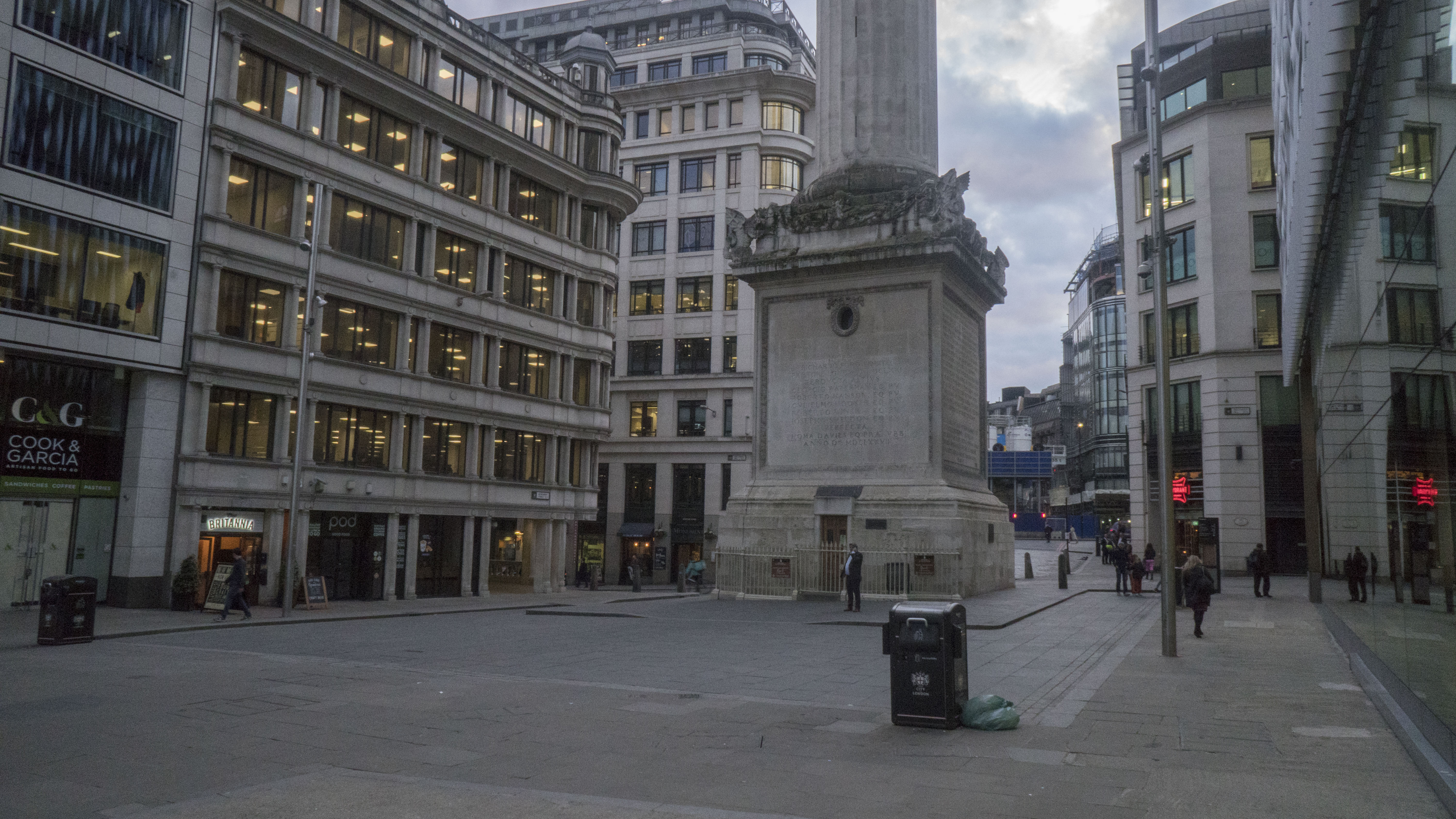
Monument Square, London

The Monument stands in Monument Square, formerly known as Monument Yard which was merged into Monument Street in 1911, created as part of the pedestrianisation of Monument Street in 2006 in a £790,000 street improvement scheme. It sits on the east side of Fish Street Hill, and extends to Pudding Lane. A glass pavilion, designed by Bere Architects, was unveiled on 31 January 2007.

== In fiction ==
- William Godwin, in his novel Deloraine (1833), suggests that, like "the man we are told of, who climbed over the rails at the top of the Monument of London, and clung to them for a while on the outside, there was not room for repentance", meaning that there was no way for the hero, who has just killed his rival, to go back (147).
- Charles Dickens, in his novel Martin Chuzzlewit, published in 1844, describes the Monument thus:
  if the day were bright, you observed upon the house-tops, stretching far away, a long dark path; the shadow of the Monument; and turning round, the tall original was close beside you, with every hair erect upon his golden head, as if the doings of the city frightened him.
- The Monument is a prominent setting in The System of the World, the third book in Neal Stephenson's Baroque Cycle.
- George, the hero of Charlie Fletcher's children's book Stoneheart, has a fight at the top of the Monument with a raven and a gargoyle.
- The Monument's viewing platform features in the 1970 film The Man Who Haunted Himself where Roger Moore's character, Harold Pelham, meets a company rival for a secret meeting prior to a company takeover.

== Gallery ==
Monument to the Great Fire of London
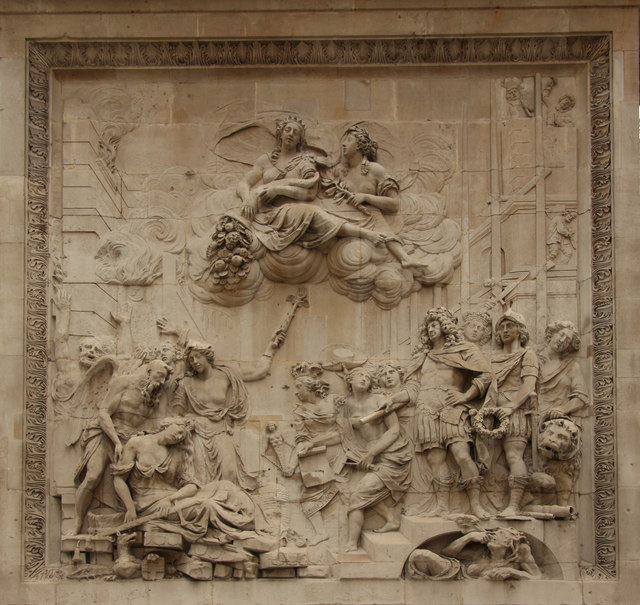
The relief on the Monument's base by Caius Gabriel Cibber

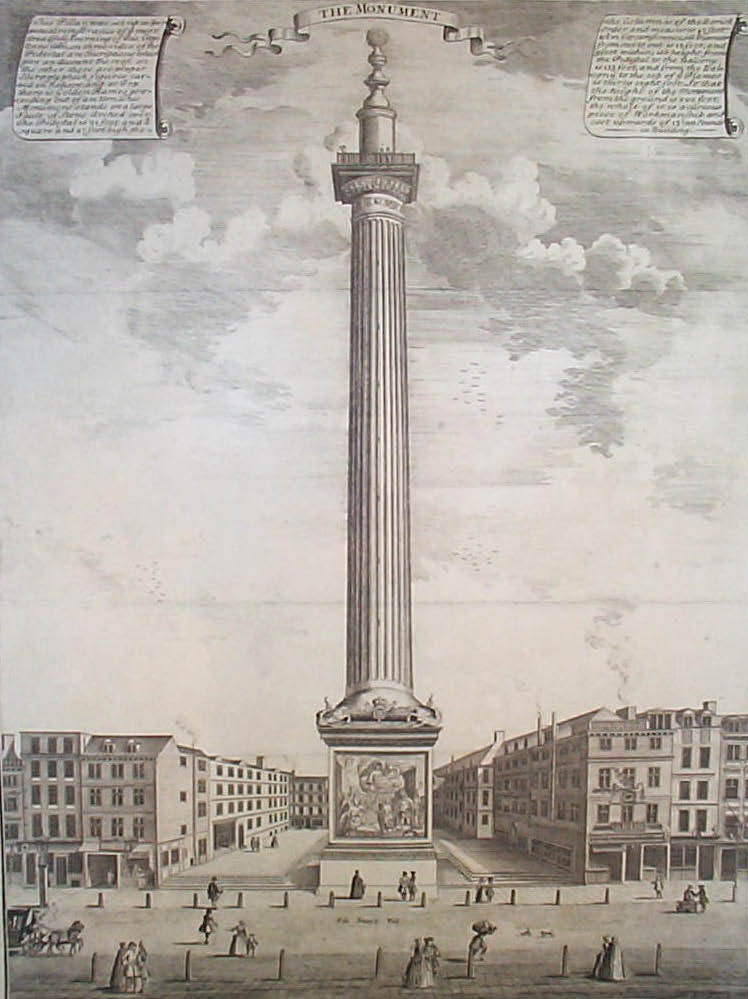
The Monument depicted in a picture by Sutton Nicholls, c. 1753

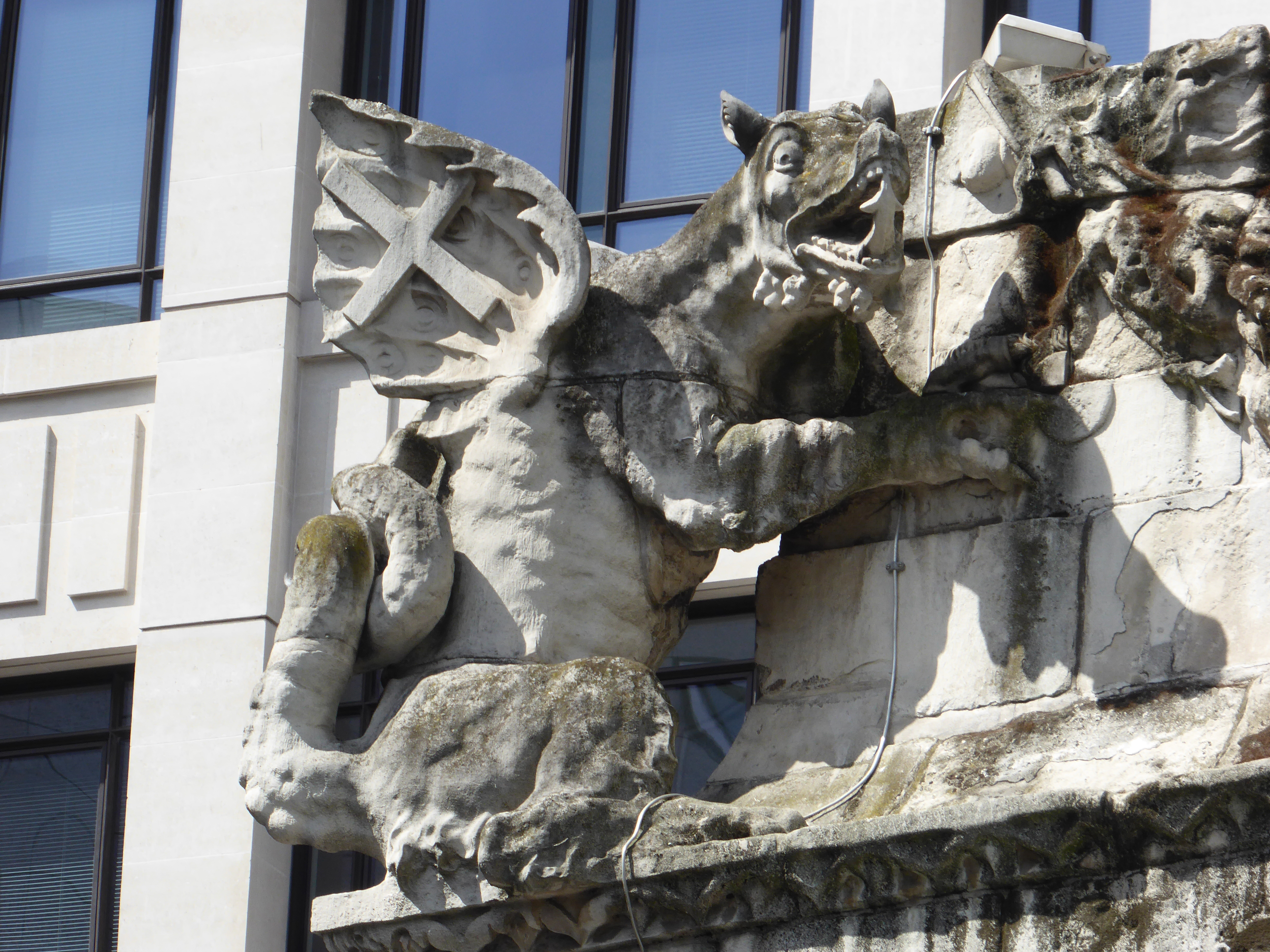
Dragon sculpture on the side of the Monument

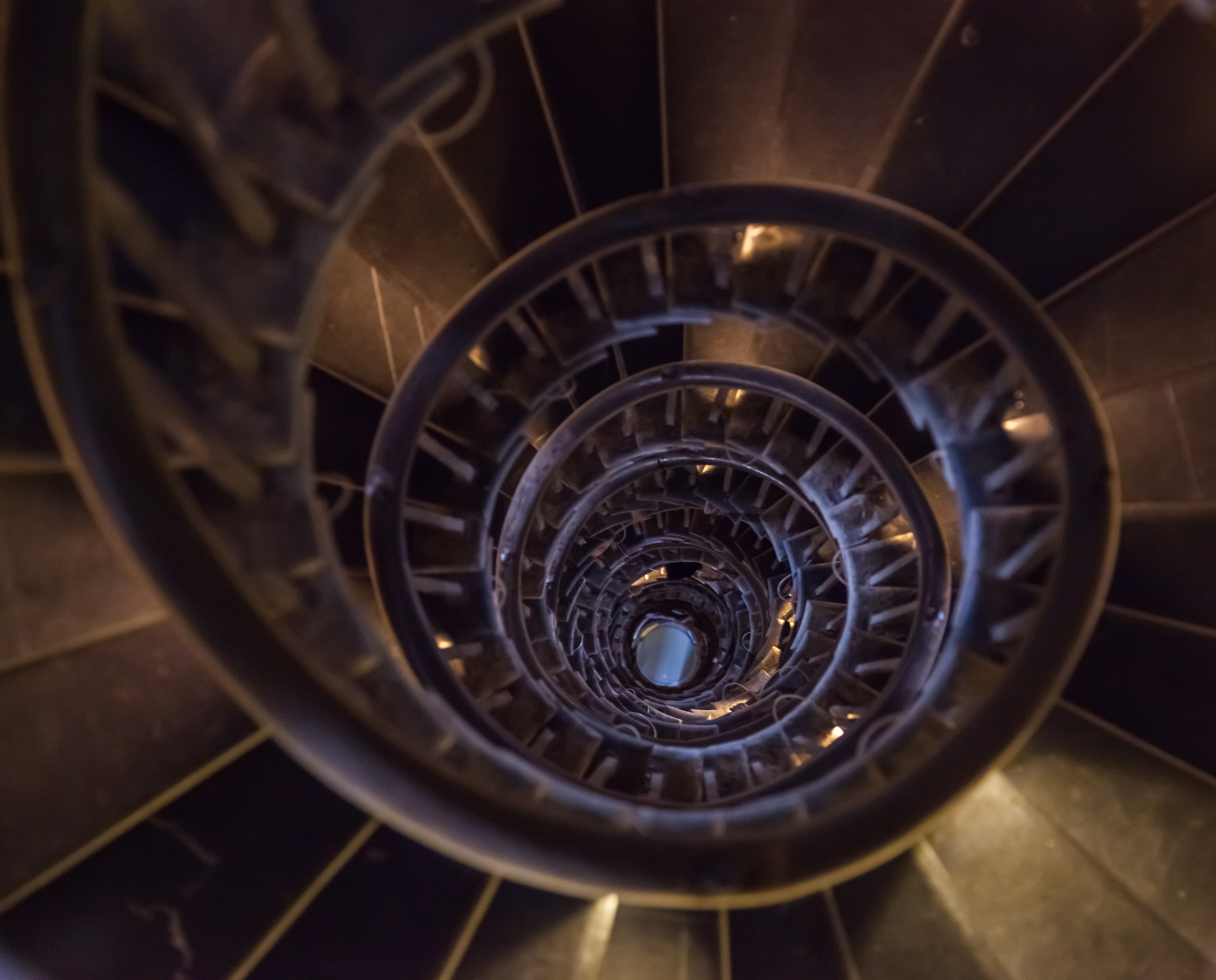
View down the interior staircase

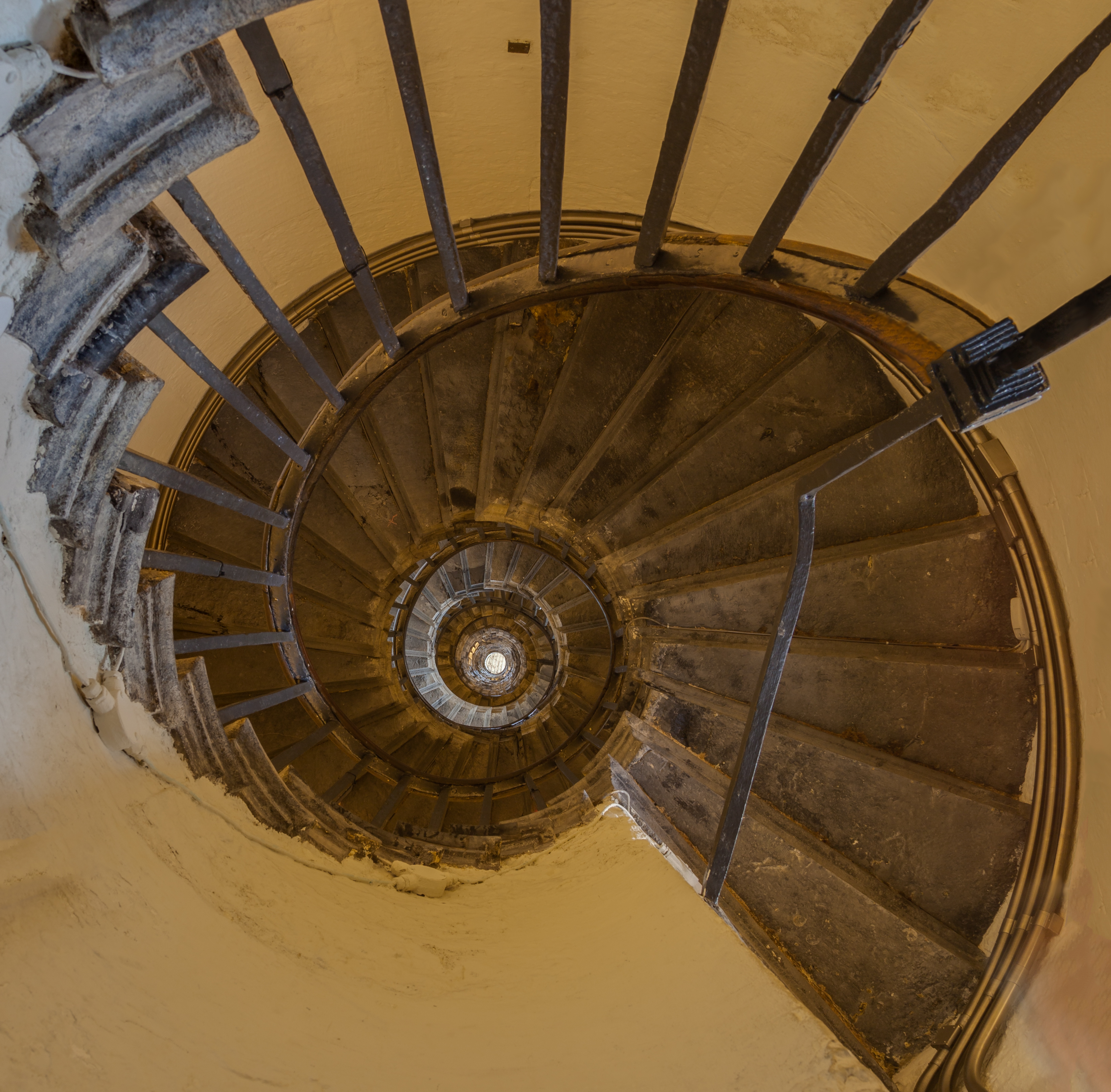
View up the interior staircase

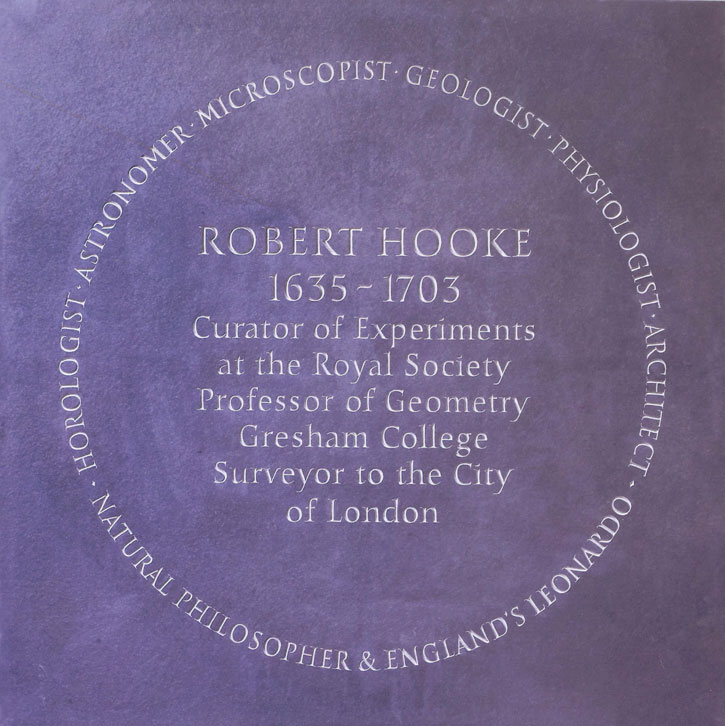
Stone recognising the work of Robert Hooke (2007)

== See also ==
- History of London
