= Karen Knorr =

German-born American/ British photographer (born 1954)

Karen Knorr HonFRPS (born 1954) is a German-born American photographer who lives in London. In 2018 she received an Honorary Fellowship of the Royal Photographic Society. She is on the steering committee of Fast Forward Women in Photography at University for the Creative Arts, Farnham, Surrey, UK.

Karen Knorr’s work has been exhibited around the world, including at Tate; the Museum of Fine Arts, Houston, Texas; Multimedia Art Museum, Moscow; Seoul Museum of Art, Korea; and the Minsheng Art Museum, Shanghai. Her work is in the collections of Tate, Victoria & Albert Museum and the United Kingdom Government Art Collection, England; Musée d’Art Moderne de Paris and Centre Pompidou, France; Moderna Museet, Stockholm; San Francisco Museum of Modern Art, California; the Museum of Fine Arts, Houston; and the National Museum of Modern Art, Kyoto, Japan, among others.

== Early life and education ==
Knorr was born in Frankfurt and raised in the 1960s in San Juan, Puerto Rico. In the 1970s, she moved to Great Britain where she has lived ever since. Knorr is a graduate of the Polytechnic of Central London (now the University of Westminster), and has an MA from the University of Derby.

== Photographic work ==
Knorr's work explores Western cultural traditions, mainly British society, with widely ranging topics, from lifestyle to animals. She is interested in conceptual art, visual culture, feminism, and animal studies, and her art maintains connections with these topics.

Between 1979 and 1981 Knorr produced Belgravia, a series of black and white photographs each accompanied by a short text, typically critical to the British class system of the time. Subsequently, she produced Gentlemen (1981–1983), a series consisting of photographs of gentlemen's clubs and texts taken from parliamentary speeches and news reports. In 1986, the series Connoisseurs was made in color. The series incorporates staged events into English architectural interiors. Between 1994 and 2004, Knorr photographed fine art academies throughout Europe, which resulted in the series Academies.

In 2008, she traveled to Rajasthan and took a large series of photographs, predominantly showing Indian interiors, often with animals from Indian folklore inside. She subsequently became a frequent traveller to India, visiting the country 15 times between 2008 and 2014. She mentioned that most of the buildings in India were never photographed, and they are not less interesting than common tourist attractions.

== Academic career ==
She is Emerita Professor of Photography at the University for the Creative Arts.

== Publications ==
=== Publications by Knorr ===
- Marks of Distinction. London: Thames and Hudson, 1991. ISBN 978-0500541654. With an introduction by Patrick Mauries, "The Outsider"; and an interview by Antonio Guzman with Knorr.
- Karen Knorr. 2001. By Antonio Guzman.
- Genii Loci: the Photographic Work of Karen Knorr. London: Black Dog, 2002. ISBN 978-1901033380. Photographs, and texts by Antonio Guzman, "Rewind and fast-forward: photography, allegory and palimpsest"; Rebecca Comay and Knorr, "Natural histories"; and David Campany, "Museum and medium: the time of Karen Knorr's imagery". An overview of Knorr's work from the 1990s to 2002.
- Fables. Trézélan: Filigranes, 2008. ISBN 978-2-35046-135-9. With texts by Lucy Soutter and Nathalie Leleu. Text in French and English.
- Karen Knorr: El Ojo Que Ves, Madrid: La Fábrica; Córdoba, Spain: University of Córdoba, 2011. ISBN 978-84-9927-105-7. Text in Spanish, English and French. With a preface by Quentin Bajac.
- India Song. Skira, 2014. ISBN 978-8857222356. Edited by Falvo Rosa Maria. With a preface by William Dalrymple, an essay by Christopher Pinney, and an interview by Rosa Maria Falvo.
- Belgravia. London: Stanley Barker, 2015. ISBN 978-0956992246. Edition of 1000 copies.
- Gentlemen. London: Stanley Barker, 2016. ISBN 978-0956992291.
- Questions (After Brecht). London: Gost, 2020. ISBN 978-1-910401-48-4. With an interview by Campany.
- Country Life. London: Stanley Barker, 2024. ISBN 978-1913288679.
- Connoisseurs & Academies. Germany: Kehrer, 2024. ISBN 978-3-96900-157-8.
- Fables and Other Stories. France: Filigranes Éditions, 2025. ISBN 978-2-35046-639-2.

=== Co-Authored Publications ===
- Punks. With Olivier Richon. London: Gost, 2013. With an essay by Knorr and Richon. ISBN 978-0-9574272-6-6. Edition of 1000 copies.
- U.S. Route 1 (After Berenice Abbott). With Anna Fox. London: Trolley Books, 2025. ISBN 978-1-907112-75-1.

=== Publications with contributions by Knorr ===
- Lacoue-Labarthe, Philippe, Patrick Roegiers and Christopher Meatyard. "Theatre des Realites". Paris: Metz Pour la Photography (1986). 28-31, 108-109.
- From Talbot to Fox. 150 Years of British Social Photography. London: James Hyman, 2012. Edition of 50 copies. An overview of British social photography published to accompany an exhibition by James Hyman Photography at The AIPAD Photography Show New York in 2011. Includes photographs by William Henry Fox Talbot, David Octavius Hill & Robert Adamson, Roger Fenton, Horatio Ross, Julia Margaret Cameron, Thomas Annan, Bill Brandt, Bert Hardy, Roger Mayne, Cecil Beaton, Caroline Coon, Paul Reas, Jem Southam, Ken Grant, Karen Knorr, Anna Fox and others.
- The 80s: Photographing Britain, Yasufumi Nakamori, Helen Little & Jasmine Kaur Chohan (eds.), Tate Publishing, London, 2024. Photographers include Don McCullin, Martin Parr, Ingrid Pollard, Sunil Gupta, Wolfgang Tillmans, Keith Arnatt, Vanley Burke, Sirkka-Liisa Kontinnen, Marketa Luskacova, Joy Gregory, Paul Graham, Ajamu X, and many more key figures.
- Aviary: The Bird in Contemporary Photography, Edited by Danaé Panchaud and William A. Ewing, Thames and Hudson, London, UK, 2025. Includes contemporary photographers such as Leila Jeffreys, Sarah Moon, Roger Ballen, Charles Fréger, Vik Muniz, Tim Flach, Viviane Sassen, and Nadav Kander, among many others.

== Solo Exhibitions (selected) ==
- Dreams, Chobi Mela VI International Photography Festival, Dhaka, Bangladesh, 2011
- BP Spotlight: Karen Knorr, Belgravia 1979–81 and Gentlemen 1981–83, Tate Britain, London, 2014/2015
- Karen Knorr & Anna Fox: Another Way of Telling, Three Shadows Photography Art Centre, China, 2018/2019
- Karen Knorr, Les filles du calvaire, France, 2023
- Karen Knorr Intersections, Sundaram Tagore Gallery, New York, USA, 2024
- Karen Knorr and Anna Fox: U.S. Route 1 (After Berenice Abbott), Les Rencontres d’Arles, Palais de l’Archevêché, France, 2025
- Karen Knorr: Fables and Other Stories, Centre d'art contemporain de la Matmut, Saint-Pierre-de-Varengeville, France, 2025
- Karen Knorr Inhabits the Castle, Château d’Azay-le-Rideau, France, 2026
- Karen Knorr and Olivier Richon: No Future, Château d’Oiron, France, 2026

== Group Exhibitions (selected) ==
- Signs of a Struggle: Photography in the Wake of Postmodernism, Victoria and Albert Museum, London, 2011
- Seduced by Art: Photography Past and Present, The National Gallery, London, 2012/2013
- The Unbearable Lightness: The 1980s, Centre Pompidou, Paris, France, 2016
- Masculinities: Liberation through Photography, Barbican, London, 2020
- The 80s: Photographing Britain, Tate Britain, 2024/2025
- This is Britain: Photographs from the 1970s and 1980s, National Gallery of Art, Washington D.C., USA, 2023
- Unruly – The body in Punk, ARoS Aarhus Kunstmuseum, Denmark, 2026

== Awards ==
- 2010: Pilar Citoler International Biennial Prize for Contemporary Photography
- 2018: Honorary Fellowship of the Royal Photographic Society, Bath

== Collections (selected) ==
Knorr's work is held in the following permanent collections:

- Arts Council Collection, UK: prints from the series Gentlemen (1981–1983) and Punks (1977, co-authored with Olivier Richon).
- Centre Pompidou, France: 26 prints from the series Belgravia (1979–1981), 4 prints from the series Connoisseurs (1986–1990), and 1 print from the series Academies (1994–2005).
- San Francisco Museum of Modern Art, USA: The Movement of the Soul from the series Academies (1995).
- Musée d'Art Moderne de la Ville de Paris, France: prints from the series Gentlemen (1981–1983).
- Museum of Art & Photography (MAP), Bangalore, India: 3 prints from the series India Song (2010–2023)
- Museum of Fine Arts, Houston, USA: 1 print from the series Belgravia (1979–1981), and 2 prints from the series Connoisseurs (1986–1990).
- National Gallery of Art, Washington D.C., USA: 2 prints from the series Gentlemen (1981–1983) and 2 prints from the series Country Life (1983–1985).
- National Museum of Modern Art, Kyoto (MOMAK), Japan: 2 prints from the series Connoisseurs (1986–1990).
- Tate, London: 16 prints from the series Punks (1977, co-authored with Olivier Richon), 26 prints from the series Belgravia (1979–1981), and 26 prints from the series Gentlemen (1981–1983).
- Victoria & Albert Museum, London: prints from Academies (1994–2005), Connoisseurs (1986–1990), The Virtues and The Delights (1992–1994), Gentlemen (1981–1983), and Swiss Account (co-authored with Andrew Cameron and Olivier Richon, circa 1980s).
