= Gertrude Metcalfe-Shaw =

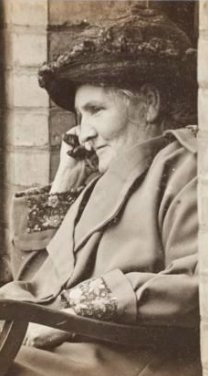
- clandestine photograph taken of her in prison
- Born: Gertrude Metcalfe; 1864
- Died: Unknown
- Known for: suffragette and caravanner
- Spouse: Edward Shaw
- Children: four

Gertrude E. Metcalfe-Shaw (born 1864) was a British Suffragette and writer. She was twice arrested and she was awarded a Hunger Strike Medal. She later set out on a caravan journey in the 1920s to cross America from California to New York. Her account was published.

== Life ==
She was born in 1864 and she came to notice after she joined the Women's Social and Political Union led by Emmeline Pankhurst. In 1913 she was one of two suffragettes who unfurled a flag at the top of the Monument to the Great Fire of London and they then dropped leaflets to those below. She was arrested and sent to Holloway later that year after she broke a window in the Police headquarters of Scotland Yard. She could have avoided prison by paying a fine but she opted to go to prison. She told the court that she had been robbed of £100 by the government as she had no vote so it was robbery to tax her. While she was in prison it is thought that the clandestine photograph of her was taken by the authorities. Photos of known suffragettes were distributed to the police, museums and art galleries. She was arrested and sentenced again in 1914. She had been released after going on hunger strike and she was awarded a medal recording her hunger strike and the two periods of imprisonment.

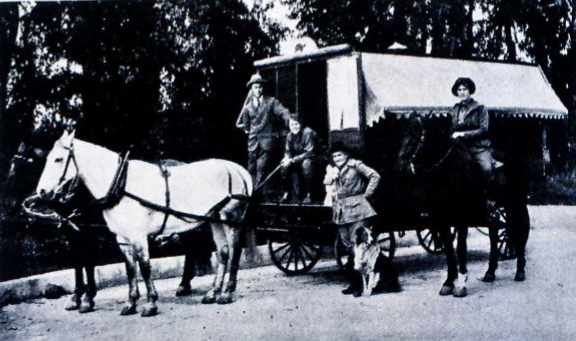
Gertrude Metcalfe-Shaw and her family setting out in their caravan to cross America to New York

She moved to Canada during the war and by 1918 she was living in Michigan. In 1926 she published a book, English Caravanners in the Wild West: The Old Pioneers' Trail, recounting a journey that she had made in a horse-drawn caravan across America.

In October 2024 her WSPU medal and suffragette story featured on the BBC programme Antiques Roadshow. The experts valued her medal and her family's mementoes at £25,000 to £30,000.

== Private life ==
She married Edward Shaw and they had four children. Her sister-in-law was the painter, Helen Lavinia Cochrane who died in 1946. Her portrait of Metcalfe-Shaw is extant.
