= Anna Fox =

British documentary photographer

- Born: 1961 (age 64–65)
- Education: West Surrey College of Art and Design, Farnham, Surrey
- Occupation: Documentary photographer
- Website: www.annafox.co.uk

Anna Fox (born 1961) is a British documentary photographer, known for a "combative, highly charged use of flash and colour". In 2019 she was awarded an Honorary Fellowship of the Royal Photographic Society.

== Career and work ==
Fox completed her degree in Photography at West Surrey College of Art and Design in Farnham, Surrey in 1986 under tutors Martin Parr, Paul Graham and Karen Knorr.

Fox first came to attention with her 1988 documentary study of London office life on the mid-1980s, Work Stations: Office Life in London. She is perhaps best known for her Zwarte Piet series made between 1993 and 1998, published as the book Zwarte Piet, which documents 'black face' folk culture traditions in the Netherlands. Between 2001 and 2003 she published four monographs in her "Made in" series: Made in Milton Keynes, Made in Kansas, Made in Gothenburg and Made in Florence. From 2009, Fox photographed for two years at Butlins in Bognor Regis for her book Resort 1 - Butlin's Bognor Regis.

She currently works as head of photography at University for the Creative Arts in Farnham. A retrospective 300-page book Photographs 1983-2007 by Val Williams was published by Photoworks in 2007. In November 2009 Fox was shortlisted for the 2010 Deutsche Börse Photography Prize, held at the Photographers Gallery, London, and the 2012 Pilar Citoler Prize. In 2019, Fox was awarded an Honorary Fellowship of the Royal Photographic Society.

The critic Sean O'Hagan, reviewing Resort 1 - Butlin's Bognor Regis in The Guardian, said "Her work often hones in on the particular to suggest the universal, such as her series The Village (1991–1993), in which rural England becomes a pastiche of itself even as the individual lives glimpsed therein seem vividly real."

David Chandler, in his essay Vile Bodies, in the book Anna Fox Photographs 1983-2007, said Fox is "widely regarded as an important part of what might be called the 'second wave' of British colour documentary photography" and that she "helped form its particular style of combative, highly charged use of flash and colour".

== Publications ==
=== Publications by Fox ===
- Work Stations: Office Life in London Photographed by Anna Fox. Camerawork, 1988. ISBN 978-1871103007.
- Street Dreams: Indian Vernacular Studio Photographs. Booth-Clibborn, 1997. ISBN 978-1861540713. Edited by Val Williams.
- Cockroach Diary. Shoreditch Biennale, 2000. ISBN 978-0953319923.
- Zwarte Piet. London: Black Dog, 2001. ISBN 978-1901033861.
- Made in Europe. Milton Keynes Gallery, 2001-2003. Five small paperbacks. Made in Milton Keynes 2001, ISBN 0-9536755-5-6. Made in Gothenburg 2002, ISBN 0-9542029-2-9. Made in Kaunas 2002, ISBN 0-9542029-1-0. Made in Florence 2003, ISBN 0-9542029-5-3. Made in Los Cristianos 2003, ISBN 0-9542029-4-5. Photographs and texts made by teenagers in five European cities.
- Resort 1 - Butlin's Bognor Regis. Amsterdam: Schilt, 2013. ISBN 978-9053308035. Text by Stephen Bull.
- Portraits from an Island. Newsprint catalogue with essay, 2015

=== Other publications ===
- Anna Fox Photographs 1983-2007. By Val Williams. Brighton: Photoworks, 2007. ISBN 978-1903796221. With texts by David Chandler, Val Williams, Jason Evans and Mieke Bal.
- Basics Creative Photography 03: Behind the Image: Research in Photography. London: AVA, 2012. ISBN 978-2940411665. With Natasha Caruana.
- Langford's Basic Photography: The guide for serious photographers. By Michael Langford, Fox, and Richard Sawdon Smith.
  - Waltham, MA: Focal Press, 2015. ISBN 978-0415718912. Tenth edition.

== Exhibitions (selected) ==
- 1990: In Pursuit, solo exhibition, Photographers' Gallery, London, 30 November 1990 – 19 January 1991.
- 2009: Cockroach Diary and Other Stories, Ffotogallery, Turner House Gallery, Penarth, Wales.
- 2011: Resort, Pallant House Gallery, Chichester, UK, 25 June – 2 October 2011.
- 2011: Resort, James Hyman Photography, London, 12 October – 12 November 2011.

== Awards ==
- 2019: Honorary Fellowship of the Royal Photographic Society, Bristol.
