= Natasha Caruana =

Photographic artist (born 1983)

Natasha Caruana (born 1983) is a photographic artist who works with still photography, moving image and installation. She is based in London and is a Senior Lecturer of Photography at the University for the Creative Arts, Farnham, UK.

Caruana's work is based around themes of love, betrayal and fantasy. Her books include ONO (2012) and Married Man (2015).

In 2014 she won the BMW Young Photographer-in-Residency at Nicéphore Niépce Museum, France. Her work is held by the British Library in London.

== Life and work ==
Caruana gained an MA in Photography from the Royal College of Art, London in 2008.

She is a Senior Lecturer of Photography at the University for the Creative Arts, Farnham, UK.

Caruana's The Other Woman series, made in 2005, uses portraits she made of mistresses — women who have had affairs with married men.

Her Fairytale for Sale series (and the book ONO) is about women who sell their wedding dresses online. Using email, Caruana posed as a potential buyer and the women sent her photographs of them wearing their dress, in which they obscured their and their partner's face. They also provided a description of why they were selling the dress, which partially describes why they obscured the faces. Caruana used both the photographs and text in her work.

Her Married Man series is about infidelity. Caruana posed on dating websites aimed at men seeking affairs. She went on 80 dates with 54 men in 2008 and 2009, deceptively making snapshot photographs and secretly recording audio.

== Publications ==
=== Publications by Caruana ===
- ONO. London: Here, 2012. Edition of 150 copies. (Note: Here Press' page about ONO is here)
- Married Man. London: Here, 2015. ISBN 9780957472495. With transcriptions by Caruana. Edition of 500 copies. (Note: Here Press' page about Married Man is here)
- Coup de Foudre. Paris: Trocedero / BMW Art and Culture, 2015.

=== Publication paired with another ===
- Basics Creative Photography 03: Behind the Image: Research in Photography. London: AVA, 2012. ISBN 978-2940411665. With Anna Fox.

=== Publication with contribution by Caruana ===
- Hijacked III: Australia / United Kingdom. Cottesloe, WA: Big City Press; Heidelberg: Kehrer, 2012. ISBN 978-3-86828-285-6. Edited by Mark McPherson, Louise Clements, and Leigh Robb. With texts by Clements and McPherson. Exhibition catalogue.

== Award ==
- 2014: BMW Young Photographer-in-Residency at Nicéphore Niépce Museum, Chalon-sur-Saône, France

== Collections ==
Caruana's work is held in the following public collections:

- British Library, London
- Musée Nicéphore-Niépce, Chalon-sur-Saône, France
