= Chris Shaw (photographer) =

An image from Life as a Night Porter (2006)

Chris Shaw (born 1961) is an English documentary photographer.

== Career ==
Shaw studied at West Surrey College of Art & Design (now University for the Creative Arts) from 1986–89.

Shaw works with independent publishers and he has created small editions of several photographic series including: Retrospecting Sandy Hill (2015), Life as a Night Porter (2006), Weeds of Wallasey (2012), horizon icons (2015), Tokyo in HK (with Tokyo Rummando, 2017), and The Hunter Gets Captured By The Game (2019).

In his 2006 monograph Life as a Night Porter, Shaw published photographs taken over a ten-year period whilst working as a night porter at certain London hotels, "all the time he kept his camera with him, recording in black and white grainy photographs the many strange events that he witnessed, taking pictures." In 2004 Alexander McQueen and Nick Knight chose the pictures as the winning entry in an Independent on Sunday fashion photography competition.

In The Hunter Gets Captured By The Game "we are amid the vibrant nightlife of a Thai holiday resort".

Writing in The Daily Telegraph, journalist John Preston said, "Shaw remains an evasive, almost blurry character who seems to belong in the shadows and who can't bear being stuck in one place for too long."

His working practice is mostly negative based, and heavily worked hand printed archival fibre-based black and white or colour prints. He believes in a physical contact between the materials and the photographer that produces them to form a photograph. His subjects range from night life to Landscape.

== Publications ==
=== Publications by Shaw ===
- Life as a Night Porter. Santa Fe, NM: Twin Palms, 2006. ISBN 978-1931885508. Edition of 2000 copies.
- Before And After Night Porter. Heidelberg, Germany: Kehrer, 2012. ISBN 9783868283211.
- Weeds of Wallasey. Kamakura, Japan: Super Labo, 2013. ISBN 978-4-905052-58-6. Edition of 500 copies.
- Retrospecting Sandy Hill. London: Morel, 2015. ISBN 978-1-907071-58-4. Edition of 500 copies.
- Horizon Icons. London: ADAD, 2015. ISBN 978-0-9576923-3-6. Edition of 500 copies
- Sohollondon. London: Morel, 2018. ISBN 978-1-907071-69-0. Edition of 250 copies.
- Tokyo in Hong Kong. Hong Kong: Zen Photo Gallery, 2018. ISBN 978-4-9054-53-69-7. Edition of 500 copies.
- The Hunter Gets Captured by the Game. Hong Kong: Zen Photo Gallery, 2019. ISBN 978-4-905453-85-7. Edition of 500 copies.
- Golden Bitch. Paris: Inbetween Gallery / Shaw, 2019. ISBN 979-10-699-4177-9. Edition of 250 copies.(golden beach paros Cyclades Greece 1985.

"TPH tufnell Park Hilton " {ISBN 978--4-910244-26-6-}} three hundred copies double sided concertina map like published by Zen Foto Gallery may 2023 (300 copies)

=== Publications with others ===
- Far East Obsession. Hiroshi Onishi, 2015. By Mark Pearson, Shaw and Tokyo Rumando. Edition of 500 copies.

== Exhibitions ==
- Life as a Night Porter, Perm Museum of Contemporary Art, Perm, Russia. Part of the photo festival in Perm, 2012.
- Before and After Night Porter, Tokyo Photo, 2011. Exhibited as a guest of Tate museum and curator Simon Baker.
- Life as a Night Porter and Weeds of Wallasey, Moscow House of Photography, Multimedia Art Museum, Moscow, May–June 2014
- Chris Shaw and Moriyama: Before and After Night, Tate Britain, London, 2013/14. Shaw's Life as a Night Porter, Sandy Hill Estate and Weeds of Wallasey as well as photographs by Daidō Moriyama.
- Weeds of Wallasey, Exposure, Format International Photography Festival, Derby, UK, 2015. Shaw with Alex F. Webb, David Fathi, Francesca Seravalle, Marianne Bjørnmyr, Boris Eldagsen, George Miles, Karl Ohiri, and others.
- Night Porter, agnès b. gallery, Paris, 2016

.The Hunter Gets Captured By The Game Pattaya photographs November 2019 Vu Gallerie.paris.France. .Tufnell Park Hilton..photographs London photo-zen photo gallerie May 2023

== Collections ==
Shaw's work is held in the following permanent collections:

- Carnegie Museum of Art, Pittsburgh, PA
- Tate, London: 72 prints (as of June 2018)
- J. Paul Getty Museum, Los Angeles, CA
- Archive of Modern Conflict, London
- Wilson centre, Hampstead, London
- FRAC, for NANTES, France
