= LUAP =

English artist

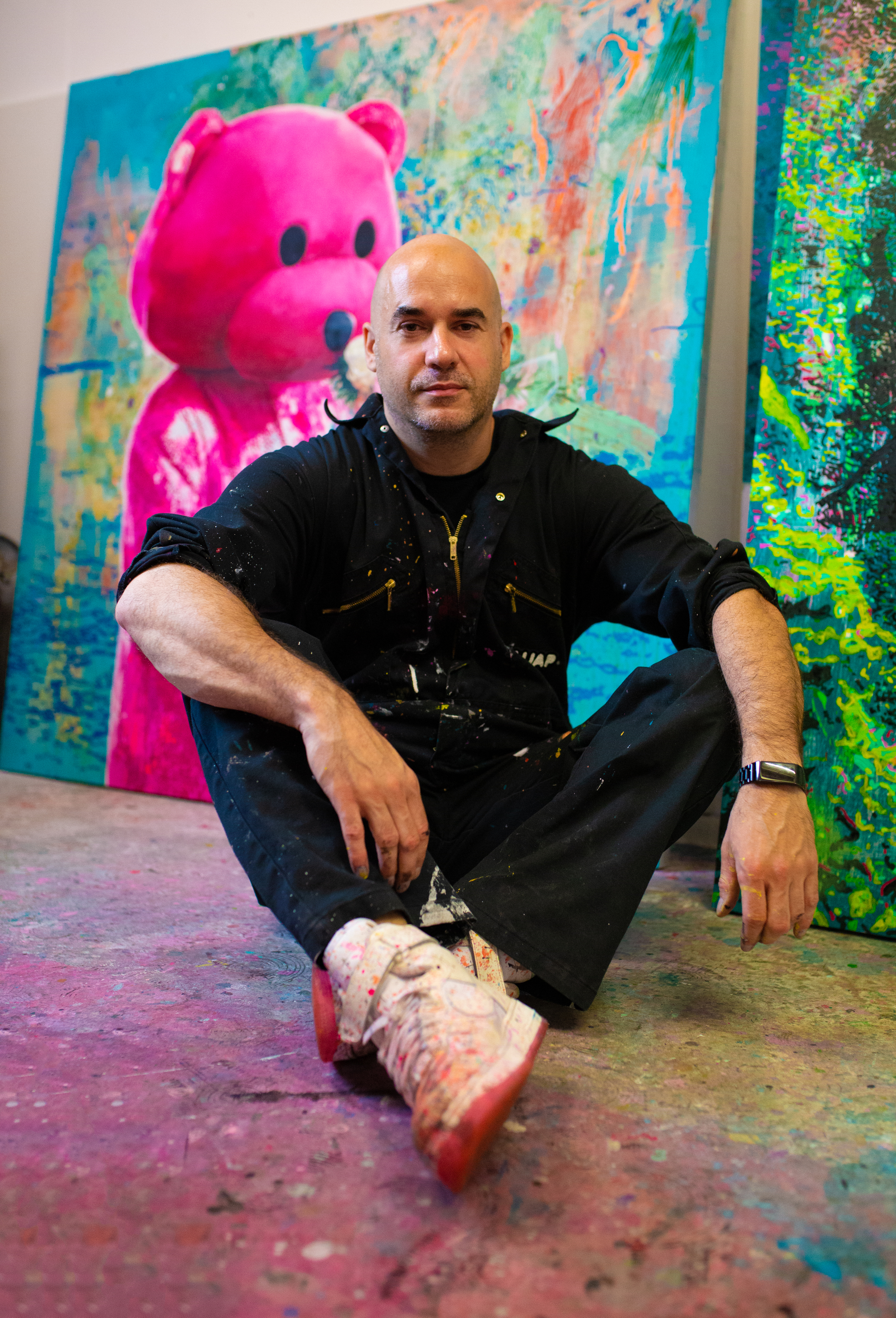
- Born: September 1982 (age 43); Grimsby, Lincolnshire, England
- Education: University for the Creative Arts
- Known for: The Pink Bear, Contemporary Art, Street Art, Performance Art
- Notable work: The Unconscious Therapy, Art in the Age of Now', Love Life Mural
- Website: www.luapstudios.co.uk

Paul Robinson, better known by his alias of LUAP, (born September 1982 in Grimsby, England) is a contemporary artist based in London. He is known for his depiction of The Pink Bear which he uses as a muse within his artworks. His work spans the creative fields of photography, painting, sculpture and performance art.

== Pink Bear ==
A common feature with his work. He describes the Pink Bear as the reincarnation of an old childhood memory. Accessed as part of a treatment of Cognitive Behavioural Therapy (CBT). The bear acts as "symbol of positive reinforcement and discovery"

LUAP describes the use of the bear as being "a path of personal redemption". Describing its use as a mechanism for his own personal fight with depression. The bears origin has its roots in an old childhood memory of a polaroid photograph showing the artist as a child with a pink bear.

== Creative Practice ==
=== Photography ===
LUAP's art is based on photography. Each shot with the pink bear staged amidst a specific landscape or environment. Paintings are then made from the original photographic source. The bear acting as a muse throughout each of the images. Many of the subjects have a focus on mental health, the environment as well as being a commentary of societal issues.

One of the notable aspects of LUAP's photography is in that they are often taken within extreme conditions. All using the Pink Bear as a muse, he travels the world in order to position the Bear amidst these backdrops.

=== Painting ===
LUAP is known for his large scale canvases made using oils and acrylic. Each painting begins with a focus on background. This itself is a remnant of a childhood memory which references the wallpaper in home where he grew up. Once complete the artwork will be painted on top using a combination of realism and abstract mark making techniques. Each painting will generally take months to complete.

=== Sculpture ===
In June 2024 LUAP unveiled a major sculptural installation in Hamburg, Germany. Depicting a giant pink bear head it was 4 metres high and created as part of the Altonale Festival. This was part of a collaboration with the University of Europe for Applied Sciences It acted as both an art piece during the festival and also as an exhibition space. Another notable aspect of the work was that it was made using 2500kg of recycled plastics. It was created using state of the art 3D printing technology at a specialist facility in Avila, Spain. A further series of sculptural works (both large and small) were created as part of the Winter Sculpture Park in Thamesmead, London. This featured a giant pink bear head alongside a series of smaller 'seed heads' which worked alongside the bigger sculpture.

=== Muralism ===
LUAP has created notable murals in London and his home town of Grimsby. Depicting the Pink Bear the piece in Grimsby featured the bear on Cleethorpes beach eating an ice-cream.

== Exhibitions ==
Under the name of LUAP, Robinson has exhibited across the UK and Internationally. Notable exhibitions include 'The Unconscious Therapy' on New Bond Street; 'Art in the Age of Now' at Fulham Town Hall, 'Unleash the Love' at Fortnum & Mason. and Lifelines at the Bottle Factory in Bermondsey
