= Olivier Richon =

Swiss photographer

Olivier Richon (born 1956) is a Swiss photographer living in London. He is a professor at the Royal College of Art.

== Early life and education ==
Richon was born in Lausanne, Switzerland. He studied at the Polytechnic of Central London.

== Academic career ==
He is Professor of Photography in the School of Fine Art within the Royal College of Art.

== Artistic practice ==
Richon has made many photographs of studio still life compositions that typically include fabric drapes. Writing in Studio International, artist Sophie Arkette said: "Richon approaches his compositions from a painterly direction. When he positions an object in a way that protrudes off a table, he is making reference to the way still life painters, such as Chardin display their understanding of perspective. Similarly, his use of draped material ... where it covers the table and its contents like a shroud, can be seen to echo the use of draped fabric within the gamut of traditional still life painting." Writing in Frieze, Sarah James described his work as, "theoretically heavyweight and invested in elaborate deconstruction, his work is also cheeky and flirts with the surreal."

== Publications ==
- Real Allegories. Göttingen, Germany: Steidl, 2006.
- The Sophist and the Photograph. Philosophy of Photography, volume 1, number 1, Intellect Publishers, Spring 2010, pp. 35–40.

== Collections ==
Richon's work is held in the following permanent collection:

- Tate, UK: 15 works (as of October 2020)
