= Justin Bere =

British architect

- Education: Canterbury College of Art
- Occupation: Architect
- Practice: bere:architects
- Buildings: Mayville Community Centre; Camden Passive House; Welsh Futureworks Housing; London Bridge Staircase; Lark Rise Passive House

Justin Bere is a British architect based in London. He is founder of his own practice bere:architects and has developed a specialism in low energy passive house (Passivhaus) buildings, resulting in the first certified passive house building in London in 2010. In 2012 he was named one of the most influential people in UK sustainability by Building Design magazine.

== Education and early career ==
Following a childhood spent in East Africa, England and Northern Ireland, Bere studied architecture at the Canterbury College of Art (now University for the Creative Arts). Upon graduation, he worked for a range of architectural firms, including Sir Michael Hopkins & Partners (now Hopkins Architects), before establishing his own firm in 1994.

== Practice and research ==
Bere established his practice, bere:architects, in 1994. Since its inception bere:architects has focused on low-energy buildings, and was amongst the first UK adopters of the Passive House (Passivhaus) design standard. Bere:architects has developed a distinctive practice model combining design-led architectural practice with environmental and building performance research. This has included working with University College London (‘UCL’) and Innovate UK (formerly the Technology Strategy Board, ‘TSB’) to produce and publish a number of detailed building performance and post-occupancy evaluation reports.

Bere is considered an authority on low-energy design and was named as one of the top 50 most influential people in UK sustainability, by Building Design magazine in 2012. He sat on the RIBA’s Sustainable Futures advisory group from 2010 to 2016. Bere also regularly speaks and advocates on sustainability in the built environment. He has been a guest speaker at the Passivhaus Institute’s International Passivhaus Conference in 2011 on the topic of ‘Cost effective solutions to social housing’ and in 2012 on the topic of ‘Operational performance of a Community Centre in London refurbished to the Passivhaus standard.’ He has been on the judging panel for the CIBSE awards in 2016 and 2017. He is the author of An Introduction to Passive House.

== Notable projects ==
Project name	Image	Location	Completion Date	Awards
The Muse	The Muse	London, UK	Ongoing self-build, started 2004	Archant Environmental Award 2009, winner
Welsh Futureworks Housing (Larch House and Lime House)	Welsh Futureworks Housing (Larch House, left, and Lime House, right)	Ebbw Vale, Wales	2010	Passive House Certified; Larch House – Sustainable Housing Awards 2011, winner; Larch House – RICS Wales Award 2011, winner; Larch House – Constructing Excellence Wales 2011, winner
Mayville Community Centre	Mayville Community Centre	London, UK	2011	Passive House Certified; Architects Journal Retrofit Award 2011, winner; Green Build Leisure Award 2012, winner; Constructing Excellence London and South-East 2012, winner; UK Passivhaus Awards 2012, winner; Energy Efficiency and Renewables Awards 2013, winner
Lark Rise	Lark Rise	Buckinghamshire, UK	2015	Passive House Plus Certified
London Bridge Staircase	London Bridge Staircase	London, UK	2016	

== Publications ==
- An Introduction to Passive House, 2013
- The monitored performance of the first new London dwelling certified to the Passive House standard, Ian Ridley, Justin Bere, Alan Clarke, Yair Schwartz, Andrew Farr, 2013
- The Side by Side in use Monitored Performance of two Passive and Low Carbon Welsh Houses, Ian Ridley, Justin Bere, Hector Altamerino Medina, Sarah Lewis, Mila Durdev, 2014
