= University for the Creative Arts =

Arts university in southern England

- Coat of arms
- Type: Public
- Established: 1856; 170 years ago 2005 (as the University College for the Creative Arts at Canterbury, Epsom, Farnham, Maidstone and Rochester)
- Affiliations: GuildHE
- Chancellor: Magdalene Odundo
- Vice-Chancellor: vacant
- Students: 9,430 (2021–22)
- Undergraduates: 7,685 (2021–22)
- Postgraduates: 1,745 (2021–22)
- Other students: 1,129 FE (2015–16)
- Location: Canterbury, Kent; Epsom and Farnham, Surrey, England, UK
- Website: uca.ac.uk
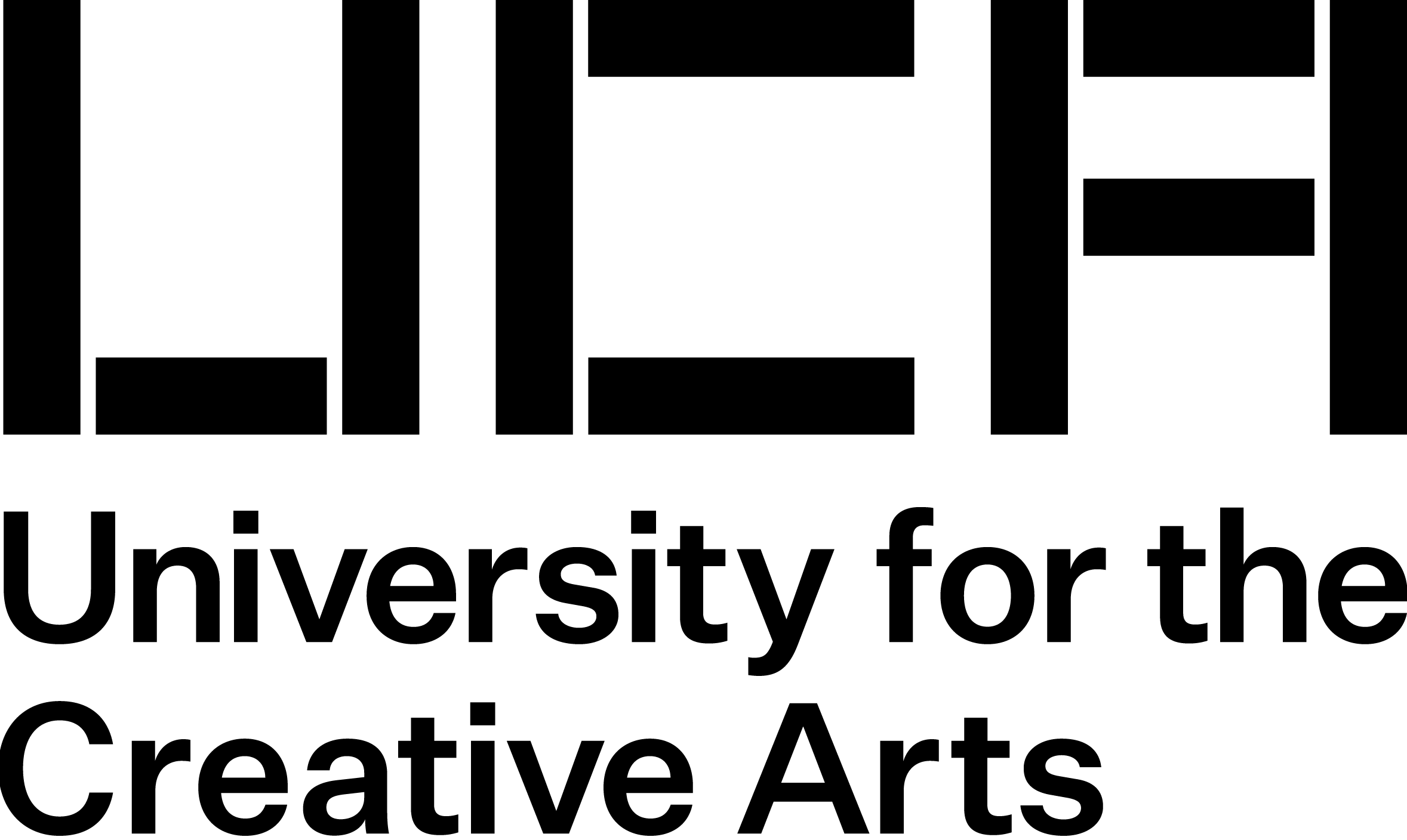

The University for the Creative Arts is a specialist art and design university in Southern England.

It was formed in 2005 as University College for the Creative Arts at Canterbury, Epsom, Farnham, Maidstone and Rochester when the Kent Institute of Art and Design was merged into the Surrey Institute of Art & Design, which already had degree-awarding status; both constituent schools had been formed by merging the local art schools, in Kent and Surrey respectively. It was granted university status in 2008, and the name changed to the present one.

== History ==
The origin of the University for the Creative Arts lies in the establishment of various small art schools in the English counties of Kent and Surrey in the nineteenth century. In Kent the first of these was Maidstone College of Art, founded in 1867, and in Surrey the Guildford School of Art, founded in 1856. During the second half of the twentieth century many of these small art schools merged, eventually forming Kent Institute of Art & Design in 1987, and Surrey Institute of Art & Design in 1995. These two organisations joined forces in 2005 to become the University College for the Creative Arts at Canterbury, Epsom, Farnham, Maidstone and Rochester. In May 2008, the University College for the Creative Arts was granted full university status by the Privy Council, and adopted its current name, the University for the Creative Arts, officially in September 2008. In 2016, it merged with the Open College of the Arts.

=== Timeline ===
- 1856 – Guildford School of Art is founded as Guildford Working Men's Institution
- 1866 – Farnham School of Art is founded
- 1867 – Maidstone College of Art is founded as Maidstone School of Art
- 1868 – Canterbury College of Art is founded as the Sidney Cooper School of Art
- 1886 – Medway College of Design is founded as Rochester School of Art
- 1896 – Epsom School of Art & Design is founded as Epsom Technical Institute & School of Art
- 1969 – Farnham School of Art and Guildford School of Art merge to form West Surrey College of Art & Design
- 1979 – West Surrey College of Art & Design moves to a single building in Farnham closing Guildford campus
- 1987 – Canterbury College of Art, Maidstone College of Art and Medway College of Design merge to form Kent Institute of Art & Design
- 1995 – Epsom School of Art & Design and West Surrey College of Art & Design merge to form Surrey Institute of Art & Design
- 1999 – Surrey Institute of Art & Design receives University College Title from the Privy Council and is renamed Surrey Institute of Art & Design, University College
- 2005 – Kent Institute of Art & Design and Surrey Institute of Art & Design, University College merge to form University College for the Creative Arts at Canterbury, Epsom, Farnham, Maidstone & Rochester
- 2008 – University College for the Creative Arts at Canterbury, Epsom, Farnham, Maidstone & Rochester receives University Title from the Privy Council and is renamed University for the Creative Arts (UCA)
- 2012 – Maidstone campus sold to MidKent College with final teaching scheduled for 2014.
- 2020 – Xiamen University and UCA open The Institute of Creativity and Innovation in China
- 2023 – Rochester Campus closed

== Campuses ==
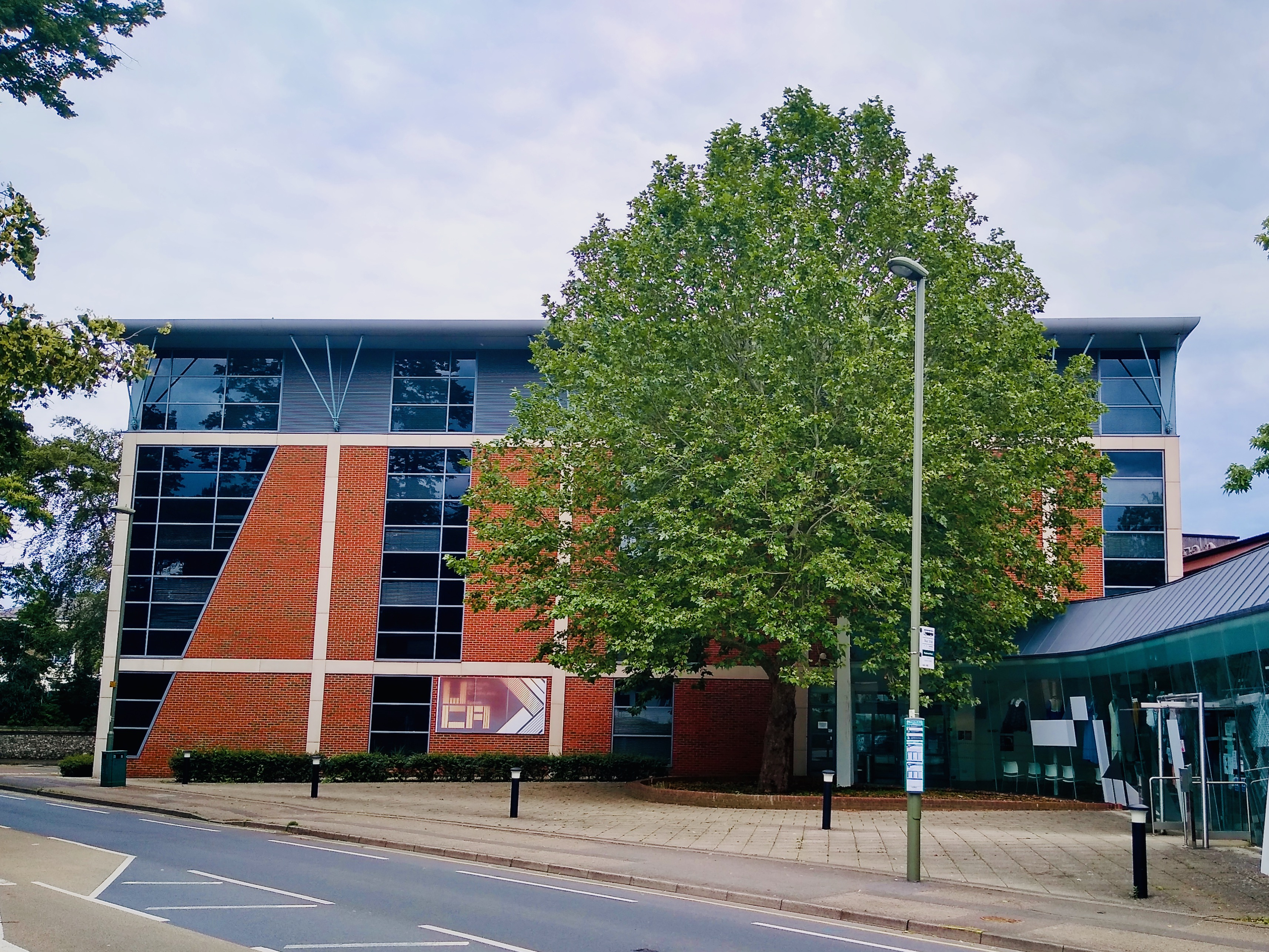
University for the Creative Arts, Epsom campus

UCA has campuses in Canterbury, Epsom and Farnham, plus a teaching base at The Maidstone Studios, and a project and exhibition space in Folkestone Creative Quarter.

It previously had a campus in Maidstone (closed in 2014) and another in Rochester (closed in 2023).

The university also validates provision at, or co-delivers courses with, a number of other educational institutions and arts organisations in the UK: Farnham Maltings, London College of Contemporary Arts, London College of Creative Media, London School of Design & Marketing, and London Studio Centre.

UCA works in partnership with several institutions globally, validating courses for: Berlin School Business & Innovation (Germany), Cyprus Academy of Arts (Cyprus), Hong Kong Management Associations (Hong Kong), The Millennium Universal College (Pakistan), and UK Creative Art and Design Centre (South Korea).

In 2019, UCA and Xiamen University partnered to establish the Institute of Creativity and Innovation, with the Institute opening its doors in September 2020.

=== UCA Canterbury ===
UCA Canterbury is home to architecture, interior design, product design, fine art and visual communications courses. Students have on-campus halls of residence in Ian Dury House and off-campus accommodation in the Riverside Student Quarter.

The UCA Doctoral College for creative PhD study is located close to UCA Canterbury at Rochester House.

=== UCA Epsom ===
Creative business, fashion and textiles courses are run from the UCA Epsom campus. Four different accommodation blocks – Bradford House, Wilberforce Court, Crossways House and Worple Road – are located either next to campus or a ten-minute walk away.

=== UCA Farnham ===
Farnham is the largest of UCA's campuses. Film, media, visual effects, performing arts, music, fine art, photography, animation, crafts, graphic design, illustration, creative technology, and games courses are taught there. It has two large on-campus halls of residence housing 600 students, called University Walk and Student Village.

In June 2022, UCA Farnham became the headquarters for ISEA International.

== Organisation and academic life ==
UCA is the third largest provider of design, and creative and performing arts higher education in the UK, with around 5,845 students. It offers courses in a very wide range of architecture, art, crafts, design, fashion, media and performing arts subjects.

Courses are offered at pre-degree further education, undergraduate, taught postgraduate and doctoral levels.

The university is organised into ten academic schools: Business School for the Creative Industries, Canterbury School of Architecture & Design, School of Communications, School of Fashion & Textiles, School of Film, Media & Performing Arts, School of Fine Art, Crafts & Photography, School of Games & Creative Technology, UCA Doctoral College, UCA International College (UCAIC), and Institute of Creativity and Innovation (ICI).

It has eight research centres: Centre for Sustainable Design, Crafts Study Centre, Animation Research Centre, International Textile Research Centre, Audio Research Cluster, Cluster for Cinema/Affect/Place (CCAP), Conflict and the Creative Arts Research Centre, and UCA Innovation Hub.

The UK's first Business School for the Creative Industries is based at UCA Epsom.

=== Chancellor ===
- 2010 – Zandra Rhodes
- 2018 – Magdalene Odundo

=== Pro-Chancellors / Chairs of the Board of Governors ===
- 2008 – Loyd Grossman
- 2012 – Robert Taylor
- 2020 – Jeremy Sandelson

=== Vice-Chancellors ===
- 2005 – Elaine Thomas
- 2011 – Simon Ofield-Kerr
- 2017 – Alan Cooke (Acting)
- 2017 – Bashir Makhoul
- 2024 – Professor Jane Roscoe
- 2025 – vacant

=== Rankings and reputation ===
Rankings
National rankings
- Complete (2027): 112
- Guardian (2027): 100
- Times / Sunday Times (2027): 127

UCA submitted 115 research outputs to be considered by the expert panel for Art and Design in REF 2021, as well as four impact case studies. REF 2021 ranked 78% of UCA's research as world-leading (4*) and internationally excellent (3*) for its originality, significance and rigour.

== Notable alumni ==
=== TV, Film & Entertainment ===
- Rose Ayling-Ellis, actor and winner of Strictly Come Dancing 2021
- Chris Butler, storyboard artist, writer and director, known for his works at Laika, such as ParaNorman
- Gareth Edwards, BAFTA nominated film director
- Edd Gould, creator of and actor in Eddsworld
- Kate Herron, television director/producer
- Hong Khaou, film director and screen writer
- PJ Liguori, YouTube filmmaker
- William McGregor, film and television director, directed programmes such as Poldark and Misfits
- Chris Shepherd, BAFTA nominated television/film writer and director
- Victor Lledo, Spanish film critic, writer, director and activist

=== Art and Photography ===
- Jane Bown, photographer who worked at The Observer for over 50 years
- Natasha Caruana, photographer
- Babette Cole, children's writer and illustrator, who worked on Bagpuss and Jackanory for BBC television
- Tracey Emin, artist known for her autobiographical and confessional artwork
- Anna Fox, photographer
- Ken Grant, photographer
- Sunil Gupta, photographer
- Martin Handford, children's author and illustrator, creator of Where's Wally?
- John Hedgecoe, photographer who photographed the portrait of Queen Elizabeth II used for United Kingdom postage stamps from 1967 to 2022
- Tony Hart, artist and presenter, designed the ship logo used by Blue Peter
- Eileen Perrier, photographer
- Paul Robinson, artist better known as LUAP
- Khadija Saye, Gambian-British photographer who exhibited in the Diaspora Pavilion at the Venice Biennale in 2017
- Paul Seawright, photographer
- Chris Shaw, photographer
- Paddy Summerfield, photographer
- Richard Spare, artist and master printmaker
- Mary Tourtel, artist and creator of the comic strip Rupert Bear

=== Fashion and Interior Design ===
- Walé Adeyemi, fashion designer, former creative director at New Era, ambassador for The Prince's Trust and stylist to numerous celebrities
- Linda Barker, interior designer and television presenter
- Martin Lambie-Nairn, designer and founder of branding agency Lambie-Nairn, co-creator of Spitting Image
- Dame Zandra Rhodes, fashion and textile designer, designed garments for Diana, Princess of Wales, David Bowie, and Freddie Mercury
- Nymphia Wind (Leo Tsao, 曹米駬), drag queen, performer, stylist, fashion designer, and seamstress, the winner of season sixteen of RuPaul's Drag Race, also the first person of East Asian descent, born and raised in Taiwan to win an installment of the American series, and the second queen of Asian descent to win

=== Writing and Poetry ===
- Nikita Gill, poet, playwright, writer and illustrator
- Wana Udobang, known as Wana Wana, writer, poet, journalist, filmmaker, and television personality, whose work has appeared on the BBC, Al Jazeera and Huffington Post

=== Music ===
- Lasse Gjertsen, animator, musician, and videographer
- Frederick Lloyd, film director and composer, worked featured in the trailers for Zack Snyder's Justice League and The Hunger Games: Catching Fire
- Knucks, musician

=== Architecture ===
- Richard Armiger, architectural model maker and the founder of Network Modelmakers
- Justin Bere, architect and founder of bere:architects, developed a specialism in low-energy passive house (Passivhaus) buildings

=== Animation ===
- Michaël Dudok de Wit, animator, director and illustrator, winner of an Academy Award for Best Animated Short Film for Father and Daughter
- Bob Godfrey, animator, winner of an Academy Award for Best Animated Short Film for Great, founder of UCA's Animation degree course
- Edd Gould, animator, artist, writer director, voice actor and creator of Eddsworld
- David Hulin, animation and VFX director, known for GEICO Gecko, Post Office Ants (UK), and Nigel the Xyzal Owl

== Student life ==
The Students' Union at the University of the Creative Arts (UCASU) is open to all students, and has over 65 clubs and societies across the three campuses.

UCASU offers student advice and support, and runs identity communities for those who self-define one or more of the following groups: BAME (Black, Asian and Minority Ethnicities), LGBTQ+, Disabled and Women.

UCASU used to run events until August 2026, when they announced that the student-run event center was to be shutdown in the coming term.

== See also ==
- Armorial of UK universities
- List of art universities and colleges in Europe
- List of universities in the UK
- Visual arts education
