= Paul Reas =

British photographer (born 1955)

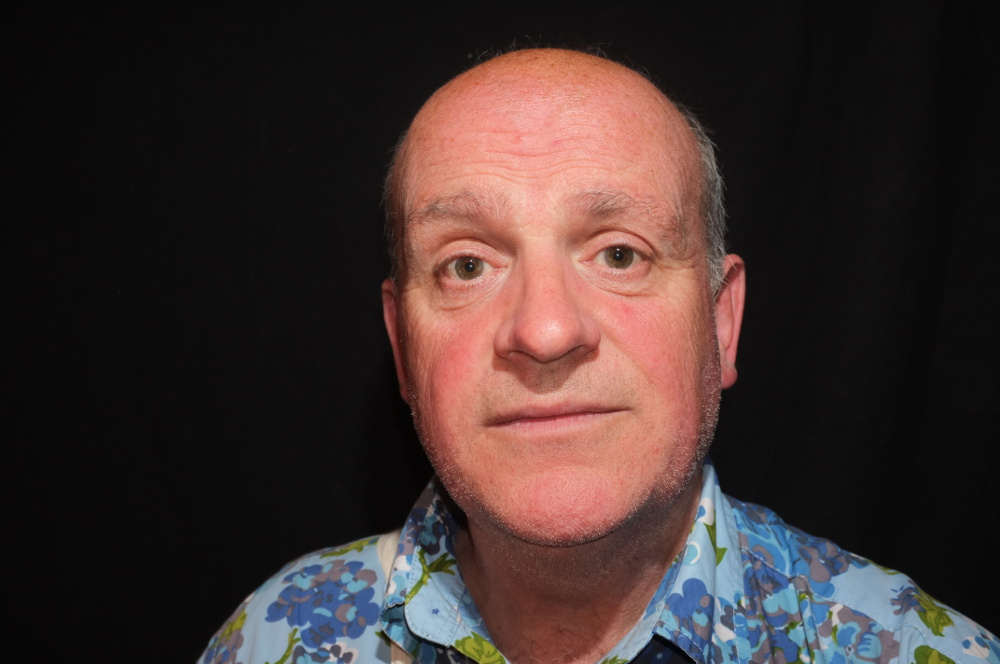
Reas, 2014

Paul Reas (born 1955) is a British social documentary photographer and university lecturer. He is best known for photographing consumerism in Britain in the 1980s and 1990s.

Reas has produced the books I Can Help (1988), Flogging a Dead Horse: Heritage Culture and Its Role in Post-industrial Britain (1993) and Fables of Faubus (2018). He has had solo exhibitions at The Photographers' Gallery and London College of Communication, London; Cornerhouse, Manchester; and Impressions Gallery, Bradford. His work is held in the collection of the British Council.

== Life and work ==
Reas grew up in a working class family on the Buttershaw council estate in Bradford. He was born and lived with four siblings in a house on Brafferton Arbor (since demolished) and was mostly raised by his mother, who also worked at Baird Television Ltd. assembling televisions, or as a cleaner. (He would later remember his father as "Only ever there on Sundays and even then a sleeping, silent figure in an armchair.") He left Buttershaw Comprehensive aged fifteen and spent five years as an apprentice bricklayer with the firm of Roy W Parkin in Clayton.

He left Bradford to study documentary photography at the University of Wales, Newport from 1982 to 1984. David Hurn was course head and among his tutors were Daniel Meadows, John Benton-Harris and Martin Parr. After six years as an undergraduate and then a college photography technician, he became a freelance photographer.

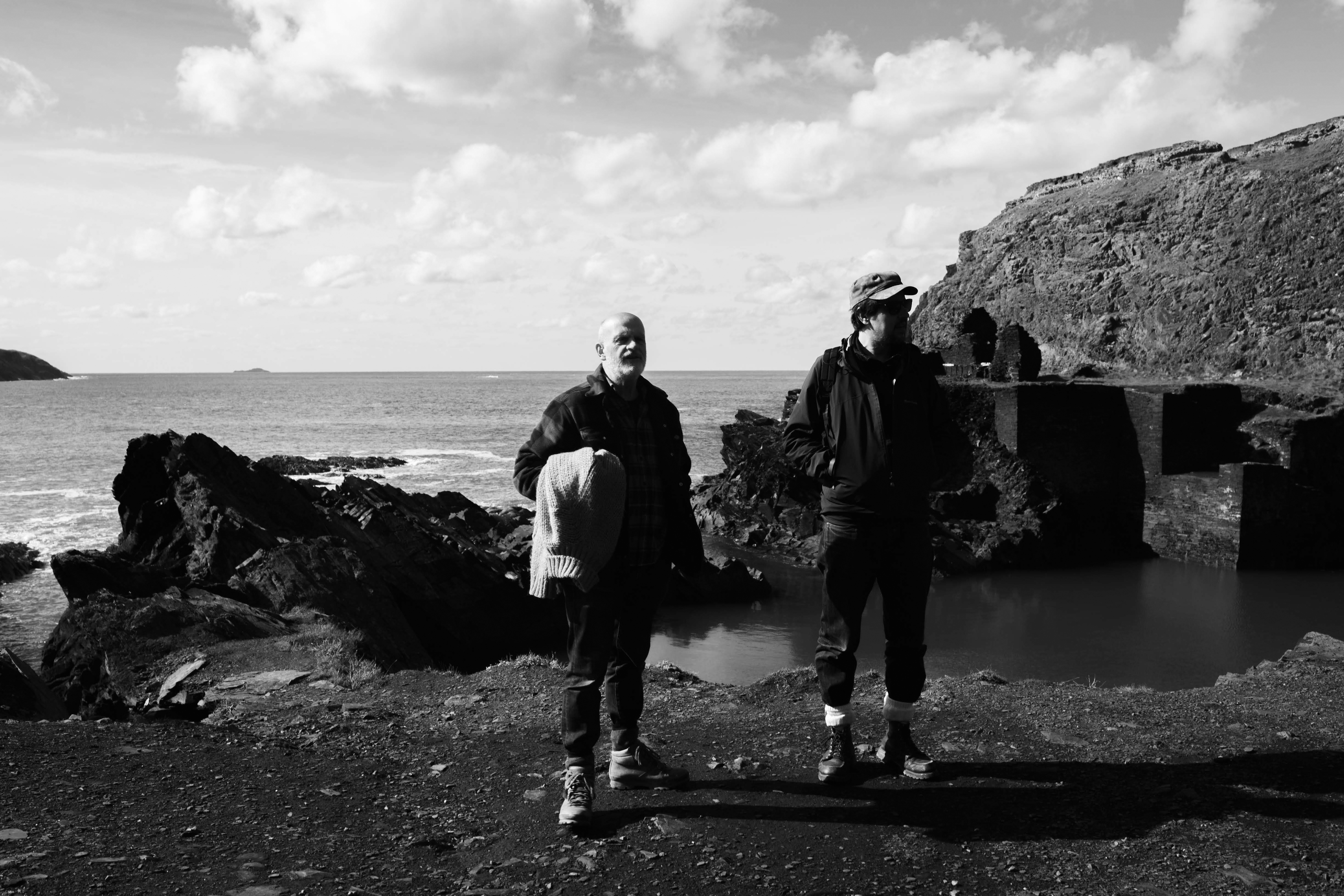
Reas with fellow photographer and lecturer David Barnes. Abereiddy Bay, Wales, 2019.

Impressed first by Parr's photography of Hebden Bridge and the work of the Exit group (Chris Steele-Perkins, Paul Trevor and Nicholas Battye) in Survival Programmes, Reas began with humanistic, fly on the wall, documentary photography in black-and-white using a 35 mm camera. He photographed working people, taking inspiration from both August Sander and Lee Friedlander's portrayal of working people, that he considered gave them the grace and dignity he experienced working in industry. (Note: As seen in Sander's People of the 20th Century series and Friedlander's Lee Friedlander at Work (2002). Reas in particular cites Sander's photograph of a hod carrier (a bricklayer) from 1928.) He soon moved into more subjective photography and in colour. He was aware of the colour photography of Paul Graham and Martin Parr, Charlie Meecham and Bob Phillips, but it was seeing the work of North American colour photographers William Eggleston, Joel Sternfeld, Stephen Shore and Joel Meyerowitz that convinced him to change to colour for his own work and put him into an influential group of British colour documentarists including Graham and Anna Fox. He changed to a larger format camera, which allowed smaller details to be easily read and understood, not requiring the bold graphic statements he considered necessary with 35 mm; and to using a flashgun.

As influences and inspirations, Reas has also cited David Byrne and Talking Heads, and northern soul.

In 1985 he and Ron McCormick were the first photographers commissioned by Ffotogallery in Wales as part of its Valleys Project to each produce a body of work which "focussed on the changing topographic landscape and the partial introduction of new technology into a latter day industrial wasteland". Other photographers commissioned were David Bailey, Mike Berry, John Davies, Peter Fraser, Francesca Odell, Roger Tiley and William Tsui. (Note: A resource on the Valleys Project is available here (PDF) within Ffotogallery's website.)

Reas's first book, I Can Help, shows supermarkets, superstores and the like, photographed from 1985 to 1988. Val Williams writes that "The people who Reas photographed emerged from its pages . . . as lost souls, modern Ancient Mariners adrift in an ocean of endless choices." The photographs (1989–1993) in his second book, Flogging a Dead Horse, "explored the rise of the heritage business, taking issue with what he judged to be the cynical re-writing of the past of British working people by the leisure industry"; they are "edgy, viciously satirical comments on our appetite for vicarious experience."

Reas worked commercially as an editorial photographer for The Sunday Times Magazine, The Observer and the BBC. For a period he worked as an advertising photographer for clients such as BT and Volkswagen.

He taught at the Faculty of Arts, University of Brighton, from 1993 to 1998. He is course leader of documentary photography at the University of Wales, Newport.

In 2011/2012 Reas completed From a Distance, a year-long commission on the regeneration of the Elephant and Castle in South London, part of The Elephant Vanishes project, directed by Patrick Sutherland, for London College of Communication. He photographed people candidly, showing fraught and tense emotions (with the aid of an assistant with a boom mounted flashgun); portraits; cans of incense intended to provide help under specific social pressures; and discarded furniture. The photographs were exhibited in 2012 and published by Photography and the Archive Research Centre (PARC) in Fieldstudy 16: From a Distance. (Note: Fieldstudy 16 is available here (PDF) within the UAL Research Online website.)

Reas has said of his work that "I would say I photograph people but I think the pictures are more about systems people find themselves in, people shopping in supermarkets, but it’s about consumerism and how we are caught up in that. I never set anything up. Everything I photograph is as it happens".

As well as consumerism, Reas has also been concerned with politics, Americanisation, the heritage industry, gender politics and how northern working-class people are historically represented. His work is usually biographical.

In 1993, Reas began a series, Portrait of an Invisible Man, that examined the mystery of his distant and mostly absent father "by photographing the microcosm which a child observes in the macrocosm of home". The curators of an exhibition at the Barbican wrote of this series: "Paul Reas's meticulously constructed descriptions of domestic life may perhaps exorcise demons, the ghouls and goblins which inhabit a child's imagination; they are photography as remedy, as exhumation and a personal adventure on a grand scale."

Williams writes that Reas's work of the early 1990s "assume a documentary stance, but they are essentially polemical." Robert Clark writes in The Guardian:

Reas has an eye for themes that reveal a prevailing air of social disillusionment and cultural vacuity. As traditional industry disappears, we see the emergence of assembly-line technologies. The architectural identity of towns dissolve to make way for out-of-town shopping malls. Heritage-industry theme parks indulge in a politically dubious nostalgia as the London property boom explodes. On the face of it it’s unrelentingly grim. Yet Reas populates such scenes with real characters, replete with poker-faced humour and shrugging defiance."

== Publications ==
=== Publications by Reas ===
- I Can Help. Manchester: Cornerhouse, 1988. ISBN 0-948797-06-1. With a foreword by Rod Jones and a text ("Hey big spender") by Stuart Cosgrove.
- Flogging a Dead Horse: Heritage Culture and Its Role in Post-industrial Britain. Manchester: Cornerhouse, 1993. ISBN 0-948797-52-5. With text by Stuart Cosgrove and an afterword by Val Williams.
- Fables of Faubus. London: Gost, 2018. ISBN 978-1-910401-10-1. With essays by Stuart Cosgrove, David Chandler, Ken Grant and Val Williams.

=== Publications with contributions by Reas ===
- Pivot: Sixteen Artists Using Photography in Wales and Philadelphia. Llandudno, Wales: Oriel Mostyn, 1991. ISBN 9780906860168. By Chris Colclough. Catalogue of an exhibition held in Wales and Philadelphia, 15 June – 14 September 1991. Photographs by S Packer, Helen Sear, Paul Reas, Alistair Crawford, C. Colclough, Peter Finnemore, Suzanne Greenslade, Keith Arnatt and others. Texts by Paula Marincola and Susan Beardmore in English and Welsh.
- Positive Lives: Responses to HIV. London: Network Photographers; Cassell, 1993. ISBN 0-304-32846-4. Part of the Cassell AIDS Awareness Series. Edited by Stephen Mayes and Lyndall Stein. Reas contributes photographs for a chapter, "Rupert - A Life Story". Also includes photographic essays from Denis Doran, John Sturrock, Mike Abrahams, Mike Goldwater, Judah Passow, Mark Power, Jenny Matthews, Barry Lewis and Christopher Pillitz, Steve Pyke, Paul Lowe and Gideon Mendel. Foreword by Edmund White. Introduction by Stephen Mayes. Each chapter also includes a written essay.
- Who's Looking at the Family? London: Barbican Art Gallery, 1994. Edited by Val Williams, Carol Brown and Brigitte Lardinois. ISBN 0946372322. Accompanying an exhibition.
- Documentary Dilemmas: Aspects of British Documentary Photography, 1983–1993. London: British Council, 1994. ISBN 0-86355-232-3. Catalogue of the exhibition, edited by Brett Rogers.
- The House in the Middle; Photographs of Interior Design in the Nuclear Age. Brighton: Photoworks, 2004, ISBN 9781903796146. Accompanied an exhibition; also with work by Anne Hardy, Danny Treacy, Dirk Wackerfuss, Jo Broughton, John Kippin, Richard Billingham, and others.
- From Talbot to Fox. 150 Years of British Social Photography. London: James Hyman, 2012. Edition of 50. An overview of British social photography published to accompany an exhibition by James Hyman Photography at The AIPAD Photography Show New York in 2011. Includes photographs by William Henry Fox Talbot, David Octavius Hill & Robert Adamson, Roger Fenton, Horatio Ross, Julia Margaret Cameron, Thomas Annan, Bill Brandt, Bert Hardy, Roger Mayne, Cecil Beaton, Caroline Coon, Paul Reas, Jem Southam, Ken Grant, Karen Knorr, Anna Fox and others.

== Exhibitions ==
=== Solo exhibitions ===
- 1988: I Can Help. Photographers' Gallery, London; Olympus Gallery, Amsterdam. Stills Gallery, Edinburgh.
- 1988: Fotobienal, Vigo.
- 1993: Flogging a Dead Horse: Paul Reas. Photographers' Gallery, London; Cornerhouse, Manchester; and tour.
- 2012: From a Distance. The Gallery, London College of Communication, 12–25 October 2012. Photographs of the Elephant and Castle, made as part of the project The Elephant Vanishes.
- 2013/2014: “Day Dreaming about the Good Times?”, December 2013–March 2014, Impressions Gallery, Bradford. March–May 2014, Ffotogallery, Penarth, Wales. A retrospective of his personal, editorial and advertising work.

=== Joint exhibitions ===
- 1985: Image and Exploration: Some Directions in British Photography 1980–85. Photographers' Gallery, London. With Chris Belcher, Chris Colclough, Berris Conolly, Mary Cooper, Peter Gale, Damian Gillie, Helen Harris, Paul Highnam, Sarah Morley, Paul Reas, Christopher Taylor and Mark Warne.
- 1985: The Globe: Representing the World. Photographers' Gallery, London. With E. Christo, Dwina Fitzpatrick, Brian Griffin, Peter Kennard, Paul Reas, Rodchenko, Sebastião Salgado, Susan Trangmar and Boyd Webb.
- 1987–1988: Young European Photographers. Frankfurter Kunstverein, Frankfurt; Galerie Faber, Vienna.
- 1988: Critical Realism. Camden Arts Centre, London.
- 1988: The New Generation. Fotobienal, Vigo, Spain.
- 1989: Condemned to Making Sense. Perspektief Gallery, Rotterdam.
- 1989: Through the Looking Glass. Barbican Art Gallery, London.
- 1989: Image and Exploration. The Photographers' Gallery, London
- 1989: Valleys Project. Galerie im Lichthof, Stuttgart
- 1990: Fotobienale, Enschede, Netherlands.
- 1990: Vigovisións. Fotobienal, Vigo, Spain.
- 1990: Heritage Image and History. Cornerhouse, Manchester.
- 1991: Pivot: Sixteen Artists Using Photography in Wales and Philadelphia, Oriel Mostyn, Llandudno, UK.
- 1992: Rencontres d'Arles, Arles, France.
- 1992: ICI Awards, National Portrait Gallery, London, and tour.
- 1993: A Positive View. Saatchi Gallery, London
- 1993: Positive Lives: Responses to HIV. Photographers' Gallery, London, and tour. With Mike Abrahams, Denis Doran, Mike Goldwater, Fergus Greer, Mark Fower, Barry Lewis, Paul Lowe, Jenny Matthews, Gideon Mendel, Judah Passow, Chris Pillitz, Mark Power, Steve Pyke, Paul Reas and John Sturrock.
- 1993–1996: Documentary Dilemmas. British Council. 80 works by 13 artists selected by Brett Rogers. Included work by John Davies, Anna Fox, Julian Germain, Paul Graham, Tommy Harris, Anthony Haughey, Chris Killip, John Kippin, Karen Knorr, Martin Parr, Paul Reas, Paul Seawright and Jem Southam. Toured internationally.
- 1994: Who's Looking at the Family? Barbican Art Gallery, London. Reas exhibited Portrait of an Invisible Man.
- 1995: Foto International. Foto Institute, Rotterdam
- 1998: Rencontres d’Arles. Arles, France
- 2001: Memorias da Cidade. Braga, Portugal
- 2004: Hirschl Gallery. London
- 2004: A Gentle Madness. National Museum of Photography, Film and Television, Bradford.
- 2004: The House in the Middle. Towner Art Gallery, Eastbourne.
- 2006: From Brighton, Diaphane Editions, Montreuil sur Brèche, France. Work from photographers living in Brighton: Jim Cooke, Nigel Green, Marcus Haydock, Stephen Hughes, Magali Nougarède and Paul Reas.
- 2006: Memórias da cidade, Encontros da Imagem. D. Diogo de Sousa Museum, Braga, Portugal. Exhibition by 30 artists.
- 2007: How We Are: Photographing Britain. Tate Britain. Included contributions from numerous photographers.
- 2008/2009: ParrWorld, touring exhibition, Haus der Kunst, Munich, 2008; Breda Design Museum, The Netherlands, 2008; Galerie nationale du Jeu de Paume, Paris, 2009; Baltic, Gateshead, UK, 2009.
- 2010: Nothing is in the place. Photographs of the 1990s by AVI, Anonymous (Value Action), Donald Christie, Vicki Churchill, Brett Dee, Nigel Dickinson, Chris Dyer, Jason Evans, Anna Fox, Ken Grant, Nick Knight, Mark Lally, Clive Landen, Gordon MacDonald, Martin Parr, Vinca Petersen, Mark Power, Paul Reas, Richard Sawdon-Smith, Helen Sear, Paul Seawright, Nigel Shafran, Wolfgang Tillmans, Nick Waplington, Jack Webb, Tom Wood, and Dan Wootton; curated by Jason Evans. Gallery of Contemporary Art Bunkier Sztuki, Photomonth in Kraków, 2010; part of Fringe Focus, The Old Co-Op Building, Brighton, during Brighton Photo Biennial, 2010.
- 2013: Da Memória, part of Memórias da cidade, Festival da Criatividade GNRation ON, Braga, Portugal. Exhibition by Antoine D'Agata, Céu Guarda, Frédéric Bellay, Jim Dow, Luc Choquer, Luísa Ferreira, Luís Palma, Mariana Viegas, Martin Parr, Paul Reas, Paulo Catrica, and Vari Caramés.

== Awards ==
- 1999: Silver Award, The OK! Magazine Award - Best Use of Photography, Campaign Press Advertising Awards 1999, for Wedding (Volkswagen advertisement for which Reas was the photographer). One of three adverts in a Volkswagen campaign. Wedding and the campaign itself also won other awards in the same ceremony.
- 1999: Yellow Pencil, D&AD for Wedding (Volkswagen advertisement).
- 2004: Bronze, Best Portrait Poster category, 2004 Creative Circle Awards, for an advertisement for Tesco Metro for which he was photographer.

== Collections ==
Reas's work is held in the following public collection:

- British Council
