= Mike Abrahams =

British documentary photographer and photojournalist

- Born: Michael Abrahams; 1952 (age 73–74)
- Education: Polytechnic of Central London
- Known for: Photography
- Notable work: The Holy Mountain
- Awards: World Press Photo: Daily Life (2000)
- Website: mikeabrahams.com

Mike Abrahams (born 1952) is a British documentary photographer and photojournalist who is based in London. He is best known for his photographs documenting the lives of ordinary people, particularly his work in Northern Ireland and on Christian pilgrimage around the world.

== Career ==
Mike Abrahams' photographs have been published by major British newspapers including The Times, The Sunday Times, The Observer Magazine, and The Daily Telegraph, The Independent Magazine and in magazines including Time and Forbes, Der Spiegel, Stern and Grands Reportages. His work has also appeared in several books, numerous exhibitions and TV documentaries. His photographs "Faith" was awarded third prize in the 2000 World Press Photo awards: Daily Life and he has been exhibited at the Royal Academy of Arts.

He was a founder member of the Network Photographers picture agency. Subjects of Abrahams' photographic collections have included Northern Ireland, Christian pilgrimage, the Battle of Lewisham (1977), inmates at Pentonville Prison (1983), and the Crufts dog show.

As a portrait photographer, his subjects have included musicians (David Bowie, Brian Eno, Sinead O'Connor); playwrights (David Hare, Dennis Potter, Tom Stoppard); politicians (Diane Abbott, Gordon Brown, Margaret Thatcher); and other public figures such as Richard Branson, Howard Marks, and Benjamin Zephaniah.

=== Early work ===
One of the earliest exhibitions of Abrahams' work was Camden Co-Optic, at St. Pancras Library, Shaw Theatre in 1975, alongside photos by Dorothy Bohm and Fay Godwin. Other early exhibitions included Growing Old (Hampstead, 1977) and No Nuclear Weapons (Bow, 1980) with Peter Kennard.

In 1977, Abrahams' work illustrated Gladys Elder's book The Alienated: Growing Old Today (Writers and Readers Publishing Cooperative). An exhibition of the photos from the book was held at the Half Moon Gallery in London.

His pictures of the controversial National Front march and the Lewisham Against Racism counter protest in August 1977 were published by Time Out and Camerawork magazines. He was a regular contributor to Camerawork magazine, including a photo essay on the Sellafield nuclear site (then known as Windscale Nuclear Reprocessing Plant) in February 1980.

=== Network Photographers ===
In 1981, Abrahams co-founded the Network Photographers picture agency together with Barry Lewis, Chris Davies, Laurie Sparham, John Sturrock, Judah Passow, Mike Goldwater, Martin Slavin, and Steve Benbow.

Throughout the 1980s, photographs taken by Abrahams were included in several Network Photographers exhibitions at Impressions Gallery in Bradford, West Yorkshire, including Working the Surface of the Earth (1988). The photographs have been archived by the National Science and Media Museum in Bradford.

=== Northern Ireland ===
In 1990, Abrahams' book Still War: Photographs From The North of Ireland compiled his images of daily life in a community at war. The Irish civil rights leader and politician, Bernadette McAliskey, said the book "can be charged and found guilty of disturbing the peace. Colin Jacobson, picture editor of The Independent newspaper, called his work in Northern Ireland, "documentary photography at its best – imaginative, comprehensive, confident and concerned".

=== Positive Lives ===
Abrahams' photographs were included in Positive Lives: Response to HIV & AIDS (1991-2010), a collaboration between the Terrence Higgins Trust, Stephen Mayes and the photographers of the Network agency. Work started in 1991 and premiered in 1993 at FotoFeis, Glasgow and at The Photographers’ Gallery in London, accompanied by a book published by Cassell. The project focused on the social responses to HIV/AIDS and the impact of fear and bigotry on sufferers, their families, and friends. From its inception in the UK in 1991 and its initial launch in 1993, Positive Lives evolved over two decades, with exhibits in more than 30 countries on six continents. New work was created that was specific to each territory. The project was supported by the Levi Strauss Foundation and the Elton John Foundation. The other photographers involved in Positive Lives included Denis Doran, Mike Goldwater, Fergus Greer, Mark Fowler, Barry Lewis, Paul Lowe, Jenny Matthews, Gideon Mendel, Judah Passow, Chris Pillitz, Mark Power, Steve Pyke, Paul Reas, and John Sturrock.

=== Faith ===
In 2000, Abrahams won third prize in the Daily Life category of the World Press Photo awards for his photograph "The Holy Mountain", showing pilgrims climbing barefoot up Croagh Patrick to say a mass in honour of Saint Patrick. The work was taken from Faith: A Journey With Those Who Believe, a collection of photographs documenting the passion of pilgrims throughout the world and exploring Christian mystery and superstition with a foreword by Peter Stanford. Abrahams' photographs exploring Christianity were exhibited at the Association of Photographers gallery in April 2001.

=== Work in film ===
Abrahams worked as a photographer on the 1984 documentary film, South Africa: A Land Divided, which was sponsored by Christian Aid. He was the stills photographer for Terence Davies' 1988 film Distant Voices, Still Lives, starring Freda Dowie, Pete Postlethwaite, Angela Walsh and Pauline Quirke. His work was featured in Renny Bartlett's 1989 short film, No Explanation Is Necessary: The Nationalist community of Northern Ireland. The five minute film was part of a series called Moving Stills, focusing on documentary photographers living and working Britain, and also featured Abrahams' colleague from Network Photographers, Laurie Sparham.

=== Other work ===
In 1992, Abrahams published a collection of six black and white prints entitled British Suburban Cowboys featuring British fans of Country and Western music. His photography was featured in Revealing Views: Images From Ireland (1999) by Joanne Bernstein and Mark Sealy, published in London by Royal Festival Hall, alongside work by Seán Hillen, Mary McIntyre, Pádraig Murphy, Steve Pyke, Paul Seawright, and Victor Sloan.

Abrahams' work has been used in educational textbooks such as 2015's Rights and Protest (Oxford University Press) by Mark Rogers and Peter Clinton, and The Middle East: Conflict, Crisis and Change, 1917-2012, published in 2017.

In 2019, his picture Gangasagar was exhibited at the Royal Academy as part of their Summer Exhibition. A photograph of women washing in the Muri Ganga river in Gangasagar, India, It was selected by Amelia Windsor in Tatler as her highlight of the exhibition.

As a corporate photographer, Abrahams has taken photographs for end of year reports by Premier Oil and Unilever among others.

== Publications ==
The Alienated: Growing Old Today (Writers and Readers Publishing Cooperative, 1977) – with Gladys Elder and JB Priestley

Still War: Photographs From The North of Ireland (New Amsterdam Books, New York, 1990) – with Laurie Sparham

Positive Lives: A Response To HIV & AIDS (Cassell, New York, 1993) – with Stephen Mayes, Lyndall Stein, and Edmund White

Faith: A Journey With Those Who Believe (Network Photographers, London, 2000) – foreword by Peter Stanford
