= Jenny Matthews =

British photographer (born 1948)

Jenny Matthews (born 1948) is a British documentary photographer whose work has focused on the lives of women and girls. She was a member of the Format photographic agency and is currently a member of Panos Pictures.

== Life and work ==
In 1983, Matthews was a founding member of Format, the UK's first women's photographic agency. From 1989 to 2005 she was a member of Network Photographers. Since 2005, she has been a member of Panos Pictures. She has worked on assignments all over the world.

Matthews's Sewing Conflict: Photography, War and Embroidery exhibition at Street Level Photoworks in Glasgow, 2024, combined photography and embroidery in a series of photo quilts.

== Publications ==
=== Publications by Matthews ===
- Women and War. University of Michigan Press, 2003. ISBN 978-0472089642.
- Children Growing Up With War. Franklin Watts, 2014. ISBN 978-1445123479.

=== Zines by Matthews ===
- Women Protest 1981–1991. Southport: Café Royal, 2024. Edited by Craig Atkinson.

=== Publications with contributions by Matthews ===
- Positive Lives: Responses to HIV. London: Network Photographers; Cassell, 1993. ISBN 0-304-32846-4. Part of the Cassell AIDS Awareness Series. Edited by Stephen Mayes and Lyndall Stein. Includes photographic essays from Matthews, Denis Doran, Paul Reas, John Sturrock, Mike Abrahams, Mike Goldwater, Judah Passow, Mark Power, Barry Lewis and Christopher Pillitz, Steve Pyke, Paul Lowe and Gideon Mendel. Foreword by Edmund White. Introduction by Stephen Mayes.
- One Year! Photographs From the Miners' Strike 1984–85. London: Bluecoat, 2024. Photographs by Brenda Prince, Chris Killip, John Sturrock, John Harris, Matthews, Roger Tiley, Imogen Young, and Philip Winnard. ISBN 9781908457905. With an introduction by Isaac Blease, an afterword by Martin Parr, essays by Blease, Parr, Siân James, and transcripts of interviews by Phillipa Kelly.

== Exhibitions ==
=== Solo exhibitions ===
- Arms & The Woman, SOAS University of London, London, October—December 1998
- Women and War, Side Gallery, Newcastle, 2013
- Threads of War, Farleys House, September—October 2023
- Sewing Conflict: Photography, War and Embroidery, Street Level Photoworks, Glasgow, February—May 2024. Also included the series Torn Apart and Facial De-recognition.

=== Group exhibitions ===
- Format Photography Agency 1983 – 2003, National Portrait Gallery, London, January—August 2010
- Photographing Protest, Four Corners Gallery, London, 2022
- One Year! Photographs from the Miners' Strike 1984/85, Martin Parr Foundation, Bristol, January–March 2024
