= Stephen Mayes =

American photographer

- Education: Lancaster University
- Occupation: Photographer
- Website: stephenmayes.co

Stephen Mayes is an American photographer. He has worked in the fields of photography, art, and journalism since 1987. He was the New York head of VII Photo Agency, and secretary of the World Press Photo Competition.

== Life and work ==
Mayes studied at Lancaster University.

He has worked as Editor at Rex Features, 1987–1989; Director of Network Photographers (an independent reportage agency), 1989–1994; creative director for Getty Images, 1994–1998; CEO of Photonica, USA, 1999–2001; Creative Director for eyestorm.com, 2001–2002; Director of the Image Archive at Art + Commerce, 2003–2007; Non Executive Board Member at VII Photo Agency, 2007–2008; Chief Operating Officer (Americas) at Image Source, 2007–2008; Secretary to the International Jury, World Press Photo Foundation, 2004–2012; CEO at VII Photo, 2008–2013; freelance from 2013 as well as executive director of the Tim Hetherington Trust since 2013.

He has also curated photography exhibitions.

== Publications ==
- Positive Lives: Responses to HIV. London: Network Photographers; Cassell, 1993. ISBN 0-304-32846-4. Part of the Cassell AIDS Awareness Series. Edited by Mayes and Lyndall Stein. Mayes also contributes an introduction, "Photographing the Invisible - a Statement of Intent". Includes photographic essays from Denis Doran, John Sturrock, Michael Abrahams, Mike Goldwater, Judah Passow, Mark Power, Jenny Matthews, Paul Reas, Barry Lewis and Christopher Pillitz, Steve Pyke, Paul Lowe and Gideon Mendel. Foreword by Edmund White. Each chapter also includes a written essay.
- Critical Mirror: Photojournalism Since the 1950s. London: Thames & Hudson, 1996. ISBN 978-0500278482. Edited by Mayes. Introduction by Richard Avedon.
- No Heroes: The Photographs of Roger Hutchings. London: London Institute, 2003. ISBN 978-0953996728. Mayes contributes an introduction.
- The Noir A-Z. Brooklyn, NY: Mark Batty, 2009. ISBN 978-0981780573. Mayes contributes an afterword.
