= Jonathan Worth =

Jonathan Worth may refer to:

- Jonathan Worth (Governor) (1802–1869), the 39th Governor of the U.S. state of North Carolina from 1865 to 1868
- Jonathan Worth (photographer), British portrait photographer
