= Brenda Prince =

British photographer (born 1950)

Brenda Prince (born 1950) is a British photographer who documented women's lives. She was a member of the Format photographic agency from 1983 to 2001. The Brenda Prince Archive is held at Bishopsgate Institute, London.

== Life and work ==
Prince was born in Hackney, London. She worked as publicity officer for the British Film Institute for 7 years in her 20s. She took up photography in 1978 and from 1979 to 1982 studied Photographic Arts at the Polytechnic of Central London. In 1983, she joined Format, an agency that represented women photographers. During the 1984–1985 United Kingdom miners' strike, Prince spent 18 months covering the mining communities in Nottinghamshire from the miners wives' perspective. Later, she documented women's lives in the Soviet Union, Philippines, and Iraqi Kurdistan. Around 1993, she spent a year photographing women in various roles in the Church of England, highlighting their struggle to become ordained as priests. In 2001, she left Format, retiring from photography to become a psychotherapist.

== Publications ==
=== Zines by Prince ===
- Brenda Prince — Women & The Miners' Strike Nottinghamshire 1984–85. Southport: Café Royal, 2023. Edited by Craig Atkinson.

=== Publications with contributions by Prince ===
- Striking Women: Communities and Coal. London: Pluto, 1986. Photographs by Prince, Izabela Jedrzejczyk, Raissa Page, and Imogen Young. ISBN 9780745301549. With essays by Siân James and Angela V. John.
- One Year! Photographs From the Miners' Strike 1984–85. London: Bluecoat, 2024. Photographs by Prince, Chris Killip, John Sturrock, John Harris, Jenny Matthews, Roger Tiley, Imogen Young, and Philip Winnard. ISBN 9781908457905. With an introduction by Isaac Blease, an afterword by Martin Parr, essays by Blease, Parr, Siân James, and transcripts of interviews by Phillipa Kelly.

== Exhibitions ==
=== Group exhibitions ===
- Striking Women: Communities & Coal, The Photographers' Gallery, London, September–October 1985. With work by Prince, Izabela Jedrzejczyk, and Imogen Young.
- Photographing Protest: Resistance through a Feminist Lens, Four Corners Gallery, London, March–May 2022
- Women in Revolt!, Tate Britain, London, November 2023 – April 2024, then toured to National Galleries of Scotland, 2024, and The Whitworth, Manchester, 2025
- One Year! Photographs from the Miners' Strike 1984/85, Martin Parr Foundation, Bristol, January–March 2024
- The 80s: Photographing Britain, Tate Britain, London, November 2024 – May 2025

== Collections ==
Prince's work is held in the following permanent collections:

- Bishopsgate Institute, London (The Brenda Prince Archive)
- National Portrait Gallery, London
