= Cornerhouse =

Former arts centre (gallery, cinemas) in Manchester, England

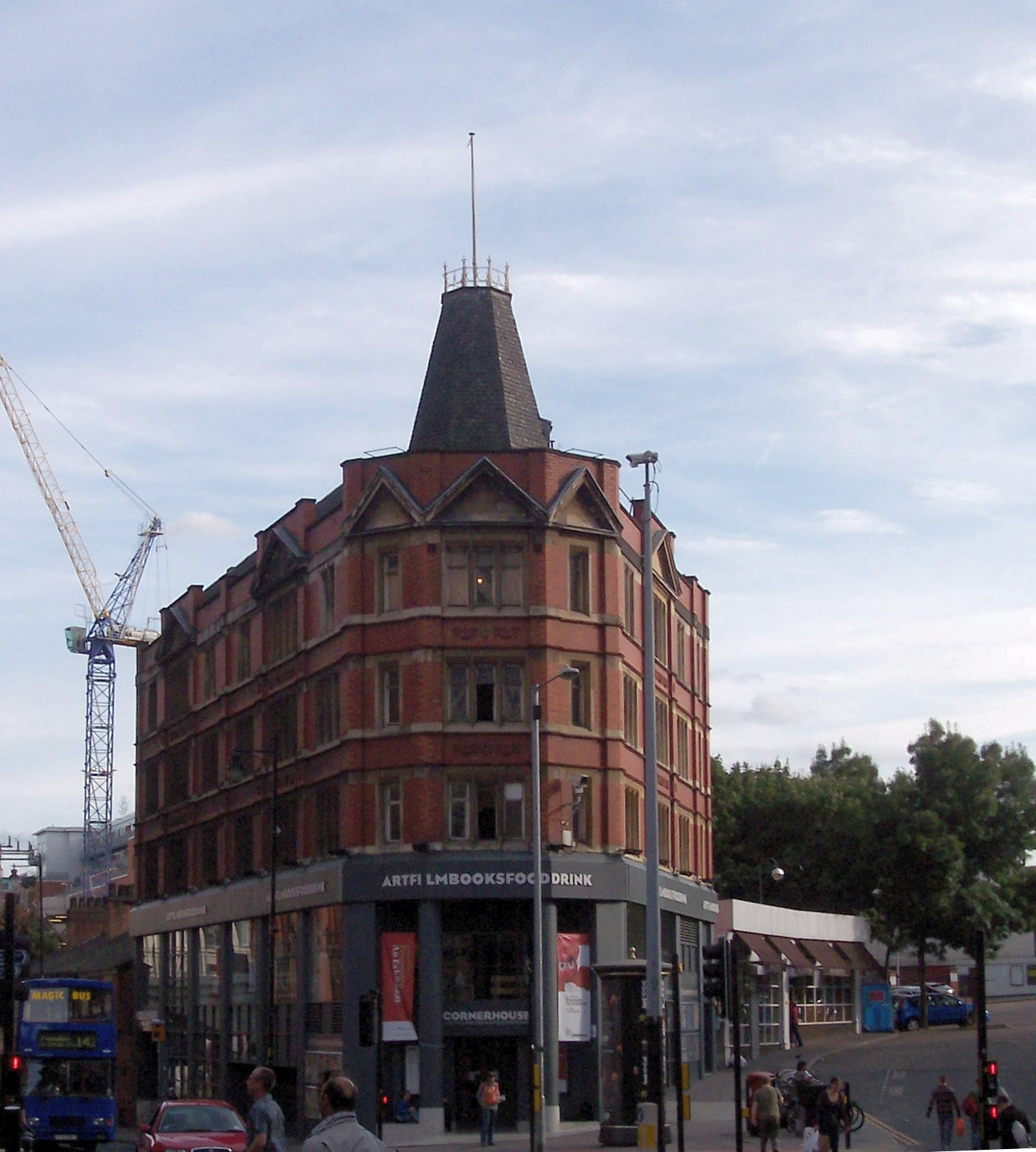
- Location: Oxford Street, Manchester, England
- Coordinates: 53°28′27.50″N 2°14′28″W

Construction
- Opened: 1985
- Closed: 2015

Cornerhouse was a cinema and contemporary visual arts centre next to Oxford Road Station on Oxford Street, Manchester, England, from 1985 to 2015. It had three floors of art galleries, three cinemas, a bookshop, bar and café. Cornerhouse was operated by Greater Manchester Arts Centre Ltd, a registered charity.

== The buildings ==
Cornerhouse occupied two buildings. The main building, 70 Oxford Street, was built for John Shaw in the early 1900s and was a furniture store run by the family until it closed in 1985. The building on the other side of the approach to Oxford Road station was designed by Peter Cummings, was completed in 1934 and opened as a cinema, Tatler News Theatre, in May 1935. The cinema had numerous name changes (Essoldo, Tatler Classic, Tatler Cinema Club) before closing in 1981.

== History ==
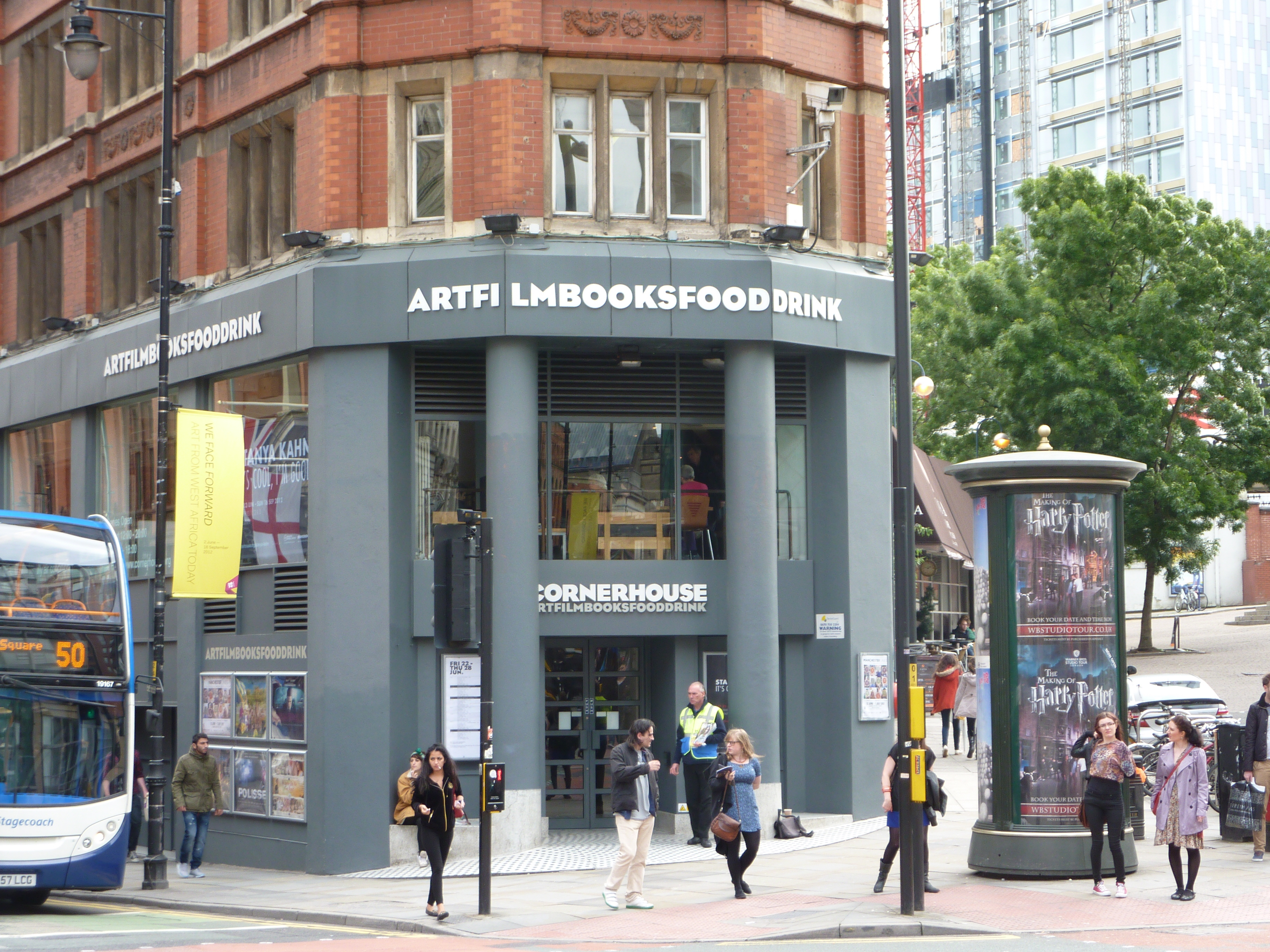
Outside the main entrance of Cornerhouse, June 2012

Cornerhouse was conceived by the Greater Manchester Visual Arts Trust, chaired by Sir Bob Scott. It opened with the support of the then Greater Manchester County Council and Manchester City Council, North West Arts Association (now part of Arts Council England) and the British Film Institute.

Cornerhouse's first director was Dewi Lewis, who had previously been director of Bury Metro Arts. The building opened on 3 October 1985. The first film screened (on 18 October) was Nic Roeg's Insignificance. Dave Moutrey was director and CEO from 1998 until 2024.

Since its inception, Cornerhouse has hosted the UK premiere of Quentin Tarantino's Reservoir Dogs and was the first UK public gallery to commission work from Damien Hirst.

In 2012, it was announced that Cornerhouse would merge with the Library Theatre Company to form HOME. In 2015, both organisations moved to new premises at the HOME centre.

From March 2017 to August 2017, the vacant Cornerhouse Cinema building was squatted by the Loose Space Collective before being evicted.

== Programme ==
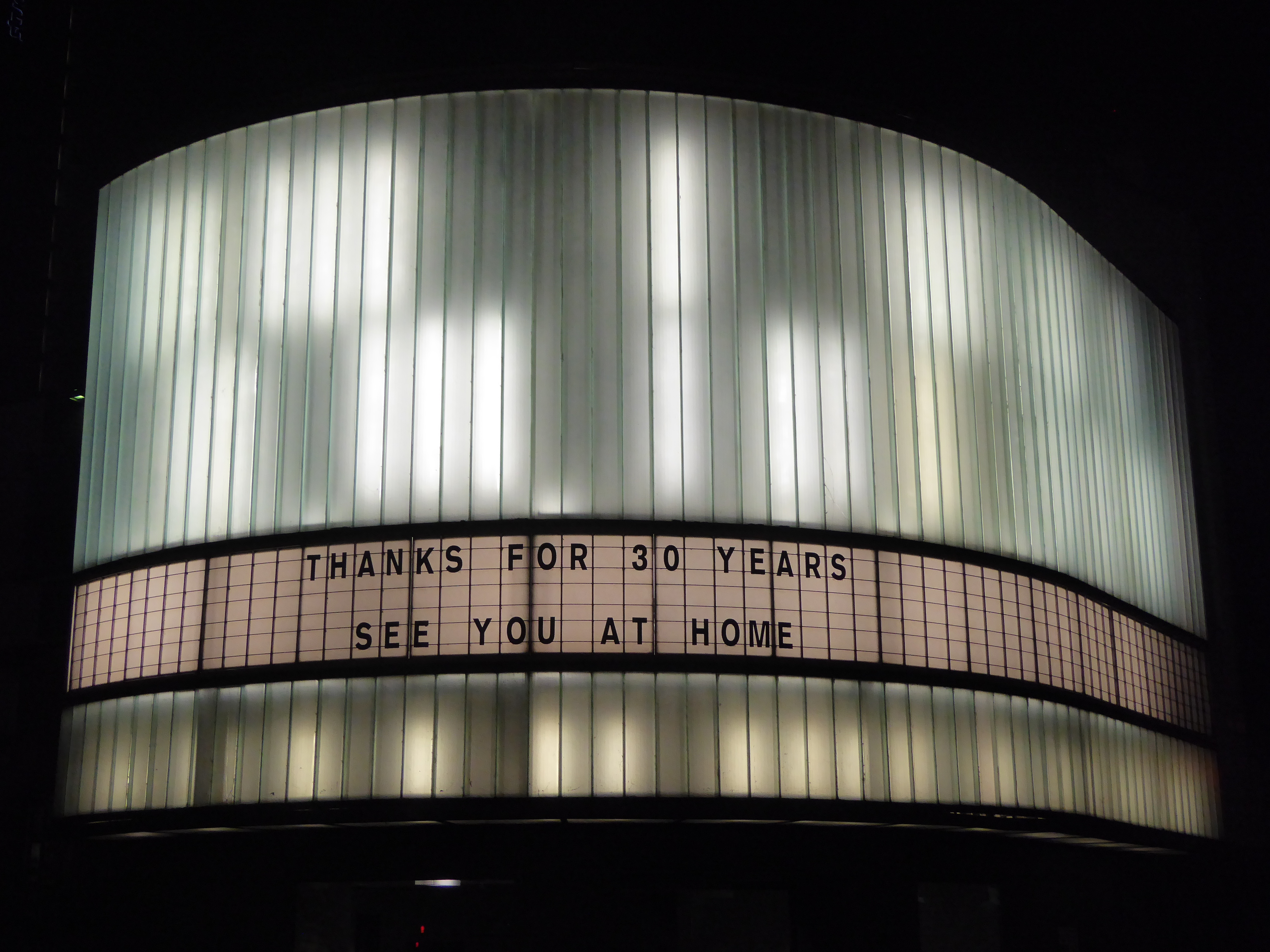
The main cinema building in its last week of operation prior to re-opening in a new location as HOME - a joint venture with the Library Theatre Company, April 2015

The Cornerhouse offered independent cinema, and contemporary art in the galleries. Cornerhouse's contemporary visual art programme was dedicated to launching artists who had not received major institutional recognition in Britain. It also let mid-career artists realise new projects in commissions and exhibitions on and off-site. The visual arts programme presented works in all media, with an emphasis on film and video that has a strong link with the film programme.

Cornerhouse produced or co-produced all of its exhibitions as well as a programme for each show. A regular feature of its visual arts programme was international group exhibitions which explored socio-political concerns. In 2011, Cornerhouse launched Artist Film, a project for the production and distribution of longer films, starting with Gillian Wearing's Self Made. Cornerhouse was a partner in the plus Tate programme.

On average, 30 titles were screened across the three screens every month. The cinemas were open seven days a week, with daily matinée and evening performances (no matinées on Monday), making a total of almost 3,500 screenings annually.

Cornerhouse's film programme was international in scope and offered new and innovative film and video alongside more familiar work. This resulted in the screening of new films and re-releases; second runs of overlooked or underrated titles; classic and archive material; shorts, animation and documentary; avant garde film and television; and foreign language films. Alongside a variety of touring film programmes, Cornerhouse also ran two festivals every year ¡Viva! Spanish (Note: The ¡Viva! Spanish website is here.) and Latin American Film Festival and exposures. (Note: The exposures website is here.)

== Books ==
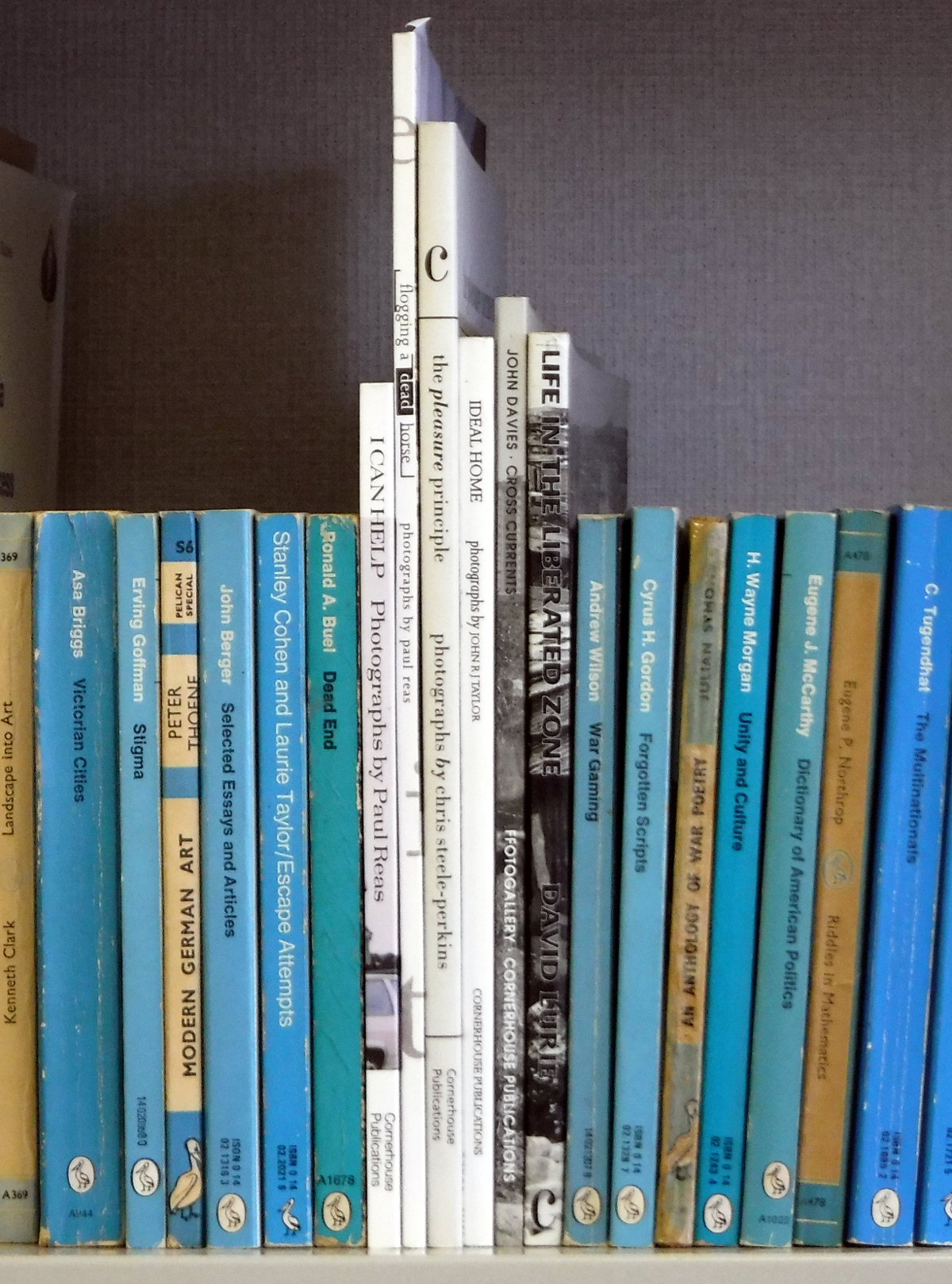
Photobooks by John Davies, David Lurie, Paul Reas, Chris Steele-Perkins and John R J Taylor, all published by Cornerhouse

In 1987, Dewi Lewis launched the Cornerhouse Publications imprint with A Green and Pleasant Land by John Davies. Cornerhouse Publications was joint winner of The Sunday Times Small Publisher of The Year Award in 1990. The imprint continued to be active until 1994 and over the period published books by many major international photographers. (Note: As examples: Chris Steele-Perkins, The Pleasure Principle (1989, ISBN 0948797509); Nick Waplington, Living Room (1991, ISBN 0948797568); Bruce Gilden, Facing New York (1992, ISBN 094879707X); Richard Misrach and Susan Sontag, Violent Legacies (1992, ISBN 0948797274); Robert Frank, The Americans, new ed. (1993, ISBN 0948797835, ISBN 0948797827).)
