= Fitzroy Place, London =

London building

Coordinates: 51.5190°N 0.1379°W

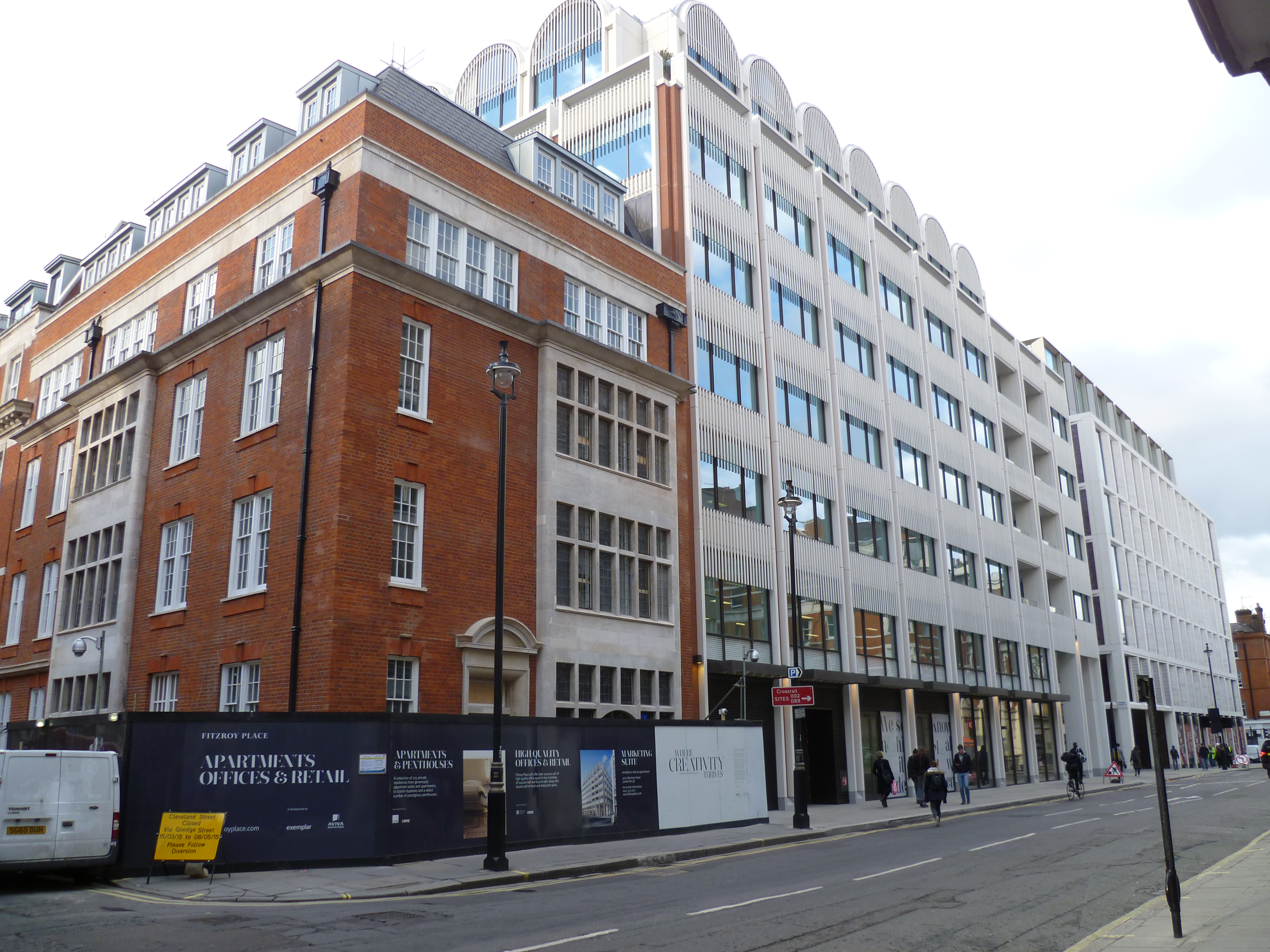
Fitzroy Place

Fitzroy Place is an office, residential and retail estate in Fitzrovia, London. With 289 homes, interiors designed by Johnson Naylor, and 220,000 square feet (20,000 m^{2}) of office space, Fitzroy Place houses a series of shops, restaurants, offices and community spaces set around a publicly accessible central square. The square, which was the first new garden square in the W1 area for 100 years, incorporates the Grade II* listed Fitzrovia Chapel.

Developed from the former Middlesex Hospital site in the 2000s, it was originally to be known as Noho Square, presumably a backformation from 'North' i.e. north of Oxford Street, as if Soho (located south of Oxford St) were derived from 'South'. The name, chosen by early investors the Candy brothers, was widely disliked.

Redevelopment was halted by the Great Recession, as an Icelandic bank was the biggest shareholder, but the project was taken on by Aviva Investors and Exemplar Properties, who subsequently sold their stake to AshbyCapital. The NoHo Square name was dropped and the scheme became known as Fitzroy Place.

The offices at 2 Fitzroy Place are let to multiple tenants, with 12,866 square feet (1,195.3 m^{2}) available on the fourth floor, while 1 Fitzroy Place is fully let to cosmetics firm Estée Lauder. Retail and restaurant tenants include Percy & Founders and Detox Kitchen.

== History ==
A Guernsey-based consortium of the Icelandic Kaupthing Bank, the Candy brothers' CPC Group (33%) and Richard Caring (10%) bought the 3-acre (12,000 m^{2}) Middlesex site from University College London Hospitals NHS Foundation Trust for £175m in June 2006. The demolition was completed in late 2008. When Kaupthing went into administration, the Candys swapped their stake in NoHo Square for Kaupthing's share of another joint development in Beverley Hills.

The project was being carried out by Ken Shuttleworth's agency 'Make' alongside developers 'Project Abbey', with developers Candy and Candy handling the fit-out.

Kaupthing rejected a bid worth £60m from Ian and Richard Livingstone’s London & Regional Properties. In March 2010 Kaupthing appointed CB Richard Ellis to sell their remaining stake.

Aviva Investors and Exemplar Properties acquired the site in July 2010.

The consortium appointed architects Lifschutz Davidson Sandilands and Sheppard Robson to design a new masterplan with luxury residential and office buildings. The scheme gained planning consent in March 2012, with Fitzroy Place completed in 2015. In 2016, AshbyCapital purchased a 50% stake in the development from Kaupthing.

The residential part is managed by Rendall & Rittner. It consists of three buildings with 289 multi-million pound apartments.
