= David Lurie =

South African photographer (born 1951)

- Born: 1951; Cape Town, South Africa
- Education: University of Cape Town
- Occupation: Photographer
- Website: www.davidlurie.co.uk

David Lurie (born 1951) is a South African photographer, living and working in Cape Town. Lurie has exhibited in the United Kingdom, Europe, the United States, Australia, South Africa and the Middle East.

== Life and career ==
Born in Cape Town in 1951, Lurie studied economics, politics and philosophy at the University of Cape Town, and graduated with a BA Honours degree. He went on to teach philosophy at the University before moving to the London School of Economics in London in 1980, where he undertook research at the Department of International Relations. From 1985, he worked as a consultant economist in London.

In 1990, Lurie, self-taught in photography, began taking on documentary projects part-time. This became his full-time job in 1995, following the publication of his first book Life in the Liberated Zone.

== Books ==
- Life in the Liberated Zone. Manchester: Cornerhouse, 1994. ISBN 0948797282.
- Cape Town Fringe: Manenberg Avenue is where it's happening. Cape Town: Double Storey, 2004. ISBN 1919930728.
- Images of Table Mountain. Cape Town: Bell-Roberts, 2006. ISBN 0620360453.

== Exhibitions ==
- South African Photographs: 1990 (toured UK)
- Working the Surface of the Earth: 1990 (Group show)
- Bitter Harvest: 1992 (UK, Europe, US, South Africa)
- Portfolio Gallery, London (with Omar Badsha and David Goldblatt) (1992)
- Life in the Liberated Zone: 1993 (UK, Europe, US, South Africa)
- Crisis in South Africa's Health Services: 1994 (UK)
- After Apartheid: South Africa's black middle class: 1995 (US tour, with Life in the Liberated Zone, commissioned by the Getty Center, Los Angeles)
- Struggling to Share the Promised Land: 2001-2 (UK, Germany, Bahrain, South Africa)
- Offside: Cape Town 2010 at the AVA Gallery, Cape Town, on the peripheries of Cape Town society. "This selection of photographs deconstructs and explores the irony and inherent contradictions promulgated by the media that has turned a blind eye to the realities of poverty, mass inequality and xenophobia in order to line the pockets of the chosen few."
- The Right To Refuge, with supporting text by Steven Robins and poetry by Patricia Schonstein, Cape Town Holocaust Centre, 2010.

== Collections ==
- Iziko South African National Gallery
- Side Gallery (Newcastle upon Tyne)
- Getty Center (Los Angeles)
- Black Gallery (Los Angeles)

== Awards ==
- Pictures of the Year International
- The World Understanding Award for Cape Town Fringe: Manenberg Avenue is where it’s happening
- Arts Council of Great Britain grant awards
