= Fergus Greer =

Photographer, Fashion, Art, Portraiture

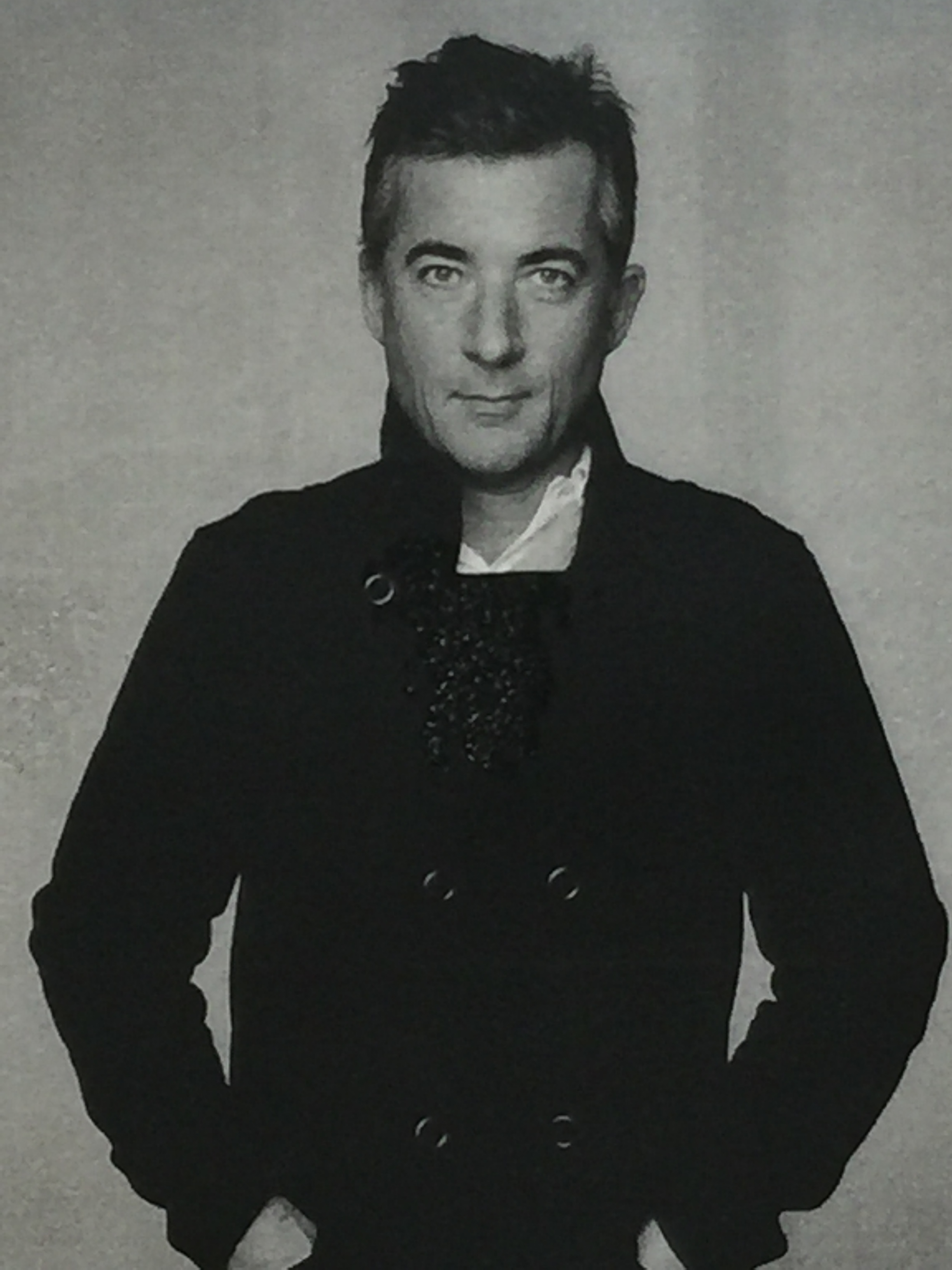
- London, 2012
- Born: 8 May 1961 (age 65); Aldershot, England
- Education: St. Martin's School of Art, London; Royal Military Academy Sandhurst
- Occupations: Photographer, psychotherapist
- Years active: 1987–present
- Spouse: Katya Caminda m.1996-div.2010
- Children: Ludmilla, Balthazar

Fergus James MacGregor Greer (born 8 May 1961) is a British-Irish internationally renowned photographer and psychotherapist, known for his strong visual and emotional resonance in his large body of work. He served as an officer in the Irish Guards before leaving to pursue a successful career in photography and, later, in psychotherapy. His work has been featured in numerous publications and exhibitions and held in many public and private collections, including 87 works at the National Portrait Gallery, London and 5 works at the Tate Gallery, London.

== Early life and education ==
Greer was born on 8 May 1961, in Aldershot, Hampshire. His family moved to Ireland in 1970 but returned to the UK in 1976. After leaving school, he went on to study at St Martin's School of Art, London. He then attended Royal Military Academy Sandhurst, passing out in 1983.

== Career ==
=== The Irish Guards ===
After graduating from Sandhurst, and following in the footsteps of a number family members who had served in Irish Regiments, Greer was commissioned as an officer into the Irish Guards. He served for four years.

=== Photography ===
After leaving the army in 1987, Greer began his career in photography as a studio assistant to a number of photographers, including Richard Avedon, soon becoming Terence Donovan's full-time studio manager and assistant. In 1988 he met the performance artist and designer Leigh Bowery, with whom he established a fruitful working collaboration that ended when Bowery died in 1994. One of Greer's images of Bowery was listed in The Guardian in 2023 as one of the 40 most outrageous photographs to have changed fashion. During this time Greer was also developing his freelance photographic career with commercial and private commissions and with a variety of magazines. He regularly shot covers for The Sunday Times Magazine, Vanity Fair, Fortune, The New York Times Magazine, and The New Yorker.

Greer relocated to Los Angeles in 1997 to expand his international reputation and career as a portrait photographer. His list of sitters encompasses royalty, artists, actors, musicians, writers, politicians, businesspeople, academics, and athletes. His work has been recognised with two solo exhibitions at the National Portrait Gallery, London in 2001 and 2006. The gallery holds many of Greer's portraits, including:

- Prince William and Prince Harry
- Margaret Thatcher
- David Cameron
- Gordon Brown
- Kevin Keegan
- Simon Cowell
- Malcolm McDowell
- Annie Leibovitz
- The Sex Pistols
- Bill Gates
- Quentin Crisp
- David Bowie
- Ray Winstone
- Michael Caine
- Robbie Williams
- John Peel
- Thom Gunn
- Mike Leigh
- Julie Christie
- Tom Stoppard
- Simon Sebag Montefiore
- Vivienne Westwood
- Brian Cox
- Steve Coogan
- Hugh Grant
- Caroline Aherne
- Damien Hirst

In 1999, Greer was appointed as the official war artist for the Kosovo campaign and was embedded with his old regiment, the Irish Guards. He published his work in 2001 in the book Kosovo, with a foreword by General Mike Jackson, who had led the campaign. One of the photographs from the book is now in the collection at the National Portrait Gallery, London.

In December 2006, when Greer came back to live in the UK, he was commissioned by Clarence House to return to Sandhurst to photograph Prince William and Prince Harry. The informal double portrait was taken in the Commandant's House and was supposed to be used at the Concert for Diana in 2007; however, it was never published. The photograph was seen publicly for the first time in 2011 at an exhibition at the National Portrait Gallery, London. Vanity Fair suggested that this portrait was the start of "a new dress-code option: royal casual."

The interest in the "most remarkable portfolio of work" with Leigh Bowery has been enduring. In 2002, Greer published a collection of photos in the book Leigh Bowery Looks. Greer's photos of Bowery have featured in numerous exhibitions over the years. In 2019 the Michael Hoppen Gallery in London hosted the exhibition "Fergus Greer, Leigh Bowery, Looks". One review of the exhibition says, "Half a century later, London feels more grey and colorless than ever. We'll never see Bowery again in the flesh: his true medium. But Greer's vital document lives on: a blueprint for a new generation of club kids and freaks tracing their evolution." The online art magazine Dazed Digital said, "Greer photographed Bowery in what have become some of the most richly classic and culturally important portraits of the artist to date. The permanent relevance of Greer's images is found in the way they have culturally preserved the icon."

Greer's photographs were extensively used in the major retrospective exhibition "Leigh Bowery!" at the Tate Modern, which opened in February 2025. The Independent comments that the photographs are "brilliant". The National Portrait Gallery owns 17 of these photographs, including:

- Leigh Bowery (Session 1/ Look 2)
- Leigh Bowery (Session 2/Look 10)
- Leigh Bowery (Session 3/Look 11)
- Leigh Bowery (Session 4/Look 17)
- Leigh Bowery (Session 6/Look 31)
- Leigh Bowery (Session 7/Look 35)

Tate Britain have recently acquired 5 of Greer's photographs of Leigh Bowery and these will feature in their upcoming exhibition, "The 90s: Fashion and Art", which opens on 8th October 2026.

=== Psychotherapy ===
As a continuation of his interest in the human condition and his search for the "truth" while making photographic portraits, Greer trained as an adult psychotherapist at The Westminster Pastoral Foundation between 2010 and 2015. Since 2012 he has worked as a psychotherapist for the NHS, firstly in Hackney and then at Guys Hospital, London.

In 2015, Greer co-founded The Courtyard Garden Clinic and The Ebury Practice in London, from where he practices privately.

== Exhibitions ==
Over the years Greer has contributed photographs to many exhibitions around the world, including:-

- 1993 Heartbeat of Fashion, Haus der Fotographie, F C Gundlach, Hamburg
- 1994 A Positive View, Saatchi Gallery, London
- 1995 Avedon My God, The Photographers' Gallery, London
- 1997 In Memorandum to Leigh Bowery, Fine Art Society, London
- 1997 Print Circle, The Photographers' Gallery, London
- 1998 Addressing the Century: 100 years of Art and Fashion, The Hayward Gallery, London
- 1999 Look at Me, RMIT Gallery, Melbourne
- 2001 Film Directors: Photographs by Fergus Greer, National Portrait Gallery, London
- 2002 Fergus Greer/Leigh Bowery, ICA, London
- 2003 Take a Bowery, Museum of Contemporary Art, Sydney
- 2005 Leigh Bowery-Useless Man, Perry Rubenstein Gallery, New York
- 2005 Leigh Bowery, 51st Venice Biennale (Curated by Rosa Martinez), Venice
- 2006 Taboo, British School at Rome, Rome
- 2006 The Secret Public, Kunstverein, Munich
- 2006 Fergus Greer and Leigh Bowery, NRW, Düsseldorf
- 2006 Into Me/Out of Me, KW, Berlin
- 2006 Photographer In Focus, Fergus Greer, National Portrait Gallery, London
- 2007 Leigh Bowery, Domus Artium, Salamanca
- 2007 Fergus Greer, Guernsey Arts, Guernsey
- 2008 Leigh Bowery, Gallerie Albrecht, Munich – Kunstverein Hannover
- 2009 Gay Icons, National Portrait Gallery, London
- 2010 Leigh Bowery and Other Butterflies, Contemporary Fine Arts, Berlin – Koster Fine Art Gallery, Amsterdam – Loftgalerie, Berlin – Heiner Bastian Gallery, Berlin
- 2011 The Actress Now, National Portrait Gallery, London
- 2012 Model Behaviour, ICA, London
- 2012 About Leigh Bowery, Camera 16 Contemporary Art, Milan
- 2012 No fashion, please!, Kunsthalle Wien, Vienna * 2014 Taboo or Not Taboo, NGV, Victoria
- 2014 Real and Surreal, Staley Wise Gallery, New York
- 2017 The Unflinching Gaze, Bathurst Regional Art Gallery, New South Wales
- 2019 Airpad 2019, Pier 94, New York
- 2019 Gossamer, Carl Freedman Gallery, Margate
- 2019 Less is a Bore: Maximalist Art & Design, ICA, Boston
- 2019 Fergus Greer:Leigh Bowery, Looks, Michael Hoppen Gallery, London
- 2022 Tell Them I Have Gone to Papua New Guinea, Fitzrovia Chapel, London
- 2023 Centre d'Art Contemporain, Genève – Chrysalis: The Butterfly Dream
- 2024 Outlaws: Fashion Renegades of 80s London, Fashion and Textile Museum, London
- 2024 Paris Photo 2024, Grand Palais, Paris
- 2025 Leigh Bowery!, Tate Modern, London
- 2026 Suspects: Van Gogh, Tricksters & Co, Fondation Vincent van Gogh, Arles
- 2026 Cocktail Prolongé: F.C. Gundlac Special, Deichtorhallen, Hamburg
- 2026 The 90s: Fashion and Art, Tate Britain, London
- 2026 Icons and Image Makers, Chanel Nexus Hall, Tokyo

== Books ==
Greer is the author of several books, including:

- Kosovo: The Balkans War, 2001
- Leigh Bowery Looks, 2002
- Portraits: The World's Top Photographers, 2004
