= Jonathan Worth (photographer) =

British photographer

Jonathan Worth is a British portrait photographer and educator. He has worked for The New York Times, New Scientist magazine, Universal Music and Vogue amongst others. His shot-list includes musicians, sports stars and Hollywood actors like Jude Law, Colin Firth and Casey Affleck. In 2009 Worth pioneered two free and open undergraduate photography classes at Coventry University for which he was made a Higher Education Authority National Teaching Fellow. He is a fellow of the Royal Society for the encouragement of Arts, Manufactures and Commerce (RSA).

== Life and work ==
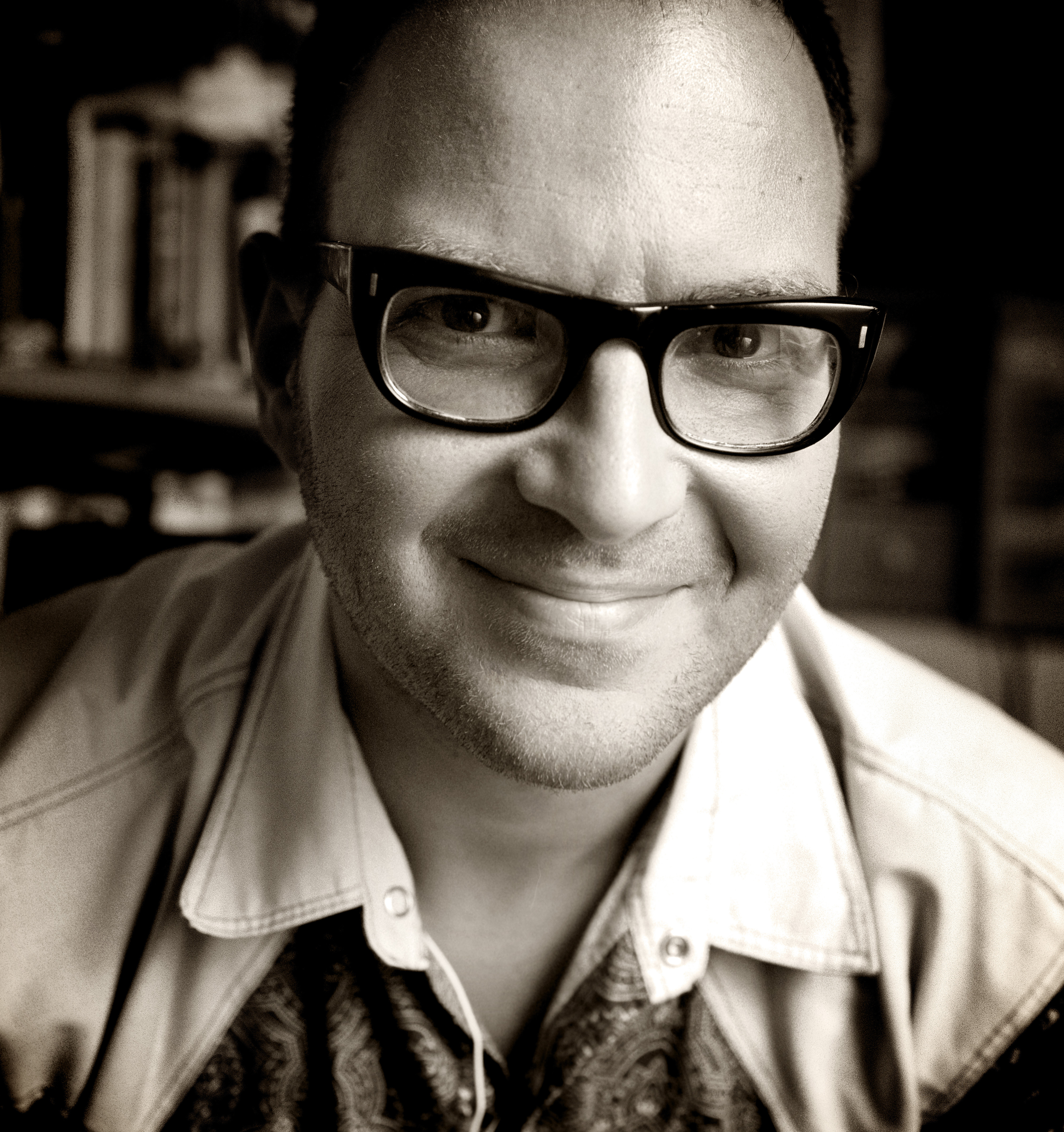
Cory Doctorow, photographed by Worth

After leaving college, Worth assisted portrait photographer Steve Pyke for a number of years both in the UK and New York.

In 2000 he was selected as one of Photo District News's "30 under 30".

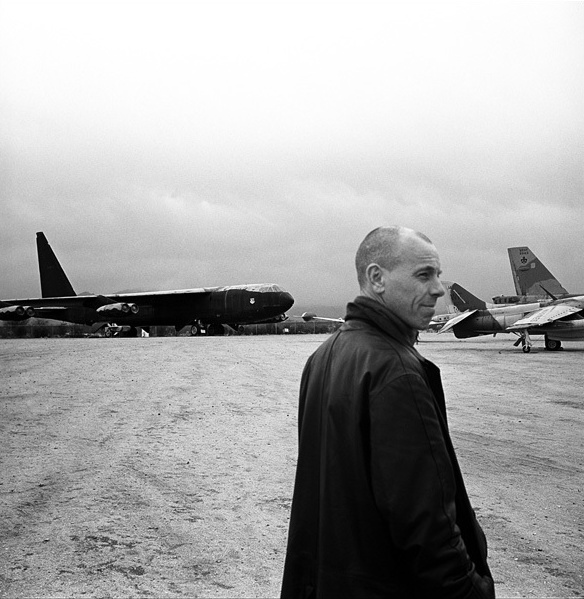
Steve Pyke, photographed by Worth

In 2009 Worth pioneered two open and free undergraduate photography classes called #picbod (Picturing the Body) and #phonar (Photography and Narrative). These classes have drawn large audiences and notable people including Elinor Carucci, Pete Brook and David Campbell. In 2010 the world's first free 'class application' was launched on iPhone for the #picbod class. These open classes have brought Worth significant attention from photography academics and external organizations, in 2013 he was made a Higher Education Academy National Teaching Fellow for developing "a radically new approach to teaching, which magnifies the classroom experience through the affordances of social media and networked environments".

In 2010 Worth was made a fellow of the Royal Society for the encouragement of Arts, Manufactures and Commerce (RSA) for "innovation and influential role in developing new business models for photographers using the social web".

== Exhibitions ==
- 1998: Family, iD - European traveling group exhibition.
- 1998: Boys aged 11 to 16, Paul Smith, London.
- 1999: Beyond Price, iD - European traveling group exhibition.
- 2000: John Kobal Portrait award, National Portrait Gallery, London.
- 2000: Thirty Under Thirty, Photo District News – USA traveling group exhibition.
- 2002: Footballers, Paul Smith, Tokyo, Japan.
- 2002: Footballers, Royal Exchange, London.
- 2005: Dancers Part 1, Saltburn, Lancashire.
- 2005: Editorial work 1998–2004, Picture House Gallery, Leicester.
- 2006: Kybosh, Picture House Gallery, Leicester.
- 2007: Darbar – South Asia Musicians, Leicester.
- 2008: Portraits, Thompson's Gallery London.

== Collection ==
Worth's work is held in the following permanent public collection:

- National Portrait Gallery, London.

== Sources ==
- Use the Creative Commons to nurture photojournalists from boingboing
- Jonathan Worth tries out a copy-friendly photography business-experiment from boingboing
- The Digital Media Learning Hub
- 'Free online class shakes up photo education' from Wired Magazine
- Photography and Open Education from BBC
- How the Power of Open can benefit photographers from The Telegraph (Newspaper)
- An Interview With Jonathan Worth
- 'The research lab in your pocket; Apps and the Academy' from the Times Higher Education Magazine
- 'Turn on, Tune in to Phonar' from Professional Photographer Magazine
- An Interview with Jonathan Worth from the Shpilman Institute for Photography
