= Roger Tiley =

Welsh documentary photographer

Roger Tiley (born 1960) is a Welsh documentary photographer. His work on documenting the coal mines of Wales and America has been used extensively in publications. Specifically during the UK miners' strike (1984–1985).

== Life and work ==
Tiley first worked in photography as an industrial photographer for Lucas Industries, a large car component company. He spent four years there and subsequently decided to specialise in documentary photography.

He studied at the School of Documentary Photography under Magnum photographer David Hurn.

On completion of the course in 1984, Tiley worked for a number of national newspapers and magazines, including The Times, The Sunday Times, The Guardian and The Observer. Much of his journalistic work was based on the miners' strike in 1984/1985.

Because of his work on the miners' strike, he was commissioned, along with David Bailey, John Davies (photographer) and Paul Reas to produce "The Valleys Project", a collection of photographs reflecting life in the South Wales Valleys. (Note: A resource on the Valleys Project is available at .) They are meticulously annotated with context information and encompass every part of the miners' lives.

Since the 1980s, Tiley has concentrated on working on commissions for exhibitions, archive collections, television and book publication. Over the past three decades, Tiley has had work exhibited and published regularly in Europe and the US and is the author of three books.

His commissions include photographing the Welsh descendants living in Pennsylvania and covering extensively the mining communities of West Virginia, Kentucky, Virginia, and Tennessee.

He is now a former lecturer in photography, media studies and graphic design at Gower College Swansea, Wales. He has delivered lectures on his photographic practice in the UK and the US. He is also involved in delivering photography workshops on landscape and documentary photography.

Tiley was awarded a commission to photograph the manufactured coast-scape in Wales. For the year-long project He travelled around the coastline of Wales to make photographs of the way the coast line has been adapted to cater for twenty-first-century needs. This included photographing industrial manufacturing plants, the tourism industry and the need for power generation. The work was exhibited in Europe and the UK.

Tiley was the only photographer allowed to photograph underground on the coal face of the last deep coal mine in the UK, Kellingley Colliery in North Yorkshire. This work was commissioned by Keo Films, London, who made a BBC documentary titled 'The Last Miners'. It was also published as a book by 2Ten Books.

Tiley has also produced and directed moving image.

His work has been featured on a number of television and radio features in the UK, Europe and the US.

Tiley worked on a project called Thirty Years Ago, re-visiting the mining communities he photographed thirty years ago and making portraits of former miners, along with people involved in mining today. His work is closely linked to his upbringing in the south Wales valleys. He is very proud of his birthplace. To this day, he supports the miners and feels sad to see the demise of the industrial valleys.

Tiley has exhibited his photographs of Welsh coal mining outdoors at the derelict remains of South Wales coal mines and at Big Pit National Coal Museum at Blaenavon.

Since 2015, after leaving his post as a lecturer in Media and Photography, Tiley has worked on numerous commissioned projects and has worked both in still documentary photography and film. In 2015, Tiley was commissioned by Keo Films, London/BBC, to be the only photographer allowed to capture the last few weeks of the last deep coal mine in the UK - Kellingley Colliery, north Yorkshire. The mine closed on 18 December 2015. A book was produced and sold out within weeks. In 2018, Tiley successfully gained funding to work on a major documentary film project called 'Pride in our Valley'. The film will be premiered in 2020; it follows the lives of people in the upper Dulais Valley in South Wales, UK. Tiley says 'this has been an incredible experience and the community have welcomed me with open arms'.

Roger lives in the village of Ystradgynlais in the Swansea Valley, South Wales. He is married to Angela, an art teacher, and they have one daughter, Rhian, also an art teacher.

== Publications ==
=== Books ===
- Grazing Slateland: Slate Industry on the North Wales Landscape. Ystradgynlais: Incline, 1994. ISBN 978-0952244653.
- Hiraeth: Images of the Brecon Beacons. Brecon: Depa, 1994. ISBN 9780952368304. Photographs by Tiley, text by David Brinn. Edition of 1000 copies.
- Y Cymoedd du: the Black Valley: the Grey Sky. Ystradgynlais: Incline, 1995. ISBN 978-0952244608.
- Tower: Owned by the Miners. Ystradgynlais: Incline, 1998. ISBN 978-0952244615.
- Portraits of Coal Miners – Thirty Years Ago. 2Ten, 2016. OCLC 1063729804.
- Travelling Through Coal Creek. 2Ten, 2016. OCLC 1064926124. With a foreword by Patricia D Beaver and an essay by Tiley.
- Coal Faces Changing Places. 2Ten, 2016. OCLC 1063571993
- The Welsh Industrial Coastline at Night. 2Ten, 2017. ISBN 978-0995706613.
- Last Days at Big K. 2017. ISBN 978-0995706606. With an introduction by Neil Kinnock.
- Let Us Pray Part 1, the South Wales Valleys – Chapel Landscape. 2Ten, 2017. ISBN 978-0-9957066-4-4.
- Let Us Pray Part 2, the South Wales Valleys – Chapel Landscape. 2Ten, 2017. ISBN 978-0-9957066-5-1.

=== Zines ===
- The Valleys: 1980s–1990s: 1. Southport: Café Royal, 2017. Edition of 100 copies.
- The Valleys: 1980s–1990s: 2. Southport: Café Royal, 2017. Edition of 100 copies.

== Group exhibitions ==
- Appalachian Coal Camps, Diffusion 2015: Looking For America, Diffusion: Cardiff International Festival of Photography, The 'Stute, Cardiff, Wales, October 2015. Organised by Ffotogallery.

== Sources ==
- National Library of Wales
- www.rogertiley.com
