= Fitzrovia Chapel =

Church building in London

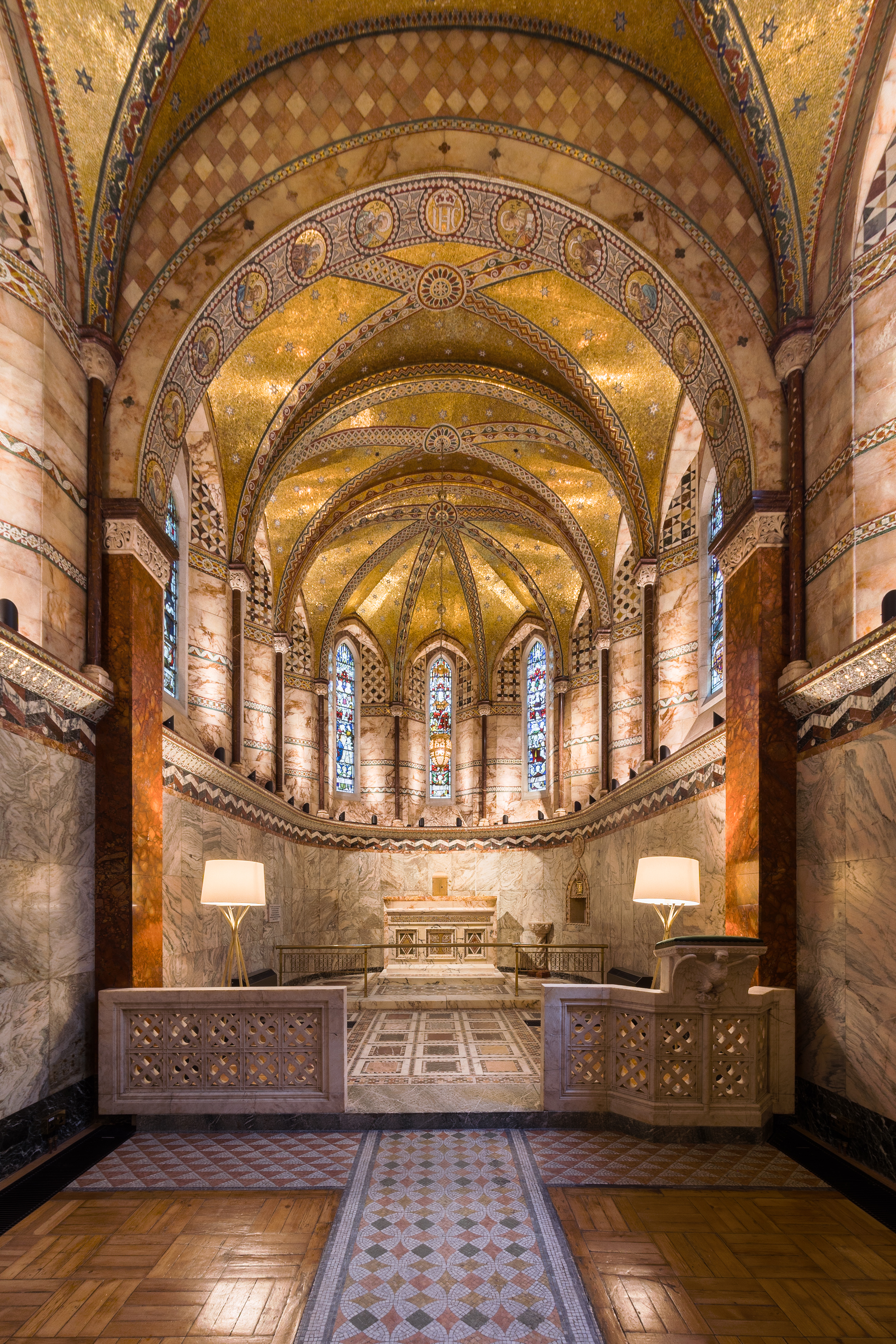
- Fitzrovia Chapel's altar and sanctuary (restored 2017)

- Location in Central London
- 51.5190°N 0.1383°W
- Location: Fitzrovia, London, W1
- Country: England
- Previous denomination: Church of England
- Website: The Fitzrovia Chapel

History
- Former name: Middlesex Hospital Chapel
- Status: Hospital chapel

Architecture
- Functional status: Deconsecrated
- Heritage designation: Grade II*
- Architect: John Loughborough Pearson
- Style: Victorian Gothic
- Years built: 1891–92
- Closed: 2008

The Fitzrovia Chapel is located at Pearson Square, in London's W1 area, standing in the centre of the Fitzroy Place, a development site having boundaries with Mortimer Street, Cleveland Street, Nassau Street and Riding House Street in Fitzrovia, Westminster.

Designed by John Loughborough Pearson RA in the Gothic Revival style with colourful interior decor using mosaics, the chapel was built between 1891 and 1892. The interior was completed 32 years after Pearson's death in 1929, the works being overseen by his son, Frank Loughborough Pearson (1864–1947).

Located in the central courtyard of the former Middlesex Hospital, which was rebuilt between 1929 and 1935 and demolished between 2008 and 2015, the hospital chapel was preserved as a Grade II* listed building and renamed as the Fitzrovia Chapel.

== History ==
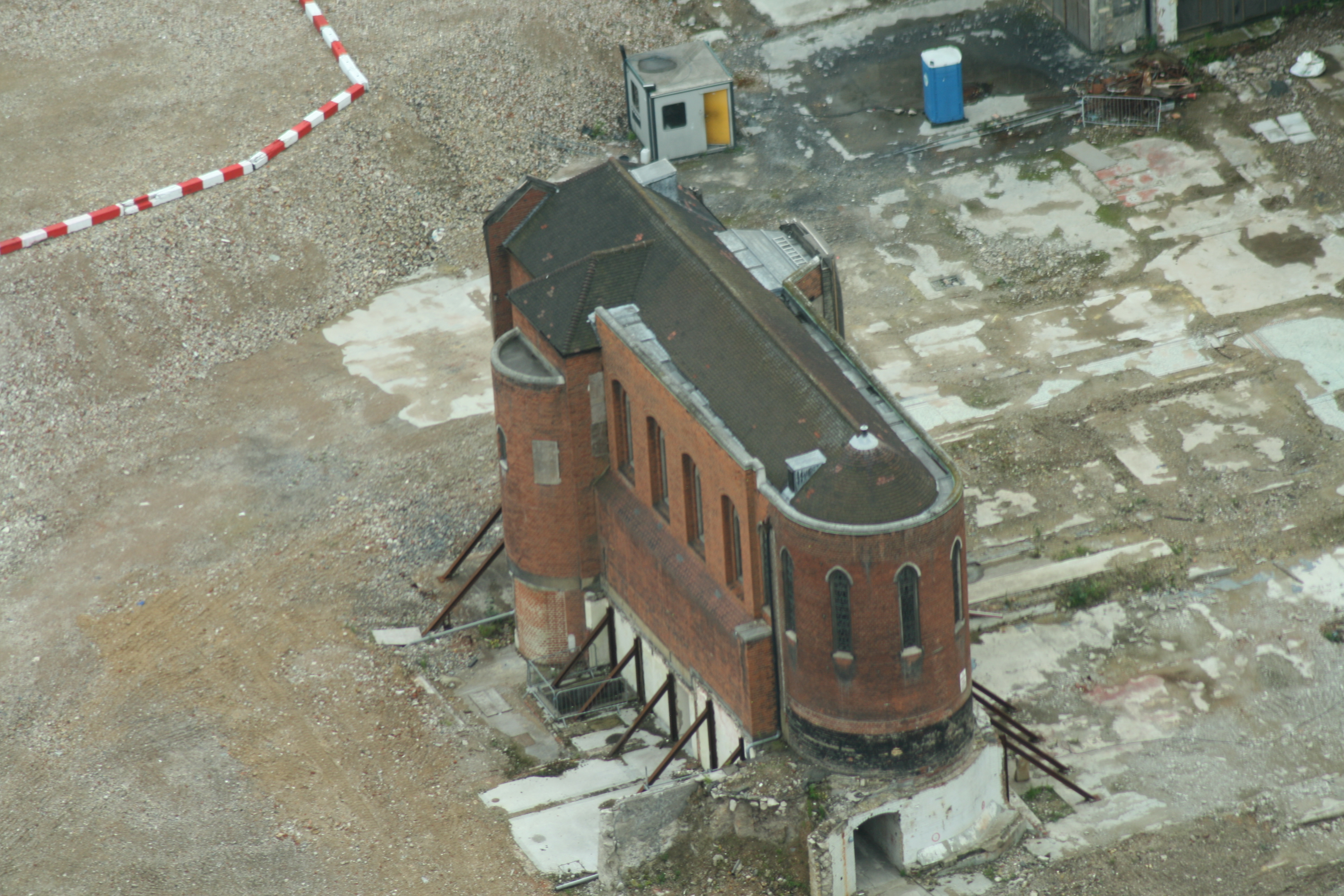
The chapel isolated in 2011 during demolition of the Middlesex Hospital

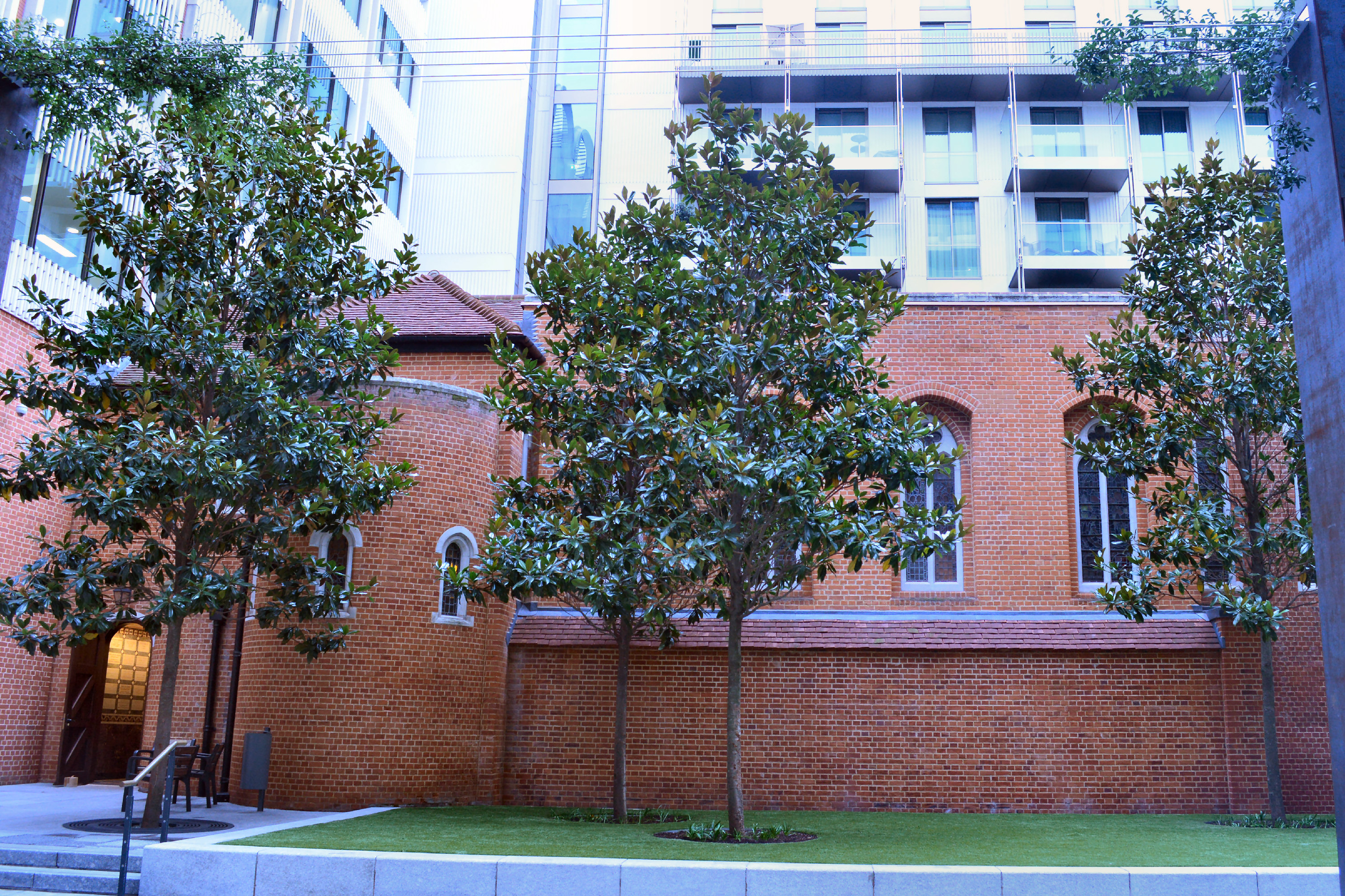
The entrance on Fitzroy Place

The building now known as the Fitzrovia Chapel was built in 1891–92 as the Middlesex Hospital Chapel. Between 1929 and 1935 the decaying 18th-century hospital building was gradually demolished and rebuilt around the chapel.

After the Middlesex Hospital was amalgamated into University College Hospital, its hospital buildings other than the chapel were completely demolished 2008–15, being replaced by a new residential development. The listed structure was preserved throughout the demolition, and today the chapel stands within Pearson Square, a privately owned public space named after the chapel's architect, belonging to Jones Lang LaSalle.

== Architecture ==
The chapel is noted as a fine example of Gothic Revival architecture, designed by John Loughborough Pearson in the Italian Gothic-style. The interior of the chapel features a rib vaulted ceiling richly decorated with polychrome marble and mosaics. The mosaics were completed in the 1930s by Maurice Richard Josey, assisted by his son John Leonard Josey.

The ceiling mosaic depicts blue stars against a gold background representing the firmament. The wall mosaics are lined with green onyx and a zigzag pattern. In the arched chancel there is a Cosmatesque pillar piscina. Set into an ogee arch is an aumbry adorned with an image of the Pelican in her Piety carved in white marble, erected in memory of Prince Francis of Teck, younger brother of Queen Mary, who died in 1910. Set into roundels beneath the arches are sculpted busts of the Twelve Apostles and the Old Testament prophets. The organ gallery at the chapel's west end is surmounted by an arch decorated with a mosaic inscription of words from the Gloria in excelsis Deo:

GLORIA IN EXCELSIS DEO ET IN TERRA PAX HOMINIBUS BONÆ VOLUNTATIS
(GLORY BE TO GOD IN THE HIGHEST AND ON EARTH PEACE TO MEN OF GOODWILL)

The baptismal font is carved from a solid block of green marble and is adorned with the symbols of the Four Evangelists. The inscription, "Nipson anomemata me monan opsin", is a palindrome in Ancient Greek as inscribed on a holy water font outside the Church of Hagia Sophia, Constantinople, in medieval times:

Νίψον ἀνομήματα, μὴ μόναν ὄψιν
(Wash the sins, not only the face)

Unusually, the chapel is aligned approximately on a north–south axis instead of the traditional alignment towards the liturgical east.

=== Interior features ===
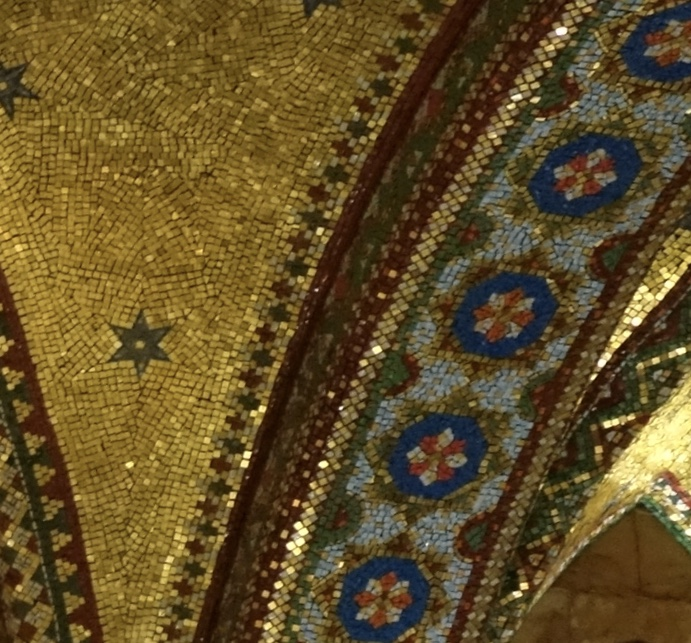
An arch mosaic

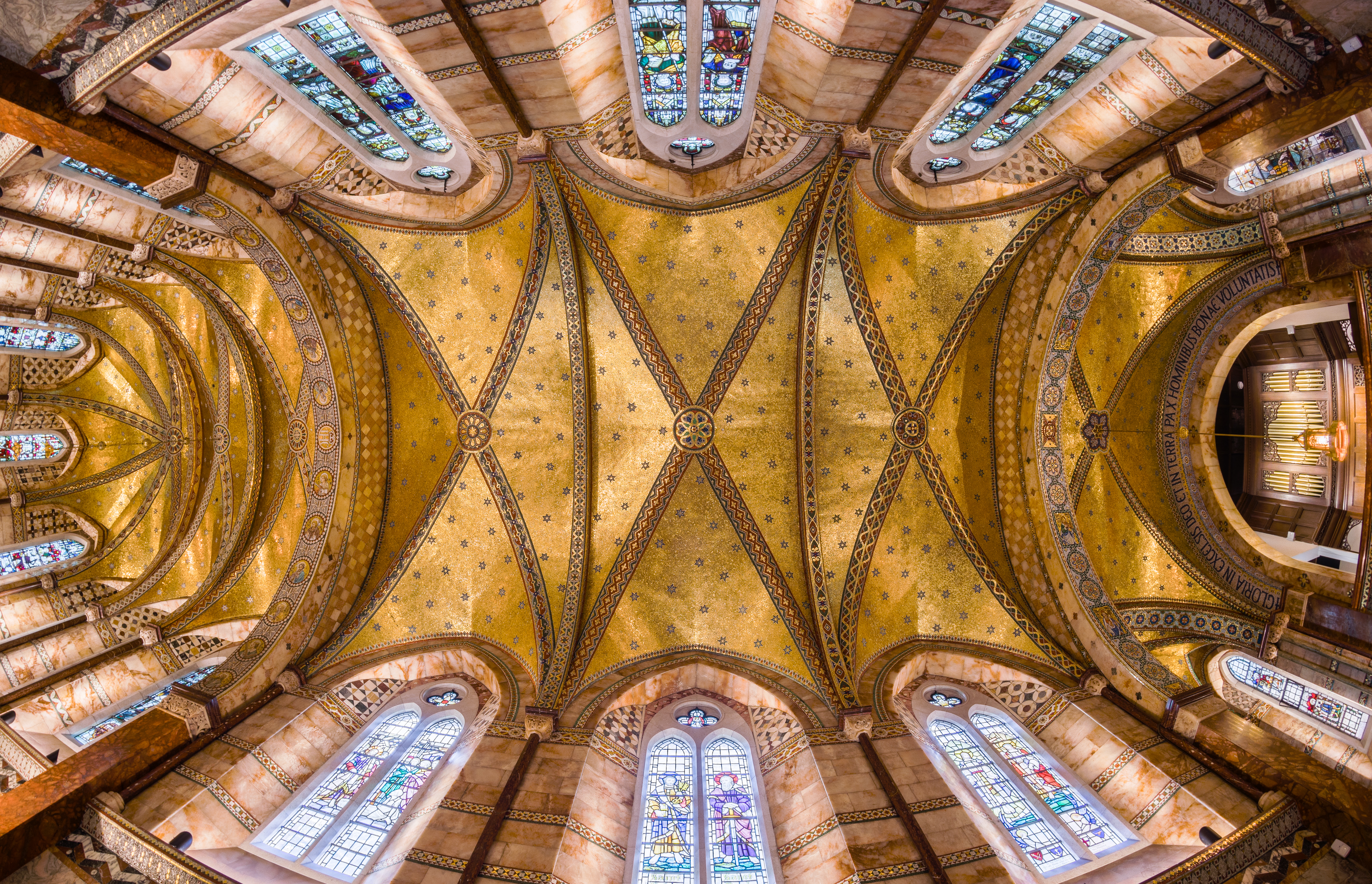
Its fresco

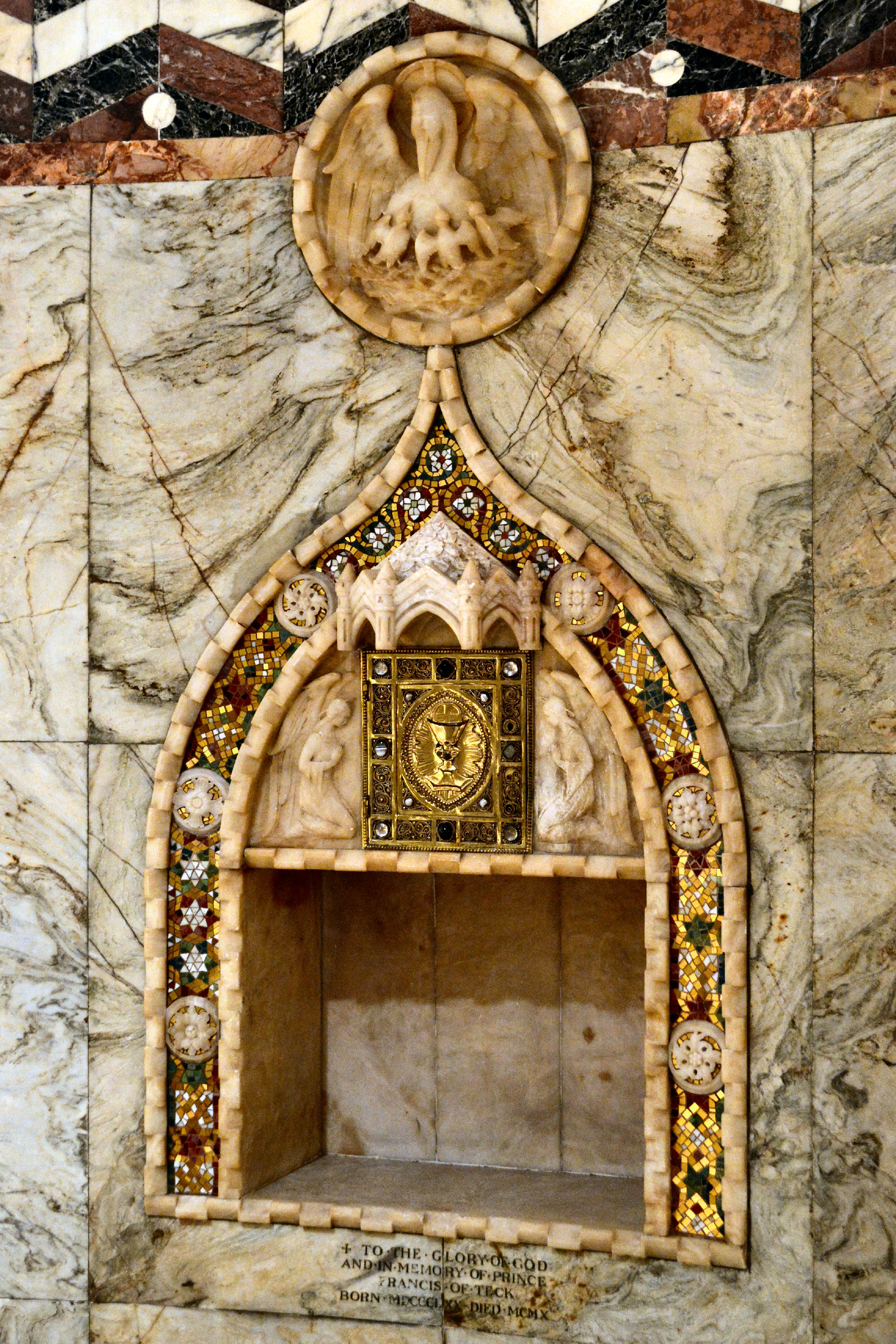
The aumbry

== Notable people commemorated at the Fitzrovia Chapel ==
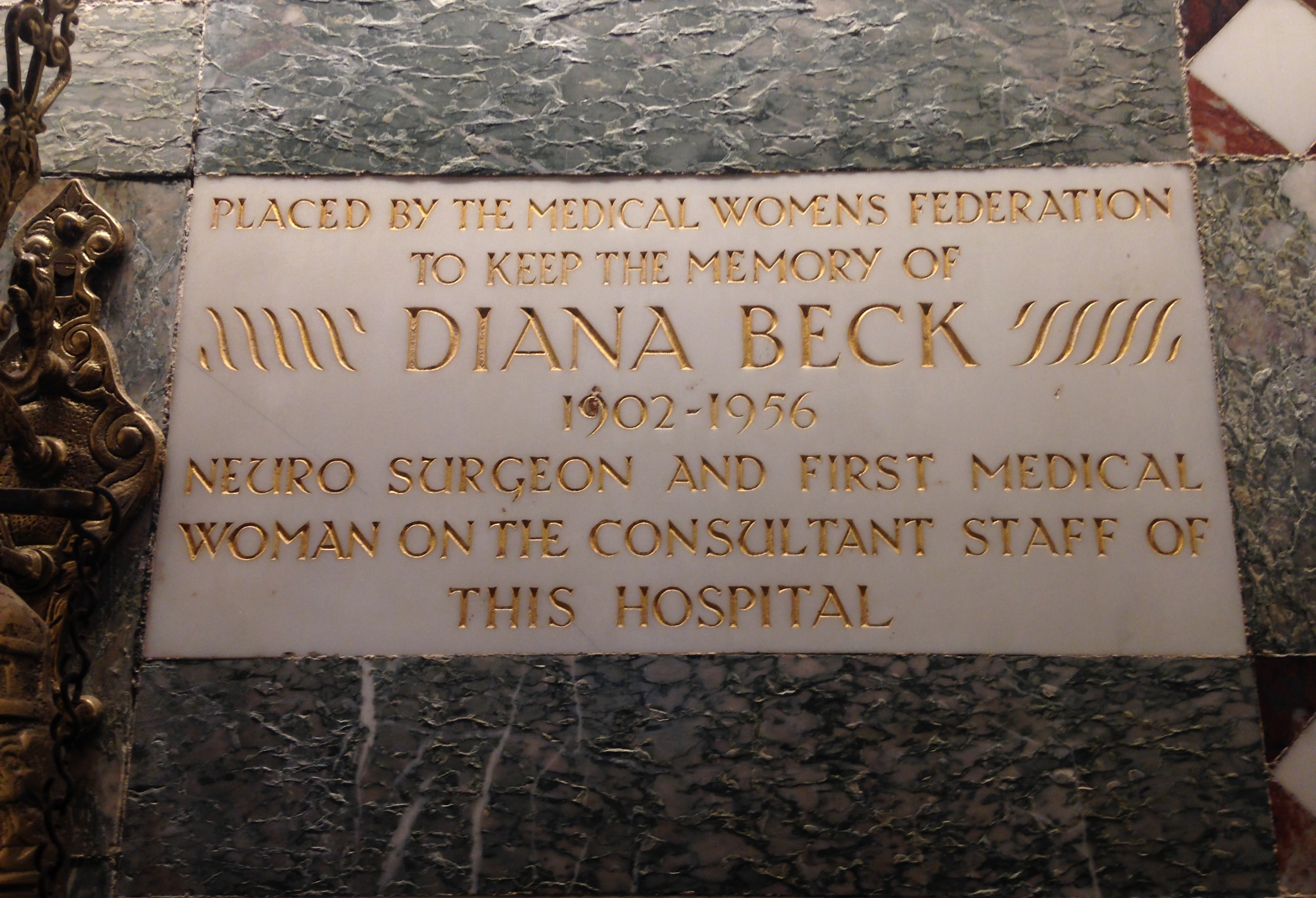
Memorial to Diana Beck at the Fitzrovia Chapel

- Diana Beck, the first female neurosurgeon.
- Rudyard Kipling
- Prince Francis of Teck

== The Fitzrovia Chapel Foundation ==
The Fitzrovia Chapel is managed by a charity, the Fitzrovia Chapel Foundation. It no longer holds worship services but is a venue for weddings and memorials.

=== Exhibitions and events ===
In May 2017 the Horiuchi Foundation presented a series of photographs at the chapel by Tomohiro Muda. The exhibition was called Icons of Time: Memories of the Tsunami that Struck Japan.

The Richard Ingleby Gallery hosted an exhibition during Frieze London in October 2017, including works by David Batchelor, Jonathan Owen, Kevin Harman and Peter Liversidge.

In July 2017 Erskine, Hall & Coe presented Claudi Casanovas's Minvant at the chapel.

The TJ Boulting gallery hosted Stephanie Quayle's Jenga at the Fitzrovia Chapel in 2016 and Siân Davey's Looking for Alice in December 2017.

As part of Frieze London, the Stephen Friedman Gallery has shown works by Yinka Shonibare CBE and Jonathan Baldock at the chapel.

In January 2019 the photographer Richard Ansett presented his portrait of the artist Grayson Perry at the chapel. It was called Birth and depicted Perry's alter ego, Claire.

The Fitzrovia Chapel has been used by recording artists including Katie Melua, Allman Brown and the Vickers Bovey Guitar Duo.

In 2024, King Charles III recorded his Christmas message at the chapel.

==== "The Ward" ====
Leading up to World AIDS Day in 2017, the chapel presented its first exhibition. Called The Ward, it followed the lives of four young men on the Broderip and Charles Bell Wards in the former Middlesex Hospital. The Broderip, the first AIDS ward in London, was opened by Diana, Princess of Wales, in 1987 and was photographed by Gideon Mendel, who chronicled the wards in 1993.

==== "Nina Hamnett - 'Everybody was Furious'" ====
The chapel's exhibition in 2019 focused on the Welsh artist (and former Fitzrovia resident) Nina Hamnett. The exhibition was called Nina Hamnett - 'Everybody was Furious'. It featured pieces from Tenby Museum & Art Gallery, in the town where the artist was born.

==== "Portraits of NHS Heroes" ====
Tom Croft created a virtual exhibition (installed and scanned observing COVID-19 government guidelines) at the Fitzrovia Chapel, showcasing portraits of NHS staff created during the coronavirus crisis. Portraits for NHS Heroes included work by 15 artists, all members of the Contemporary British Portrait Painters.

==== "Tell Them I've Gone to Papua New Guinea" ====
The performance artist Leigh Bowery was celebrated during an exhibition in 2022 which included costumes and video. The Charles Atlas film, The Legend of Leigh Bowery, was included in the show.

==== "Lee Miller: Nurses" ====
The exhibition showed images of nurses taken across Europe by the photographer Lee Miller during the Second World War in May and June 2022. The photographs document nurses in Oxford, on the front in field hospitals in France, and German prisoner-of-war nurses.
