= Paul Seawright =

British artist (born 1965)

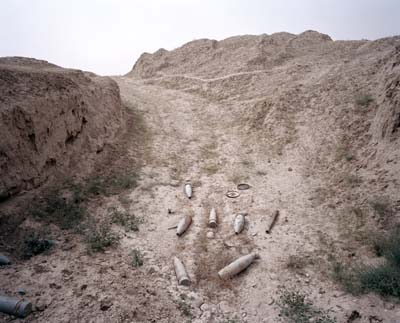
Seawright's Valley, taken in Afghanistan in 2002.

Paul Seawright OBE (born 1965) is a Northern Irish artist. He is the professor of photography and the Deputy Vice Chancellor (previously Executive Dean of Arts, Humanities and Social Sciences at Belfast School of Art) at Ulster University in Belfast/Derry/Coleraine. Seawright lives in his birthplace of Belfast.

== Life and work ==
Seawright gained an art foundation at Ulster University, Belfast; a BA (Hons) in Photography, Film and Video from West Surrey College of Art and Design, where his tutors included Paul Graham and Martin Parr; and a PhD from the University of Wales.

He is best known for his early work from his home city of Belfast, particularly the series Sectarian Murder, 1988. In this series, he photographed the sites of sectarian murders around Belfast, and paired the images with newspaper reports from the period. By removing reference to the victim's religion, he depoliticised the violence, focusing on the extensive civilian losses in the Northern Irish "troubles" (more than two thirds of deaths between 1969 and the ceasefires of 1994 were civilian). He was also the first editor of the Belfast-based photography magazine Source.

More recently, he has made photographs in post-war Afghanistan, urban Africa (Invisible Cities) (Note: Invisible Cities is here in Seawright's website) and America. In 2002, he travelled to Afghanistan, having been commissioned by the Imperial War Museum, London, to respond to the September 11 attacks and the subsequent war against the Taliban. His photographs of minefields and battle sites have been exhibited internationally and are in numerous public collections. His Afghanistan work is included in the Imperial War Museums extensive exhibition of art and conflict, Visions of War: Art of the Imperial War Museums, which opened in November 2023.

In 2005, the Fotomuseum Antwerp exhibited a major survey exhibition of his work with accompanying catalogue Field Notes. (Note: Field Notes is here in Seawright's website.)

Seawright was Dean of Newport School of Art, Media and Design at the University of Wales, Newport. Later he was, and remains (in 2021), professor of photography at Belfast School of Art at Ulster University in Belfast. From 2012 he was head of Belfast School of Art and from 2016 Executive Dean of Arts Humanities and Social Sciences. He was appointed Deputy Vice Chancellor of Ulster University in 2021.He served as a Council member of the Arts Council of Northern Ireland and Vice President of the Royal Ulster Academy of Arts.

Seawright was appointed Officer of the Order of the British Empire (OBE) in the 2020 Birthday Honours for services to higher education and the arts.

== Exhibitions ==
- Hidden, Irish Museum of Modern Art, 2003
- Further, Wales at The 50th Venice Bienalle, 2003
- Naughton Gallery, Queens University Belfast 2006
- Field Notes, National Media Museum, Bradford 2007
- How We Are: Photographing Britain, Tate Britain, London 2007

== Awards ==
- 1997: Irish Museum of Modern Art Glen Dimplex Art Prize
- 2001: Personal chair by the University of Wales.

== Collections ==
- Tate, London
- International Center of Photography New York
- San Francisco Museum of Modern Art
- British Council
- Arts Council of Ireland Collection
- Art Institute of Chicago
- UK Government Art Collection

== Publications ==
=== Publications by Seawright ===
- Death: Selected by Dawn Ades et al. ISBN 0907074332. Cambridge Darkroom Gallery / Kettles Yard Gallery, 1988.
- Valokuvataide Arkitaide. Helsinki, 1989.
- Shocks to the System. Arts Council of Great Britain, London, 1993.
- The Orange Order. Belfast: Arts Council of Northern Ireland, 1993.
- Nervous Landscapes. Southeast Museum of Photography, FL, 1994.
- Inside Information. London: The Photographers' Gallery, London, 1995.
- L'Imaginaire Irlandais. Ecole des Beaux Arts, Paris, 1996.
- Residential. Douglas Hyde Gallery, Dublin, 1997.
- Constructing Identity. (The Missing), Netherlands Photo Museum, Rotterdam, 1997.
- Paul Seawright. Salamanca, Spain: Salamanca University, 2000.
- The Map. Catalogue of public art project, SDCC. Edition of 22000 copies.
- The Forest. Gotenberg, Sweden: Hasselblad Center; Selborne, Hampshire, UK: Shoreditch Bienale, 2001. Edited by Christine Redmond and Val Williams. ISBN 978-9163106316. With a text by Seawright.
- Hidden. London: Imperial War Museum / Bangor Museum of Modern Art, 2003.
- Maintenant: Now. Vincent Levois, Le Mois de la Photo, 2003.
- Gestes, Le Printemps de Septembre Toulouse. Actes Sud, 2003.
- Landscape of War. Centre d'Art la Panera, Spain, 2004.
- Field Notes. Antwerp: Fotomuseum Antwerp, 2005.
- Invisible Cities. Cardiff: Ffotogallery, 2007. ISBN 978-1872771694. Edited by Christopher Coppock, essay by John Reader and an interview with the artist by Russell Roberts. Edition of 1000 copies.
- Volunteer. Artist Photo Books, 2013. ISBN 978-0992748517.
- Things Left Unsaid. Artist Photo Books, 2014. ISBN 978-0992748548.
- Beasts of Burden. Cologne: Strzelecki, 2021. ISBN 978-3-946770-78-7. Edited by Thomas Niemeyer. 72 pages, 32 coloured illustrations.

=== Publications with contributions by Seawright ===
- Documentary Dilemmas. The British Council, London, 1993.
- The Gap Show - Critical Art from Great Britain. Dortmund, Germany: Museum Ostwall.
- Irish Art Now, From the Poetic to the Political. Merrell Holberton Publishers, 1999.
- Tokyo Photo Bienniale Catalogue. Tokyo Metropolitan Museum of Photography, 1999.
- British Art Show 5. Catalogu. National Touring Exhibitions (Hayward Gallery), 2000. ISBN 978-1853322044.
- Further: Artists from Wales at the Venice Bienniale.. Merrell, 2003.
- Re-Imagining Ireland: Irish Art Today. University of Virginia Art Museum, J Hartz.
- So Now Then. Cardiff: Ffotogalery/HPF, 2006. Edited by Seawright and C. Coppock.

== TV and radio ==
- Afghanistan:Ashes to dust, BBC Radio Wales, BBC World Service 30 min documentary, 2002 – "Seawright reports from Afghanistan on the impact of more than twenty years of conflict on the country and its people"
- Profiles: Paul Seawright by Fintan O'Toole, BBC4, 30 minute documentary, 2003

== See also ==
- List of artists from Northern Ireland
