= John Davies (photographer) =

British landscape photographer

John Davies (born 1949) is a British landscape photographer. He is known for completing long-term projects documenting Great Britain and exploring the industrialisation of space. In 2008, he was nominated for the Deutsche Börse Photography Prize.

== Life and work ==
Davies was born in Sedgefield, County Durham, England in 1949. He grew up in coal mining and farming communities, and this combination of open space and industry was to become a persistent motif in his creative work. His early life was spent living in industrial landscapes in County Durham and Nottinghamshire.

He studied photography, first attending Mansfield School of Art to complete a foundation course, then studying at Trent Polytechnic (now Nottingham Trent University), graduating in 1974. Following this, he began working on long-term projects, seeking commissions and arts funding to support his work. He has worked closely with Amber/Side Collective on a number of commissions.

In 1981, Davies won a one-year photography fellowship at Sheffield Polytechnic, and he became senior research fellow at the Art School of University of Wales Cardiff (UWIC) in 1995.

He is known for producing large photographic prints of images produced from high vantage points, using traditional darkroom techniques. His work in the 1980s primarily used medium format cameras, and work from the 1990s a large format camera, although in recent years he has begun using dSLR and digital medium format cameras in his work as well. While his career began by producing traditional, but masterful, landscape images he quickly progressed to composition where the natural environment was juxtaposed against industrial elements impinging on it. This theme of industrialisation has become more prominent with The British Landscape his best-known body of work, and recent work in Mount Fuji, Japan (Fuji City), a meditation on the balance between nature and industry. He has also become involved in local politics, as his interest in the use of public space has been both personal and professional. The shift in subject matter also developed into a fascination with urban regeneration and work on this includes his Metropoli Project, City State, and Cities on the Edge, the latter of which he curated, in addition to contributing images of his own.

Davies' style was a major influence on the practice of noted art photographer Andreas Gursky.

His book A Green and Pleasant Land was the first photobook published by Dewi Lewis, while Lewis was at Cornerhouse. Lewis would later go on to found Dewi Lewis Publishing.

He was the first photographer to be commissioned to work for the Museum of London in 2002.

In 2008, Davies was nominated for the Deutsche Börse Photography Prize, organised by The Photographers' Gallery.

He lives with his partner and their daughter Alix in Liverpool, England.

== Books ==
=== Books by Davies ===
- Aggie Weston's no.13. Belper, Derbyshire: Stuart Mills, 1977 ASIN B0007C4X2C.
- The Valleys project. Cardiff: Ffotogallery, 1985.
- On the edge of White Peak. Derbyshire Museum Services, UK, 1985.
- In the wake of King Cotton. Rochdale Art Gallery, UK, 1986.
- Mist Mountain Water Wind. London: Traveling Light, 1986. ISBN 0-906333-18-0.
- A Green & Pleasant Land. Manchester: Cornerhouse, 1987. ISBN 0-948797-10-X soft cover ISBN 0-948797-15-0.
- Autoroute A26, Calais – Reims. Douchy, France: Mission Photogaphique Transmanche, 1989. ISBN 2-904538-16-X.
- Phase 11 (eleven). London: The Photographers' Gallery; London: Davenport, 1991. ISBN 0-907879-27-6.
- Broadgate. London: Davenport, 1991.
- Cross Currents. Cardiff: Ffotogallery; Manchester: Cornerhouse, 1992. ISBN 0-948797-32-0.
- Linea di Confine della Provincia di Reggio Emillia Laboratorio di Fotografia 5. Arcadia Edizioni & Assessorato alla Cultra del Comune di Rubiera, Italy, 1992.
- Skylines. Valencia University, Imp. Mari Montanana, Spain, 1993.
- Through fire and water: River Taff. Oriel (The Arts Council of Wales' Gallery, Cardiff); National Museum & Galleries of Wales, 1997. ISBN 0-946329-45-1.
- Sguardigardesani. Milan, Italy: Charta, 1999. ISBN 88-8158-223-6.
- Temps et Paysage. Tarabuste / Centre d'art et du Paysage, 2000. ISBN 2-84587-010-8.
- Visa III, Littoral / Le retour de la nature. Filigranes, 2001. ISBN 2-914381-17-4.
- Seine Valley. Le Point du Jour Editeur / Pole Image Haute-Normandie, France, 2002. ISBN 2-912132-21-5.
- The British Landscape. Chris Boot, 2006. ISBN 0-9546894-7-X.
- Urban Landscapes / Krajobrazy Miejskie. Poznań, Poland: Centrum Kultury 'Zamek', 2008.
- European Eyes on Japan / Japan Today volume 10. EU-Japan fest / European Eyes on Japan, 2008.

=== Books with others ===
- John Davies, Martin Parr. Sguardi Gardesani 2. Milan: Charta, 1999. ISBN 8881582236. Photographs by Davies and Martin Parr, text by Franco Rella. Catalogue of an exhibition held at Museo Civico, Riva del Garda; text in Italian and English.

=== Books edited by Davies ===
- Cities on the Edge. Liverpool: Liverpool University. ISBN 978-1-84631-186-4. Commissioned as part of European Capital of Culture, 2008. Published on the occasion of an exhibition. Photographs by Davies and others.
