= Mark Power =

British photographer (born 1959)

Mark Power (born 1959) is a British photographer. He is a member of Magnum Photos and Professor of Photography in The Faculty of Arts and Architecture at the University of Brighton. Power has been awarded the Terence Donovan Award and an Honorary Fellowship from the Royal Photographic Society.

== Life and work ==
Power was born in Harpenden, England, in 1959. He studied Fine Art at Brighton Polytechnic (1978–1981), and then travelled extensively, discovering a love for photography along the way. Upon his return, he worked as a freelance for several UK publications and charities.

Power happened to be in Berlin on 9 November 1989 and photographed the fall of the Berlin Wall. He later published the photographs in the book Die Mauer ist Weg! (2014).

Between 1992 and 1996, he embarked on The Shipping Forecast — a project that involved travelling to and photographing all 31 areas covered by the Shipping Forecast broadcast on BBC Radio 4. This project was published as a book and was a touring exhibition across the UK and France. He used a Volkswagen campervan as his mode of transport for the project, echoing the late Tony Ray-Jones, whose work has similarities in style and meaning to Power's.

Between 1997 and 2000, Power was commissioned to document the Millennium Dome in London, a project that resulted in another touring exhibition and the accompanying book, Superstructure. Around this time his technical methods changed and he began to use colour film and a large format camera. This was followed by The Treasury Project, published in 2002, which recorded the renovation of the UK government's treasury building on Whitehall, London.

In 2003, he undertook another personal project, using the London A–Z map as inspiration. The work, titled 26 Different Endings, is a collection of images examining the areas on the outer boundaries of the map. The project was exhibited at the Centre of Visual Art at the University of Brighton, and was published as a book in 2007.

Between 1988 and 2002 Power was a member of Network Photographers. In 2002 he became a nominee of Magnum Photos, an associate in 2005 and a full member in 2007.

Between 1992 and 2004 he was Senior Lecturer in Photography at the University of Brighton, becoming Professor of Photography in 2004, until the present.

From 2004, he spent five years working on The Sound of Two Songs, on Poland's first five years as a member of the European Union.

Between 2006 and 2010 Power collaborated with poet Daniel Cockrill to document the rise in English nationalism. The pair undertook a series of road trips around England, culminating in the book Destroying the Laboratory for the Sake of the Experiment.

In 2011 he undertook a commission from Multistory to make work that explored the social landscape of the Black Country through photography and film. He made urban landscapes; a series of photographs of elegant footwear; and a series of short films made in beauty salons, tattoo parlours and nightclubs.

In 2014 Power began a self-publishing imprint, Globtik Books, with the publication of his book Die Mauer ist Weg!.

== Technique ==
Power primarily uses a digital medium format view camera, after he worked with large format film for many years. More recently he diversified into short film making.

== Publications ==
=== Publications by Power ===
- Westminster Children's Hospital. Photographers Gallery catalogue, 1988.
- The Shipping Forecast. Zelda Cheatle Press/Network, 1996. ISBN 1-899823-02-6.
- Superstructure. Harper Collins Illustrated, 2000. ISBN 978-0-002-20205-3.
- The Treasury Project. Brighton: Photoworks, 2002. ISBN 978-1-903-79605-4. Edition of 1500 copies, of which only 500 were made available for public sale.
- 26 Different Endings. Brighton: Photoworks, 2007. ISBN 978-1-903-79621-4. Edition of 1000 copies.
- Signes. Gulbenkian Foundation exhibition catalogue, 2008. ISBN 978-9-728-46246-8.
- The Sound of Two Songs. Brighton: Photoworks, 2010. ISBN 978-1-903-79639-9. Edition of 2000 copies.
- MASS. Gost, 2013. ISBN 978-0-957-42721-1. Edition of 750 copies.
- Swap Shop - Postcards from America IV: Florida. London: Magnet Publishing, 2013.
- Die Mauer ist Weg!. Brighton and Hove: self-published / Globtik Books, 2014. ISBN 978-0-9930830-0-6. Edition of 1000 copies.
- Icebreaker. Another Place, 2018. ISBN 978-1-9997424-3-0. Edition of 600 copies.
- Maintenance. Kyoto, Japan: Seigensha, 2018. ISBN 978-4-86152-660-2.
- Good Morning, America (Volume I). London: Gost, 2019. ISBN 978-1-910401-20-0.
- Good Morning, America (Volume II). London: Gost, 2019. ISBN 978-1-910401-32-3.
- Good Morning, America (Volume II). London: Gost, 2020. ISBN 978-1-910401-49-1.
- Terre à l'Amende. London: Gost, 2021. ISBN 978-1-910401-65-1.

=== Collaborative publications ===
- Buren, document Nederland, drie buitenlandse fotografen kijken naar Nederland = Neighbours: The Netherlands as seen by three foreign photographers. Amsterdam: De Verbeelding, 2000. With Eva Leitolf and Stephan Vanfleteren; text by Tracy Metz. ISBN 90-74159-30-3.
- Destroying the Laboratory for the Sake of the Experiment. Brighton and Hove: self-published / Globtik Books, 2016. Photographs by Power, poetry by Daniel Cockrill. ISBN 978-0-9930830-1-3. Edition of 1500 copies.

=== Publications with contributions by Power ===
- Positive Lives: Responses to HIV. London: Network Photographers; Cassell, 1993. ISBN 0-304-32846-4. Part of the Cassell AIDS Awareness Series. Edited by Stephen Mayes and Lyndall Stein. Power contributes photographs for a chapter, "Grief and Loss". With a foreword by Edmund White and an introduction by Stephen Mayes. Each chapter also includes a written essay.
- Home. Tokyo: Magnum Photos Tokyo, 2018. ISBN 978-4-9909806-0-3.

== Awards ==
- 2000: Second prize, Arts and Entertainment stories category, World Press Photo 1999, Amsterdam
- 2003: Terence Donovan Award, Royal Photographic Society, Bath
- 2017: Honorary Fellowship of the Royal Photographic Society, Bath
