= Paul Lowe (photographer) =

British photographer and educator (1963–2024)

- Born: Christian Paul Lowe; 6 November 1963; London, England
- Died: 12 October 2024 (aged 60); San Gabriel Mountains, Los Angeles County, USA
- Occupations: Photojournalist; educator; writer; critic
- Years active: 1980s–2024
- Notable work: Bosnians (2005)
- Awards: Vic Odden Award, Royal Photographic Society

Christopher Paul Lowe (6 November 1963 – 12 October 2024) was a British photojournalist, educator, writer and critic. He was awarded the Royal Photographic Society's Vic Odden Award in 1999.

== Early life and education ==
Lowe was born on 6 November 1963 in London, and grew up in Liverpool. He graduated from the University of Cambridge in 1986 with a BA in history and philosophy. He earned a BTEC in documentary photography from Gwent College of Higher Education; and a PhD in photography from the University of the Arts London.

== Life and work ==
Lowe worked as a photojournalist in more than 80 countries from the 1980s to the 2000s. The first major event he covered was the fall of the Berlin Wall, and went on to cover the Romanian revolution, Nelson Mandela's release from prison, the Yugoslav Wars, the destruction of Grozny, and famine in Africa.

Lowe was a member of the VII Photo Agency; he had also been a member of Magnum Photos in 1998 but withdrew at some later point.

He was Course Director of the MA in Photojournalism and Documentary Photography at London College of Communication; a visiting professor in war studies at King's College London; and taught at an academy through the VII Foundation. "His books and lectures, many of which dealt with the history of photojournalism and the ethics of representing human suffering through images, often spoke of photography's potential to help bear witness to atrocities."

== Personal life ==
Lowe met Amra Abadzic in Sarajevo while she was working as a journalist for Reuters. The couple married in 1995 and spent much of their life in Sarajevo, her hometown. The couple had two sons. He divided his time between London and Sarajevo.

=== Death ===
Lowe died after being stabbed on a hiking trail in the San Gabriel Mountains, northern Los Angeles County, United States, on 12 October 2024. He was 60. His 19-year-old son, Emir, was charged with his murder. Lowe had travelled to Los Angeles to try to help his son, who has a history of mental illness and had not returned in two months from a trip to the US that was supposed to last days. The Los Angeles County Sheriff's Department apprehended his son soon after he crashed the car he and Lowe had been using while touring the San Gabriel mountains.

== Publications ==
- Bosnians. Saqi and the Bosnian Institute, London, 2005. With an essay by Allan Little. ISBN 978-0863565069.
- Behind the Camera: Creative Techniques of 100 Great Photographers. Prestel, 2016. ISBN 978-3-7913-8279-1.
- Photography Masterclass: Creative Techniques of 100 Great Photographers. London: Thames & Hudson, 2016. ISBN 9780500544624.
- 1001 Photographs You Must See in Your Lifetime. Universe, 2017. ISBN 9780789327680.
- A Chronology of Photography: A Cultural Timeline from Camera Obscura to Instagram. London: Thames & Hudson, 2018. ISBN 9780500545034.
- Understanding Photojournalism. With Jennifer Good. Routledge, 2020. ISBN 978-1472594907.
- Photography Rules: Essential Dos and Don'ts from Great Photographers. Frances Lincoln, 2020. ISBN 978-0711242586.
- Reporting the Siege of Sarajevo. With Kenneth Morrison. Bloomsbury Academic, 2021. ISBN 978-1350081741.
- Ernst Haas: The American West. Prestel, 2022. ISBN 978-3791388250.
- Photography, Bearing Witness and the Yugoslav Wars, 1988–2021: Testimonies of Light. Routledge, 2022. ISBN 978-1474243759.

== Awards ==
- 1999: Vic Odden Award, Royal Photographic Society, Bath, UK
