= Gideon Mendel =

South African photographer (born 1959)

- Born: 31 August 1959 (age 66); Johannesburg, South Africa
- Education: University of Cape Town
- Occupation: Photographer
- Years active: 1980–present

Gideon Mendel (born 31 August 1959) is a South African photographer, based in London. His work engages with contemporary social issues of global concern. It was his work as a 'struggle photographer' during the final years of apartheid in the 1980s that first brought attention to his work.

== Life and work ==
Born in Johannesburg in 1959, Mendel studied psychology and African history at the University of Cape Town. He began photographing in the 1980s during the final years of apartheid and produced a number of bodies of work documenting the resultant societal conditions and political climate in South Africa.

In the early 1990s he moved to London, from where he has continued to respond to social issues experienced globally. He travels extensively in order to do so, which is reflected by his images focusing on people and societies from countries all over the world. Most of his projects are developed over long periods of time. Video has increasingly become a part if his practice, and he also employs collaborative photography as a means of interacting with his subjects.

Mendel has worked for National Geographic, Fortune, Geo, The Independent magazine, The Guardian Weekend magazine, The Sunday Times magazine, Condé Nast Traveler, L'Express, Stern and Rolling Stone.

His first book, A Broken Landscape: HIV & AIDS in Africa, was published in 2001. Since then he has produced a number of photographic advocacy projects, working with charities and campaigning organizations including The Global Fund, Médecins Sans Frontières, Treatment Action Campaign, the International HIV/AIDS Alliance, ActionAid, the Terrence Higgins Trust, Shelter, Leonard Cheshire Disability, UNICEF and Concern Worldwide.

=== Drowning World ===
Since 2007, Mendel has been working on Drowning World, an art and advocacy project about flooding. Shortlisted for the Prix Pictet prize, it is his personal response to climate change.

Mendel started the project after travelling to the UK, and then India to document the damage caused by floods a few weeks apart from each other. He was struck by the "contrasting effects of the flooding, and the shared vulnerability of their victims". He describes the project as "my attempt to explore the effects of climate change in an intimate way, taking us beyond faceless statistics and into the individual experiences of its victims." Since beginning the project, he has documented flood damage and the impact of people living in areas affected by floods in countries including Haiti, Pakistan, Australia, Thailand, Nigeria, Germany and the Philippines.

Central to the narrative of the work are the submerged portraits. The subjects' flooded homes are often used as locations, creating a disconcertingly altered environment. The full body of work consists of these portraits, as well as two further series. Flood Lines documents the impact of floodwaters of interior spaces, and Water Marks records the changes left by flood waters left on personal photographs of the victims, which Mendel photographs and collects.

The work combines photography with video pieces. Using footage from his trips, Mendel has collaborated with video makers in order to compose a series of short films. The videos accompany the photographs in the series.

=== HIV ===
One of the major focuses of his work is the issue of HIV/AIDS. Mendel began documenting HIV/AIDS in sub-Saharan Africa in the early 1990s. While awareness about the disease was growing rapidly at the time, antiretroviral treatment (ART) was still very difficult to access for many of the continent's poorest. As a result, the disease was having a very destructive impact on communities across the sub-continent. After covering AIDS in these areas, Mendel started to develop what has been a lifelong focus in his work.

In 1993 Mendel's photographs documented the lives of four patients with HIV at the Middlesex Hospital in London. He aimed to show them as people with lives and relationships. As well as a book (The Ward, 2017) there was an exhibition of some of the photographs in the Fitzrovia Chapel within the hospital. During this project he met a nurse, Sarah, who became his own long-term partner.

The ongoing chapter of his work on AIDS, Through Positive Eyes, is a collaborative project with the UCLA Art and Global Health Center. The project works with subjects located in seven cities around the globe, all of whom are HIV positive. The organisation describes the project as telling the "story of HIV/AIDS in the fourth decade of the epidemic" when access to treatment is "far from universal". Developed by Davide Gere at the UCLA, the workshops that form part of the project are led by fellow photographer Crispin Hughes. In this body of work, Mendel's role has shifted from photographer to enabler, handing the camera over to HIV-positive people, with whom he works in order to document their stories.

=== Apartheid ===
Mendel belonged to part of a generation of "struggle photographers", committed to documenting the conflict and political upheavals of the 1980s in South Africa. Employed as a news photographer, it was through covering these circumstances that he began his career.

Mendel has produced a number of bodies of work, through which he attempts to make sense of apartheid, and its continuous effect on South Africa and its people, most notably Living in Yeoville, a film that was commissioned by Okwui Enwezor for the Rise and Fall of Apartheid exhibition.

== Awards ==
- 1996: Eugene Smith Award for Humanistic Photography, W. Eugene Smith Memorial Fund
- Six World Press Photo Awards
- First prize, Pictures of the Year International competition
- POY Canon Photo Essayist Award
- 2003: Amnesty International Media Award for Photojournalism
- 2015: Shortlisted for the Prix Pictet (Disorder) for Drowning World
- 2017: Finalist, Leica Oskar Barnack Award, for Drowning World
- 2021: First prize (Portrait), Head On Photo Awards
