= Steve Pyke =

British photographer

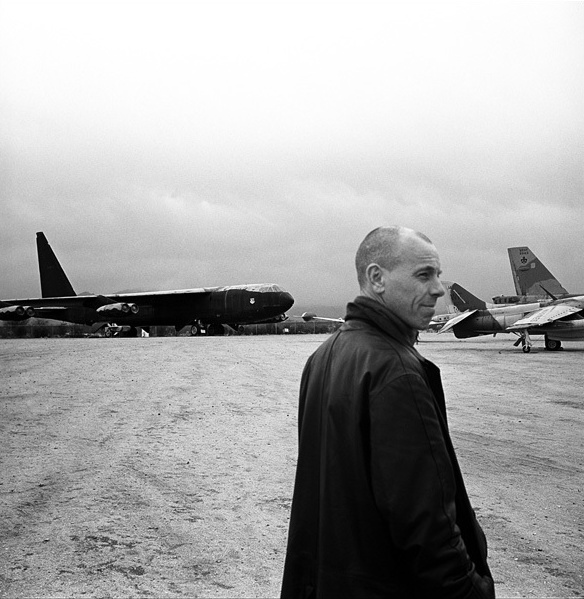
- Pyke in Cali, by Jonathan Worth
- Born: 1957 (age 68–69); Leicester, England
- Known for: Photography
- Spouse: Nicole Marie Kaczorowski (m. 2014)
- Awards: MBE

Steve Pyke MBE (born 1957) is a British photographer living in New Orleans, Louisiana. From 1981 to 1984, he worked for diverse publications including The Face and NME. Pyke was a staff photographer at The New Yorker from 2004 through 2010.

== Life and career ==
Born in Leicester, Pyke left school at 16 to work in the local textile industry as a factory mechanic. He became involved in the turbulent music scene of the late 1970s, a move which led him into his first experiments in photography. Pyke moved to London in 1978. He became a singer in a number of bands and was involved with establishing a record label and fanzines. During an extended motorcycle tour of the US in 1976, he assembled a collection of Instamatic pictures. On his return he Xeroxed and coloured them and, fascinated by the results, purchased a Rolleiflex camera. By 1980 he had abandoned rock music for the visual arts.

Pyke's early work was sold to magazines and the music press, and exhibited from 1982. He contributed The Face. His first cover subject was John Lydon. He sought to develop his style by joining the Film Centre Stream course at the London College of Printing in 1982, though he worked as much on his own projects as college assignments. Pyke created photographic works for Peter Greenaway's films that were used in stills and poster shots for A Zed and Two Noughts, The Belly of an Architect, Drowning by Numbers and The Cook, the Thief, His Wife & Her Lover. More recently his work featured prominently in Mike Nichols' movie Closer.

It was during an early project on film directors that Pyke established his trademark portrait style, chancing on the little close-up lenses, that when placed on his Rolleiflex camera, allowed him to make incisive, direct images within the square 6x6cm negative. The first picture made in this way, of the film director Sam Fuller in 1983, was taken the same afternoon as Pyke found the Rolleinars in an Edinburgh camera shop.

Pyke has developed, self-funded and then published a number of personal projects, including those on the world's leading thinkers (in "Philosophers") and on youth identity (in "Uniforms" and "Homeless"). In the late nineties he completed the series, Astronauts, photographing the men that had walked on the Moon as well as related still life artefacts from the Apollo missions. Pyke has been collecting the Faces of Our Times for roughly thirty years, recording those who have made a contribution to the history of the age. He has made a series on First World War veterans and The Holocaust Survivors as well as a study of the world's leading film directors. He has produced still-life projects that include his "Soles" series and the "Post Partum Post Mortem" collection. There is also landscape work, experiments in collage and multiple imagery, and a body of humanist street photography.

Pyke has worked for many magazines, and published eight books which concentrate on different aspects of his work. His work has been exhibited widely in the UK, Europe, Japan, Mexico and the US and is held in many permanent collections, including the National Portrait Gallery, the Imperial War Museum, the V&A in London, and the New York Public Library.

Pyke was appointed an MBE in the 2004 New Year Honours list for his services to the Arts. In 2006 he was made an Honorary Fellow of the Royal Photographic Society. He became staff photographer at The New Yorker in 2004 and lives in New Orleans.

Pyke married photographer Nic Kaczorowski at St. Paul's Cathedral, London, in June 2014. They live and work in New Orleans, Louisiana.

== Publications ==
- Poguetry: The Lyrics of Shane MacGowan (Faber & Faber, 1990), ISBN 0-571-14198-2
- Philosophers (Cornerhouse, 1993), ISBN 0-948797-76-2
- Life in Art: Photographs by Steve Pyke (Saga Charitable Trust, 2000), ISBN 0-9539699-0-8
- Post Partum (Nazraeli, One Picture Book #32, 2005), ISBN 978-1-59005-149-8
- Post Mortem (Nazraeli, One Picture Book #33, 2005), ISBN 978-1-59005-150-4
- Conversations on Ethics (Oxford University Press, 2009), ISBN 978-0-19-921537-9
- Earthward (Nazraeli, 2009), ISBN 978-1-59005-253-2
- Philosophers (Oxford University Press, 2011), ISBN 978-0199757145
- Children of Las Vegas: True Stories of Growing up in the World's Playground (Unbound, 2016), ISBN 978-1-78352-250-7
- I Could Read the Sky (reissued Unbound, 2023; original Harvill, 1997), ISBN 978-1-80018-271-4
- Scribendi: Irish Writers 1982–2025 (Lilliput, 2025)
