= Robert Darch =

British artist-photographer

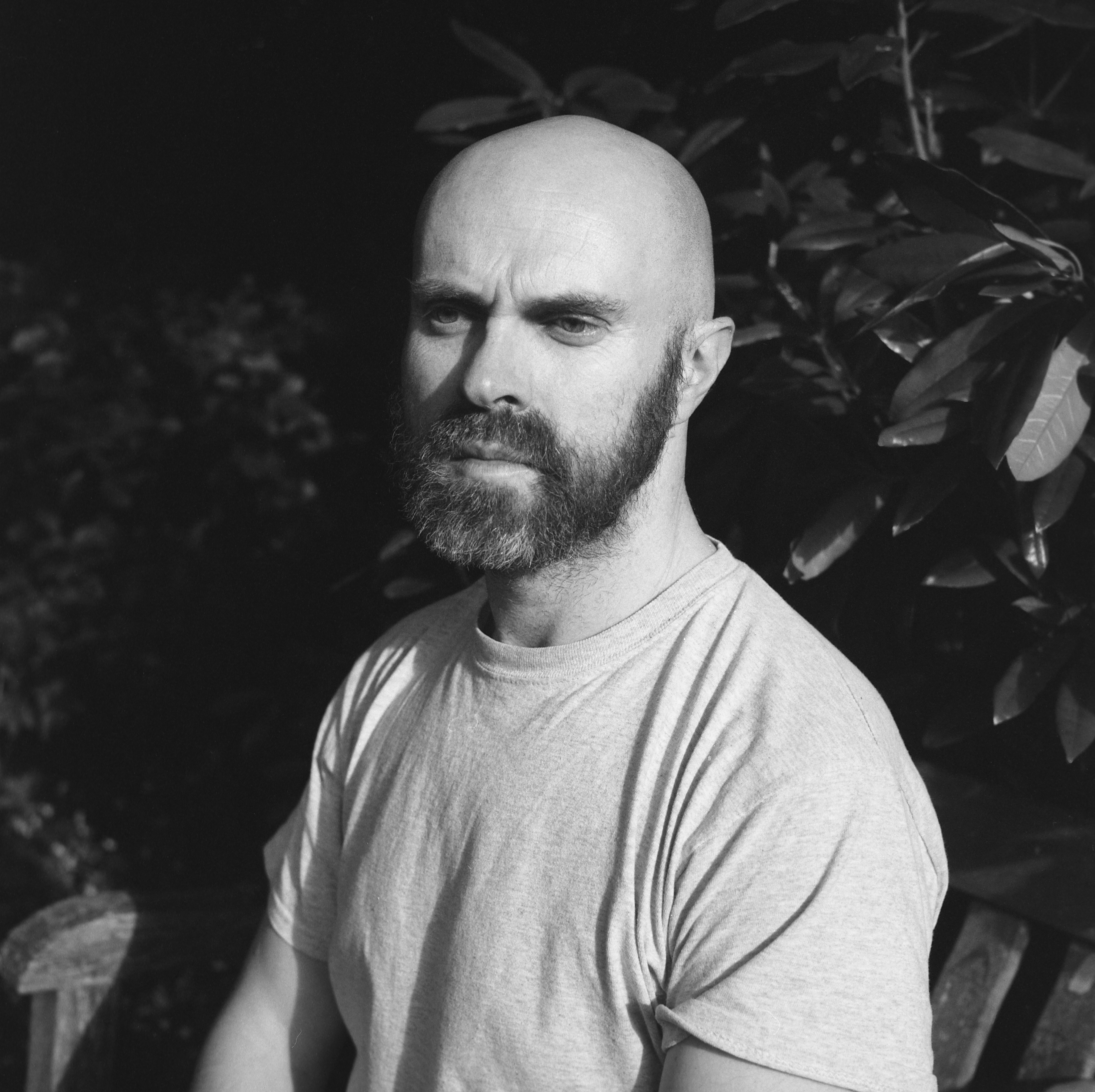
- Robert Darch
- Born: 1979 (age 46–47); Birmingham, England
- Known for: Photography

Robert Darch (born 1979) is a British artist-photographer. His first book, The Moor, was published in 2018.

== Life and work ==
Darch was born in Birmingham and grew up in Droitwich Spa. He studied Documentary Photography at University of Wales, Newport, graduating in 2004. He returned to study photography at Plymouth University in 2013 after a long period of illness, gaining a Masters in Photography & The Book and an MFA in Photographic Arts.

Darch's work was included in the book Another Country: British Documentary Photography Since 1945, by Gerry Badger and published by Thames & Hudson.

Darch resides in Devon, England, where he located the fictional town of Durlescombe, the setting for an on-going series exploring his familial attachment to this specific region of England.

The Moor (2018) depicts a fictionalised dystopian future situated on the bleak moorland landscapes of Dartmoor, Devon.

Vale (2020) reflects on a long period of ill health Darch suffered in his twenties and the isolation and loneliness he experienced because of that. Whilst he was ill he would get lost in daydream and fiction, creating imaginary worlds to temper the isolation and sadness. Vale reflects on this lost time and imagines a fictional summer spent swimming in rivers and exploring woods, underscored by a sustained sense of eeriness.

== Publications ==
=== Publications by Darch ===
- The Moor. Another Place, 2018. ISBN 9781999607746. Edition of 500 copies.
- Vale. LIDO, 2020. ISBN 9781838219505. Edition of 750 copies.

=== Publications with contributions by Darch ===
- Portrait of Britain Vol 1. London: Hoxton Mini Press, 2018. ISBN 9781910566381.
- Portrait of Britain Vol 2. London: Hoxton Mini Press, 2019. ISBN 9781910566541.
- Portrait of Britain Vol 3. London: Hoxton Mini Press, 2020. ISBN 9781910566770.
- Facing Britain. Germany: Walther & Franz König, 2021. ISBN 9783753300627.
- Portrait of Britain Vol 4. London: Hoxton Mini Press, 2021. ISBN 9781914314131.
- Another Country: British Documentary Photography Since 1945. London: Thames & Hudson, 2022. ISBN 0500022178.

== Awards ==
- 2016: Portrait Salon, for "Boys on the Estuary"
- 2017: Winner, single image in Life category, Renaissance Photography Prize
- 2018: Portrait of Britain, British Journal of Photography
- 2019: Portrait of Britain, British Journal of Photography
- 2021: Portrait of Britain, British Journal of Photography

== Selected solo exhibitions ==
- Durlescombe, Kunsthalle Darmstadt, Darmstadt, Germany, April 2022.

== Selected group exhibitions ==
- Distinctly, Pingyao International Photography Festival, Pingyao, China, September 2018. Work by Darch and Martin Parr, Chris Killip, Daniel Meadows, John Myers, Markéta Luskačová, Tish Murtha, Ken Grant, Paul Seawright, Niall McDiarmid, Elaine Constantine, and Kirsty Mackay.
- Distinctly, Look Photo Biennal, Liverpool, U.K., September 2019. Work by Darch and Martin Parr, Chris Killip, Daniel Meadows, John Myers, Markéta Luskačová, Tish Murtha, Ken Grant, Niall McDiarmid and Kirsty Mackay.
- Facing Britain, Museum Goch, Germany, October 2020. Work by Darch and John Bulmer, Rob Bremner, Thom Corbishley, Anna Fox, Ken Grant, Judy Greenway, Mohamed Hassan, Paul Hill, David Hurn, Barry Lewis, Markéta Luskačová, Kirsty Mackay, Niall McDiarmid, Daniel Meadows, Peter Mitchell, Tish Murtha, John Myers, Jon Nicholson, Kevin O'Farrell, Niall McDiarmid, Martin Parr, Mark Pinder, Paul Reas, Simon Roberts, Syd Shelton, Dave Sinclair, Homer Sykes and Jon Tonks.
- Turn to Return, Bristol Photo Festival, Bristol, U.K. September 2021. Work by Darch and Helen Sear.
- Facing Britain, Kunsthalle Darmstadt, Darmstadt, Germany, September 2021.
- Facing Britain, Mönchehaus Museum Goslar, Goslar, Germany, February 2022.
- Facing Britain, Museum for Photography Krakow, Krakow, Poland, June 2022.
