= Peter Mitchell (photographer) =

British documentary photographer

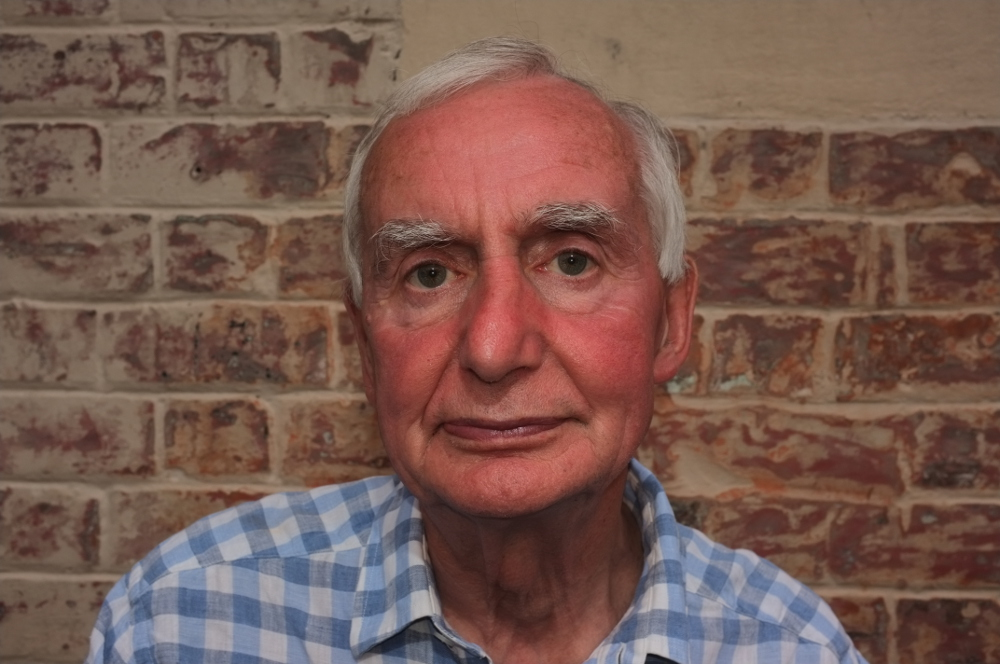

Peter Mitchell (born 1943) is a British documentary photographer, known for documenting Leeds and the surrounding area for more than 40 years. Mitchell's photographs have been published in three monographs of his own. His work was exhibited at Impressions Gallery in 1979, and nearly thirty years later was included in major survey exhibitions throughout the UK including at Tate Britain and Media Space in London, and the National Science and Media Museum in Bradford. Mitchell's work is held in the permanent collections of the Royal Photographic Society and Leeds Art Gallery.

== Life and work ==
Mitchell was born in Manchester in 1943.

In 1979 Impressions Gallery showed his work A New Refutation of the Viking 4 Space Mission, the pictures showed the traditional urban landscape presented on a background of space charts, the concept being that an alien has landed from Mars and is wandering around Leeds with a degree of surprise and puzzle. Martin Parr described this show as groundbreaking.

His images of Quarry Hill flats were published as Memento Mori in 1990. Mitchell arrived in Leeds in time to record the passing of the great estate.

In 2007 Mitchell's work was included in How We Are: Photographing Britain a photography exhibition held at Tate Britain.

The main body of his work documents factories and small shop owners. These photographs were shot throughout the 1970s whilst Mitchell was working as a truck driver in Leeds. He photographed the city whilst commuting "in a very formal manner with the aid of a stepladder." After self-publishing Memento Mori in 1990, his movements within the photography sphere were minimal. After many years of persuasion from Parr, Mitchell later agreed to publishing the monograph Strangely Familiar, published by Nazreali Press in 2013. Colin Pantall described this work as "a classic". He told the BBC that it is a "gritty kind of sentimentality".

His follow-up, SomeThing Means Everything to Somebody (2015), shows inanimate objects looked over by scarecrows. Mitchell, a child of the Airfix generation, recorded this collection of scarecrows over 40 years and presents this array of objects and scarecrows as an autobiography. When talking about the book, Peter said "Scarecrows have always been a feature of my childhood...I've purposefully chosen ones that have no face on them because I didn't want people to laugh at them but imagine them as people... I've paired them with the objects that I've got which are my own scruffy little objects - treasured objects I've had since I was little. I chose them because I use them everyday. Everyday objects with the figure of Everyman." Reviewer Karen Jenkins called it a "story of steadfastness and continuity".

In 2020, RRB Photobooks published Early Sunday Morning, edited and sequenced by John Myers, which shows a different Leeds to Mitchell's earlier publications. The book is described as "neither the sombre look at destruction seen in Memento Mori, nor the detached view of 'the man from mars' of A New Refutation of the Viking 4 Space Mission, but a more intimate document of Mitchell's own Leeds." The book's title is itself a reference to American artist Edward Hopper's 1930 painting by Early Sunday Morning. When discussing the book, writer Geoff Dyer said “It is as if Peter Mitchell has taken the atmosphere and mood of Edward Hopper's famous painting and established it as a matter of documentary fact in the north of England at a moment when collapse can lead to further desolation or possible renewal. So these beautiful pictures are drily drenched in history – social, economic and photographic."

== Publications ==
- Memento Mori. Skipton, Dalesman, 1990. ISBN 9781870071482.
  - Bristol: RRB, 2016. facsimile edition.
- Strangely Familiar. Portland, OR: Nazraeli, 2013.
- Some Thing means Everything to Somebody. Bristol: RRB, 2015.
- Scarecrows. Bristol: RRB, 2015. "A collection of 12 of the Scarecrows from Some Thing means Everything to Somebody, plus a few new suspects, in a perforated postcard book."
- A New Refutation of the Viking 4 Space Mission. Bristol: RRB, 2017. ISBN 978-0993232367. Bilingual English and French language edition. With an essay by Val Williams.
- Early Sunday Morning. Bristol: RRB, 2020. Edited and sequenced by John Myers
- Epilogue. Bristol: RRB, 2022.
- On Strange and Familiar Ground. Bristol: RRB Photobooks & AB Editions, 2026

== Exhibitions ==
- Summer Show 4, Serpentine Gallery, London, 1977, selected by Dr. Aaron Scharf, with artists Jane England, Heather Forbes, John Goto, Jim Harold, Paul Joyce, Chris Locke, et al.
- A New Refutation of the Viking 4 Space Mission, Impressions Gallery, York, 1979. The exhibition considered what Leeds would look like to aliens arriving from Mars.
- How We Are: Photographing Britain, Tate Britain, London, 2007. With Mitchell, Keith Arnatt, Nicholas Battye, Jane Bown, Vanley Burke, Stephen Dalton, John Davies, Anna Fox, Paul Graham, Nancy Hellebrand, Chris Killip, Daniel Meadows, Horace Ové, Martin Parr, Martin Pover, Paul Reas, Derek Ridgers, Paul Seawright, Chris Steele-Perkins, Homer Sykes, Paul Trevor, and Tom Wood.
- Project Space Leeds (PSL), Leeds, 2008. With Mitchell and Eric Jacquier. The exhibition showed how Leeds has changed since the 1960s.
- Drawn By Light: The Royal Photographic Society Collection, National Science and Media Museum, Bradford; Media Space, Science Museum, London. Photographs by Mitchell, Roger Fenton, William Henry Fox Talbot, Julia Margaret Cameron, Don McCullin, Terry O'Neill, Martin Parr and others.
- No Such Thing As Society: Photography in Britain 1967-1987, toured 2008–2010. Works from the collections of the British Council and Arts Council England, Hayward Gallery, London; Aberystwyth Arts Centre, Aberystwyth; Tullie House, Carlisle; Leeds Art Gallery, Leeds; National Museum, Cardiff; Laing Art Gallery, Newcastle upon Tyne; The Exchange, Penzance; Centre for Contemporary Art, Warsaw, Poland; and Arbetets Museum, Norrkoping, Sweden.
- Artist And Camera, Leeds Art Gallery, Leeds, 2008. With Mitchell, Gilbert & George, Cornelia Parker, and others
- Planet Yorkshire, Impressions Gallery, Bradford, 2016.
- A New Refutation of the Viking 4 Space Mission (Reprise), Rencontres d'Arles, Arles, France, 2016.
- A New Refutation of the Viking 4 Space Mission (Reprise), Wirtz Art, Oakland, United Startes, 2016
- Nouveau Démenti de la mission spatiale Viking 4, Galerie Clémentine de la Féronnière, Paris, France, 2017
- A New Refutation of the Viking 4 Space Mission, Wirtz Art, Oakland, United States, 2018
- Facing Britain, Museum Goch, Germany 2020 with Meredith Andrews, James Barnor, John Bulmer, Rob Bremner, Thom Corbishley, Robert Darch, Anna Fox, Henry Grant, Ken Grant, Judy Greenway, Mohamed Hassan, Paul Hill, David Hurn, Tony-Ray Jones, Neil Kenlock, Kalepsch Lathigra, Markéta Luskačová, Kirsty Mackay, Fran May, Niall McDiarmid, Daniel Meadows, Sandra Mickiewicz, Peter Mitchell, David Moore, Tish Murtha, John Myers, Mark Neville, Jon Nicholson, Kevin O'Farrell, Martin Parr, Mark Pinder, Yan Wang Preston, Kavi Pujara, Paul Reas, Simon Roberts, Michelle Sank, Syd Shelton, Hazel Simcox, Dave Sinclair, Chris Steele-Perkins, Homer Sykes, Alys Tomlinson, Jon Tonks, Dan Wood and Tom Wood
- A New Refutation of the Viking 4 Space Mission, Musée de la Photographie de Charleroi, Belgium 2020

== Collections ==
Mitchell's work is held in the following public collections:

- Royal Photographic Society, Bath
- Leeds Art Gallery, Leeds
- Tate Modern, London
