= Chris Floyd (photographer) =

British photographer based in London

- Born: 1968 (age 57–58); Welwyn Garden City, Hertfordshire, England
- Occupation: Photographer

Chris Floyd (born 1968) is a British photographer based in London. He is known chiefly for his celebrity portraiture and reportage, beginning with the Britpop music scene in the 1990s. He also works with fashion and advertising photography and film. In 2011, he exhibited his series of 140 portraits of Twitter users.

== Life and work ==
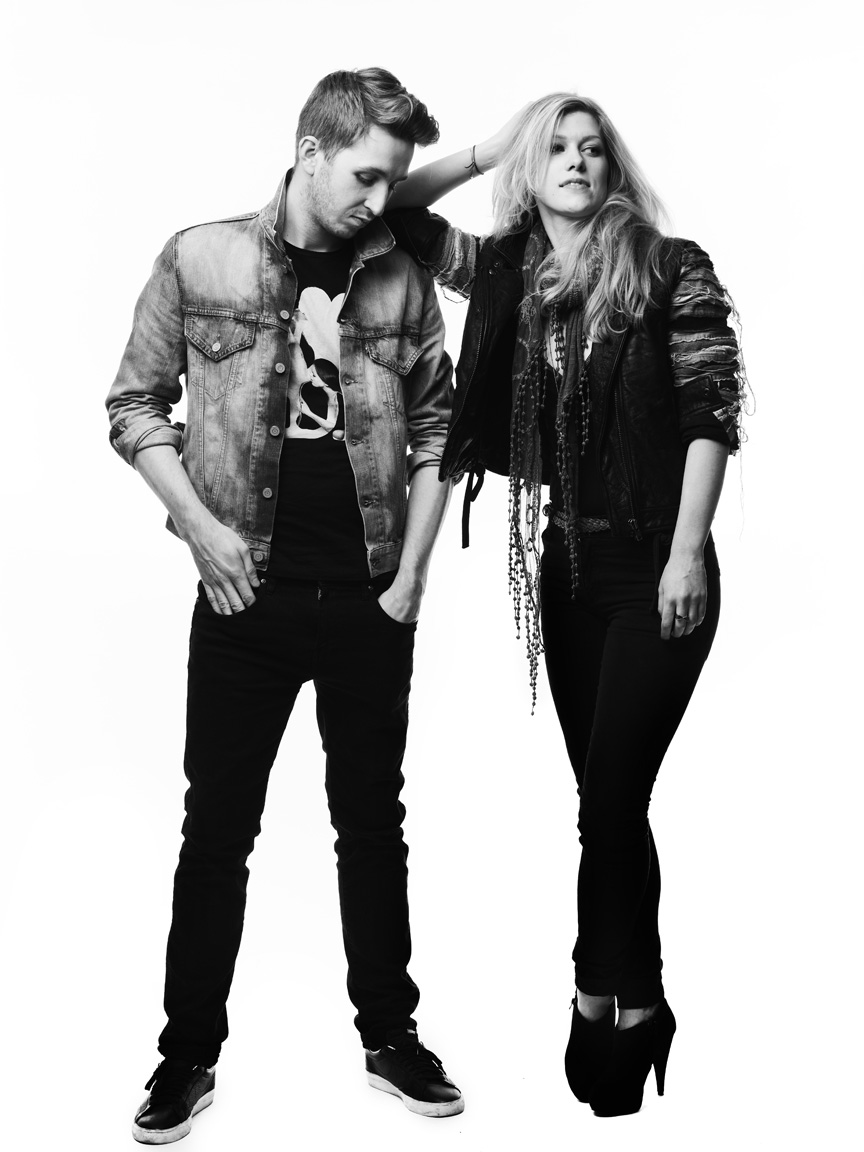
A portrait by Floyd of the band Bim in 2010.

Floyd was born in Welwyn Garden City, Hertfordshire. He started taking photographs when he was 14 and in 1988 completed a BTec Photography course. He moved to London in 1990 and pursued a career in photography. As a young photographer, he took photographs of The Orb, which appeared in the music magazine Select. In 1994, Floyd started working for Loaded as well as The Face and Dazed & Confused magazines. His photography in this period is strongly associated with the era of Britpop.

His work has been published in The Sunday Times Magazine, The New York Times Magazine, American and British Esquire, Vogue, Vanity Fair, The New Yorker, Harpers Bazaar, GQ, Wallpaper* and Guardian Weekend.

He was selected for the National Portrait Gallery, London's Taylor Wessing Photographic Portrait Prize in 2008 and 2013.

In 2011, he exhibited his series of 140 portraits of Twitter users, One Hundred and Forty Characters.

== Publications ==
=== Publications by Floyd ===
- The Verve: Photographs By Chris Floyd. London: Reel Art, 2017. Edited by Dave Brolan. ISBN 978-1-909526-53-2.

=== Publications with contributions by Floyd ===
- Professional Photography: The New Global Landscape Explained. Oxford: Focal, 2014. By Grant Scott. ISBN 978-0415717540. With contributions from Floyd, Alicia Bruce, Peter Dench, Niall McDiarmid and Jim Mortram.
- Great Britons of Photography Vol.1: The Dench Dozen. Eastbourne, UK: Hungry Eye, 2016. ISBN 978-0-9926405-2-1. Edited by Peter Dench. With photographs by and transcripts of interviews between Dench and Floyd, Jocelyn Bain Hogg, Marcus Bleasdale, Harry Borden, John Bulmer, Brian Griffin, Laura Pannack, Martin Parr, Tom Stoddart, Homer Sykes, and Anastasia Taylor-Lind. 160 pages. Edition of 500 copies.

== Collections ==
- National Portrait Gallery, London: 14 prints (as of January 2019)
