= Tish Murtha =

British photographer

- Born: Patricia Anne Murtha; 14 March 1956; South Shields, England
- Died: 13 March 2013 (aged 56); Middlesbrough, England
- Education: The University of Wales, Newport
- Known for: Photography
- Style: Social documentary photography
- Website: tishmurtha.co.uk

Patricia Anne Murtha (14 March 1956 – 13 March 2013) was a British social documentary photographer best known for documenting marginalised communities, social realism and working class life in Newcastle upon Tyne and the North East of England.

The posthumously published books of her work are Youth Unemployment (2017), Elswick Kids (2018) and Juvenile Jazz Bands (2020).

== Early life and education ==
Murtha was born on 14 March 1956 in South Shields, North East England. She was the third of ten children of Irish descent, brought up in a council house in Elswick in Newcastle.

In 1976, aged 20, she left home to study at the School of Documentary Photography at The University of Wales, Newport, set up by Magnum Photos member David Hurn.

== Life and work ==
After graduating in 1978, she returned to Newcastle and set out to document "marginalized communities from the inside". Unlike other photographers who came to document poverty in the region, Murtha lived it. She captured the lives of her friends, family and the community around her while she was on a job scheme for the unemployed.

This led to the then controversial exhibitions Juvenile Jazz Bands (1979) and Youth Unemployment (1981), which was raised as a subject of debate in the House of Commons. Around this time Murtha was also commissioned to document the campaign Save Scotswood Works (1979) and provided photographs for the THAC (Tyneside Housing Aid Centre) publications Do you know what this is doing to my little girl? - Home Truths in the Year Of The Child (1979) and Burying The Problem (1980), highlighting social poverty on Tyneside.

In 1982, Murtha moved to London, where she worked on London By Night (1983) along with Bill Brandt, Brian Griffin and Peter Marlow. The group exhibition documenting Soho and the commercial sex industry, was exhibited in The Photographers' Gallery, London. Murtha lived in the capital for five years, working on commission for Edward Arnold Publishers. She also photographed emerging celebrities Julian Clary and Philip Herbert and took the first headshots of a young Declan Donnelly upon her return to the north east in 1987.

Between 2008 and 2012, Murtha's work was selected for three Arts Council / British Council Collection exhibitions; No Such Thing as Society: Photography in Britain 1967–1987: From the Arts Council Collection and the British Council Collection showcased "a radically new picture of these two turbulent decades"; Unpopular Culture – Grayson Perry Selects from the Arts Council Collection examined 70 works by 50 artists Perry describes as belonging to a period "before British art became fashionable"; Observadores - Fotógrafos Da Cena Britânica Desde 1930 Até Hoje (Observers: British Photography and the British Scene) was "the first exhibition ever staged in Brazil to chart a course through British photography in modern times." In 2011, the group exhibition Paul Graham, Tish Murtha and Markéta Luskačová formed part of Look 11: Liverpool International Photography Festival.

On 13 March 2013—the day before what would have been her 57th birthday—Murtha died after suffering a sudden brain aneurysm.

== Personal life ==
Murtha was a vegetarian and held left-wing political views, which informed her lifelong focus on working-class communities in north-east England. She had a daughter, Ella, whom she named after jazz singer Ella Fitzgerald. Murtha raised Ella as a single mother.

== Legacy ==
Posthumously, Murtha's work was included in the group exhibitions True/Grit - A Celebration of Northern Realism (2013), For Ever Amber (2015). and Childhoods - 1977 to 2016 (2016).

Paul Reas and Lulu Preece at University of South Wales began scanning the Tish Murtha archive, which contains thousands of previously unseen images. Ella Murtha became the custodian and promoter of her mother's archive and legacy. Ella published the book Youth Unemployment through Bluecoat Press in November 2017 after a successful Kickstarter campaign.

Ella was also involved in the 2023 documentary film Tish. Tish, directed by Paul Sng, opened Sheffield DocFest on 14 June 2023.

A number of Murtha's images were used as the artwork for Sam Fender's album People Watching.

== Publications ==
=== Books collecting Murtha's Work ===
- Youth Unemployment. Liverpool: Bluecoat, 2017. ISBN 978-1908457394. Hardback first edition.
  - Liverpool: Bluecoat, 2018. ISBN 978-1908457424. Paperback second edition.
- Elswick Kids. Liverpool: Bluecoat, 2018. ISBN 978-1908457509. Hardback.
- Juvenile Jazz Bands. Liverpool: Bluecoat, 2020. ISBN 978-1908457561. Hardback.

=== Zines by Murtha ===
- Newport Tip 1978. Southport: Café Royal, 2018. Edition of 500 copies. (Note: Café Royal's page about Newport Tip 1978 is here.)
- Newport Doc Photo Class of '78. Southport: Café Royal, 2018. Four titles in a box, Newport Tip 1978, Army Snow Clearance Bridgend 1978, The Queens Jubilee Newport 1977, and Newport Doc Photo Class of '78. Edition of 150 copies. (Note: Café Royal's page about Newport Doc Photo Class of '78 is here.)
- The Queen's Silver Jubilee Newport 1977. Southport: Café Royal, 2018. (Note: Café Royal's page about The Queen's Silver Jubilee Newport 1977 is here.)

=== Books and exhibition catalogues with contributions by Murtha ===
- The book of the year. London: Ink Links, 1980. ISSN 0144-5367.
- No Such Thing as Society: Photography in Britain 1967–1987: From the Arts Council Collection and the British Council Collection. London: Hayward, 2007. By David Alan Mellor. ISBN 978-1-85332-265-5.
- Unpopular Culture: Grayson Perry Selects from the Arts Council Collection. London: Hayward, 2008. By Grayson Perry and Blake Morrison. ISBN 978-1853322679
- Observadores: Fotografos da Cena Britanica de 1930 Ate Hoje. São Paulo: SESI, 2012. ISBN 978-8582050576
- For Ever Amber: Stories From A Film & Photography Collection. Leeds: Pressision, 2015.
- London Nights. London: Hoxton Mini Press. 2018. ISBN 978-1-910566-34-3. With essays by Anna Sparham and poetry by Inua Ellams. Published in conjunction with an exhibition at the Museum of London.

=== Other publications ===
- Do you know what this is doing to my little girl? - Home Truths in the Year Of The Child - a THAC Report. Tyneside Free Press Workshop, 1979. ISBN 9780901242525.
- Burying The Problem - a THAC Report. Tyneside Free Press Workshop, 1980.
- Photoworks. Issue 10. Brighton: Photoworks, 2008. ISBN 978-1903796276. (Note: Photoworks' page for Issue 10 is here.)
- History of Photography, Volume 33, Number 4: Crushing The Social. Routledge, November 2009. ISSN 0308-7298.
- Wombat: Portfolio No. 24: Tish Murtha. Paris: Wombat, September 2016. (Note: Wombat's page about Portfolio No. 24 is here)
- Loose Associations. Volume 4, Number 2: Various. London: The Photographers' Gallery, 2018. ISBN 9786000028091. Includes work by Murtha and Alex Prager. (Note: The Photographers' Gallery page about Volume 4, Number 2 is here)

== Collections ==
Murtha's work is held in the following public collections:

- Arts Council of Great Britain
- British Council
- The AmberSide Collection
- UK UNESCO Memory of the World Register
- National Portrait Gallery, London

== Exhibitions ==
=== Solo exhibitions ===
- Youth Unemployment, Side Gallery, Newcastle upon Tyne, England and touring, 1981
- Juvenile Jazz Bands, Side Gallery, Newcastle upon Tyne, England and touring, 1979
- Save Scotswood Works, Side Gallery, Newcastle upon Tyne, England and touring, 1979
- Tish Murtha: Works 1976 – 1991, The Photographers' Gallery, London, 2018. Co-curated by Gordon MacDonald and Val Williams.
- Tish Murtha - England 78 - 81, Willy Brandt Haus, Berlin, 2019

=== Group exhibitions ===
- Childhoods - 1977 to 2016, 2016, Side Gallery, Newcastle upon Tyne, UK
- For Ever Amber, 2015, Laing Art Gallery, Newcastle upon Tyne, UK
- True/Grit – A Celebration of Northern Realism, 2013, Side Gallery, Newcastle upon Tyne, UK
- Observers: British Photography and the British Scene, 2012, Serviço Social da Indústria (SESI), São Paulo Visual Arts Month, São Paulo, Brazil
- Paul Graham, Tish Murtha and Markéta Luskačová, Look 11: Liverpool International Photography Festival, 2011, Baltic Triangle, Liverpool, UK
- Unpopular Culture – Grayson Perry Selects from the Arts Council Collection, 2008-2010, Hayward Gallery, London, and touring (De La Warr Pavilion, Bexhill-on-Sea; Harris Museum, Preston; Royal Museum and Art Gallery, Canterbury; DLI Museum & Durham Art Gallery, Durham; Southampton City Art Gallery, Southampton; Aberystwyth Arts Centre, Aberystwyth; Scarborough Art Gallery, Scarborough; Longside Gallery, Wakefield; Victoria Art Gallery, Bath; Mead Gallery, Coventry)
- No Such Thing As Society: Photography in Britain 1968-1987, 2008-2010, Hayward Gallery, London, and touring (Aberystwyth Arts Centre, Wales; Tullie House, Carlisle; City Art Gallery, Leeds; The Exchange, Penzance; Ujazdowski Castle Centre for Contemporary Arts, Warsaw, Poland; Arbets Museum, Norrkoping, Sweden; National Museum of Wales, Cardiff; Laing Art Gallery, Newcastle upon Tyne)
- London By Night, 1983, The Photographers' Gallery, London
- London Nights, Museum of London, London, May–November 2018
- Idea of North, Baltic Centre for Contemporary Art, Gateshead, UK, 2018
- Distinctly, Pingyao International Photography Festival, Pingyao, China, September 2018. Work by Murtha and Martin Parr, Chris Killip, Daniel Meadows, John Myers, Markéta Luskačová, Robert Darch, Ken Grant, Paul Seawright, Niall McDiarmid, Elaine Constantine, and Kirsty Mackay.
