= Anastasia Taylor-Lind =

English-Swedish photojournalist

Anastasia Taylor-Lind (born 1981) is an English and Swedish photojournalist. She works for leading editorial publications globally on issues relating to women, population and war. She has lived in Damascus, Beirut, Kyiv and New York City and is now based in London. As a photographic storyteller, Taylor-Lind's work has focused on long-form narrative reportage for monthly magazines.

== Life and work ==
Taylor-Lind was born in Swindon in 1981. and completed degrees in documentary photography from the University of Wales, Newport, (BA) and the London College of Communication (MA). In 2003 whilst studying for her degree she spent a month in Iraqi Kurdistan photographing female Peshmerga fighters, the Peshmerga Force for Women.

As a photographic storyteller, Taylor-Lind's work has focused on long-form narrative reportage for monthly magazines. She is a National Geographic contributor, and other clients include Vanity Fair, The New Yorker, Time, The New York Times, British Journal of Photography, 6 Mois, Bloomberg Businessweek, The Telegraph, Human Rights Watch, Wired, and Nieman Reports

Taylor-Lind has been engaged with education, teaching at leading universities around the world. She is a TED fellow and gave a talk at the 2014 TED conference in Rio De Janeiro. Taylor-Lind is also Harvard Nieman fellow 2016, where she spent a year researching war, and how we tell stories about modern conflict. She is also a Logan fellow 2017 at the Carey Institute for Global Good.

Her first book Maidan: Portraits from the Black Square, which documents the Euromaidan protests in Kyiv, was published by GOST books the same year, reviewed in the British Journal of Photography and The Guardian. The Guardian's Sean O'Hagan wrote of the book

Maidan – Portraits from the Black Square is a powerfully concentrated statement, both about the nature and cost of violent protest. It eschews the familiar route of visceral, on-the-ground reportage for something more restrained and considered. You look into the faces of these ordinary people and you cannot help but wonder what it took to bring them to this point and what has happened to them since.

She published her second monograph, The Devil's Horsemen, in September 2018.

A wide variety of organizations have recognized and supported her projects through awards such as the Pictures of the Year International, Sony World Photography Awards, Royal Photographic Society Bursaries and the FNAC Grant at Visa pour l'Image.

Together with journalist Alisa Sopova, Taylor-Lind has been documenting the war in eastern Ukraine since it began. Her work has been published in The New York Times, Time the Associated Press and the BBC World Service.

In 2019 Taylor-Lind documented New York City's childcare crisis for Time magazine. An exhibition of the work was shown as one of Fotografiska's inaugural exhibitions opening in 2020.

In 2020, Taylor-Lind published a photo album series titled "5 km from the frontline", which showcased the reality of everyday life Ukrainians who live near the front line of the frozen conflict in Donbas. Her 2023 exposition "Ukraine: Photographs from the Frontline" was presented at the Imperial War Museum and subsequently at Verdun's Memorial. She was injured in June 2023 in a missile attack in Kramatorsk.

Taylor-Lind's debut collection, One Language, won the 2021 International Book & Pamphlet Competition judged by Daljit Nagra & Pascale Petit. It was published by Smith|Doorstop in 2022. Maggie Mackay, in her review of the four prize-winning collections of the year, wrote that One Language was "as close to war as I hope I’ll ever be".

In 2025, she was part of Alfredo Jaar's exhibition Inferno & Paradiso for Cortona On The Move.

== Publications ==
=== Publications by Taylor-Lind ===
- Maidan: Portraits from the Black Square. London: GOST, 2014. ISBN 978-0-9574272-8-0. 160 pages. Edition of 750 copies. With an interview with Taylor-Lind by Gordon MacDonald.
- The Devil's Horsemen. London. 2018. ISBN 978-1-9164150-03. 368 pages. Edition of 3000 copies.
- One Language. Sheffield: The Poetry Business, 2022. ISBN 978-1-914914-10-2. 60 pages.

=== Publications with contributions by Taylor-Lind ===
- Great Britons of Photography Vol.1: The Dench Dozen. Eastbourne, UK: Hungry Eye, 2016. ISBN 978-0-9926405-2-1. Edited by Peter Dench. With photographs by and transcripts of interviews between Dench and Taylor-Lind, Jocelyn Bain Hogg, Marcus Bleasdale, Harry Borden, John Bulmer, Chris Floyd, Brian Griffin, Laura Pannack, Martin Parr, Tom Stoddart, and Homer Sykes. 160 pages. Edition of 500 copies.

== Awards ==
- 2004: "Highly Commended" in the Observer Hodge award
- 2006: Top prize and winner of Portrait category, Guardian Weekend Photography Prize, The Guardian
- 2007 to 2009: Nominated for the Magenta Foundation Emerging Photographers Award
- 2009: Winner, Deutsche Bank Awards in photography
- 2011: Selected for the World Press Photo, Joop Swart Masterclass World Press Photo
- 2012: 3rd place, Arts Culture, Professional, Sony World Photography Awards, World Photography Organisation, London
- 2012: Shortlist, Professional Competition, Sony World Photography Awards, World Photography Organisation, London
- 2014: Ted Fellow Recipient, TED
- 2016: Nieman Fellowship Recipient, Harvard University
