= Peter Dench =

British photojournalist (born 1972)

- Born: April 23, 1972 (age 54); Weymouth, Dorset
- Education: University of Derby (1995)
- Occupations: Photojournalist, photographer, writer, curator, educator, TV presenter
- Years active: 1998–present
- Website: peterdench.com

Peter Dench (born 23 April 1972) is a British photojournalist, photographer, writer, curator, educator and TV presenter. His work has been published in a number of books. In 2025, Dench served as Acting Features Editor at Amateur Photographer.

== Early life and education ==
Dench was born and grew up in Weymouth, Dorset. He graduated from the University of Derby with a degree in Photographic Studies in 1995 and has been working as a photojournalist since 1998. He currently lives in Crouch End, London.

== Career ==
Dench spent a decade documenting England, which he split into the following themes: drinkUK, ethnicUK, rainUK, loveUK, royalUK, summerUK, fashionUK, and Carry on England.

He was a member of the photo agency Independent Photographer's Group (IPG) from 2000 until the company's closure in 2005. In January 2012 he joined Reportage by Getty Images as one of their Represented Photographers (later known as Getty Verbatim).

Around 2007 Dench spent 15 months photographing Football's Hidden Story in 20 countries as a commission for FIFA, documenting "the way in which the sport thrives in the most improbable circumstances and in which enthusiasm for the game is being harnessed for the good of the community".

A Day Off in the Lives of Europe is a project in which he photographed people around Europe commemorating events of national significance.

Dench says of his work:

I’m always looking for humour in my pictures. Charlie Chaplin is a big influence and I often try to address serious subjects in a humorous way when appropriate. My aim is to make people laugh, make people think. Looking through the books of Elliott Erwitt and Martin Parr is the reason I got into photography. If you can travel the world making people laugh and making them think, then to me that's a fine way to live.

The Visa pour l'image photojournalism festival in Perpignan, France, has screened Dench's work multiple times (including Carry On England in 2009) and exhibited it once.

He was described in 2011 as a contributing editor of Hungry Eye magazine and creative director of White Cloth Gallery in Leeds, which he founded with co-creative director Sharon Price. He was a contributor to Professional Photographer magazine podcasts 1 to 13 in 2010/2011. His monthly Dench Diary appeared in Professional Photographer in 2010/11 and in Hungry Eye from 2011.

Dench's advertising commissions have appeared on billboards and bus stop posters, in corporate brochures and in newspapers, including campaigns for Weetabix, Barclaycard, Barclays Wealth, Suzuki, the British Heart Foundation, Danish Bacon and Maxim magazine.

He has made formal portraits of Tom Jones, Vinnie Jones, Heston Blumenthal, Freddie Flintoff, Alain Ducasse, Jamie Oliver, Vijay Mallya, Zöe Lucker, Tamsin Greig, Ahmet Ertegun, Alicia Silverstone and Dermot Desmond.

In February 2012 Dench successfully used the Emphas.is visual journalism crowd funding website to raise funds for his first book, England Uncensored, published in May 2012.

For 6 months in 2013 he collaborated with Reportage by Getty Images on the Future of Britain project, commissioned by OMD UK. Dench photographed the country to accompany OMD's research and statistics on the long-term economic downturn and changes to its population and demographics, published on a blog throughout the period.

In 2015 he founded The Curators with co-founder Director Sharon Price, curating and touring photography exhibitions and Photo North Festival across the UK.

In 2017, as part of his documentary photography, Dench spent a summer photographing British holidaymakers in several European resort towns for his project The British Abroad, capturing social behavior in locations including Ayia Napa, Sunny Beach, Ibiza, and Magaluf.

In February 2018, The Guardian featured Dench’s photograph from the Epsom Derby, taken in June 2001 as part of his decade-long project documenting English drinking culture.

Dench’s A1: Britain on the Verge, shot along the A1 road in 2017, was exhibited in London in January 2018 and documented social conditions in communities along the route.

In 2019, Dench released the photo book Trans-Siberian World Cup and presented an exhibition of the project at After Nyne Gallery in London, documenting his journey along the Trans-Siberian Railway during the 2018 FIFA World Cup; the series was also included in a BBC In Pictures feature. In the same year, It’s Nice That published an article on Dench’s The English Summer Season, a project documenting a range of English summer events and social scenes, many of which were later included in a book of the same title.

In November 2021, Dench wrote a tribute to the British photojournalist Tom Stoddart, reflecting on Stoddart’s influence on his own career following Stoddart’s death at age 67.

In 2024, Dench co-curated the fifth edition of the Photo North Festival in Leeds, a multi-day event of exhibitions, talks, screenings, and networking aimed at professional and emerging photographers.

In May 2025, The Observer featured Dench’s work on Derby Day 2001 as part of a discussion of his long-running project on English drinking culture.

Dench is co-founder and co- director of the Photo North Festival, an annual photography event held in Leeds that features exhibitions, talks, and screenings for photographers and audiences. and tours across the UK.

== Publications ==
=== Publications by Dench ===
- England Uncensored. Dublin: Emphas.is, 2012. ISBN 978-1-909076-00-6.
- The Dench Diary: The Diary of a Sometimes Working Professional Photographer. Eastbourne: United Nations of Photography, 2013. ISBN 978-1-909135-11-6. Edition of 250 copies.
- A&E: Alcohol and England. Liverpool: Bluecoat, 2014. ISBN 978-1908457233.
- The British Abroad. Liverpool: Bluecoat, 2014. (Note: The publication date printed in the book is 2014 but the book was actually published in 2015.) ISBN 9781908457264. With an introduction and afterword by Dench.
- Dench Does Dallas. Liverpool: Bluecoat, 2015. ISBN 978-1908457295. With a foreword by Dench.
- The English Summer Season. Little Neston, UK: Fistful, 2019. Edition of 125 copies.

=== Zines by Dench ===
- Suited and Booted. Southport: Café Royal, 2013. Edition of 150 copies. (Note: Its web page is www.caferoyalbooks.com/index.php/shop/suited-and-booted.)
- Trawlermen. Southport: Café Royal, 2015. Edition of 150 copies. (Note: Its web page is www.caferoyalbooks.com/index.php/shop/suited-and-booted.)
- The English Summer Season. Fistful of Books, 2019. Edition of 100 copies.
- Football’s Hidden Story. Fistful of Books, 2019. Edition of 125 copies.
- Sun, Sea & Covid-19. Fistful of Books, 2020. Edition of 125 copies.
- Lockdown Fanatical Football Fans. Fistful of Books, 2020. Edition of 125 copies.
- The Tale of the Tape. Fistful of Books, 2020. Edition of 125 copies.

=== Publications edited or with contributions by Dench ===
- Joop Swart Masterclass 10 Years. Amsterdam: World Press Photo, 2004. ISBN 90-803698-2-9.
- UK at Home – a celebration of where we live and love. Included Pics for pickers. London: Duncan Baird, 2008. ISBN 978-1-84483-652-9.
- Sony World Photography Awards 2010. Featured Someone's Had Their Weetabix. Paris: Verlhac, 2010. ISBN 978-2-916954-56-1.
- Professional Photography: The New Global Landscape Explained. Oxford: Focal, 2014. ISBN 978-0415717540. By Grant Scott. With contributions from Dench as well as Alicia Bruce, Chris Floyd, Niall McDiarmid and Jim Mortram.
- Great Britons of Photography Vol.1: The Dench Dozen. Eastbourne, UK: Hungry Eye, 2016. ISBN 978-0-9926405-2-1. With photographs by and transcripts of interviews between Dench and Jocelyn Bain Hogg, Marcus Bleasdale, Harry Borden, John Bulmer, Chris Floyd, Brian Griffin, Laura Pannack, Martin Parr, Tom Stoddart, Homer Sykes, and Anastasia Taylor-Lind. 160 pages. Edition of 500 copies.

== Awards ==
- 2nd place, Advertising category, Sony World Photography Awards
- Roadside Diners, July 1998 selected for National Portrait Gallery's John Kobal Photographic Portrait Award, London, 1999
- George, Naturist, Palm Springs, October 2000 selected for National Portrait Gallery, John Kobal Photographic Portrait Award, London, 2001
- 1 of 12 photographers selected to take part in World Press Photo Joop Swart Masterclass 2002
- 3rd prize, People in the News category, World Press Photo Award, 2002 for Drinking of England
- Marquesa deVarela, social fixer for Hello! magazine, April 2003 selected for National Portrait Gallery's Schweppes Photographic Portrait Prize, London, 2003
- 1st place, Sport category, Football in Liberia, 3rd Annual Photography Masters Cup, International Color Awards, 2009

== Exhibitions ==
=== Solo exhibitions ===
- Finding Faith, Ourhouse Gallery, Brighton, 2006
- LoveUK, Third Floor Gallery, Cardiff, 2010
- England Uncensored, Central European House of Photography (CEHP), Bratislava, Slovakia, 2013
- Dench Does Dallas, Art Bermondsey Project Space, London, 2015; The Gallery at Munro House, Leeds, 2016
- Made in England, Haus der Geschichte, Bonn, Germany, 2019
- Trans-Siberian World Cup, After Nyne Gallery, London, UK, 2019

=== Group exhibitions ===
- Football's Hidden Story, Liberia, The Foto8 Summershow, 2008
- 2 images from loveUK, The Foto8 Summershow, 2010
- Letters from Europe, Ernest Lluch Cultural Center, San Sebastián, Spain, 2011. One of six contributing photographers. Project co-financed by the European Commission's Daphne III programme.
- England Uncensored, White Cloth Gallery, Leeds, UK, 2012

=== Exhibitions at festivals ===
- Drinking of England, GetxoPhoto photography festival, Getxo, Bilbao, Spain, 2010
- England Uncensored – A Decade of Photographing the English, Visa pour l'image festival of photojournalism, Perpignan, France, 2011
- Periscopio festival of photojournalism, Vitoria, Spain, 2011
- Format International Photography Festival, Derby, UK, 2011. Video installation.
- The British Abroad, The International Photoreporter Festival #2, Saint-Brieuc, France, 2013; POP Galleries, Hull International Photography Festival, Hull, UK, 2015
- Alcohol & England, Hull International Photography Festival, Hull, UK, 2016.
- Festival Photo La Gacilly, France, 2025

== Short films ==
- Cosplay (2011) with Ben Turner
- The War & Peace Show (2011) with Ben Turner
