= Colin Jones (photographer) =

English ballet dancer and photographer (1936–2021)

Colin Jones (8 August 1936 – 22 September 2021) was an English ballet dancer-turned-photographer and prolific photojournalist of post-war Britain.

Jones documented facets of social history as diverse as the vanishing industrial working lives of the North East coalfields (Grafters), delinquent Afro-Caribbean youth in London (The Black House), hedonistic 1960s 'Swinging London' with pictures of The Who early in their career, the 1963 race riots in Alabama, Soviet Leningrad, and remnants of a rural Britain now lost to history.

== Ballet dancer ==
Jones was born in 1936. He experienced a war childhood; his father, a Poplar, printer, went away as a soldier on the Burma campaign. Jones' family was evacuated to Essex and he attended a succession of thirteen schools while struggling with dyslexia, before the age of sixteen. One school he attended for only two weeks before it was bombed and reduced to a crater. As a result of his learning difficulties and disrupted education, he was illiterate until the age of 20. Though this drew him to activities where he didn't need to write. At the age of sixteen, he took up ballet lessons. at the Royal Ballet School. In 1960 Jones was called up for national service and served in the Queen's Royal Regiment. Fresh out of the army, he joined the Royal Opera House, later moving to the Touring Royal Ballet and embarking on a nine-month world tour. Jones met, and for four years was married to, the ballerina Lynn Seymour. While on tour and running an errand for Margot Fonteyn, he bought his first camera, a Leica 3C rangefinder, in 1958 and started taking photographs of the dancers and backstage life during the Australian leg of the circuit. Jones admired the available-light backstage photography of Michael Peto, a Hungarian émigré, who agreed to mentor him. He remembers;

There was a Hungarian photographer called Michael Peto who used to hang around the corps du ballet when I was a dancer. He didn't take pictures in the way that the rest did. Instead, he crept around the back and caught us lounging around. Dancers come alive in front of the curtain, but he wanted to snap the reality: the endless tedium of rehearsals in dusty church halls in the North East, the sheer misery of it all. He really inspired me and I became obsessed by the work of other Central European photographers such as André Kertész, who was also a great influence on Cartier-Bresson.

== Photographer ==
Jones took advantage of the ballet company's travel to photograph extensively in the streets of Tokyo, Hong Kong and the Gorbals, Glasgow in 1961. Driving with fellow dancers from Newcastle to Sunderland that year, he saw, north of Birmingham, coal searchers on the spoil-heaps. While on tour in the early 1960s, Jones witnessed the burning of slums in the Philippines, which had been happening while he was sitting across the bay in Manila sipping champagne. The sight of children being bulldozed while they were still in bed affected him greatly, and he said, "I think it was then that I decided to leave the ballet. This is what was happening while I was sipping Krug". Shortly after he turned towards Photography.

In 1962, having changed his career to become a photographer for The Observer, he returned to produce a series of photographs recording the vanishing industrial working poor and mining communities in the North East of England, later publishing the essay as the book Grafters. At The Observer he worked alongside photographers Philip Jones Griffiths and Don McCullin. He worked in Fleet Street for several years before turning freelance. Commissioned assignments took him to New York City in 1962; Liverpool docks in 1963; the race riots in Birmingham, Alabama, USA, where he made portraits of both 'Bull' Connor, and Dr Martin Luther King in 1963; and Leningrad, USSR in 1964. In 1966 he photographed the British rock band The Who at the beginning of their career, and Pete Townshend, then Mick Jagger in 1967. He travelled to the Philippines in 1969 where he photographed the sex trade. He portrayed significant dancers, including Rudolph Nureyev for several publications.

== The Black House ==
Jones was commissioned by the Sunday Times Magazine in 1973 to document the Islington-based Harambee housing project for Afro-Caribbean youth (the name 'Harambee' is Swahili for 'pulling together'). The Sunday Times front cover article 'On the edge of the Ghetto' resulted from his frequent visits to the dilapidated terraced house on Holloway Road, a refuge for troubled young black men which was run by a charismatic Caribbean migrant, Brother Herman Edwards. The project, often visited by the police, was an irritant to neighbours, who complained of noise and overcrowding. Jones gained the trust of the youths he photographed, many of whom embraced their portrayal in the media as delinquents, reinforcing their status as outcasts. The building was named the Black House both by residents and by newspaper editors in sensationalist headlines, attempting to associate it with the reputation of the notorious original 'Black House' commune also on Holloway Road, a mile away, run by Michael de Freitas and which had wound up in autumn 1970 and later burned in suspicious circumstances. This first generation of Afro-Caribbean young people to be born in Britain experienced prejudice and disadvantage in education, employment and with the law, and Jones humanised what had been a one-sided news story. Supported by grants from the Gulbenkian Foundation and the Arts Council, Jones continued to photograph the project until 1976 when the housing project dissolved. The archive of works is now being digitised by Jones' agent, TopFoto.co.uk

== Recognition ==
Jones' work has been published in major publications including The Times, National Geographic, Life, Geo and Nova as well as many supplements for major broadsheet newspapers, most prominently The Sunday Times, which dubbed Jones 'The George Orwell of British photography'. In his later career he covered assignments around the world, including Jamaica in 1978; the indigenes of the New Hebrides and Zaire in 1980; Tom Waits in New York, 1981; San Blas Islands in 1982; Ireland in 1984; Xian, China in 1985; Ladakh in northern India in 1994 and Bunker Hill, Kansas in 1996.

Solo exhibitions have been devoted to his work: The Black House: Colin Jones at The Photographers' Gallery in London, 4 May – 4 June 1977 as well as at other galleries (see Exhibitions below). Martin Harrison's Young Meteors associated Jones with other important British photographers including Don McCullin and Terence Donovan. In 2013 the Victoria and Albert Museum acquired three of Jones' historic photographs from The Black House series, along with a photograph by Dennis Morris depicting the original Black House associated with Michael X, both acquired as part of Staying Power, a five year partnership between the V&A and Black Cultural Archives, preserving black British experience from the 1950s to the 1990s through photographs and oral histories. The Arts Council also bought his work.

In 2024 his nephew Kim Jones published an album of Jones's works for Dior Homme spring fashion show.

== Exhibitions ==
=== Solo exhibitions ===
- The Black House: Colin Jones, The Photographers' Gallery, London, 1977
- The Black House – Colin Jones, Michael Hoppen Gallery, London, 2007
- Fifty Years of The Who by Colin Jones, Proud Camden, 2014
- A Life with The Royal Ballet by Colin Jones, Proud Chelsea, 2015
- Retrospective – Colin Jones, Michael Hoppen Gallery, London, 2016
- The Who: Colin Jones, Aperture Leica, London, 2019/20
- Backstage at the Ballet North Wall Arts Centre, Oxford, 2020
- Colin Jones Ballet in the 1960s TopFoto digital Gallery

=== Group exhibitions ===
- Country Matters, James Hyman Gallery, London, 2013. Photographs by Jones, Bert Hardy, Roger Mayne, Tony Ray-Jones, Homer Sykes, Chris Killip, Sirkka-Liisa Konttinen, Martin Parr, Mark Power, Anna Fox, and Ken Grant.
- Jerusalem, Michael Hoppen Gallery, London, 2011. Photographs by Jones, John Davies, Charles Jones.
- Stars of the East – Peter Blake, Colin Jones, Frank Worth, Britart Gallery, London, 2002

== Publications ==
=== Publications by Jones ===
- Grafters. Phaidon, 2002. ISBN 978-0-7148-4253-0.

=== Publications with others ===
- Great Rivers of the World. London: Hodder & Stoughton, 1984. ISBN 978-0008383381. Edited by Alexander Frater and with photographs by Jones.
- The Black House. Munich; London: Prestel, 2006. ISBN 978-3791336718. Photographs by Jones and text by Mike Phillips.

== Collections ==
Jones' work is held in the following permanent collection:

- National Portrait Gallery, London: 2 prints (as of 30 September 2021)
