= Graham Finlayson =

British photojournalist

Graham Scott Finlayson (1932–1999) was an English photojournalist who first worked for the Daily Mail and the Guardian, and later freelanced.

== Life and career ==
Finlayson was born in Ecclesall, Yorkshire in 1932 He started work at the Southampton Echo, but after national service "with the RAF air–sea rescue division" worked in Manchester, first for the Daily Mail and from 1959 for the Guardian, in Manchester (replacing Bob Smithies, who moved to London).

Finlayson was generous in photographing the Hallé Orchestra.

Finlayson was able to photograph L. S. Lowry, usually uncooperative with the press, and had a particularly successful working relationship with the writer Arthur Hopcraft.

The Guardian did not restrict Finlayson to the Manchester area, instead sending him on assignments to such places as Ireland, Spain, Cyprus, Borneo, Nigeria and Indonesia.

In 1963 Finlayson left the Guardian and Manchester to freelance, basing himself in Hampshire. The timing was good, as the colour supplements of Britain's Sunday newspapers were starting up. He did well among them, and later successfully covered sports (in which he was not interested) for Sports Illustrated. He also covered architecture, industry, fashion, and travel.

Toward the end of a warm obituary for Finlayson, Bob Smithies wrote that he "suffered from melancholia [. . .] he was never sure of his worth, satisfied with his endeavours or convinced of his value to those who valued him"; after heart trouble in the early 1990s he gave up photography and moved with his wife to France. He died of cancer in 1999.

Even while Finlayson was still working as a photographer, his earlier work had become little remembered. Martin Harrison credits a 1983 exhibition at the Photographers' Gallery, British Photography 1955–65 (curated by Sue Davies), with saving his work (as well as that of John Bulmer and others) from obscurity; much later, Harrison would go on to show it in a 1998 exhibition titled The Young Meteors.

== Exhibitions ==
=== Solo exhibitions ===
- Graham Finlayson: Early photographs, The Newsroom, The Guardian and Observer Archive and Visitor Centre (London), January–March 2005.
- Graham Finlayson: Simply Black and White, The Lowry (Salford), 2006.

=== Group exhibitions ===
- British Photography 1955–1965: The Master Craftsmen in Print, The Photographers' Gallery (London), 1983.
- The Young Meteors: British Photojournalism 1957–1965, National Museum of Photography, Film and Television (Bradford), July–November 1998; Focus Gallery (London), 1999.
- A Long Exposure: 100 Years of Pictures from Guardian Photographers in Manchester (1908–2008), The Lowry (Salford), October 2008 – March 2009. With Walter Doughty, Tom Stuttard, Bob Smithies, Don McPhee and Denis Thorpe. (Note: The exhibition was described as also presenting work by Neil Libbert. Libbert is profiled in the (unpaginated) book that accompanied the exhibition, but the profile says "Sadly none of Neil Libbert's photographs were available for this exhibition.")
- Saturday Night and Sunday Morning: The Authentic Moment in British Photography, Djanogly Art Gallery, Lakeside Arts Centre, University of Nottingham, November 2012 – February 2013.

== Collections ==
- Guardian News & Media Archive.

== Publications ==
- Paul Jennings, text; Graham Finlayson, photographs. Just a Few Lines: Guinness Trains of Thought. London: Guinness Superlatives, 1969. ISBN 0900424508. About the Colne Valley, Scarborough–Whitby, Oxford–Fairford, and Neath–Brecon rail lines.
- Frank Tuohy, text; Graham Finlayson, photographs. Portugal. London: Thames & Hudson, 1970. ISBN 0500240663
  - Portugal. Orbis terrarum. Zürich and Freiburg i. Breisgau: Atlantis, 1970. Translated into German by Aurelia Bundschuh. OCLC 253064204.
  - Portugal. Paris: Braun, 1970. Translated into French by Maryvonne Menget. OCLC 462670530.
- Graham Finlayson: Simply Black and White. Salford Quays: Lowry Press, 2006. ISBN 9781902970318.
