= Christopher Floyd (disambiguation) =

Christopher Floyd is an English barrister and judge.

Christopher or Chris Floyd may also refer to:

- Chris Floyd (born 1975), American football player
- Chris Floyd (photographer), British photographer
- Christopher Floyd, character in 2010
- Chris Floyd, character in 2061: Odyssey Three
