= Andor Kraszna-Krausz =

Hungarian and British publisher and writer of photographic literature (1904–1989)

- Born: Andor Krausz; 12 January 1904; Szombathely, Hungary
- Died: 24 December 1989 (aged 85); Buckinghamshire, England
- Education: Technical Institute; School of Photography and Cinematography
- Occupations: Publisher and writer of photographic literature
- Known for: Founder of Focal Press

Andor Kraszna-Krausz (12 January 1904 – 24 December 1989), born Andor Krausz, was a Hungarian and British publisher and writer of photographic literature; he founded Focal Press in 1938.

== Early life and education ==
Andor Krausz was born on 12 January 1904 in Szombathely, Hungary, to Adolf Krausz and Iren Krausz (née Rosenberger). After studying at the local Roman Catholic high school, he enrolled in the Technical Institute in Munich in 1922 and a year later moved to the School of Photography and Cinematography.

He edited the journal Filmtechnik: Filmkunst. Zeitschrift für alle künstlerischen, technischen und wirtschaftlichen Fragen des Filmwesens (Verlag Wilhelm Knapp) after 1926, and lived in Germany until 1937, when he migrated to the United Kingdom.

== Career ==
As a student, he had become interested in publishing, but turned his hand to writing; by the late 1930s, he was an experienced writer on photography.

After arriving in the United Kingdom, he began his own publishing house, Focal Press, which published its first books in 1938; one of those, W. D. Emanuel and F. L. Dash's The All-in-One Camera Book, would be reprinted in 81 editions. Thus began a series of books about the topic; Kraszna-Krausz went on to publish 1,200 books on photography, cinematography and broadcasting, which sold 50 million copies.

Focal Press thereby "became world renown[ed] in the field". By the early 1940s, the company also began publishing large-format picture books of nineteenth-century photography (such as Gallery of Immortal Portraits in 1940 and Victorian Photography in 1942), which Deac Rossell has argued "had a decisive impact on the revival of interest in nineteenth century photography"; a modernist, Kraszna-Krausz's belief in democratic values led him to praise Victorian photographers' amateur inventiveness and exploration of photography.

Across his career, Kraszna-Krausz also developed a reputation for predicting technological change in photography, with The Times calling him a "prophet of the camera arts". His works were especially popular in Germany, where he won the German Society for Photography's Culture Award in 1979. In the United Kingdom, he received an honorary DLitt from the University of Bradford.

In 1982, he established the Kraszna-Krausz Foundation, which continues to make annual awards to people whose books have made "original and lasting educational, professional, historical and cultural contributions to the field".

== Death ==
Kraszna-Krausz died on 24 December 1989, aged 85.
