= Portrait of Britain =

Photography competition

Portrait of Britain is an annual British portrait photography award run by the British Journal of Photography. Its subject is the diversity of British people. The 100 winning portraits are displayed on JCDecaux's digital screens across Britain throughout the month of January. It launched in 2016.

Since 2018, an eponymously titled book has been published with 200 of the shortlisted portraits from each year.

== Details ==
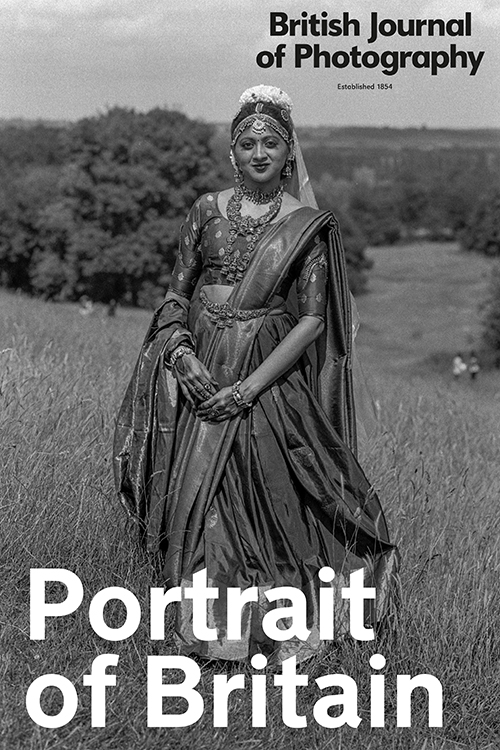
One of the winning portraits from the 2023 competition

The competition's subject is the diversity of British people "and the way their narratives reflect its widely unstable political and social landscape." It was partly inspired by Brexit.

It is open to anyone to enter but photographs must have been taken within the previous six years and "depict subjects living in the UK (England, Scotland, Wales & Northern Ireland) at the time of the photograph," the British nationals of the British Overseas Territories (those parts of the British Realm outwith the archipelago of the British Isles) being excluded.

The 100 winning portraits are displayed on the outdoor advertising company JCDecaux's digital screens located in railway stations, shopping centres, bus stops and high streets. Each image appears on each screen for five to ten seconds.

The competition ran in September 2016, September 2017 September 2018, December 2021 September 2022, 2023, and 2024 with winners announced the following year.

== Publications ==
- Portrait of Britain. London: Hoxton Mini Press, 2018. ISBN 978-1-910566-38-1. With an introduced by Will Self. Work by 200 photographers alongside information about each image and selected quotes from the photographers.
- Portrait of Britain: Vol 2. London: Hoxton Mini Press, 2019. ISBN 978-1-910566-54-1. With an introduction by Ekow Eshun.
- Portrait of Britain: Vol 3. London: Hoxton Mini Press, 2020. ISBN 978-1-910566-77-0. With an introduction by David Olusoga.
- Portrait of Britain: Vol 4. London: Hoxton Mini Press, 2022. ISBN 978-1-914314-13-1. With an introduction by Jess Phillips.
- Portrait of Britain: Vol 5. London: Hoxton Mini Press, 2023. With an introduction by Rachel Segal Hamilton.
- Portrait of Britain: Vol 6. London: Bluecoat, 2024. With an introduction by Simon Bainbridge.
- Portrait of Britain: Vol 7. London: Bluecoat, 2025. With an introduction by Diane Smyth.
