= Willie Carson (photo journalist) =

Northern Irish photojournalist

Willie Carson (1926 – 6 October 1996) was a Northern Irish photo-journalist. Born in Derry, his photographs were published throughout the world at the height of The Troubles.

In 1945, Carson began working as a salesman for the local Derry Journal newspaper. He worked at the newspaper for 11 years before deciding to become a freelance photographer. With the start of the conflict in Northern Ireland, Carson's work, along with many others', became widely viewed around the world, and photographers from all over the world visited and stayed at his home, using his back yard dark room to process their films and his front room to dry their prints.

As well as documenting The Troubles, Carson also continued to capture the Derry life that continued alongside the conflict, and the changes in the town brought by redevelopment. Carson was the author of several books about life in Derry, including Derry Thru The Lens, Yesterday..., A Decade and a Half and So this was Derry.

In the 1990s Carson was working on another publication bringing his work into the present day, but died before this project was completed. He died on 6 October 1996, aged 70, having been diagnosed with lung cancer in July 1995. His funeral was attended by John Hume and Martin McGuinness, and Ian Paisley wrote a tribute to him in the Belfast Telegraph following his death in 1996. In 2006, a posthumous collection of his photographic work named after his first book of 1976 - Derry Thru The Lens: Refocus - was published by Guildhall Press, in co-operation with Carson's family.
