= Alastair Thain =

Photographer

Alastair Thain (born 1961) is a German-born photographer. His portraits were published in 1991 as Skin Deep, and many are held in the collection of the National Portrait Gallery, London. With Tom Stoddart, he made work about the Siege of Sarajevo, which was exhibited at the Royal Festival Hall in London and published as a book.

== Early life and education ==
Thain was born in Düsseldorf, Germany and studied at the London College of Printing.

== Publications ==
- Skin Deep: The Portraits of Alastair Thain. Viking, 1991. ISBN 978-0670826278. With an essay by Jane Withers.
- Edge of Madness: Sarajevo, a city and its people under siege. London: Royal Festival Hall, 1997. With Tom Stoddart.

== Exhibitions ==
=== Solo exhibitions or with one other person ===
- Edge of Madness – Sarajevo a City and Its People Under Siege, Royal Festival Hall, London, 1997. With Tom Stoddart.
- Marines: Portraits by Alastair Thain, externally, Imperial War Museum North, Manchester, 2009

=== Group exhibitions ===
- How We Are: Photographing Britain, Tate Britain, London, 2007. Co-curated by Susan Bright and Val Williams.

== Collections ==
Thain's work is held in the following permanent collection:

- National Portrait Gallery, London: 23 portrait prints (as of 30 November 2021)
