= Jim Mortram =

British social documentary photographer and writer

Jim A. Mortram (born 10 September 1971) is a British social documentary photographer and writer, based in Dereham, Norfolk. His ongoing project using photography and writing, Small Town Inertia, records the lives of a number of disadvantaged and marginalised people living near to his home, in order to tell stories he believes are under-reported. This work is published on his website, in a few zines published in 2013, and in the book Small Town Inertia (2017).

== Small Town Inertia ==
Mortram began the Small Town Inertia website in 2006 with the "Market Town" stories. Its name is a reference to the market town of Dereham, where he lives, fifteen miles west of the city of Norwich in Norfolk. Through photography, his writing and the subject's own words, Mortram records the lives of the disadvantaged and marginalised, making repeated visits with a number of people living within three miles of his home. Small Town Inertia tells stories of "isolation, poverty, drug abuse, homelessness, self-harm, mental illness, juvenile crime, and epilepsy", that Mortram believes are otherwise under-reported.

Dave Stelfox wrote in The Guardian that "Mortram's rich, black-and-white images possess a timeless quality that invites easy comparison with the classic documentary work of such British photographers as Chris Steele Perkins, Paul Trevor and Chris Killip."

== Publications ==
=== Publications by Mortram ===
- Small Town Inertia. Liverpool: Bluecoat. With a poem by Jamie Thrashivoulou, "A Privatised Map of Deprivation", and essays by Paul Mason, "A Memento of the Dark Times", and Lewis K. Bush, "A War of Poverty". Hardback, 2017; ISBN 978-1908457363. Paperback, 2018; ISBN 9781908457370.

=== Zines by Mortram ===
- Electric Tears and All Their Portent. Southport: Café Royal, 2013. Edition of 150 copies. (Note: Electric Tears and All Their Portent in the Café Royal Books archive.)
- Living with Epilepsy. Southport: Café Royal, 2013. Edition of 150 copies. (Note: Living with Epilepsy in the Café Royal Books archive.)
- Small Town Inertia: Diary Entries. Southport: Café Royal, 2013. Edition of 150 copies. With a short text by George Szirtes. (Note: Small Town Inertia: Diary Entries in the Café Royal Books archive.)
  - Second edition. Southport: Café Royal, 2022.
- Small Town Inertia: Diary Entries 2. Southport: Café Royal, 2022. With a short essay by Michael Sheen. (Note: Small Town Inertia: Diary Entries 2 in the Café Royal Books archive.)

=== Publications with contributions by Mortram ===
- Professional Photography: The New Global Landscape Explained. Oxford: Focal, 2014. By Grant Scott. ISBN 978-0415717540. With contributions from Mortram, Alicia Bruce, Peter Dench, Chris Floyd, and Niall McDiarmid.

== Solo exhibitions ==
- Small Town Inertia, Bank Street Arts, Sheffield, 2013; Photoville, New York City, 2013; Red Light Gallery, Norwich, 2013; Arts Centre, Edge Hill University, Liverpool, 2014; Camden Image Gallery, Camden, London, 2014; Side Gallery, Newscastle, 2019

== Awards ==
- 2013: one of twenty photographers credited by the British Journal of Photography as "Ones to Watch" in 2013
