= Look Photo Biennial =

Photography festival in Liverpool

Look Photo Biennial (stylised as LOOK Photo Biennial) is a biannual photography festival based in Liverpool, UK. It is a four-week programme that takes place in various venues in Liverpool and across the North West in April and May. It dates back to 2007 but began in its current format in 2011. From 2018 it is being led by Open Eye Gallery, where the festival is centred.

Prior to 2018 it was called Look - Liverpool International Photography Festival. It runs in the opposing years to Liverpool Biennial.

== Focus and activities ==
The Look website states "LOOK Photo Biennial is about how we see the world through lenses, screens, culture, contexts. ... We want to think about how we can overcome our visual reflexes, and see the drastic changes taking place right now in the UK and across the globe through fresh eyes."

The festival includes archive work, recent work and newly commissioned work by emerging and established artists from Liverpool, the UK and elsewhere. The majority of work is new or being shown in the UK for the first time.

The festival takes place over four weeks and includes exhibitions, conferences, talks, tours, workshops, participation activities, screenings, competitions and fringe activities.

== History ==
The Look - Liverpool International Photography Festival "launched in 2011 as a response to a series of events initiated by Manchester-based photography network Redeye in 2007 (Look07)."

From 2018 it is being led by Open Eye Gallery.

== Biennials ==
=== 2011 – LOOK/11 ===
The artistic director was Stephen Snoddy. It included work by Edward Burtynsky, Homer Sykes, John Davies, Donovan Wylie, Robert Polidori and Mitch Epstein.

Venues included Walker Art Gallery, International Slavery Museum, Liverpool Hope University and Open Eye Gallery.

=== 2013 – LOOK/13 ===
The theme was "Who do you think you are?". The director was Patrick Henry. It included work by Barbara Kruger, Martin Parr, Rankin, August Sander, Weegee, Tom Wood and an exhibition curated by Imogen Stidworthy.

Venues included Open Eye Gallery, Bluecoat Chambers, Walker Art Gallery and The Cornerhouse Gallery at Liverpool Hope University, Tate Liverpool, Foundation for Art and Creative Technology, Liverpool John Moores University Exhibition Research Centre, Victoria Gallery & Museum.

=== 2015 – LOOK/15 ===
It was held at various venues including Bluecoat Chambers and Open Eye Gallery.

=== 2017 – LOOK/17 ===
It was curated by Ying Kwok. The theme was "Cities of Exchange" and incorporated Hong Kong as an exchange city.

It included work by Wong Wo Bik.

== See also ==
- Brighton Photo Biennial
- Format International Photography Festival
