= Guildhall Press =

Irish publishing house

Guildhall Press is an independent publisher based at the Ráth Mór Centre in Derry, Northern Ireland.

== History ==
Founded in 1979 as Guildhall Children's Press, an educational trust, Guildhall Press is supported by a voluntary committee of academics and professionals. The organization was created to research and publish the social, historical, and cultural history of Derry and the North West of Ireland.

In 2002, the organization was reconstituted as a social enterprise under its current name. It worked in partnership with the community development group Creggan Enterprises to develop projects such as the Unlocking Silent Heritage project which was funded through Derry City and Strabane District Council's PEACEPLUS Local Co-Designed Action Plan.

Today, Guildhall publishes titles covering local history, literature, photography, fiction, and poetry, many of which are catalogued in national bibliographic databases, including Irish History Online and the Internet Archive.

== Publications ==
In November 2012, Guildhall Press produced Derry Journal:The Lost Archives, the first in a series of photographic titles based on the archives of the Derry Journal and compiled by journalist/editor Sean McLaughlin. Five other titles followed, the last being Derry Feis: The Golden Years which came out in 2022. The titles contained images covering life, people and events in and around Derry for the period from the 1960s to the 1990s.

Other titles from Guildhall Press covering various aspects of the Northern Ireland conflict referred to as the Troubles include:

- The Battle of Bogside by Clive Limpkin (revised edition), republished by Guildhall Press in 2019 in association with the Museum of Free Derry and the Bloody Sunday Trust. The original work by Limpkin won the Robert Capa Gold Medal in 1972.
- Murals of Derry (1995/Updated editions) by Guildhall Press. Photographs of Derry murals past and present that reflect the cultural diversity of both main traditions in the north of Ireland over several decades.
- Derry's Troubled Years by Eamon Melaugh. A collection of images depicting life in Derry during the early days of the Troubles, mostly between 1968-1974.
- Beyond the Silence: Women's Unheard Voices from the Troubles edited by Julieann Campbell (2016). An oral history collection focusing on the forgotten experiences of women during the conflict. The project was supported by the International Fund for Ireland and Creggan Enterprises.
- If Streets Could Speak by Brendan Mc Keever. A record of conflict-related deaths in Derry and the surrounding area from 1968 to 2018, listing locations, dates and circumstances.

== Authors ==
Guildhall Press also published numerous fiction, literary and local history titles by authors such as:

- Garbhan Downey, journalist, novelist and publisher
- Julieann Campbell, poet, author and journalist
- Desmond J Doherty, solicitor and crime writer
- Dave Duggan,dramatist and novelist, writing in English and in Irish
- Adrian Kerr, author, historian and curator of Museum of Free Derry
- Hugh Gallagher, photographer and author

== Arts projects ==
Guildhall Press partnered with Creggan Enterprises in 2013 to produce the Eastway Wall Reimaging Art Project. It also received Big Lottery funding for a Cultural Showcases project in 2013. The Community Relations Council and Big Lottery supported the research for Creggan: The Next Chapter produced in partnership with Creggan Enterprises in April 2022.

ImageDerry Photographic Archive

In 2022, Guildhall Press developed ImageDerry, a photographic archive featuring selected images by local photographers on Derry's social history and its hinterland in Donegal and the North West of Ireland. An exhibition of photographs from ImageDerry was featured in the 2023 PhotoIreland Festival at the Ráth Mór Centre in Derry. The ImageDerry exhibition included the work of Derry photographers Hugh Gallagher, Brendan Mc Keever, Raymond Craig, Phil Cunningham, Willie Curran and Joe McAllister.
