= Bluecoat Press =

Publisher based in London, England

Coordinates: 51.53300°N 0.05671°W

Bluecoat Press is a publisher based in London. Established in 1992, Bluecoat Press takes its name from the Bluecoat Chambers, in central Liverpool, where it was based from 1992 until 2003.

Founded by Colin Wilkinson, it specialised in mainly local and regional (Liverpool and north west England) books with an emphasis on photography. Following changes in the book market after the 2008 financial crisis, Bluecoat Press shifted its emphasis to books about British social documentary photography and photojournalism—publishing monographs by photographers including John Bulmer, Peter Dench, Tish Murtha, Chris Steele-Perkins, Margaret Mitchell, Marilyn Stafford, Denis Thorpe, Nick Hedges, Paul Trevor, Jim Mortram, Patrick Ward and Charlie Phillips.

Bluecoat Press has published over 300 books on subjects ranging from local history, food, art and architecture and autobiographies. It has reduced its output in later years, publishing around eight titles a year

In July 2022, Bluecoat's ownership was transferred to the 1854 Group, owners of the British Journal of Photography, who are continuing with Bluecoat's programme of publishing British documentary photography and photojournalism.
