= Syd Shelton =

British photographer

Syd Shelton (born 1947) is a British photographer who documented the Rock Against Racism movement. His work is held in the collections of Tate and the Victoria and Albert Museum and the National Portrait Gallery. Shelton lives in Hove, East Sussex.

== Life and work ==
Shelton was born in Pontefract in 1947. Having studied fine art in Yorkshire he began his photography practice in the early 1970s, following a move to Australia. In Sydney, Shelton worked as a freelance photo-journalist for newspapers such as Nation Review, The Age, and The Digger. In 1975 he had a solo exhibition of his photographs, Working Class Heroes at the Sydney Filmmakers Co-op.

In 1976, Shelton returned to London and established the design and photography partnership Red Wedge Graphics' which evolved into the current agency Graphicsi. Shelton become one of the key activists in the movement Rock Against Racism (RAR). He was a photographer and one of the designers of the RAR magazine 'Temporary hoarding' which was published between 1976 and 1981. During the 1980s, as well as producing photographs for magazines and the press, and graphics for the public and private sector, Shelton co-edited, and was art director of, a series of photographic books that includes Day in the Life of London, and Ireland: A Week in the Life of a Nation.

He now lives in Hove, East Sussex.

== Publications ==
=== Books of work by Shelton ===
- Rock Against Racism. London: Autograph ABP, 2016. ISBN 978-1-899282-18-0. Co-edited by Mark Sealy and Carol Tulloch. With an essay by Paul Gilroy.
- Rock Against Racism. Los Angeles: Rare Bird Books, 2023. ISBN 978-1-64428-249-6. Co-edited by Mark Sealy and Carol Tulloch. With an essay by Paul Gilroy.
- Syd Shelton, Red Saunders, Malcolm McGregor: A Day in the Life of London. Jonathan Cape Ltd, 1985, 288 pages, ISBN 978-0-224-02975-9.
- Syd Shelton, Red Saunders: Ireland: A Week in the Life of a Nation. Century Hutchinson, 1986, 288 pages, ISBN 978-0-7126-9518-3.
- The Falls. Fistful of Books, 2022. Edited by Simon Robinson.
- Stills from life. Unicorn, 2024. ISBN 978-1-916846-32-6.

=== Zines of work by Shelton ===
- Crowds 1977–1981. Southport: Café Royal, 2019. With a text by Tulloch. Edition of 250 copies. Later reprinted.
- West Belfast 1979. Southport: Café Royal, 2020. Edited by Craig Atkinson.
- Street Portraits. Southport: Café Royal, 2020. Edited by Atkinson.
- The Battle of Lewisham 1977. Southport: Café Royal, 2021. Edited by Atkinson.
- Street Portraits Two. Southport: Café Royal, 2021. Edited by Atkinson.
- Rock Against Racism-Live. Southport: Café Royal, 2022. Edited by Atkinson.
- Street Portraits Three. Southport: Café Royal, 2024. Edited by Atkinson.

== Exhibitions ==
=== Solo exhibitions ===
- Syd Shelton: Rock Against Racism, curated by Mark Sealy and Carol Tulloch, Autograph ABP, Rivington Place, London, 2015; Impressions Gallery, Bradford, 2016; Street Level Photoworks, Glasgow, 2017; Gallery Oldham, Oldham, 2020

=== Group exhibitions ===
- Music Migrations (1962–1989), Cité nationale de l'histoire de l'immigration, Paris, 2019–2020
- Facing Britain – British documentary photography since the 1960s, Museum Goch, Germany, 2020
- Stan Firm inna Inglan: Black Diaspora in London, 1960–70s, Tate Britain, London, 2016/2017
- The Vanishing East End: 1970–1980s, Tower Hamlets Local History Library and Archives, London, October 2021 – February 2022
- The Black Triangle, Atlas Gallery, London, October–December 2022
- I Just Want to be Me, Lucy Bell Gallery, St Leonards on Sea, October 2022 – January 2023
- In the Moment: The Art of Music Photography, Barbican Library, London, June–September 2023
- Seen Not Heard, Atlas Gallery, London, October–June 2024
- The 80s, Photographing Britain, Tate Britain, London, March–June 2025
- Resistance, Turner Contemporary, Margate, March–June 2025

== Collections ==
Shelton's work is held in the following permanent collections:

- Tate, UK: 11 prints (as of April 2024) 4 prints (as of August 2021)
- Victoria and Albert Museum, London: 8 prints (as of April 2020)
- National Portrait Gallery, London: 2 prints (as of September 2021)
- Autograph ABP, London
