= Carol Tulloch =

British author and academic

- Born: Doncaster, England
- Education: Ravensbourne University London; Royal College of Art/V&A
- Occupations: Author and academic
- Employer: University of the Arts London
- Known for: Work on cultural heritage, auto/biography, personal archives and style narratives

Carol Tulloch is a British author and academic who is a Professor of Dress, Diaspora and Transnationalism at the University of the Arts London, known for her work on cultural heritage, auto/biography, personal archives and style narratives.

== Biography ==
Tulloch was born to Jamaican parents in Doncaster, South Yorkshire, England. She studied Fashion and Textile Design at Ravensbourne, and History of Design at the Royal College of Art/V&A. Her curatorial work on black style has resulted in exhibitions at the V&A, articles in academic and popular press, and books that explore style narratives of the African diaspora.

== Bibliography ==
- "There's No Place Like Home: Home Dressmaking and Creativity in the Jamaican Community in the 1940s to 1960s", in: The Culture of Sewing: Gender, Consumption and Home Dressmaking, London: Berg, 1999
- Fashion and Photography (ed.), special edition of Fashion Theory, 2002
- Entry on "Dress", in: The Encyclopaedia of Race and Ethnic Studies, London; New York: Routledge, 2003
- Black Style V&A, 2004
- "Picture This: The Black Curator", in: The Politics of Heritage: Legacies of Race, London; New York : Routledge, 2005
- "James Van Der Zee: Couple in Raccoon Coats", in: The Folio Society Book of the 100 Greatest Photographs, London: The Folio Society, 2006
- The Birth of Cool: Style Narratives of the African Diaspora, Bloomsbury Academic, 2016
- The Persistence of Taste: Art, Museums and Everyday Life After Bourdieu, Routledge, 2018
- "If I Don't do Some Couching I Will Burst", European Journal of Cultural Studies, 2022
- "And Breathe, Style Narratives at Home, March 2020 to March 2021", in 'Everyday health', embodiment, and selfhood since 1950, 2024

== Exhibitions ==
- Black British Style, V&A, 2004–2005
- The March of the Women: Suffragettes and the State, The National Archives, London, 2003
- Picture This: Representations of Black People in Product Promotion, Archives and Museum of Black Heritage Project, 2002
- Grow Up!: Advice and the Teenage Girl, Women's Library, London, 2002–03
- Nails, Weaves and Naturals: Hairstyles and Nail Art of the African Diaspora, A Day of Record, Archives and Museum of Black Heritage Project, 2001
- Jessica Ogden: Still, Church Street, London, 2017
