= Laura Pannack =

British photographer (born 1985)

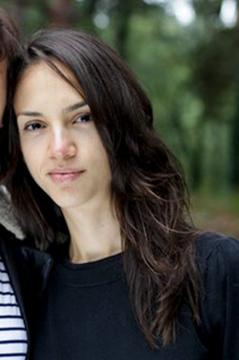
- Born: 1985 (age 40–41); Kingston upon Thames
- Known for: Photography
- Website: www.laurapannack.com

Laura Pannack (born 1985) is a British social documentary and portrait photographer, based in London. Focusing frequently on youth and the passage of time, she often collaborates with adolescents, integrating her interest in psychology through participatory and process-led methods that prioritise trust, duration, and lived experience.

Pannack approaches portraiture not as a fixed representation but as a shared, evolving encounter. .She received first place in the World Press Photo Awards in 2010, the Vic Odden Award from the Royal Photographic Society in 2012, and won the Portfolio category in the Sony World Photography Awards in 2021.

A book, Youth Without Age and Life Without Death, was published by Guest Editions in 2023.

== Early life and education ==
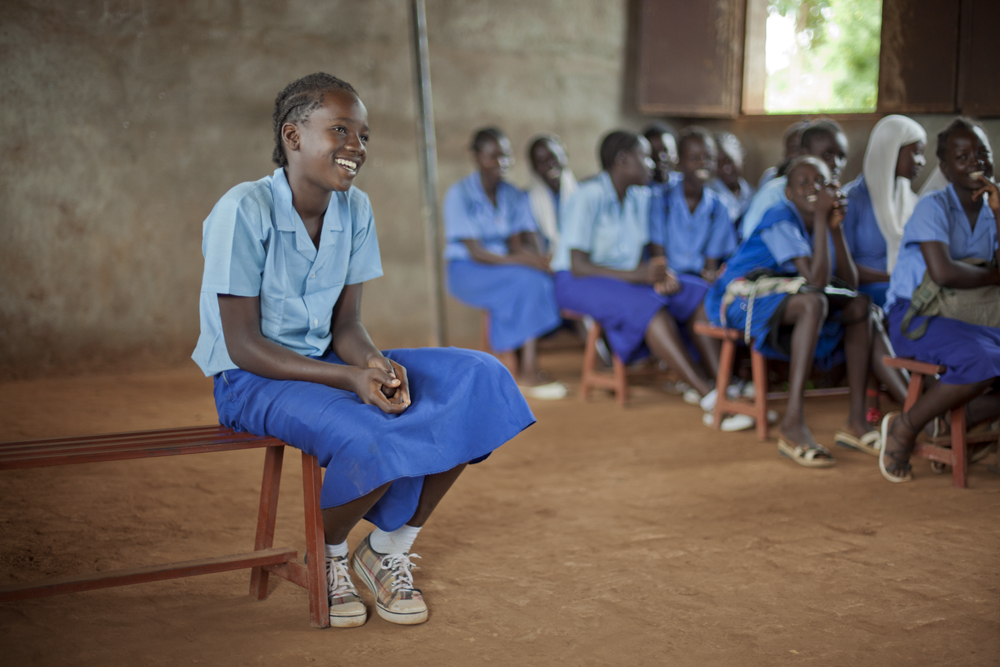
An example of Pannack's work for Oxfam

Pannack was born in Kingston upon Thames, southwest London.

She gained a degree in editorial photography at the University of Brighton; studied a foundation course in painting at Central Saint Martins College of Art, London; and studied a foundation course at London College of Communication.

== Career ==
Pannack works commercially and on self initiated personal projects, her sitters often being "young people and teenagers". Wired covered her work on chess boxing in 2013. Her personal projects include The Untitled, Young Love and Young British Naturists. For her personal work Pannack largely uses analogue film, at one time a Bronica 645 medium format camera and more recently a Hasselblad 6×6. She often uses experimental low fi processes and darkroom techniques.

In 2011 Pannack was included in Creative Review's Ones to Watch list and in 2013 in The Magenta Foundation's Emerging Photographers list.

== Publications ==
=== Publications by Pannack ===
- Against The Dying of The Light. Collection du Prix HSBC pour la Photographie. Arles, France: Actes Sud, 2017. ISBN 978-2-330-07743-3. With a text in French by Christian Caujolle, translated into English by Thyago Nogueira. Published on the occasion of the Prix HSBC Pour La Photographie 2017.
- The Cracker. Multistory, 2019. Magazine format. Edition of 25 copies.
- Youth (Vol. 1). Polite, 2023. Postcard set.
- Youth Without Age and Life Without Death. Guest, 2023.

=== Publications with contributions by Pannack ===
- Hijacked III: Australia / United Kingdom. Cottesloe, W.A.: Big City Press; Heidelberg: Kehrer, 2012. ISBN 9783868282856. Exhibition catalogue.
- Great Britons of Photography Vol.1: The Dench Dozen. Eastbourne, UK: Hungry Eye, 2016. ISBN 978-0-9926405-2-1. Edited by Peter Dench. With photographs by and transcripts of interviews between Dench and Pannack, among others. 160 pages. Edition of 500 copies.

== Exhibitions ==
World Press Photo Contest Exhibition — Royal Festival Hall, London & International Tour

Magenta Foundation — Toronto, Canada

QUAD Gallery — Sydney, Australia

Houses of Parliament, London — Save the Children: Other Lives Touring Exhibition

Somerset House, London — Save the Children: Other Lives Touring Exhibition; Sony World Photography Awards Exhibition

Saatchi Gallery, London — From Selfie to Self-Expression

Forum Meyrin — Geneva, Switzerland

National Portrait Gallery, London — Taylor Wessing Portrait Prize (2012, 2016, 2024); work held in Permanent Collection

New York Photo Festival — New York City

Marion Center for Photographic Arts — Santa Fe, USA

Galerie Esther Woerdehoff — Paris, France

Galleifet Art Center — Aix-en-Provence, France

Museum of Contemporary Art in Krakow (MOCAK) — Krakow, Poland

Francesca Maffeo Gallery — Southend-on-Sea, UK Youth Without Age, Life Without Death: Chapter 1

== Awards ==
  - ▪1st Place, Portraits Singles — World Press Photo Awards ▪Winner, Magenta Foundation (4×) ▪New York Photo Festival — Award Winner ▪Art of Photography Show, San Diego — Award Winner ▪1st Place, Fine Art / Best in Show — Lucie International Photography Awards ▪AOP Awards — Finalist (×3) ▪Sony World Photography Awards — 1st Place, Portfolio ▪Royal Photographic Society — Vic Odden Award ▪John Kobal Award — Taylor Wessing Portrait Prize ▪Judge — World Press Photo Awards ▪LensCulture Awards (×3) ▪Director's Choice — CENTER Awards ▪PH Museum Grant — 1st Place ▪Getty Prestige Grant — 1st Place ▪Prix HSBC pour la Photographie — 1st Place ▪Camera Clara Prix — 1st Place
  - Tom Stoddard award 1st Place
