= Niall McDiarmid =

Scottish photographer

Niall McDiarmid (born 1967) is a Scottish photographer. His work is primarily about documenting the people and landscape of Great Britain. McDiarmid has had solo exhibitions in the UK at Oriel Colwyn in Colwyn Bay, at Museum of London in London and at the Martin Parr Foundation in Bristol. His work is held in the collection of the National Portrait Gallery, London.

== Photography ==
McDiarmid has published three books of street portraits made in Britain: Crossing Paths (2013), for which he "visited 120 towns and photographed 800 subjects over three years"; Via Vauxhall (2015), which "captures passersby traveling through the rapidly changing neighborhood of Vauxhall" in London; and Town to Town (2017) with more portraits from around Britain. Shore (2020) comprises landscapes, portraits and still lives made on the Essex coast. Breakfast (2021) has photographs of his breakfast table made over for the previous four years.

== Publications ==
=== Publications by McDiarmid ===
- Crossing Paths: A Portrait of Britain. London: self-published / Hey Little Heroes, 2013. ISBN 978-0-9926970-0-6. Edition of 500 copies.
- Via Vauxhall. London: self-published / Hey Little Heroes, 2015. ISBN 978-0992697013. Edition of 350 copies.
- Town to Town. Bristol: RRB, 2017. ISBN 1999727509. Edition of 1000 copies.
- Southwestern. London: self-published / Hey Little Heroes, 2019. Edition of 450 copies.
- Shore. London: self-published / Hey Little Heroes, 2020. ISBN 0992697034. Edition of 500 copies.
- Breakfast. London: self-published / Hey Little Heroes, 2021. ISBN 0992697042. Edition of 750 copies.

=== Publications with contributions by McDiarmid ===
- Professional Photography: The New Global Landscape Explained. Oxford: Focal, 2014. By Grant Scott. ISBN 978-0415717540. With contributions from McDiarmid, Alicia Bruce, Peter Dench, Chris Floyd, and Jim Mortram.
- London Nights. London: Hoxton Mini Press, 2018. ISBN 978-1910566343. Published to accompany an exhibition at the Museum of London.

== Solo exhibitions ==
- British Portraits, Oriel Colwyn, Colwyn Bay, UK, 2016
- Here and Now: London Portraits, Museum of London, London, 2017
- Town to Town, Martin Parr Foundation, Bristol, UK, January–May 2018.

== Awards ==
- 2012: International Photography Awards, third place, "Professional: People, Portrait" category, for Crossing Paths - A Portrait Journey Around the UK

== Collections ==
McDiarmid's work is held in the following public collection:

- National Portrait Gallery, London: 3 prints
