= Jon Tonks =

British photographer

Jon Tonks (born 1981) is a British documentary photographer. He was awarded the Royal Photographic Society's Vic Odden Award in 2014 for his book Empire.

== Early life and education ==
Tonks was born in Sutton Coldfield in the West Midlands on july 17th 1981. He studied design then worked as a local newspaper photographer. Later he earned an MA in Photojournalism & Documentary Photography from London College of Communication.

== Life and work ==
Tonks' first book Empire (2014) is about four small far-flung territories that remain under British rule: Tristan da Cunha, Ascension Island, Saint Helena, and the Falkland Islands. Beginning in 2007, Tonks spent five years working on the project and travelled around 50,000 miles; he "spent a month in each territory, and over a month at sea getting to them". Sean O'Hagan, reviewing the book in The Observer, wrote that "Tonk mixes portraiture and documentary to show how important post-colonial tradition is to the survival of these communities and how their adherence to a kind of old-fashioned Britishness can make them seem culturally as well as geographically isolated in our increasingly globalised world." An accompanying text mixes historical fact and anecdote.

== Publications ==
- Empire. Stockport: Dewi Lewis, 2014. Photographs and text. Edition of 1000 copies. ISBN 9781907893490.
  - Second edition. Dewi Lewis, 2014. ISBN 978-1907893490.
- The Men Who Would Be King. Stockport: Dewi Lewis, 2021. With Christopher Lord. ISBN 978-1-911306-43-6.

== Exhibitions ==
=== Solo exhibitions ===
- Empire, Mac, Birmingham, 2014; Ffotogallery, Cardiff, 2015; Impressions Gallery, Bradford, September–December 2015

=== Other exhibitions ===
- Cargo, Format International Photography Festival, Derby, 2017

== Awards ==
- 2014: Vic Odden Award, Royal Photographic Society, Bath, UK
