= Jon Nicholson =

British photographer

- Website: www.jonnicholson.co.uk

Jon Nicholson is a professional photographer.

Nicholson worked closely with Damon Hill, with him producing a book at the end of the 1994 Formula One season. For the 1995 season, Nicholson moved on to focussing on the Williams team as a whole, focussing on both Hill and David Coulthard, as well as team personnel.
