= Kirsty Mackay =

British photographer

- Born: Glasgow, Scotland
- Known for: photography
- Awards: Rebecca Vassie Memorial Award (2017)

Kirsty Mackay is a Scottish documentary photographer living in Bristol. Her first book is My Favourite Colour Was Yellow (2017). In 2017 Mackay won the Rebecca Vassie Memorial Award.

== Life and work ==
Mackay was born in Glasgow. She studied photography at Glasgow College before leaving for New York City and London, to work as a photographer's assistant. She gained an MA in Documentary Photography from the University of Wales, Newport.

Mackay's first photo-book, the self-published My Favourite Colour Was Yellow (2017), documents the bias for the colour pink amongst girls in the UK.

In 2017 Mackay won the Rebecca Vassie Memorial Award, mentoring and a bursary of £1250 to help in making her project The Fish that Never Swam. The award is to help early-career photographers develop their careers. Mackay's project is in response to the Glasgow effect, "the impact housing and overcrowding has on the life expectancy of Glaswegians".

== Publications ==
- My Favourite Colour Was Yellow. Self-published, 2017. With an essay by Jo B. Paoletti, "Generation Pink". Edition of 200 copies. OCLC 1008371099.
- The Fish That Never Swam. Self-published, 2021. With an abridged version of the "History, politics and vulnerability: explaining excess mortality" report by the Glasgow Centre for Population Health. Edition of 500 copies. OCLC 1285666287.
- The Magic Money Tree. London: Bluecoat, 2024. ISBN 9781908457899. With an afterword by Jem Bartholomew.

== Awards ==
- 2017: Rebecca Vassie Memorial Award
