= Ken Grant =

British photographer (born 1967)

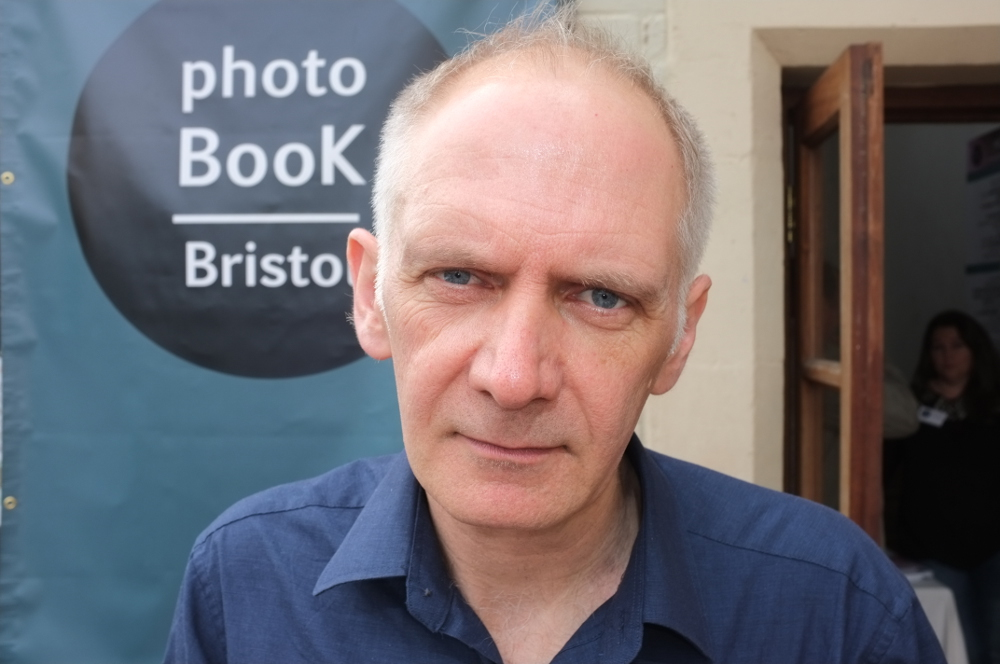
- Grant in 2014
- Born: 1967 (age 58–59); Liverpool, England
- Education: West Surrey College of Art and Design
- Occupation: Photographer
- Website: www.ken-grant.info

Ken Grant (born 1967) is a photographer who since the 1980s has concentrated on working class life in the Liverpool area. He is a lecturer in the MFA photography course at the University of Ulster.

== Life and career ==
Born in Liverpool in 1967, Grant worked as a carpenter in Liverpool after finishing school, even then taking photographs. He later studied at the West Surrey College of Art and Design, studying under Martin Parr and Paul Graham.

According to a publication by American Suburb X, Grant tends to work slowly, returning again and again to the same places and becoming a familiar sight to the people who gather there.

In a 2013 interview with American Suburb X, Grant’s work was described as candid and intimate, depicting subjects who could be seen as casualties of Britain’s social and economic changes during the 1980s and 1990s. Full citation here

The Close Season was published by Dewi Lewis over a decade after Grant had first met Lewis; the photographs in No Pain Whatsoever (whose title derives from a story by Richard Yates) were taken over a span of more than two decades.

Writing in The Observer, Sean O'Hagan has described the No Pain Whatsoever series (Note: The series is reproduced here within Grant's site.) as "from the same great British tradition as the work of Chris Killip and Graham Smith . . . a record of a time when working-class traditions were under threat from Thatcherism." (Note: A link to the article here on Smith is in O'Hagan's article at theguardian.com; a link there to Killip's website is changed here to a link to the article here on Killip.)

Writing in The Independent, Brian Viner said "The photographs . . . show Grant's wonderfully keen eye for the humdrum realities of everyday working-class – or more accurately, unemployed – existence in the 1980s and beyond . . . It is the instinct of the social documentarian, and Grant deserves to rank alongside the better-known Martin Parr as one of the best." Diane Smyth, writing in the British Journal of Photography about Grant's book Flock said "Grant avoids making easy statements in favour of simple observation. Even so, by recording these everyday working lives, he's made a series that matters."

As influences and inspirations, Grant has cited Raymond Carver, Fred Voss, Terence Davies, Christer Strömholm, Bruce Davidson, and Gil Scott-Heron.

Grant was the course leader of the BA (Hons) Documentary Photography course at the University of Wales, Newport between 1998 and 2013, when he became a lecturer in the MFA Photography course at the University of Ulster.

== Collections ==
- Museum Folkwang, Essen.
- Museum of Modern Art, New York.
- Hereford Archive Service, Hereford, England.

== Exhibitions ==
=== Solo exhibitions ===
- The Close Season, The Gallery of Photography, Dublin, 2003.
- No Pain Whatsoever, Déda Gallery, Format International Photography Festival, Derby, 2013.
- Everton Photographs 1985—2000, Liverpool International Photography Festival, Beaconsfield Community Centre, Everton, 2013.
- Ken Grant Photographs: The Stevie Bell Invitation Edit, Liverpool International Photography Festival, Beaconsfield Community Centre, Everton, 2013.
- Flock, Third Floor Gallery, Cardiff, 2014.

=== Joint exhibitions ===
- Nothing is in the Place. Photographs of the 1990s by AVI, Anonymous (Value Action), Donald Christie, Vicki Churchill, Brett Dee, Nigel Dickinson, Chris Dyer, Jason Evans, Anna Fox, Ken Grant, Nick Knight, Mark Lally, Clive Landen, Gordon MacDonald, Martin Parr, Vinca Petersen, Mark Power, Paul Reas, Richard Sawdon-Smith, Helen Sear, Paul Seawright, Nigel Shafran, Wolfgang Tillmans, Nick Waplington, Jack Webb, Tom Wood, and Dan Wootton; curated by Jason Evans. Gallery of Contemporary Art Bunkier Sztuki, Photomonth in Kraków, 2010. Fringe Focus. The Old Co-Op Building, Brighton.
- Wirral Pride of Place Project, Caravan Gallery, New Brighton, 2013. With Tom Wood and Martin Parr.
- Champs-contre-champs: Les Visages de la ruralité, Gwinzegal, France, 2013. With Remy Artiges, Dalila Ingold, Dorothea Lange, Andrew Lichtenstein, Carlos Javier Ortiz, Pierre Pedelmas, Andy Sewell, W. Eugene Smith and Anthony Suau.
- I See Europe: A Visual Journey in Various Chapters, Stuttgart Fotosommer 2013, Kunstbezirk Galerie im Gustav-Siegle-Haus Stuttgart. Works by Arnis Balčus, Katharina Gaenssler, Julian Germain, Ken Grant, Martin Kollar, Geraldine Lay, Eva Leitolf, Frederic Lezmi, Søren Lose, Andreas Meichsner, James Morris, Marcella Müller, Krzysztof Pacholak, Jordis Antonia Schlösser, Volker Schrank, Corinne Silva, Laurenz Theinert, Remigijus Treigys, and Arturas Valiauga.
- Ken Grant / Louis Quail / Kajal Nisha Patel / Moira Lovell, Street Level Photo Works, Glasgow, 2013. Grant showed work from No pain whatsoever.
- Country Matters, James Hyman Gallery, London, September–November 2013. Photographs by Grant, Anna Fox, Bert Hardy, Colin Jones, Roger Mayne, Tony Ray-Jones, Chris Killip, Sirkka-Liisa Konttinen, Martin Parr, Mark Power, and Homer Sykes.

=== Exhibitions at festivals ===
- The Birdhouse, various venues in Hereford, Hereford Photography Festival, England, 2012.

=== Exhibitions as curator ===
- Condition Report: New Photographic Art from the Czech Republic. Ffotogallery (Cardiff) 2010; Hoopers Gallery (London), 2011. Photographs by Kateřina Držková, Jan Měřička, Zdeněk Květoň, Radek Květoň, Vojtěch Fröhlich, and Tereza Příhodová.
- Double Take: Photographs from the Keith Medley Archive, Walker Art Gallery, Liverpool, 2013. Photographs by Keith Medley, curated for an exhibition at the Walker Art Gallery, Liverpool by Grant and Mark Durden.

== Books ==
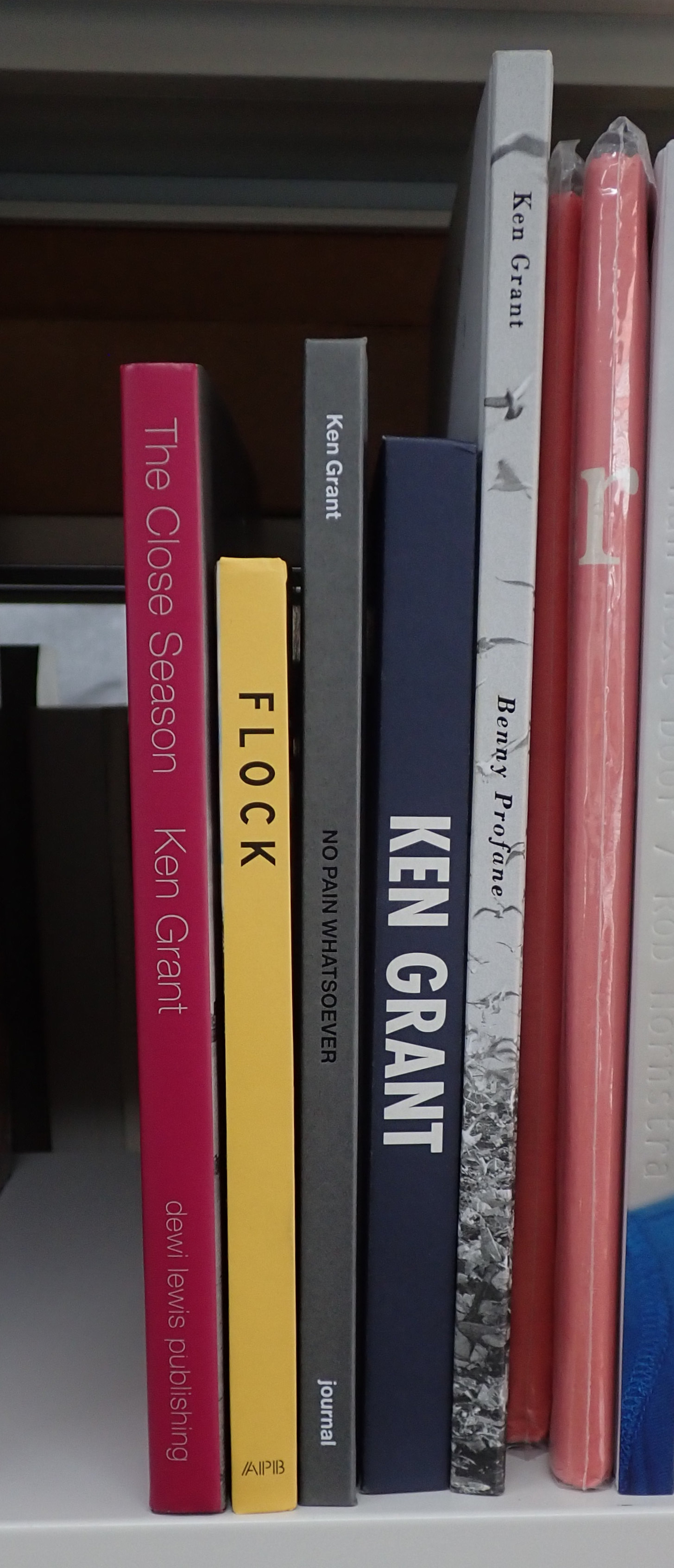
Five photobooks by Ken Grant; from left to right The Close Season, Flock, No Pain Whatsoever, A Topical Times for These Times, Benny Profane

=== Photobooks by Grant ===
- The Close Season. Stockport: Dewi Lewis, 2002. ISBN 1-899235-04-3. With a story by James Kelman ("It's the ins and the outs", from The Burn). (Note: Dewi Lewis's page about The Close Season is here.)
- The Birdhouse. Commissioned by the Elmley Foundation and in association with the Edgar Street Grid partnership, 2013. Edition of 500. Large magazine format. Looks at the people and the birds who inhabit a poultry market in Hereford. (Note: The series is reproduced here within Grant's site.)
- Shankly One. Southport: Café Royal, 2013. Edition of 200. Later reprinted. (Note: Café Royal Books' page about Shankly One is here.)
- Shankly Two. Southport: Café Royal, 2013. Edition of 200. Later reprinted. (Note: Café Royal Books' page about Shankly Two is here.)
- One Day in July near Cable Street Southport. Southport: Café Royal, 2013. Edition of 200. Later reprinted. (Note: Café Royal Books' page about One Day in July near Cable Street Southport is here.)
- From the Provy to the Derry. Southport: Café Royal, 2013. Edition of 200. Later reprinted. (Note: Café Royal Books' page about From the Provy to the Derry is here.)
- No Pain Whatsoever. Stockholm: Journal, 2014. ISBN 9789198125351. Edition of 1000.
- Flock. Dublin: Artist Photo Books, 2014. ISBN 978-0-9927485-2-4. Edition of 750. (Note: APB's page about Flock, as archived by the Wayback Machine on 8 April 2016, is here.)
- A Topical Times for These Times: A Book of Liverpool Football. Bristol: RRB, 2016. ISBN 978-0993232381. Edition of 1000 copies. With an essay by Niall Griffiths and a short text by Grant. (Note: For samples, see "When Saturday came: The city of Liverpool captured through its love of football – in pictures", The Guardian, 22 August 2016.) (Note: RRB's sales page for A Topical Times for These Times is here.)
- Benny Profane. Bristol: RRB, 2019. ISBN 978-1-9997275-7-4. Edition of 500 copies. (Note: RRB's page about Benny Profane is here.)

=== Other publications ===
- Condition Report: New Photographic Art from the Czech Republic. Cardiff: Ffotogallery, 2010. ISBN 1872771823. Includes interviews by Grant, Helen Sear, and Ian Walker.
- From Talbot to Fox. 150 Years of British Social Photography. London: James Hyman, 2012. Edition of 50. An overview of British social photography published to accompany an exhibition by James Hyman Photography at The AIPAD Photography Show New York in 2011. Includes photographs by William Henry Fox Talbot, David Octavius Hill & Robert Adamson, Roger Fenton, Horatio Ross, Julia Margaret Cameron, Thomas Annan, Bill Brandt, Bert Hardy, Roger Mayne, Cecil Beaton, Caroline Coon, Paul Reas, Jem Southam, Ken Grant, Karen Knorr, Anna Fox and others.
- Double Take: Portraits from the Keith Medley Archive. Liverpool: Liverpool John Moores University Archives, 2013. ISBN 978-0-9576173-0-8. Edition of 500.
- European Prospects: Visual Explorations in an Undiscovered Continent. Cardiff: Ffotogallery, 2013. ISBN 978-1-872771-99-1.
