= Tom Stoddart =

British photojournalist (1953–2021)

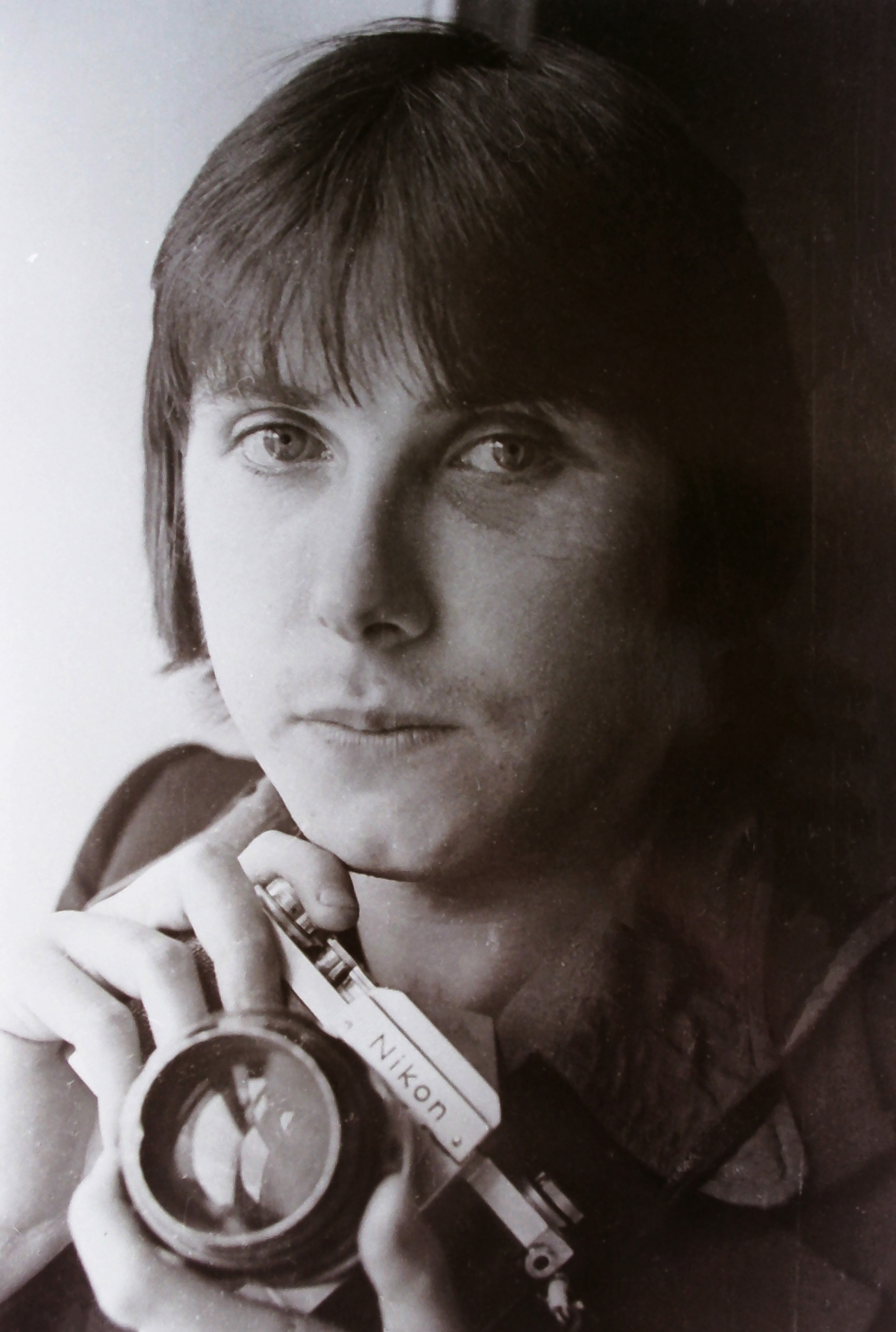
- Stoddart in 1979
- Born: 28 November 1953; Morpeth, Northumberland
- Died: 17 November 2021 (aged 67)
- Occupation: Photojournalist
- Website: tomstoddart.com

Thomas Stoddart (28 November 1953 – 17 November 2021) was a British photojournalist. He covered the fall of the Berlin Wall, the Lebanese Civil War, the siege of Sarajevo and the 2003 invasion of Iraq.

== Life and career ==
Stoddart was born in Morpeth, Northumberland in November 1953. He began his career covering local news for the Berwick Advertiser, Northumberland and John Pick's Yorkshire Press agency, York. He continued his work as a photojournalist based in London and from there covered national and international stories including the fall of the Berlin Wall, the Lebanese Civil War, the siege of Sarajevo and the 2003 invasion of Iraq.

Stoddart died from cancer on 17 November 2021, at the age of 67.

== Publications ==
- Sarajevo. Washington: Smithsonian, 1998. ISBN 9781560987963. With an essay by Predrag Matvejevic.
- IWitness. London: Trolley, 2004. ISBN 9781904563297.
- Extraordinary Women: Images of Courage, Endurance & Defiance . Woodbridge, Suffolk: ACC Art, 2020. ISBN 978-1788840989. With a foreword by Angelina Jolie.

== Awards ==
- 2003: Winner, Pictures of the Year International World Understanding Award, for work on HIV/AIDS in sub-Saharan Africa
- 2003: Winner, Larry Burrows Award for Exceptional War Photography, for coverage of British forces fighting in Iraq
- 2008: Shortlisted, Taylor Wessing Photographic Portrait Prize, for "Murdoch Reflects"

== Exhibitions ==
=== Solo exhibitions ===
- Tom Stoddart – Extraordinary Women, Side Gallery, Newcastle, 2020/21

=== Exhibitions with one other ===
- Edge of Madness – Sarajevo a City and Its People Under Siege, Royal Festival Hall, London, 1997. Work by Stoddart and Alastair Thain.
