= Martin Harrison (art historian) =

British writer about art and photography

- Born: 1945 (age 80–81); Coventry, Warwickshire, England
- Occupations: art historian, curator, editor
- Years active: 1973–present
- Notable work: Burne-Jones (1973); Victorian Stained Glass (1980); Young Meteors: British Photojournalism, 1957–1965 (1998); Transition: the London art scene in the fifties (2002); Francis Bacon: Catalogue Raisonné (2016)

Martin Harrison (born 1945) is a British art historian, author and curator, noted for his work on photography, on the medium of stained glass and its history, and as an authority on the work of the painter Francis Bacon.

== Career ==
In the 1960s, Harrison worked as a photographer's assistant at Vogue. Harrison was a founding trustee of the English Stained Glass Museum, located at Ely Cathedral, and curator of its collection from 1975 to 1980. He has curated exhibitions at the Victoria and Albert Museum and National Portrait Gallery in London, and others in Italy, the United States, Mexico, and Germany, where he co-curated a Bacon exhibition in 2006 at the Kunstsammlung Nordrhein-Westfalen in Düsseldorf. He contributed an essay to the catalogue of the Bacon centennial retrospective exhibition shown in 2008–2009 at Tate Britain, the Prado in Madrid and the Metropolitan Museum of Art in New York.

=== Photography ===
Harrison's 1998 book Young Meteors: British Photojournalism, 1957–1965 is a broad survey, also discussing fashion photography; its title is a reference to Jonathan Aitken's 1967 book The Young Meteors, and popularized the term, now commonly applied to that group of photographers.

Harrison encouraged Lillian Bassman to republish her fashion photography years after she had given up in disgust. He also edited Early Color, a collection of the photography of Saul Leiter, and prepared the work of Ron Traeger for exhibition.

=== Francis Bacon studies ===
Harrison is one of the foremost authorities on the work of painter Francis Bacon, and played an instrumental role in the development of the field of Francis Bacon studies, having produced the catalogue raisonné of Bacon's works. Harrison has authored several books about the British artist's work, and on Bacon’s life and his milieu, beginning with Points of Reference in 1999. In 2016, following ten years of research, Harrison completed the catalogue raisonneé of Bacon’s paintings, published in five volumes by The Estate of Francis Bacon. Harrison has edited and curated several volumes of essays and criticism on Bacon, and since 2019 has been editor of the Francis Bacon Studies series, established that year with the release of Bacon and the Mind: Art, Neuroscience and Psychology, and Francis Bacon: Painting, Philosophy, Psychoanalysis, published by the Estate in association with Thames & Hudson.

Harrison's writings on Bacon emphasize the importance to the artist's work of cinema and the photographs, often torn from magazines, that Bacon collected and referred to when working. Peter Conrad praised ‘the careful investigation and deft criticism’ of his In Camera: Francis Bacon, concluding that it was "an opulent, paradoxically beautiful book".

== Selected publications ==
- Burne-Jones (1973). New York: Putnam.
- Pre-Raphaelite paintings and graphics (1973). London: Academy Editions.
- Victorian Stained Glass (1980). London: Thames & Hudson.
- Brian Clarke (1981). London: Quartet Books.
- Beauty Photography in Vogue (1987).
- Appearances: fashion photography since 1945 (1991). New York: Rizzoli.
- Young Meteors: British Photojournalism, 1957–1965 (1998).
- Points of Reference (1999).
- David Bailey: birth of the cool, 1957-1969 (1999).
- Transition: the London art scene in the fifties (2002). London : Merrell/Barbican Art.
- In Camera - Francis Bacon: Photography, Film and the Practice of Painting (2005).
- Francis Bacon: Incunabula (2008).
- Francis Bacon: Catalogue Raisonné (2016).
