= Focal Press =

Book publisher

- Parent company: Routledge (Taylor & Francis)
- Founded: 1938; 88 years ago
- Founder: Andor Kraszna-Krausz
- Headquarters location: Waltham, Massachusetts
- Nonfiction topics: film and digital video production, photography, digital imaging, graphics, animation and new media, broadcast and media distribution technologies, music recording and production, mass communications, theatre technology
- Official website: www.focalpress.com

Focal Press is a publisher of creative and applied media books and it is an imprint of Routledge/Taylor & Francis.

== Company history ==
The firm was founded in London in 1938 by Andor Kraszna-Krausz, a Hungarian photographer who migrated to England in 1937 and eventually published more than 1,200 books on photography, cinematography and broadcasting.

It "published practical guides to photography at affordable prices for the general public". One of the books published by Kraszna-Krausz's Focal Press was The All-in-One Camera Book by E. Emanuel and W. D. Dash, which was one of the earliest books on photography written for the general public. First published in 1939, it had gone through 81 editions by 1978.

Book series published by the firm included "Masters of the Camera" and "Classics of Photography".

There was a second firm named Focal Press, which was founded by George Bernhard Eisler in London in 1937 and later opened a branch in New York. It is unclear if there was a connection between the two firms.

Elsevier acquired Kraszna-Krausz's Focal Press in 1983. Focal Press was acquired by Taylor & Francis from Elsevier in July 2012.
