= John Bulmer =

British photographer and filmmaker (born 1938)

John Bulmer (born 28 February 1938) is a photographer, notable for his early use of colour in photojournalism, and a filmmaker.

== Life and career ==
Bulmer was born on 28 February 1938 in Herefordshire, the grandson of the founder of the Bulmer cider company. He started photography when young. Although his earliest interest in it was primarily as a technology (he even built his own enlarger), he was a great admirer of Henri Cartier-Bresson as a teenager.

Bulmer studied engineering at Cambridge, where his interest in photography deepened. While still a student he had photographs published in Varsity as well as a magazine he co-founded, Image; and did photostories for the Daily Express, Queen, and (on night climbing) Life. He also worked as an assistant to Larry Burrows and Burt Glinn. The Life story led to his expulsion from Cambridge six weeks before his finals.

On his expulsion, Bulmer attempted to get a job with the Daily Express; after three days of repeated attempts, the newspaper gave him one. He stayed for two years. After this he worked on assignments for a number of magazines: first in black and white, for Queen, Town, and Time and Tide. His ambition then was photography as journalism:

I wasn't interested in art photography, I was interested in photography as journalism, the last thing I wanted to do was put my photographs on the walls of galleries; I wanted them in magazines.

Thanks in part to a wave of creative people from the north of England, the north was at the time enjoying a vogue in the south. Bulmer's first assignment there was in 1960, for Town, to spend three days photographing the fast-declining Lancashire town of Nelson and compare it with the fast-growing Watford. He found the experience eye-opening and enjoyable.

By this time, Bulmer had evolved his own style:

intimate close shots of people on the streets and public places done with a wide-angle lens interspersed with compressed views of architecture, industry and townscape with a longer lens. The long lens was also used to isolate a figure on the streets. (Note: Bulmer liked to work with a 35 mm camera, and his favourite combination of focal lengths was a 28 or a 35 mm lens, plus either a 105 or a 180 mm lens. Bulmer as quoted in Hamilton, "Northern exposures".)

In addition to Cartier-Bresson, Bulmer admired the work in black and white of Bill Brandt, Larry Burrows, William Klein, Mark Kauffman, and particularly Eugene Smith; but he was asked to work in colour for the Sunday Times Colour Section from its launch in 1962. At the time, most photojournalists looked down on colour photography as commercial; and colour film was difficult to work with as it was slower than black and white and had less exposure latitude.

In 1965, Bulmer first photographed the north of England in colour, for the Sunday Times magazine. (Note: Tearsheets for this story, "The North", can be seen here within Bulmer's website. Accessed 10 February 2013.) Colour photography was "a medium in which Bulmer was the British pioneer", far ahead of such photographers as William Eggleston and Martin Parr. Using colour for the north of England was Bulmer's idea, as was the choice of winter or wet weather, when colour film was yet harder to use. (Note: Moreover, the only film whose use was practicable was Ektachrome-X, whose colour balance shifted with time and was unsuitable when the film was either old or very new. Hamilton, "Northern exposures".)

Grant Scott has described the results:

Saturated but muted colours combined with [Bulmer's] compositional talent to create images which are time capsules as contemporary today as they were then.

The priorities of the Sunday Times Magazine changed in the 1970s; its then-new editor Hunter Davies explained them to Bulmer as "crime, middle-class living and fashion". These were of little interest to Bulmer, who left in 1973 after a final story about North Korea. However, he continued photography for other publications, making his last story of the north of England in 1976, for the British edition of Geo.

Bulmer later photographed celebrities.

The editor of Town, David Hughes, introduced Bulmer to his wife, Mai Zetterling, with whom he then occasionally worked as cinematographer. For some time, Bulmer combined photography with work in film, which was refreshingly different and also promised an escape from the increasingly limited interests of the news magazines. His start in television documentary film came suddenly. When he managed to obtain a visa for Burma, the Sunday Times was uninterested in any story there, and so he

went to the BBC and said, "I've never shot a film in my life before, but I've got this visa, will you give me some money?" And they said yes and that's how I came to make my first film.

As well as the BBC, Bulmer also filmed for the Discovery Channel. For the latter, "Bulmer focused on little-known tribal groups, but treated them as human interest stories rather than exercises in the exotic": a perspective that can also be seen in his early photography.

As Bulmer moved away from photography to film, his earlier photographic work was overlooked. Martin Harrison credits a 1983 exhibition at the Photographers' Gallery, British Photography 1955–65: The Master Craftsmen in Print (curated by Sue Davies), with saving the work of Bulmer (as well as Graham Finlayson and others) from obscurity. Most of a 17-page "Colour Section" within Harrison's own 1998 book Young Meteors: British Photojournalism, 1957–1965 is devoted to Bulmer and his colour work of the north of England.

Bulmer's career in film continued to the mid-2000s, when he retired and turned to digitising and cataloguing his earlier photographs.

Bulmer is married to the sculptor Angela Conner. The couple live at Monnington on Wye in a house, Monnington Court, that Bulmer bought in the 1960s and where they breed and train Morgan horses.

== Films and videos photographed, directed, or produced ==
Dir, directed; pho, photographed; pro, produced. (Note: More details, as well as some short excerpts, are available in this page about films on Bulmer's website. Accessed 10 February 2013.)

- The Artist's Horse. 20 minutes, for The South Bank Show, 1978. Dir, pho, pro
- Beehives and Runaway Wives. For the Discovery Channel, 2002. Dir, pho
- Bull Magic. For Under the Sun (BBC) and National Geographic, 1994. Dir, pho, pro
- Dances with Llamas. 50 minutes, for Under the Sun (BBC), 1997. Dir, pho, pro
- Empty Quarter. 50 minutes, for Journeys (BBC), 1996. Dir, pho
- Fat Fiancees. For the Discovery Channel, 2005. Dir, pho
- Finite Oceans. 1995.
- House of the Spirits. For the Discovery Channel. Dir, pho
- How Does It Feel?. Pictures that Move, 1976. Pho
- Månen är en grön ost. 72 minutes, Stiftelsen Svenska Filminstitutet, 1977. Pho
- Mud and Water Man. For the BBC, 1973. Pho
- A Mysterious Death. 49 minutes, for the BBC, 1999. Dir, pho
- Now Is the Hour. 1970. Dir
- The Painter and the Fighter. For Survival (Anglia), 1996. Dir, pho
- Queen of the Elephants. 90 minutes, for the Discovery Channel, 1994. Pho
- The Search for Shangri-La. 50 minutes, for the BBC and PBS. Dir, pho
- Stick Fights and Lip Plates. 50 minutes, for the Discovery Channel. Dir, pho
- Sunday Pursuit (or Love at First Sight). 25 minutes, 1990. Pho
- The Tide of War. 50 minutes, for National Geographic, 1991. Pho
- Up North. 1970. Dir
- Vincent the Dutchman. 50/52/60 minutes, (Note: The sources cited here disagree on the exact length.) for Omnibus, 1972. (Winner of a BAFTA award for "Television: Specialised Programme" in 1973.)
- The Witchdoctor's New Bride. 50 minutes, for the Discovery Channel, 2005. Dir, pho
- Women of the Yellow Earth. 50 minutes, 1994. Dir, pho

== Exhibitions ==
=== Solo exhibitions ===
- "Hard Sixties: L'Angleterre post-industrielle / Post-Industrial Britain". Galerie David Guirand (Paris), October–December 2008.
- "John Bulmer Retrospective". Hereford Museum and Art Gallery, May–June 2009. Then touring: "John Bulmer, a Retrospective: Photographs from 1959–1979", Lucy Bell Gallery (St Leonards-on-Sea, East Sussex), June–July 2010.
- "Northern Soul". National Coal Mining Museum for England (Overton, West Yorkshire), January–April 2010. Touring: West Gallery, Woodhorn Museum (Ashington, Northumberland), December 2010 – March 2011. Leeds College of Art, Leeds, April–May 2012. Locomotion (National Railway Museum, Shildon, County Durham), September–November 2012. Museum of Cannock Chase (Hednesford, Staffordshire), January–March 2013.
- "John Bulmer: A Retrospective, Photographs from 1959–79". Hotshoe Gallery (London), April–May 2010.
- "The North". Third Floor Gallery (Cardiff), May–June 2011.
- "Out of England: Images from Overseas". Art360 Gallery (Hereford), October–November 2011.
- "Orkney in Colour", Pier Arts Centre (Stromness), June–July 2011.
- "Britain's Hard 60s: John Bulmer's Colour Photographs of a Changing Britain". Monnow Valley Arts (Walterstone, Herefordshire). April–June 2012.

=== Group exhibitions ===
- "British Photography 1955–65: The Master Craftsmen in Print", Photographers' Gallery (London), 1983.
- "The Young Meteors: British Photojournalism 1957–1965." National Museum of Photography, Film and Television (Bradford), July–November 1998; Focus Gallery (London), 1999.
- "Saturday Night and Sunday Morning: The Authentic Moment in British Photography", Djanogly Art Gallery, Lakeside Arts Centre, University of Nottingham, November 2012 – February 2013.

== Books ==
=== Books devoted to Bulmer's photographs ===
- Northern Soul: John Bulmer's Images of Life and Times in the 1960s. Overton: National Coal Mining Museum for England, 2010. National Coal Mining Museum for England publications, 10. ISBN 1872925154. The catalogue for an exhibition at the National Coal Mining Museum for England.
- The North. Liverpool: Bluecoat Press, 2012. ISBN 9781908457080. (Note: Bluecoat's page about The North.)
- Wind of Change. Liverpool: Bluecoat Press, 2014. ISBN 978-1908457226. (Note: Bluecoat's page about Wind of Change.)
- A Very English Village. Liverpool: Bluecoat Press, 2021. With text by Martin Page. ISBN 9781908457639. (Note: Bluecoat's page about A Very English Village.)

=== Zines devoted to Bulmer's photographs ===
- Hartlepool 1960s. Southport: Café Royal, 2017. Edition of 200 copies. Second edition, 2020. (Note: Café Royal Books' page about Hartlepool 1960s and Manchester 1970s.)
- Manchester 1970s. Southport: Café Royal, 2017. Edition of 200 copies. Second edition, 2020.

=== Other books with Bulmer's photographs ===
- The White Tribes of Africa. London: Cape, 1965. New York: Macmillan, 1965. Photographs by Bulmer, text by Richard West.
- The Gringo in Latin America. London: Cape, 1967. Photographs by Bulmer, text by Richard West.
- Martin Harrison. Young Meteors: British Photojournalism, 1957–1965. London: Jonathan Cape, 1998. ISBN 0-224-05129-6. The catalogue for an exhibition at the National Museum of Photography, Film and Television (Bradford). pp. 80–93 are devoted to Bulmer.
