= Homer Sykes =

British photographer (born 1949)

Homer Warwick Sykes (born January 1949) is a Canadian-born British documentary photographer whose career has included personal projects and landscape photography.

== Early life and education ==
Sykes's father, also named Homer Warwick Sykes, was a Canadian-born American of English extraction who worked for the China National Aviation Corporation in Shanghai; his mother, Helen Grimmitt, was born in Hong Kong but her family emigrated to Canada in the early 1930s. The couple were married in Shanghai in August 1947; but in June 1948, at an early stage of his wife's pregnancy, Homer was killed in an accident at Lunghua airfield. In September 1948, Helen returned from Shanghai to her family home in Vancouver, where her son was born in January 1949.

Helen and her infant son Homer travelled to Liverpool on the SS Empress of Canada, arriving in September 1950. She remarried shortly thereafter. The family settled in Birmingham; like his father, Homer's step-father was a keen photographer. Homer too was a keen photographer as a teenager, creating a darkroom at Sidcot, his boarding school, that he would take home during vacations.

In 1968 Sykes started a three-year course at the London College of Printing (LCP), while sharing a house in St John's Wood. In the summer vacation during his first year, he went to New York, and was impressed by the work of current photographers – Cartier-Bresson, Davidson, Friedlander, Frank, Uzzle and Winogrand – that he saw at the Museum of Modern Art.

== Life and career ==
While wondering about a new photographic project, Sykes serendipitously came across a story on the Britannia Coconut Dancers in an issue of In Britain magazine. This led him to research other local festivals in Britain at the archives of Cecil Sharp House. Sykes' photography of these festivals was inspired by that of Benjamin Stone, but he approached them with a modern sensibility and a small-format camera, "[trying] to include the unintended participants and to document the unfolding drama in a contemporary urban environment". After viewing a touring exhibition of Stone and Sykes' photography of "festivals, customs and pageants", Colin MacInnes wrote that:

Although these photographs do great credit to Sykes both as a photographer and as a social investigator, it should not be thought that his interests lie exclusively in the direction of barrel parades, beating the bounds, or the Queensferry burryman (who saunters around the boozers looking like a floral dalek on appropriate occasions). For . . . [Sykes'] chief interest is in a more varied photography. . . . At [giving us a heightened image of reality], Homer Sykes is very good indeed. . . . [When photographing a pageant], he seems to have caught the performers rather off their guard – not so much when doing this traditional thing, as having done it, or being about to do it.

The photographs also appeared in Once a Year: Some Traditional British Customs, a book (published by Gordon Fraser, uniform with Patrick Ward's Wish You Were Here) in which Sykes presents one or more photographs of and a detailed explanatory text for each of 81 customs—for example, three photographs (on pp. 105–108) of the annual auction on the first Monday following St Peter's Day (29 June) at the Grapes Inn of the mowing and grazing rights to Yarnton Meadow (or Yarnton West Mead), Yarnton (Oxfordshire). Once a Year has been described as "a beautifully photographed, tender and often humorous document"; and, 32 years after its publication, as remaining "[p]robably the best study of English folklore and ritual".

But Sykes's interests went far beyond annual customs. Annie-Laure Wanaverbecq of Maison de la photographie Robert Doisneau writes that "Observing his countrymen with humour and curiosity, over several years [Sykes] produced a fabulous visual archive of a nation in crisis and beset by doubt." This included the glam rock, punk, new wave and other music/fashion scenes of Britain.

Michaël Houlette of Maison de la photographie Robert Doisneau writes:

The combination of several people in the same frame characterizes most of the photographs by Homer Sykes selected for [an exhibition of his work of the 1970s]. Often the structure of his images rests on two or three main figures who stand out and reveal themselves by an expression or attitude. There is no overly obvious direction or composition, just a keen observation and a systematic method of shooting: a short focal length, some preliminary observation and a certain English manner, frank and courteous, to come in contact with people that he sometimes photographs at very close range (surprisingly, they also seem to ignore the photographer who is at work). Present at the event, invisible in the image, Homer Sykes made discretion a real trademark. And if it's evidence of knowing how to see, it's the relinquishment of the frame to those he photographs: "My pictures are about people, what they wear, how they look, how they interact with each other, against a background that sets the scene. They are not about me".

After absorbing advice from David Hurn, then a part-time lecturer at LCP who was living nearby, as well as other photographers that he met through Hurn, Sykes moved on to photographing news stories for the Weekend Telegraph, Observer, Sunday Times, Newsweek, Now, Time, and New Society. He worked with various agencies including Viva, and from 1989 to 2005 was with Network Photographers.

Sykes photographed the British landscape, as well as pubs, prehistoric remains and other scenes in Britain, for various books published by Weidenfeld & Nicolson. He also found time for his own projects: Hunting with Hounds, "a closely observed documentation of another set of rituals that define a dimension of the English way of life", and On the Road Again, photographs of four North American road trips taken over three decades.

When the Grimstone Foundation invited Sykes to photograph Shanghai, the city of his conception, he jumped at the opportunity. A high point for him was his discovery that the building on Jiang Xi Lu where his parents lived still existed, as the Fu Zhou building. Sykes's collection was exhibited and published as Shanghai Odyssey.

Sykes has taught in the master's course in Photojournalism and Documentary Photography at the London College of Communication.

In 2014, Maison de la photographie Robert Doisneau (Gentilly, Paris) held a major exhibition of Sykes' work from the 1970s.

== Exhibitions ==
=== Solo exhibitions ===
- "Traditional British Calendar Customs", Arnolfini Gallery (Bristol), 1977; Side Gallery (Newcastle), 31 August – 25 September 1977.
- "Shanghai Odyssey", Open Eye Gallery (Liverpool), 24 May – 20 June 2003. Festival of Photography and Contemporary Art (Biella), 2005.
- "On the Road Again", Hereford Town Hall (Hereford Photography Festival), 2002.
- "Green Man and Friends, photographs from the 1970s", WPS (Hastings), 2009.
- "England 1970–1980", Maison de la photographie Robert Doisneau (Gentilly, Paris), 27 June – 12 October 2014.
- "My Britain 1970–1980", Les Douches la Galerie, Paris. 5 September – 31 October 2015.
- "Once a Year – Homer Sykes", Lucy Bell Gallery, St Leonards-on-Sea, May–June 2021

=== Other exhibitions ===
- "Personal Views 1850–1970", British Council touring exhibition, 1970.
- "Traditional Country Customs" (with work by Benjamin Stone), ICA (London), 1971.
- "Young British Photographers", Museum of Modern Art (Oxford), 1971.
- Exhibition of photographs by Stone and Sykes of festivals, customs and pageants, Southampton and Birmingham, 1973.
- "Reportage Fotografen", Museum des 20. Jahrhunderts (Vienna), 1978.
- "Il Regno Unito si diverte". British Council, Milan, 1981. With Chris Steele-Perkins and Patrick Ward.
- "The Other Britain", National Theatre (London), and touring in Britain, 1982.
- "A British Eye on the World", Museum of Modern Art (Rio de Janeiro), 1986.
- "Viva, une agence photographique", Jeu de Paume (Paris), 2007.
- "How We Are: Photographing Britain." Tate Britain (London), 2007.
- "No Such Thing as Society: Photography in Britain 1968–1987", Aberystwyth Arts Centre; Tullie House (Carlisle); Ujazdów Castle (Warsaw).
- "Unpopular culture." De La Warr Pavilion (Bexhill), 2008.
- "The Other Britain Revisited: Photographs from New Society", Victoria and Albert Museum, 2010.
- "Goodbye London: Radical art and politics in the seventies", Neue Gesellschaft für Bildende Kunst (Berlin), 26 June – 15 August 2010. With Stuart Brisley, Victor Burgin, David Hall, Margaret Harrison, Derek Jarman, Peter Kennard, Jo Spence, and John Savage.
- "Mass Photography: Blackpool through the Camera", Grundy Art Gallery (Blackpool), 6 August – 5 November 2011.
- "A Record of England." MAC (Birmingham), 2011. With Daniel Meadows.
- "Photo 50: A Cyclical Poem". Business Design Center (London), 2013. With Dorothy Bohm, Markéta Luskačová, Sirkka-Liisa Konttinen, Brian Griffin, Chris Steele-Perkins, Ian Beesley and Paul Hill.
- "Country Matters". James Hyman Gallery (London), 11 September – 7 November 2013. With Bert Hardy, Roger Mayne, Tony Ray-Jones, Colin Jones, Chris Killip, Sirkka-Liisa Konttinen, Martin Parr, Mark Power, Anna Fox, Ken Grant.
- "Picturing Derry". 2013 Derry~Londonderry City of Culture. The City Factory (Derry), 31 May – 7 July 2013. With Gilles Caron, Brian Gill, Clive Limpkin, Willie Carson, Larry Doherty, Barney McMonagle, A. W. Martin, Eamon Melaugh, Seán Hillen, Willie Doherty and Victor Sloan.
- "The Male Gaze". James Hyman Gallery (London), 21 May – 7 July 2014. With Bill Brandt, Jacob Epstein, Lucian Freud, Henry Moore, Matthew Smith, Walter Sickert and Keith Vaughan.

== Permanent collections ==
- Birmingham Central Library
- British Council
- British Government Art Collection
- Victoria and Albert Museum (London)
- Museum Folkwang (Essen)

== Books ==
- British Image 1: Photographs by Homer Sykes, Claire Schwob, John Myers, Daniel Meadows, Bryn Campbell, Roslyn Banish, Ian Dobbie, and Paul Carter. London: Arts Council of Great Britain, 1975. ISBN 978-0728700352. Sykes' "Calendar Customs" appears on pp. 4–15.
- The Facts about a Pop Group: Featuring Wings. London: Whizzard, Deutsch, 1976. ISBN 0-233-96771-0. Sydney: Angus & Robertson, 1976. ISBN 0-207-13410-3. New York: Harmony, 1977. ISBN 0-517-52983-1. Text by Dave Gelly. About the group Wings.
  - Wie eine Pop-Gruppe arbeitet. Musik erklärt für junge Leser. Hamburg: Tessloff, 1978. ISBN 3-7886-0801-3.
- Once a Year: Some Traditional British Customs. London: Gordon Fraser, 1977. ISBN 0-900406-68-2.
- The English Season. London: Pavilion, 1986. ISBN 1-85145-035-1. Topsfield, Mass.: Salem House, 1987. ISBN 0-88162-236-2. Text by Godfrey Smith. On the social "season".
- The Village Pub. Country Series 26. London: Weidenfeld & Nicolson, 1992. ISBN 0-297-83125-9. London: Weidenfeld & Nicolson, 1996. ISBN 0-297-83561-0. London: Phoenix Illustrated, 1998. ISBN 0-7538-0434-4. Text by Roger Protz.
  - English Village Pubs. New York: Abbeville, 1992. ISBN 1-55859-409-4.
- Mysterious Britain: Fact and Folklore. Country Series 30. London: Weidenfeld & Nicolson, 1993. ISBN 0-297-83196-8. London: Weidenfeld & Nicolson, 1995. ISBN 0-297-83453-3. London: Phoenix Illustrated, 1998. ISBN 0-7538-0432-8. London: Cassell, 2001. ISBN 1-84188-149-X.
- The Great Stones of England. Weidenfeld Country Miniatures. London: Weidenfeld & Nicolson, 1994. ISBN 0-297-83323-5. On megaliths.
- The Storm Is Passing Over: A Look at Black Churches in Britain. London: Thames & Hudson, 1995. ISBN 0-500-27826-1. Text by Roy Kerridge.
- Celtic Britain. Country Series 40. London: Weidenfeld & Nicolson, 1997. ISBN 0-297-82210-1. London: Phoenix Illustrated, 1998. ISBN 0-7538-0128-0. London: Cassell, 2001. ISBN 1-84188-150-3.
- On the Road Again. London: Mansion Editions, 2002. ISBN 0-9542233-0-6.
- Shanghai Odyssey. Stockport: Dewi Lewis, 2002. ISBN 1-899235-14-0. (Note: "Shanghai Odyssey." Dewi Lewis. Accessed 10 June 2022.)
- Hunting with Hounds. London: Mansion Editions, 2004. ISBN 0-9542233-1-4 (hardback). London: Mansion Editions, 2005. ISBN 0-9542233-2-2 (paperback).
- Goodbye to London: Radical Art and Politics in the Seventies, ed. Astrid Proll. Ostfildern: Hatje Cantz, 2010. ISBN 978-3-7757-2739-6. Contains a chapter by Sykes, "Grunwick was different", about the Grunwick dispute.
- This is England. Paris: Poursuite, 2014. ISBN 978-2-918960-77-5. Published to accompany "England 1970–1980" at Maison de la photographie Robert Doisneau. (Note: "This Is England." Poursuite. Archived by the Wayback Machine on 30 September 2020.)
- Once a Year: Some Traditional British Customs. Stockport: Dewi Lewis, 2016. ISBN 978-1-911306-03-0. An augmented edition of the 1977 book. (Note: "Once a Year." Dewi Lewis. Accessed 8 June 2022.)
- Blitz Club Blitz Kids. Paris: Poursuite, 2017. ISBN 978-2-918960-95-9. Photographs of the Blitz Kids. (Note: "Blitz Club Blitz Kids." Poursuite. Accessed 8 June 2022.)
- My British Archive: The Way We Were 1968–1983. Stockport: Dewi Lewis, 2018. ISBN 978-1-911306-40-5. (Note: "My British Archive." Dewi Lewis. Accessed 8 June 2022.)
- Colour Works: The 1980s and 1990s. Stockport: Dewi Lewis, 2021. ISBN 978-1-911306-73-3 (Note: "Colour Works." Dewi Lewis. Accessed 8 June 2022.)
- Before the Blue Wall. [Little Neston, Ches.]: Fistful of Books, 2022. Photographs of the area demolished in order to create the London Olympic Park. (Note: "Before the Blue Wall." Fistful of Books. Accessed 8 June 2022.)

== Zines ==
- Stonehenge: 1970s Counterculture. Southport: Café Royal, 2013. (Note: "Stonehenge: 1970s Counterculture", Café Royal Books. Archived by the Wayback Machine on 26 October 2013.)
- Working Men: Club and Coal. Southport: Café Royal, 2013. (Note: "Working Men: Club and Coal", Café Royal Books. Archived by the Wayback Machine on 26 April 2013.)
- Blitz Kids: Skins and Silver Spoons. Southport: Café Royal, 2013. (Note: "Blitz Kids: Skins and Silver Spoons", Café Royal Books. Archived by the Wayback Machine on 26 August 2013.)
- Once a Year: 1970s Folklore in Britain. Southport: Café Royal, 2013. (Note: "Once a Year: 1970s Folklore in Britain ", Café Royal Books. Accessed 10 September 2015.)
- Toff's Hat Flat Cap. Southport: Café Royal, 2013. (Note: "Toff's Hat Flat Cap", Café Royal Books. Archived by the Wayback Machine on 26 October 2013.)
- Brick Lane and Co: Whitechapel in the 1970s. Southport: Café Royal, 2013. (Note: "Brick Lane and Co: Whitechapel in the 1970s", Café Royal Books. Archived by the Wayback Machine on 26 October 2013.)
- A Tinker's Tale. Southport: Café Royal, 2013. (Note: "A Tinker's Tale", Café Royal Books. Archived by the Wayback Machine on 22 September 2013.)
- Once a Year: Folklore in Britain Now. Southport: Café Royal, 2013. (Note: "Once a Year: Folklore in Britain Now ", Café Royal Books. Accessed 10 September 2015.)
- Saltaire 1981: Still a Model Mill Village. Southport: Café Royal, 2014. On Saltaire, a model village in Bradford. (Note: "Saltaire 1981: Still a Model Mill Village ", Café Royal Books. Accessed 10 September 2015.)
- Mexico 1973: Mazatlan and Heading South. Southport: Café Royal, 2014. (Note: "Mexico 1973: Mazatlan and Heading South ", Café Royal Books. Accessed 10 September 2015.)
- Biddy Boys Ireland 1972. Southport: Café Royal, 2015. (Note: "Biddy Boys Ireland 1972 ", Café Royal Books. Accessed 10 September 2015.)
- Made in Roath. Southport: Café Royal, 2015. Photographs of Made in Roath. (Note: "Made in Roath ", Café Royal Books. Accessed 10 September 2015.)
- Running Riots and the Days After. Southport: Café Royal, 2015. (Note: "Running Riots and the Days After", Café Royal Books. Accessed 10 September 2015.)
- My Britain 1970–1980s. Southport: Café Royal, 2015. To accompany the exhibition "My Britain 1970–1980" at Les Douches la Galerie, Paris. (Note: "My Britain 1970–1980s ", Café Royal Books. Accessed 10 September 2015.)
- Sloanes & Rahs. Southport: Café Royal, 2015. Edition of 150 copies. (Note: "Sloanes & Rahs", Café Royal Books. Accessed 15 October 2015.)
- Sir Freddie Laker Inaugural Skytrain Flight 1977. Southport: Café Royal, 2021. Edited by Craig Atkinson. (Note: "Homer Sykes — Sir Freddie Laker Inaugural Skytrain Flight 1977 ", Café Royal Books. Accessed 3 March 2021.)
