= Aaron Scharf =

American art historian (1922–1993)

- Portrait of Aaron Scharf by unknown photographer from 'Flak' (1996) by Aaron and Marina Scharf, cover design Vanessa Vargo
- Born: 22 September 1922; United States
- Died: 21 January 1993 (aged 70)
- Occupation: Art Historian
- Spouses: Ruth Dunlap Bartlett (m.1950) Marina Betts (c.1960)

Aaron Scharf (22 September 1922 – 21 January 1993) was an American-born British art historian who contributed in particular to the history of photography in which he had developed an interest while studying at the Courtauld Institute. His investigation uncovered links between painting (and other artforms) and photography, and evidence for artists using photography for reference and other purposes, as well as the way photographers with aspirations as artists referred to painting in their work. He thus pioneered a new field of art history when Pop Art and other movements in the 1960s were reincorporating the medium of photography (which developed separately since the 1930s, and which hitherto art historians in general treated separately from painting) and reference to popular photographic images, into mainstream artistic practice. Scharf popularised his study and discoveries with publication of his profusely illustrated hardback Penguin volume 'Art and Photography' (1968) and through his work at the Open University in producing innovative thematic educational videos on the history of photography and its relation to society.

== Early life ==
Scharf was born in America on 22 September 1922 to Irving Scharf and his wife, Jeanette Shack (Shackowitz) a Jewish immigrant from Volochysk. He trained at Hancock College of Aeronautics in Los Angeles County in 1944 as a second lieutenant, where he gained his 'silver wings', qualifying to fly heavy aircraft. While at the College Scharf used his artistic talents to draw cartoons for the cadet publications.

During World War II he flew 46 missions as a bomber navigator and was award an Air Medal in November 1944, and later promoted to captain. His unit citations were awarded as a result of successful bombing missions over Odertal and Vienna, and it was during his last mission to the latter that flak knocked out three of their B-24 engines and his crew made a forced landing in Russia. Scharf was reported as saying that though “not one of our crew was wounded...many a time we were scared half to death. Some of us came back with graying hair.” From there a jeep convoy took them to Hungary, from where the British flew them out and after the German surrender they flew their B-24 home.

In his memoir of the war Flak (1996) published posthumously by Scharf’s widow, Marina, he recounts how he deliberately botched the targeting of Ravenna, Italy in a bombing raid, to avoid destruction of invaluable monuments.

== Post-war ==
After the war he spent some years as a painter and potter in Los Angeles and produced some commercial art illustration. He studied art and anthropology at the University of California where he became engaged to a fellow student Annette Rose in 1946, whom he married on 8 September. After receiving a master's degree in painting, he won critical acclaim for three paintings in a veterans' art award exhibition in 1951 in the art gallery of Santa Monica Library, and also showed lithographs at Kistler Studio In 1950 he married Ruth Dunlap Bartlett (born 18 October 1921, Racine, died 16 January 2009, Highgate). An accomplished actress, Ruth owned and ran The Beachcomber, a small theatre on Muscle Beach in Santa Monica. Helena Stevens was her stage name. She was also a committed communist and became the first to play the part of Mother Courage in an English-language production of the play of the same name by the German communist playwright Bertolt Brecht. Her husband meantime, was refused work or study in American universities, blacklisted because of his own socialism.

== At the Courtauld ==
In 1956, Scharf and wife arrived in the UK as political refugees from McCarthyism, with an invitation, provided by the communist academic (and spy) Anthony Blunt, for Aaron to study at the Courtauld Institute of Art in London providing their ostensible reason for leaving America. He completed his doctoral thesis exploring the relationship between photography and painting there over a period of five years, from 1961 to 1966.

"Only recently serious research into the relationship between photography and art has taken place. Why has it been so long in coming ? “In some respects historical research is analogous with that of science. The bringing to light of factual material and the development of ideas is to a large extent cumulative.[…] But when artists themselves were, from about 1910, beginning to tear down the bastions protecting Art in its ivory tower, questioning the idea of Art with a capital ‘A’, photography was inevitably to assume a new stature both in the eyes of artists and the public, too.."

— Aaron Scharf 1968

It was eventually published with revisions and additions as Art and Photography (Allen Lane, The Penguin Press, 1968) expanded from his Creative Photography (Studio Vista; New York : Van Nostrand Reinhold, London, 1965).

At the time of writing Creative Photography Scharf had attained his first academic post as head of the department of history of art and complimentary studies at Saint Martin's School of Art.

== "Art and Photography" ==
While Australian State Gallery curator of the 1920s Heinrich Schwartz is reported to have pioneered in, and lectured in America (in 1949) on, research into "pre-photographic" paintings of the 1820s and 1830s, made without lensed devices, in which Schwarz discerned "photographic features," Scharf's book revealed hitherto uncredited direct influences of photography on the creation of artistic images in painting. The emphasis is on the photograph as used in the service of painting, or imitating painted images. Scharf does not here give the same emphasis on photography as an artistic medium in itself as much as he did in Creative Photography, though he does recognise the greater acceptance of photography as art in chapters on the mid Twentieth Century.

Art and Photography was widely and favourably reviewed. As early as 1969 Los Angeles Times art critic William Wilson was certain that it would "join standard texts on the subject" and in summary concluded that “Scharf, insists, in scholarly fashion, that photography has created a new situation we cannot call better or worse, only different, challenging. If the book proves anything, it is that art and photography are both art, interdependent, and yet so fundamentally different you can't really mistake one for the other.” It was welcomed in its most extended contemporary review in the Art Journal by Carl Chiarenza; "At long last a scholarly sourcebook has been published which attempts to organize the bewildering mass of documents relating to the interaction of photography and other media since 1839. Dr. Scharf's new book is absolutely indispensable to any research in the field; it will be the standard reference for a long time to come." Marie Czach hailed it as "the definitive work on the subject of Art and Photography", while Ken Marantz declared it "carefully documented, appropriately illustrated, and readable...important, but the conclusion is particularly insightful..." Robert A. Sobieszek considered it "one of the most appealing books in the field to be published in a long while...the sheer ambition of the work's scope covers the subject with a density lacking until now." Earlier, Michael Webb likened the book to "an archaeological dig, laying bare a lost city on the evidence of an incoherent scatter of shards. Patiently the strata are revealed, the evidence accumulated, the fragments re-assembled." In 1981, Peter Galassi, in his own book on the subject wrote that "the most important and influential work on painting and photography is Aaron Scharf's [book]".

Art and Photography appears in David Hockney's painting My Parents, 1977 (Tate, London) in which the painter's father is engrossed in reading the book; this is significant in indicating the connection between the Scharf's discoveries and the later Hockney-Falco thesis.

At the time of publication, Scharf had become head of the History of Art and Complementary Studies Department at St. Martin’s School of Art, London. The couple settled in Hampstead.

Scharf’s peer, and also friend and frequent correspondent, was Van Deren Coke, whose own studies into the links between art and photography were published as The Painter and the Photograph a year earlier than Creative Photography, but without the same circulation and international reception, revised and enlarged from the 1964 catalogue issued under the same title for the exhibition curated by Van Deren Coke which toured the US in 1964 and 1965.

Scharf's articles on photo history were published in the 1968 issues of Creative Camera magazine in his column, and in Album They reflected his eclectic interests in photography's history, including spirit photography and Darwin's use of photography, to discussion of the engravings on the backs of cartes-de-visite. Under the pressure of other work, he asked to be relieved of writing the Creative Camera column and ask that Van Deren Coke continue it, which he did until December 1969.

Aaron Scharf, 1969(?), illustration Laugh for Jam magazine produced at Saint Martins School of Art

During this period, Scharf contributed the entry on Henri Cartier-Bresson in the Encyclopædia Britannica. He had divorced Ruth, who went on to act for television and films, including Highlander (1986), The Lords of Discipline (1983) and The Ted Kennedy Jr. Story (1986). She died on 25 February 2009. He married Marina (née Betts).

Scharf's own art production consisted of montages made from old photographs and/or 19th-century wood engravings, a selection of which were published by Bill Jay in his last issue as editor of Creative Camera. Jay had seen and was intrigued by the artworks each time he picked up Scharf's copy for Album from his residence near the editorial offices and he published them accompanied by the art historian's request that they be printed without a text; "No text this time! Give them no titles. Let them open up those little doors to mystery which Redon talks about."

== Later life ==
In 1969 Aaron Scharf joined The Open University, Milton Keynes, England, moving to Deanshanger 10 miles away. He stayed there, as Professor of Art History writing art history courses and pursuing personal research, until pressured out by other staff in 1982. Also in 1969, he visited the United States to deliver units on Photography in Modern Art and Seminar in Problems in the History of Photography for Stanford University's 1969 Summer School. From August 1972 he was a member of the photography committee of the Arts Council chaired by Barry Lane with Tristram Powell, a BBC producer; Marina Vaizey, Sunday Times art critic; Bill Gaskins, head of the Audio-Visual Department at Sheffield Polytechnic; David Hurn of Magnum, Ron McCormick and Peter Turner, assistant editor of Creative Camera. The BBC’s landmark eight-part series Pioneers of Photography (1975) was fronted by Aaron Scharf and looked at the history and development of photography.

Aaron had become ill and he and Marina moved to a farm at Briston, Melton Constable, Norfolk. In 1983 and semi-retired Scharf taught as a Visiting Lecturer in Photography in the Design Department at Norwich, even when ill and tired.

Friends Chris Mullen and Tim Giles encouraged him to write his autobiography, which he wrote with the assistance of his wife Ruth and was published posthumously as Flak, concentrating on his experiences as an USAF pilot in the Second World War.

He died on 21 January 1993, survived by his wife Marina and son Caleb, an astrophysicist.

== Curatorships ==
- Summer Show 4, Serpentine Gallery, London, 1977, selected by Aaron Scharf, artists include Jane England, Heather Forbes, John Goto, Jim Harold, Paul Joyce, Chris Locke, Peter Mitchell et al.
- 1971 Royal Photographic Society exhibition: Masterpiece: An Exhibition of Photographs from The Collection of the Royal Photographic Society, an Arts Council touring exhibition that opened on 6 November 1971. Scharf also wrote a statement for the catalogue.

== Publications ==
=== Books and book chapters ===
- Scharf, A. (1965). Creative photography. London : Studio Vista; New York : Van Nostrand Reinhold
- Sisley, Alfred & Scharf, Aaron (1966). Sisley. Knowledge Publications, London
- Sisley, Alfred (1966). Alfred Sisley. Purnell, Paulton, Nr. Bristol [Eng.]
- Scharf, A. (1968). Art and photography. London : Allen Lane. 34 editions published between 1963 and 1994 in 3 languages and held by 54 libraries worldwide
- Scharf, Aaron & Open University & BBC-TV (1970). The Image in the cloud. Open University and BBC TV, [Milton Keynes]
- Scharf, Aaron, "The shadowy world of Bill Brandt," introduction to Brandt, Bill & Scharf, Aaron, & Arts Council of Great Britain & Hayward Gallery & Museum of Modern Art (New York, N.Y.) (1970) Bill Brandt : photographs. Arts Council, London.
- Harvie, Christopher & Martin, Graham, (joint comp.) & Scharf, Aaron, (joint comp.) (1970). Industrialisation and culture, 1830-1914. Macmillan, London
- Bayley, Stephen, & Scharf, Aaron, & Open University (1971). Introduction to art. Open University Press, Bletchley
- Scharf, Aaron & Benton, Tim & Scharf, Aaron, & Open University. Arts Foundation Course Team (1971). Introduction to art. Open University Press, Bletchley (Walton Hall, Bletchley, Bucks.)
- Arts Council of Great Britain & Benton, Tim & Scharf, Aaron, & Royal Photographic Society of Great Britain (1971). Masterpiece, treasures from the collection of the Royal Photographic Society : (catalogue of an exhibition) 1971–72. Arts Council of Great Britain, (London)
- Mucha, J., Henderson, M., & Scharf, A., & Mucha, A. M. (1971). Alphonse Mucha: Posters and photographs. London: Academy Ed.
- Scharf, Aaron & Open University. Arts Foundation Course Team (1971). Art and industry. Open University Press, Bletchley (Walton Hall, Bletchley, Bucks.)
- Edwards, Owain & Martin, Graham, & Scharf, Aaron, & Open University. Age of Revolutions Course Team (1972). Romanticism. Open University Press, Bletchley, Eng
- Scharf, Aaron & Scharf, Aaron, & Open University. Age of Revolutions Course Team (1972). Art and politics in France. Open University Press, Bletchley
- Scharf, A., Coe, B., & Turner, A. (1974). Pioneers of photography: Episode 5. London: BBC Education and Training.
- Mucha, J., Henderson, M., & Scharf, A. (1974). Alphonse Mucha. London: Academy Editions.
- Mucha, Alphonse & Mucha, Jiří, & Henderson, Marina & Scharf, Aaron (1974). Alphonse Mucha (Rev. enl. ed). St. Martin's Press, New York
- Benton, Tim & Benton, Charlotte & Scharf, Aaron, & Open University (1975). History of architecture and design 1890-1939. Units 15 and 16, Design 1920s : German design and the Bauhaus 1925-24 : Modernism and the decorative arts, Paris 1910-30. Open University Press, Milton Keynes
- Benton, Tim & Scharf, Aaron, & Benton, Charlotte & Open University (1975). Design 1920s. Open University Press, Milton Keynes
- Scharf, Aaron & Scharf, Aaron, & Open University (1975). The roots of modern art : [and], Charles Baudelaire, vanguard of modernism; [and], Optimism and pessimism in late nineteenth-century literature and art. Open University Press, Milton Keynes [England]
- Benton, Tim & Open University (1975). The new objectivity: prepared for the course team by Tim Benton; with contributions from Charlotte Benton, John Milner and Aaron Scharf. The Open University Press, Milton Keynes
- Scharf, A. (1976). Pioneers of photography: An album of pictures and words. New York: N. Abrams.
- Scharf, A., & Open University. (1976). The emerging of modern art in the early twentieth century. Milton Keynes: Open University Press.
- Scharf, Aaron & Open University (1976). A new beginning : primitivism and science in post-impressionist art; Return to nature. Open University Press, Milton Keynes
- Harvie, C. T., Martin, G., & Scharf, A. (1976). Industrialisation and culture 1830-1914. London: Macmillan for The Open University Press.
- Scharf, Aaron & Scharf, Aaron, & Open University (1976). A new beginning : primitivism and science in post-impressionist art; Return to nature. Open University Press, Milton Keynes
- Scharf, Aaron & Scharf, Aaron, & Open University (1976). The emerging of modern art in the early twentieth century. Open University Press, Milton Keynes [England]
- Scharf, Aaron, & Arts Council of Great Britain & Serpentine Gallery (1977). Summer show 4 : the work of 23 photographers. Arts Council of Great Britain, London
- Scharf, A., & Open University. (1979). The Enlightenment: Unit 7. Milton Keynes: Open University Press.
- Scharf, Aaron & Scharf, Aaron, & Open University (1979). William Hogarth. Open University Press, Milton Keynes [Buckinghamshire]
- Hill, Paul, with a foreword by Aaron Scharf (1982). Approaching photography. London; Boston : Focal Press.
- Enyeart, James & Monroe, Robert D & Stokes, Philip, with a foreword by Aaron Scharf (1982). Three classic American photographs : texts and contexts. University of Exeter, American Arts Documentation Centre, [Exeter, England]
- Blake, Nigel & Harrison, Charles, & Norman, Di, & Open University, with additional material supplied by Francis Frascina, Aaron Scharf and Belinda Thompson. (1983). Impressionism and Degas. Open University Press, Milton Keynes
- Ascolini, Vasco & Istituto di cultura Casa G. Cini, prefazione di Aaron Scharf. (1989). Vasco Ascolini : le fotografie per il teatro. Analisi, Bologna
- Scharf, A. (1994). Arte y fotografía. Madrid: Alianza Editorial.
- Stangos, Nikos, Scharf Aaron (sections on Suprematism and Constructivism) (1994). Concepts of modern art : from fauvism to postmodernism (3rd ed., expanded and updated). Thames & Hudson, New York, N.Y
- Scharf, A. (1996). FLAK. Briston: Marina Scharf.

=== Media ===
- Harvie, Christopher T & Scharf, Aaron. Whistler-Ruskin trial [sound recording] (1971). Industrialization and culture. Open University, Milton Keynes
- Scharf, Aaron & Coe, Brian & Turner, Ann & Grenfell, Joyce & British Broadcasting Corporation (1974). Pioneers of photography Episode 4, Famous men and fair women [video recording]. BBC Education and Training, London
- Scharf, Aaron & Coe, Brian & Turner, Ann & British Broadcasting Corporation (1974). Pioneers of photography Episode 7, The fleeting image [video recording]. BBC Education and Training, London
- Scharf, Aaron & Coe, Brian & Turner, Ann (1974). Pioneers of photography Episode 8, Colour and the camera [video recording]. BBC Education and Training, London

=== Journal articles ===
- Scharf, Aaron (1989) 'Modernism; Photography; Art', History of Photography, 13:1, 95–102
- Scharf, Aaron (1977) 'One man's fiche ....', History of Photography, 1:4, 352–353. Review of British Masters of the Albumen Print, by Robert A. Sobieszek. International Museum of Photography at George Eastman House. University of Chicago Press (1976)
- Scharf, Aaron (1976). 'Marey and Chronophotography' Artforum, Vol. 15, No. 1 (September 1976)
- Scharf, Aaron (1963) 'The Art of Photography'. Review of Creative Photography. Aesthetic Trends 1839-1960 by Helmut Gernsheim. The Burlington Magazine, Vol. 105, No. 722 (May 1963), pp. 217–218
- Scharf, Aaron (1962). 'Painting, Photography, and the Image of Movement'. The Burlington Magazine, Vol. 104, No. 710 (May 1962), pp. 186+188-195
- Homer, W., & Scharf, A. (1962). Concerning Muybridge, Marey, and Seurat. The Burlington Magazine, 104(714), 391–393. Retrieved from http://www.jstor.org/stable/873738
- Scharf, Aaron (1961). 'Daumier the Painter'. The Burlington Magazine, Vol. 103, No. 701 (Aug. 1961), pp. 356–357+359
