= Daniel Meadows =

British photographer, video-maker and teacher

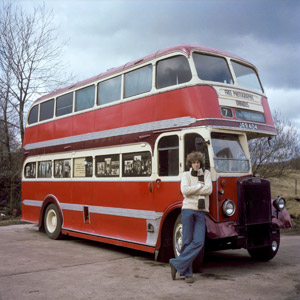
Daniel Meadows and the Free Photographic Omnibus, December 1974. Self-portrait photographed using a tripod and timer.

Daniel Meadows (born 1952) is an English photographer turned maker of digital stories, and a teacher of photography turned teacher of participatory media.

== Life and career as photographer ==
Meadows was born in Great Washbourne, Gloucestershire, "in the middle of nowhere on the edge of the Cotswolds", on 28 January 1952. Both of his parents had Suffolk origins; his father was a land agent for the Dumbleton Estate, in which the family lived; his mother developed multiple sclerosis when Daniel was young and this gradually became more acute. He spent his early years without television.

With Peter Fraser, Brian Griffin, Charlie Meecham and Martin Parr, Meadows studied at Manchester Polytechnic. (Meadows' 1972 series June Street was a collaboration with Parr.) While a student he was particularly inspired by a lecture by Bill Jay (editor of Creative Camera and Album), and an exhibition at the Hayward Gallery of work by Bill Brandt.

Meadows was living in the Moss Side area of Manchester during termtime, and was aware of its impending demolition. With its many small shops, Moss Side might, he thought, support a "picture shop", so he rented a barber's on Greame Street from January 1972, inviting people to come into the Free Photographic Shop to have their photographs taken for no charge. Two months later he had run out of money and had to close but had gained useful experience.

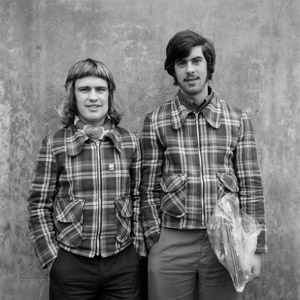
Double portrait from Barrow-in-Furness taken in October 1974 by Daniel Meadows. One of a series of portraits (sometimes referred to as National Portraits) which Meadows made from the Free Photographic Omnibus. The man on the left has been identified as James (or Jimmy) Connor (or O'Connor). On the right is David Balderstone. This picture appears on the front cover of the book Daniel Meadows: Edited Photographs from the 70s and 80s by Val Williams.

Inspired by what Bill Jay had said about Benjamin Stone's travel around Britain by horse-drawn caravan, Meadows thought of a mobile version of the Greame Street studio; the Cliff Richard film Summer Holiday suggested a solution. He worked at Butlin's Holiday Camp at Filey during summer 1972 to pay for the publicity materials with which he hoped to get Arts Council and other funding for the purchase and one year's use of a double-decker bus. He succeeded and for 14 months from September 1973 travelled around England in the Free Photographic Omnibus, a 1947 Leyland PD1 bus whose seats had been removed to make space for a darkroom and living quarters: its windows were used as the gallery. (Note: The bus survives, in the possession of The Transport Museum, Wythall. In April 2014 it was described as "being renovated and restored" ("Daniel Meadows: Early Photographic Works ", Royal Photographic Society). The Transport Museum has shown the bus ("From Our Collection: Barton JRR 404", as retrieved by the Wayback Machine on 25 February 2015), describing it as built in 1948.) Meadows took this to twenty or more towns. Some of this work was published in Meadows' first book, Living Like This (1975), which combined Meadows' photographs and text with first-person accounts of those he had talked with.

Among the photographs of this series is Portsmouth: John Payne, aged 12, with two friends and his pigeon, Chequer, 26 April 1974. (Note: The title has been given in various forms; this is how it appears on the copyright page and p.32 of No Such Thing as Society (2007).) Payne, holding his pigeon in the centre of the photograph, told Meadows that he caught and bred pigeons. Paul Cabuts writes that:

The photograph, like many other photographs in the exhibition [No Such Thing as Society], offers a window on a lost world, one that is difficult to perceive without considerable culturally-specific contextualisation. Meadows' photograph is however a masterstroke in providing clues about the life and times of those recorded through his lens. The boys became the subject, although the pigeon had been the vehicle for this particular engagement. In offering up their pigeon (the photograph was taken at their request), we enter a world of friendship and pride, the social activities on a working class housing estate. . . .

With its echo of Ken Loach's film Kes, the photograph was widely reproduced. It was the cover photograph of the 1975 Arts Council anthology British Image 1 and the photograph on the poster for and catalogue of the 2008 travelling Hayward exhibition No Such Thing as Society.

In 1979 Meadows presented an episode of the Granada TV arts series Celebration that focussed on photographers Charlie Meecham and Chris Killip. Meadows went on to photograph the northwest of England in the 1970s, including the people around Factory Records, and in the 1980s he went on to study the residents of a middle-class London suburb (Bromley, although not specified at the time), the latter published as Nattering in Paradise.

== Career as teacher and digital storyteller ==
Meadows became interested in teaching while photographing in Lancashire in the 1970s; in 1983 David Hurn invited him to help teach the Documentary Photography course at Newport College of Art and Design. From 1994 he has taught at Cardiff School of Journalism, Media and Cultural Studies. His students there have included Tim Hetherington. In the 1990s, he led photojournalism workshops for the Reuters Foundation, the British Council, and other organisations in Europe and the Indian subcontinent.

Meadows' interest in participatory media was greatly influenced by Ivan Illich's ideas as presented in Tools for Conviviality; and his interest in digital storytelling influenced by, successively, Pedro Meyer's I Photograph to Remember, Meyer's ZoneZero website, and the NextExit website of Dana Atchley of the Center for Digital Storytelling (CDS) at UCB. Meadows taught an undergraduate course titled "Digital Storytelling and Photography" and also contemplated ways of adding digital storytelling to the website he was building about the Free Photographic Omnibus and the later lives of the people this had depicted. Meadows corresponded with Dana Atchley and arranged to attend one of the "boot camps" held by Atchley, Joe Lambert and Nina Mullen. Atchley was too ill to appear, but at the camp and a subsequent event at Ben Lomond he learned and exchanged ideas.

From 2001 to 2006 Meadows was creative director of Capture Wales, a BBC Wales project: "[he] accomplished an innovative reworking of the Californian [CDS] model, adapting it to the 'media ecology' of UK public broadcasting".

Since this time Meadows has also lectured widely about digital storytelling.

== Photographic archive ==
In August 2014, Meadows' photographic archive was described as being in the process of acquisition by the Library of Birmingham: "Meadows established a relationship with a collecting institution with specialist expertise and resources", receiving much help from Pete James, the library's Curator of Photography Collections, and Val Williams. With a drastic cut of funds to the Library of Birmingham, its ability to continue to archive the work seemed doubtful. (Note: In a note within his page "The Archive", Meadows points the reader to a December 2014 article by Francis Hodgson, "Another one bites the dust", which describes the importance to British photographic history of the Library and the gravity of the Library's situation.)

The Bodleian Libraries of the University of Oxford acquired the archive in March 2018. In autumn 2019, the Bodleian celebrated the acquisition with an exhibition of Meadows' work, Now and Then, accompanied by a book.

== Selected exhibitions ==
=== Solo exhibitions ===
- "The Free Photographic Omnibus." Museum of Modern Art Oxford, 1974.
- "Living Like This." Institute of Contemporary Arts (London), 1975. To coincide with publication of Meadows' book Living Like This.
- "Shuttles, Steam and Soot: A Cotton Mill in Lancashire." Half Moon Gallery (London), 1978.
- "Daniel Meadows." Uppermill Photographic Gallery (Oldham), 1981.
- "Suburbia." The Photographers' Gallery (London), 1987.
- "National Portraits: Photographs from the 1970s." Viewpoint Photography Gallery (Salford); Montage Gallery (Derby), 1997.
- "National Portraits: Now and Then." Irish Gallery of Photography (Dublin), 2000.
- "Now and Then." Photofusion Gallery (Brixton, London), 2001.
- "Daniel Meadows: Early Photographic Works." National Science and Media Museum (Bradford), 2011–2012; Ffotogallery (Penarth), 2012; the Gallery, Library of Birmingham, 2014; London College of Communication (London), 2015.
- "Now and Then." Weston Library, Bodleian Libraries, Oxford, October–November 2019.

=== Joint and group exhibitions ===
- "Photographs of Butlin's Filey." Impressions Gallery, York, 1972. With Martin Parr. Photographs of Butlin's in Filey.
- "Serpentine Photography 73." Serpentine Gallery (London), 1973. Curated by Peter Turner.
- "The Other Britain." National Theatre (London), and touring in Britain, 1982.
- "Look at Me: Mode en Fotografie in Groot-Brittannië 1960–1998." Curated by Brett Rogers and Val Williams. Kunsthal (Rotterdam), 1998.
- "How We Are: Photographing Britain from the 1840s to the Present." Curated by Val Williams and Susan Bright. Tate Britain (London), 2007.
- "The British Are Coming." Stephen Bulger Gallery (Toronto), 2007. With Chris Coekin and Tony Ray-Jones.
- "No Such Thing as Society." Curated by David Alan Mellor. Aberystwyth Arts Centre, 2008. Tullie House (Carlisle); Ujazdów Castle (Warsaw); 2008–2010.
- "Projections of Reality." Red October (Moscow), 2010. Meadows contributed "The Photobus".
- "The Other Britain Revisited: Photographs from New Society." Victoria and Albert Museum (London), 2010.
- "Cameras in the Community" (Fotonow). Plymouth Arts Centre, 2010. With Camper Obscura, Laundrette Residencies and South West Graduate Photography Prize.
- "A Record of England." MAC (Birmingham), 2011. With Homer Sykes.

== Permanent collections ==
- Bodleian Libraries (Oxford): Meadows' archive (previously at Birmingham Central Library, thereafter the Library of Birmingham).
- Victoria and Albert Museum (London)

== Publications ==
=== Books of work by Meadows ===
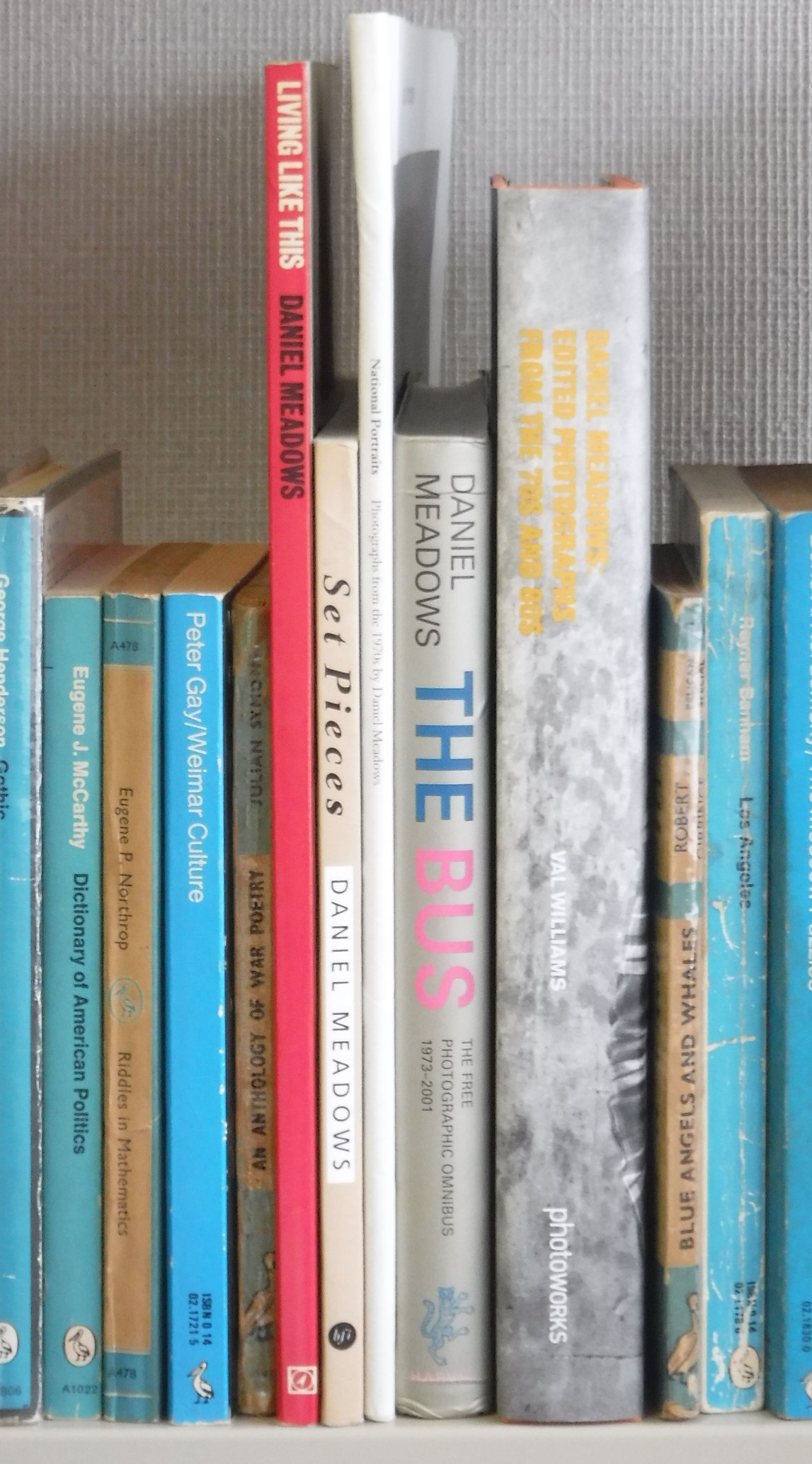
Five books of or about the photography of Daniel Meadows (flanked by irrelevant Pelicans); left to right: Living like This, Set Pieces, National Portraits, The Bus, Daniel Meadows

- Daniel Meadows. Living Like This: Around Britain in the Seventies. London: Arrow, 1975. ISBN 0-09-911400-3.
- Daniel Meadows. Nattering in Paradise: A Word from the Suburbs. London: Simon & Schuster, 1988. ISBN 0-671-69890-7. With Sara Tibbetts.
- Daniel Meadows. Set Pieces: Being about Film Stills Mostly. London: BFI, 1993. ISBN 0-85170-389-5, ISBN 0-85170-390-9.
- Daniel Meadows. National Portraits: Photographs from the 1970s. Edited by Val Williams. Salford: Viewpoint Photography Gallery; Derby: Montage Gallery, 1997. ISBN 0-901952-81-8.
- Daniel Meadows. The Bus: The Free Photographic Omnibus, 1973–2001: An Adventure in Documentary. London: Harvill, 2001. ISBN 1-86046-842-X. (Note: A review of The Bus: David Heathcote, "Another look at British identity", Eye, Autumn 2001.)
- Val Williams. Daniel Meadows: Edited Photographs from the 70s and 80s. Brighton: Photoworks, 2011. ISBN 1-903796-46-6. (Note: Photoworks' page (as retrieved by the Wayback Machine on 4 March 2016) about Daniel Meadows: Edited Photographs from the 70s and 80s.)
- Daniel Meadows. Now and Then: England 1970–2015. Oxford: Bodleian Library, 2019. ISBN 978-1-85124-533-8. (Note: The Bodleian Libraries' page about Now and Then.)
- Daniel Meadows. Book of the Road. London: Bluecoat, 2023. ISBN 9781908457783 (Note: Bluecoat's page about Book of the Road.)

=== Zines of work by Meadows ===
- Stockport Gypsies 1971. Southport: Café Royal, 2015. First in a series of eight zines by Meadows. Edition of 200 copies. (Note: Café Royal's page about Stockport Gypsies 1971.)
- Bancroft Shed Weaving 1976. Southport: Café Royal, 2015. Edition of 200 copies. (Note: Café Royal's page about Bancroft Shed Weaving 1976.)
- Bancroft Shed Engine House 1976. Southport: Café Royal, 2015. Edition of 200 copies. (Note: Café Royal's page about Bancroft Shed Engine House 1976.)
- Weldone Boiler Fluers 1976–1977. Southport: Café Royal, 2015. Edition of 200 copies. (Note: Café Royal's page about Weldone Boiler Fluers 1976–1977.)
- Steeplejack 1976. Southport: Café Royal, 2015. Edition of 200 copies. (Note: Café Royal's page about Steeplejack 1976.)
- Pig Killing 1975–1976. Southport: Café Royal, 2015. Edition of 200 copies. (Note: Café Royal's page about Pig Killing 1975–1976.)
- Welfare State International 1976–1983. Southport: Café Royal, 2015. Edition of 200 copies. (Note: Café Royal's page about Welfare State International 1976–1983.)
- Clayton Ward 1978. Southport: Café Royal, 2015. Edition of 200 copies. (Note: Café Royal's page about Clayton Ward 1978.)
- Eight Stories. Southport: Café Royal, 2015. Edition of 50 copies. Box set with eight Café Royal publications and a DVD of short films corresponding to each book. (Note: Café Royal's page about Eight Stories. The short films can all be found at Daniel Meadows' page at Vimeo.)
  - Eight Stories + One. Southport: Café Royal, 2020. Edition of 100 copies. Box set with eight Café Royal publications plus an essay by meadows, "The Daniel Meadows Archive in Nine People". (Note: Café Royal's page about Eight Stories + One.)
- The Shop on Greame Street 1972. Southport: Café Royal, 2016. Edition of 250 copies. (Note: Café Royal's page about The Shop on Greame Street 1972.)
- Testimony February 1987. Southport: Café Royal, 2018. Edition of 150 copies. (Note: Café Royal's page about Testimony February 1987.)
- Graffiti 1971–1983. Southport: Café Royal, 2018. Edition of 250 copies. (Note: Café Royal's page about Graffiti 1971–1983.)

=== Other appearances ===
- British Image 1: Photographs by Homer Sykes, Claire Schwob, John Myers, Daniel Meadows, Bryn Campbell, Roslyn Banish, Ian Dobbie, and Paul Carter. London: Arts Council of Great Britain, 1975. Meadows' "The Free Photographic Omnibus" appears on pp. 38–49.
- Julian Bream: A Life on the Road. London: Macdonald, 1982. ISBN 0-356-07880-9. About the lutenist Julian Bream. Text by Tony Palmer, photographs by Meadows.
- God in Wales Today: Religion in a Cathedral Town. The Newport Survey 6. Newport: Gwent College of Higher Education, 1986. ISBN 0-9507317-5-7. Edited by Meadows.
- Education: The 5 Rs: Reading, Riting, Rithmetic, Right, Rong: A Photographic Survey of Education in Newport. The Newport Survey 8. Newport: Gwent College of Higher Education, 1988. ISBN 0-9507317-7-3. Edited by Meadows.
- Look at Me: Fashion and Photography in Britain 1960 to the Present: A Touring Exhibition Curated by Brett Rogers and Val Williams. London: British Council, 1998. ISBN 0-86355-389-3.
- Love Stories. Granta 68. New York: Granta, 1999. ISBN 0-9645611-8-2. Ed. Ian Jack. Includes "Then and Now" by Meadows.
- How We Are: Photographing Britain from the 1840s to the Present, ed. Val Williams and Susan Bright. London: Tate Publishing, 2007. ISBN 978-1-85437-714-2.
- No Such Thing as Society: Photography in Britain 1967–1987: From the British Council and the Arts Council Collection, by David Alan Mellor. London: Hayward Publishing, 2007. ISBN 978-1-85332-265-5.

== Awards ==
- BAFTA Cymru Award, 2002, for Capture Wales.
- Honorary fellowship of the Royal Photographic Society, 2008.
