= Kashdan =

Kashdan is a surname. Notable people with the surname include:

- George Kashdan (1928-2006), American comic book writer and editor
- Isaac Kashdan (1905-1985), American chess grandmaster and chess writer
- John Kashdan (1917-2001), English painter, printmaker and teacher
- Todd Kashdan, American scientist, public speaker, and professor of psychology
