= Camera Owner =

Bi-monthly British hobbyist photography periodical 1964-1968

- Camera Owner magazine, cover of the first issue, 1964
- Editor: Bill Jay
- Former editors: Jürgen Schadeberg
- Frequency: Bi-monthly
- Format: A4
- Publisher: Davpet Ltd., then Coo Press
- Founder: Sylvester Stein
- Founded: 1964
- First issue: 1 June 1964; 62 years ago
- Final issue Number: 31 October 1967 no. 40, October 1967
- Country: United Kingdom
- Based in: London
- Language: English
- OCLC: 503854539

Camera Owner (1964–1968) was a bi-monthly British hobbyist photography magazine founded in 1964. In 1968 it evolved into Creative Camera, a monthly magazine of fine art and documentary photography, which in turn, in 2000, became DPICT before its publication ceased in 2001.

== History ==
When Camera Owner was launched in 1964 from 27 Whitfield Street, London, edited by Alec Fry ARPS previously of Amateur Photographer magazine, it offered pictorial 'how-to' articles for an audience ranging from the keen amateur to the dabbler with no interest in technical jargon; it was subtitled ‘The Teach-Yourself Photo Monthly’.

From Issue #8 of February 1965 South African photographer Jürgen Schadeberg, picture editor of the influential Drum magazine in the 1950s, took over as picture editor, exercising a stronger design and a bolder use of pictures. By Issue #10, in April 1965, Fry moved on to establish Polysales Progress mail order firm, and Schadeberg took on the editorship.

=== Reorientation ===
In July 1965, Bill Jay had contributed two articles to the magazine and by December of the same year he took over as Editor. His aim was to promote British photography as a serious art form to rival the U.S. Aperture and Norman Hall's Photography, and the Swiss Romeo Martinez' Camera. He instituted book reviews in 1966 (for example, of John Szarkowski's The Photographer's Eye, July 1967) and interviews (including with Aaron Siskind and David Douglas Duncan). Magazine content emphasised the aesthetics of photography over technique, and Jay encouraged his readers to initiate 'postal circles' by circulating a boxed print by mail to a group for feedback.

Colin Osman, himself a keen photographer, historian and collector of photography, and owner of Coo Press, a publishing house with a long and lucrative history of racing pigeon publications, bought the failing Camera Owner from the publishers Davpet Ltd. for £1 in 1966. Jay remained as editor and continued to change the style of the magazine, so that it attracted more serious readers and contributors, amongst them young British photographers like David Hurn and Tony Ray-Jones.

=== Reformation ===
Jay gradually transformed the ‘hobbyist’ Camera Owner during 1967, with the word ‘Creative’, in a smaller font, being placed above the title ‘Camera Owner’, and ‘Owner’ reduced, by December, to a smaller font so that ‘Creative Camera’ dominated the masthead. With the reorientation of content that Jay had introduced, the journal finally became Creative Camera alone in February 1968, continuing with that title through more than 30 years of publication.

== See also ==
- Creative Camera
- Bill Jay
