= Paddy Summerfield =

British photographer (1947–2024)

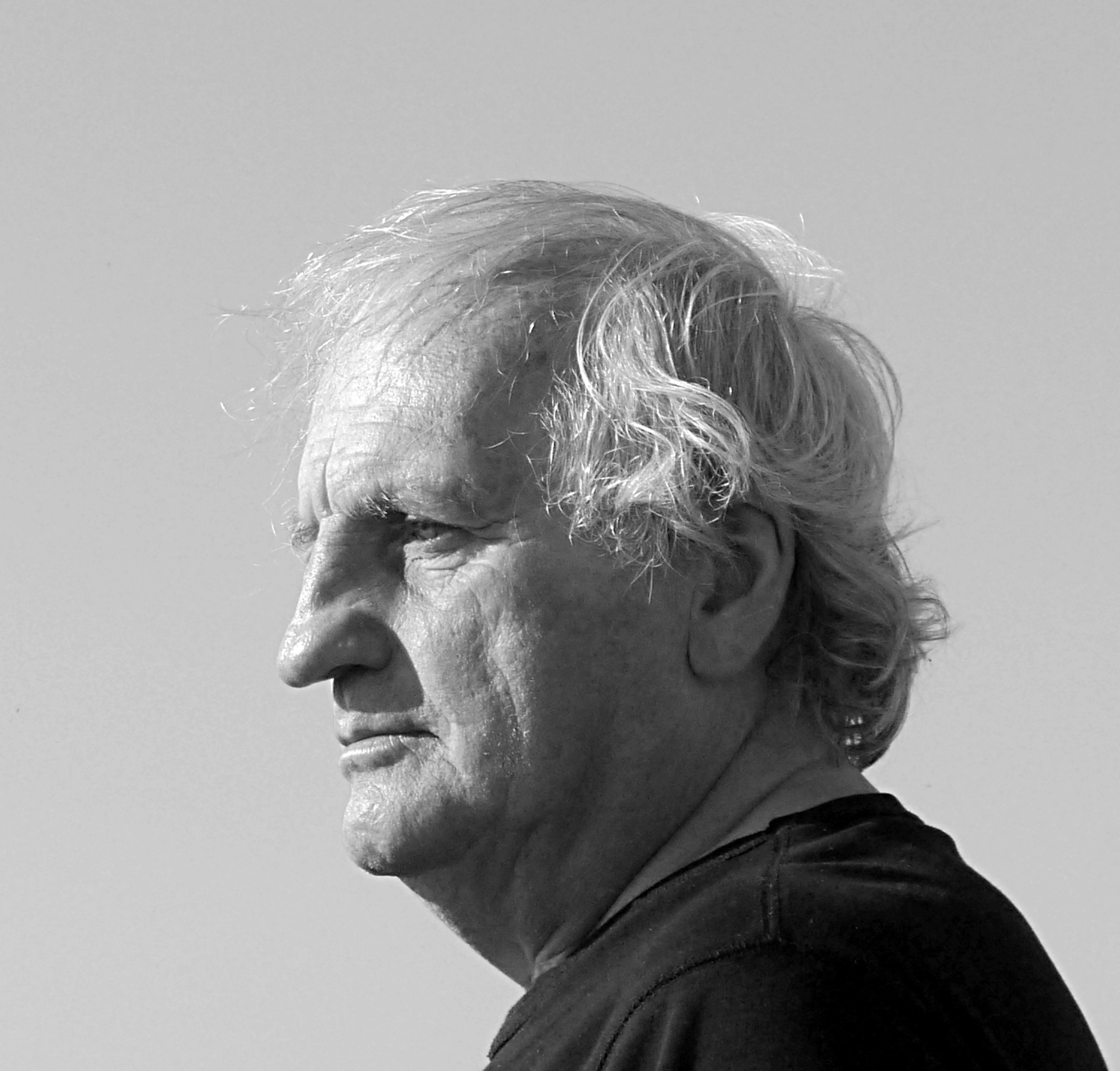
- Born: 18 February 1947; Derby, England
- Died: 11 April 2024 (aged 77)
- Education: Oxford Polytechnic (1965–1966); Guildford School of Art (1966–1968)

Paddy Summerfield (18 February 1947 – 11 April 2024) was a British photographer who lived and worked in Oxford all his life.

Summerfield is known for his "evocative series of black and white images, shot on 35mm film, which co-opt the traditional genre of documentary photography to realise a more personal and inward looking vision." He has said his photographs are exclusively about abandonment and loss.

== Life and career ==
Paddy Summerfield was born on 18 February 1947. After taking an Art Foundation course at the Oxford Polytechnic, Summerfield attended Guildford School of Art, studying firstly in the Photography Department, then joining the Film department the following year. In 1967, when still a first-year student, he made photographs that appeared in 1970 in Bill Jay's magazine Album. Between 1968 and 1978, Summerfield documented Oxford University students in the summer terms. His photographs appeared in Creative Camera, including the cover of its January 1974 issue. His work has been described as representing a "psychological perspective", in which the composition places the viewer at the scene's emotional apex and blurs the boundaries between subject, photographer and viewer. Throughout his life, Summerfield has focused on making photographic essays that are personal documents. From 1997 to 2007 he photographed his parents, his mother with Alzheimer's disease and his father caring for her.

Like It Is was Summerfield's first London exhibition, a group show in Dixon's Photographic Gallery, Oxford Street, in 1967. Since then, his work has been exhibited at other London venues, including the ICA Gallery, the Serpentine Gallery, the Barbican, and The Photographers' Gallery in its Newport Street home. Beneath the Dreaming Spires was held at the Museum of Modern Art, Oxford in 1976 and was later shown at the Institute of Contemporary Arts in London.

In 1974–75 the Arts Council of Great Britain made him an award to artists.

In 2019 Summerfield married Patricia Baker-Cassidy, who had become his collaborator and de facto producer. Their home in Summertown was often the meeting place of the Oxford Photography Group, and Summerfield worked closely with individual photographers, many of whom went on to their own success. Between 2023 and 2024 the Bodleian Libraries acquired his archive.

Summerfield died on 11 April 2024, at the age of 77.

== Publications ==
=== Books by Summerfield ===
- Mother and Father. Stockport, UK: Dewi Lewis, 2014. ISBN 978-1-907893-61-2. (Note: Dewi Lewis's page about Mother and Father is here.)
- The Oxford Pictures 1968–1978. Stockport, UK: Dewi Lewis, 2016. ISBN 978-1-907893-99-5. (Note: Dewi Lewis's page about The Oxford Pictures is here.)
- Empty Days. Stockport, UK: Dewi Lewis, 2018. ISBN 978-1-911306-23-8. (Note: Dewi Lewis's page about Empty Days is here.)
- The Holiday Pictures. Stockport, UK: Dewi Lewis, 2019. ISBN 978-1-911306-48-1. (Note: Dewi Lewis's page about The Holiday Pictures is here.)
- Home Movie. Stockport, UK: Dewi Lewis, 2021. ISBN 978-1-911306-77-1. With an essay by Patricia Baker-Cassidy. (Note: Dewi Lewis's page about Home Movie is here.)
- The Beginnings of Eternity. Stockport, UK: Dewi Lewis, 2024. ISBN 978-1-911306-97-9. (Note: Dewi Lewis's page about The Beginnings of Eternity is here.)

=== Smaller publications by Summerfield ===
- Weekend Away. Southport, UK: Café Royal, 2016. Edition of 200 copies. (Note: Café Royal's page about Weekend Away is here.)
- Remember Hope. Photopaper 17. Fotobookfestival Kassel, 2017. Edited by Gerry Badger. (Note: The page about Remember Hope at Photopaper's website is here.)
- Distant Times. Southport, UK: Café Royal, 2018. Edition of 250 copies. (Note: Café Royal's page about Distant Times is here.)

=== Publications with others ===
- Serpentine Photography 73: The Arts Council presents work by 43 young photographers. London: Arts Council of Great Britain, 1973. ISBN 978-0900085949. 45 cards (90 sides) in an envelope.
- Family: Photographers Photograph Their Families. Edited by Sophie Spencer-Wood. London and New York: Phaidon, 2005. ISBN 0714844020.

== Exhibitions ==
=== Solo exhibitions ===
- 1976: Beneath the Dreaming Spires, Museum of Modern Art, Oxford; Institute of Contemporary Arts, London
- 1992: Retrospective, Ruskin School of Art, Oxford
- 2005: Empty Days, Ovada, Oxford
- 2019–2020: The Holiday Pictures, Flow Photographic Gallery, London
- 2025: Paddy Summerfield: the camera helps, Bodleian Library, Oxford

=== Group exhibitions ===
- 1967: Like It Is, Dixon's Photographic Gallery, London
- 1971: Young Contemporaries I Creative Camera Travelling Exhibition
- 1972: Young Contemporaries II Creative Camera Travelling Exhibition
- 1973: Serpentine Photography '73, Serpentine Gallery, London. Curated by Peter Turner
- 1974: Co-Optic Real Britain, 19 February – 9 March. With Co-Optic group members Martin Parr, Chris Steele-Perkins, Peter Turner, and Nick Hedges.
- 1975: Young British Photographers, with Brian Griffin, Chris Steele-Perkins, etc, Museum of Modern Art, Oxford; The Photographers' Gallery, London; then travelling UK, Europe, USA
- 1975: International Photography, Museum of Modern Art, São Paulo
- 1976: Previous Exhibitors, Serpentine Gallery, London
- 1977: Singular Realities, Museum of Modern Art, Oxford; Side Gallery, Newcastle
- 1977: Concerning Photography, 6 July – 27 August, The Photographers' Gallery, London
- 1982: The Third Meaning, Museum of Modern Art, Oxford
- 1982: Under the Arches, Stedelijk Museum, Leiden
- 1984: Sequences, Cambridge Darkroom
- 1987: The Bradford Challenge, National Museum of Photography, Film and Television, Bradford
- 1988: Death, Cambridge Darkroom
- 1989: Through the Looking Glass, Barbican Centre, London
- 1989: Sun Life Photography Awards, National Museum of Photography, Film and Television, Bradford
- 2004: English Eyes, Leica Gallery, New York City. Curated by Peter Hamilton.

== Film about Summerfield ==
- Mother and Father (2015) – FullBleed Productions

== Collections ==
- Arts Council of Great Britain, London
- Bodleian Library, Oxford
- Victoria and Albert Museum, London
- The Hyman Collection
