= Loss of Face =

Loss of Face may refer to:

- "Loss of Face", episode in the first season of Bump in the Night
- "Loss of Face", episode of Mummies Alive!
- "Loss of Face", exhibition by British photographic artist John Goto
- Loss of face, a social concept to describe humiliation
