= Album (magazine) =

Defunct British photography magazine

- The cover of the first issue of Album magazine
- Categories: Art photography magazine
- Frequency: Monthly
- First issue: February 1970
- Final issue: January 1971
- Company: Album Photographic Ltd.
- Country: United Kingdom

Album was a monthly art photography magazine from Album Photographic Ltd. that published 12 issues between February 1970 and January 1971.

Although it was a short-lived publication, Album is important in that it featured budding photographers who have since become notable, including several members of Magnum Photos. Featured photographers include Bill Brandt, W. Eugene Smith and Emmet Gowin.

== History and profile ==
Album was founded and edited by Bill Jay (previously editor of Creative Camera); the publisher was Aidan Ellis (also previously with Creative Camera, as artist and publisher); and Tristram Powell, a television and film director, was in charge of finance.

Album remains unique in publishing a combination of contemporary and historical photographers, along with essays and some poetry and drawings.

== Issues ==
=== Issue 1, February 1970 ===
The February 1970 issue of Album (Note: A PDF of the magazine can be found here within a Wayback Machine copy of Bill Jay's website.) featured the following photographers: (Note: As with the following lists, this one is not exhaustive. As an example, this first issue also contains material by or about Eikoh Hosoe, Peter Cundall, Jeffrey Blankfort, Philip Jones Griffiths, Lee Friedlander, George Rodger, Jim Dine, and more.)

- Benjamin Stone
- Bill Brandt (also, front cover)
- Roger Mertin
- Sylvester Jacobs

=== Issue 2, March 1970 ===
The March 1970 issue of Album (Note: A PDF of the magazine can be found here within a Wayback Machine copy of Bill Jay's website.) featured the following photographers:

- P. H. Emerson
- W. Eugene Smith (also, front cover)
- David Hurn
- Paddy Summerfield

=== Issue 3, April 1970 ===
The April 1970 issue of Album (Note: A PDF of the magazine can be found here within a Wayback Machine copy of Bill Jay's website.) featured the following photographers:

- Eugène Atget
- Tony Ray-Jones (also, front cover)
- Thurston Hopkins
- Roger Mertin

=== Issue 4, May 1970 ===
The May 1970 issue of Album (Note: A PDF of the magazine can be found here within a Wayback Machine copy of Bill Jay's website.) featured the following photographers:

- Lewis Hine
- Les Krims
- Cas Oorthuys (also, front cover)
- Thomas Barrow

=== Issue 5, June 1970 ===
The June 1970 issue of Album (Note: A PDF of the magazine can be found here within a Wayback Machine copy of Bill Jay's website.) featured the following photographers:

- Andrew Lanyon
- Ernst Höltzer
- Imogen Cunningham (also, front cover)
- Emmet Gowin

=== Issue 6, July 1970 ===
The July 1970 issue of Album (Note: A PDF of the magazine can be found here within a Wayback Machine copy of Bill Jay's website.) featured selections from the 50,000 prints in the George Eastman House Collections

=== Issue 7, August 1970 ===
The August 1970 issue of Album (Note: A PDF of the magazine can be found here within a Wayback Machine copy of Bill Jay's website.) featured the following photographers:

- Eugène Atget (photographed by Berenice Abbott, front cover)
- Paul Martin
- Berenice Abbott
- Duane Michals
- David Hockney

=== Issue 8, September 1970 ===
The September 1970 issue of Album (Note: A PDF of the magazine can be found here within a Wayback Machine copy of Bill Jay's website.) featured the following photographers:

- Roger Mertin
- Brassaï
- Edward Weston
- George Rodger (also, front cover)

=== Issue 9, October 1970 ===
The ninth issue of Album (Note: The ninth issue was not available on Bill Jay's website.) featured the following photographers:

- John Claridge (also, front cover)
- Manuel Álvarez Bravo
- Satyajit Ray
- Charles Harbutt
- John Thomson
- Sir William J Newton

=== Issue 10, October 1970 ===
The tenth issue of Album (Note: A PDF of the magazine can be found here within a Wayback Machine copy of Bill Jay's website.) featured the following photographers:

- Naomi Savage
- Anne Noggle
- Patrick Ward (also, front cover)

=== Issue 11, December 1970 ===
The December 1970 issue of Album (Note: A PDF of the magazine can be found here within a Wayback Machine copy of Bill Jay's website.) featured the following:

- The Royal Photographic Society permanent collection
- Gordon Bennett
- Don McCullin
- Braquehais
- Allen A. Dutton

=== Issue 12, January 1971 ===
The final issue of Album (Note: A PDF of the magazine can be found here within a Wayback Machine copy of Bill Jay's website.) featured the following photographers:

- Édouard Boubat
- Elliott Erwitt (also, front cover)
- Gianni Berengo Gardin
