= Susan Allix =

British bookbinder and book artist

Susan Allix (b. 1943) is a British typesetter, bookbinder, and artist known for her work in book arts.

== Early life and education ==
Allix attended Guildford School of Art where she studied painting. She has an MA in printmaking at the Royal College of Art. She studied engraving in Italy while on a Prix de Rome scholarship.

== Career ==
The Smithsonian says of Allix's work, "Allix's books are distinctive in that she handles every aspect from conception to production: printing, typography, layout, and binding or box making. She prints in limited editions using letterpress-printed text, illustrations printed as etchings, linoleum cuts, woodcuts, pochoir stenciling, and hand-painted additions; she also binds the books herself. The paper used for the books' pages is usually collected from her travels or ordered with a specific purpose in mind and runs the gamut from commercially molded sheets, to decoratively patterned sheets, to handmade fine art papers."

Allix works under the imprint the Willow Press.

Her work is in the U.K. Government Art Collection, the Yale Center for British Art, the Smithsonian Libraries, and the National Museum of Women in the Arts, among others.

=== Works ===
- Rubaiyat of Omar Khayyam
- Pyramids, 1995
- Palm Tree Sketchbook, 2006
- Colours of Persia, 2011
- Egyptian Green, 2003
