= John Hedgecoe =

British photographer (1932–2010)

John Hedgecoe (24 March 1932 – 3 June 2010) was a British photographer and author of over 30 books on photography. He established the photography department in 1965 at the Royal College of Art, where he was Professor from 1975 to 1994 and Professor Emeritus until his death. He was also Pro-Rector of the college from 1981 to 1994. His photographs appear in permanent collections at the New York Museum of Modern Art and London's National Portrait Gallery.

== Early life ==
Hedgecoe was born in Brentford, Middlesex. John Hedgecoe received his first camera from his father at the age of 14. Hedgecoe was evacuated during World War II. They settled in Gulval, a village near Penzance in Cornwall where he attended the local school.

== Education ==
Hedgecoe attended Guildford School of Art (now University for the Creative Arts), while also completing his National Service with the RAF. During his service with the RAF, Hedgecoe experimented with aerial photographic surveys of bomb damage from the war. In 1957, he started work as a staff photographer at Queen magazine, working there until 1972.

== Creative work ==
In the main, Hedgecoe's works are focused on artists and writers. He said: "A good portrait photograph should try to tell us something about the subject's character, for the portrait is a visual biography in a sense." One of Hedgecoe's books was a Henry Spencer Moore, published in 1968. Most photographs by John Hedgecoe are stored at the Sainsbury Centre for Visual Arts in Norwich.

== Postage stamps ==
Hedgecoe's profile shot of the Queen, taken by him in June 1967, was used by Arnold Machin to make a plaster version. Once the plaster version was produced, Hedgecoe photographed it for the stamp image. It is one of the most-reproduced images, with over 200 billion copies sold.

== Personal life ==
In 1960, Hedgecoe married Julia Mardon. The couple had three children: Sebastian, Dolly and Auberon.

== Publications ==
- Manual of Photography Focal Press, 1977, ISBN 0240509579
- The Art of Colour Photography Mitchell Beazley for Marks and Spencer, 1984 ISBN 0855335505
- John Hedgecoe's Nude Photography Simon Schuster, 1984 ISBN 0-671-52326-0
- John Hedgecoe's Practical Landscape Photography Ebury Press, 1988 ISBN 0-85223-651-4
- The Photographer’s Handbook Alfred A. Knopf, 1992, ISBN 0679742042
- John Hedgecoe's Camcorder Basics Collins & Brown Limited 1995, ISBN 0817440437
- Breakfast with Dolly, novel (1996)
- John Hedgecoe's 35mm Photography Collins & Brown, 1999, ISBN 9781855857148
- The New Manual of Photography DK Publishing, 2003
- John Hedgecoe's Complete Guide to Black White Photography Sterling, 2005, ISBN 1402728123
- How to Take Great Photographs Collins & Brown, 2005, ISBN 1843403307
- The Art of Digital Photography Dorling Kindersley, 2009, ISBN 9781405340939
- John Hedgecoe's Advanced Photography Mitchell Beazley, 1982, ISBN 0855333839
