= A House in Bayswater =

1960 short TV film by Ken Russell

- Directed by: Ken Russell
- Edited by: Allan Tyrer
- Production company: BBC
- Release date: 1959
- Running time: 30 minutes
- Country: United Kingdom
- Language: English

A House in Bayswater is a 1959 British short television documentary directed by Ken Russell. It was his first BBC film not made for the Monitor series.

The film was selected by Simon Jenkins to appear in the BBC Four Collections archive on BBC iPlayer.

== Outline ==
A portrait of a five-storey Victorian house in Bayswater, London, and of the people who live there: photographer David Hurn, dance teacher Helen May, painter James Burr, retiree Margaret Croft, wine merchants Tom and Louisa Laden, and housekeeper Mrs Elizabeth Collins. Also features Miss L. Wigan, Miss A. O'Donaghue, Miss A. Sieveking and Mr J. Warren.
