= Heda Armour =

British artist

Hedvig Sophie "Heda" Armour (23 May 1914 – 20 February 1996) was a British painter and etcher.

== Biography ==
Armour was born in 1914 in Recife, Brazil, to Stewart, a civil engineer from London, and Gabrielle Matilda (née Crosse) Armour. Her father died in 1925, when she was 11. After a private education, Armour trained at the Guildford School of Art from 1930 to 1933 before spending six years studying at the Royal Academy Schools, where her teachers included Walter Thomas Monnington and Sir Walter Westley Russell. Armour went on to become a regular exhibitor at the Royal Academy in London and elsewhere in Britain. She lived at Cranleigh in Surrey and the British Museum holds an example of her work.

Armour was married at least twice. In 1935, she married fellow artist John Pelham Napper in Cranleigh. In 1945, she married Harry Pirbright Munro. They had a son, Alan Guy Michael. She and her son later used the surname Berkeley.
