= Todd Kashdan =

American psychologist

- Born: Todd Barrett Kashdan
- Education: Cornell University (BS); University at Buffalo (MA, PhD)
- Known for: Research on curiosity
- Awards: American Psychological Association's 2013 Distinguished Scientific Early Career Award
- Scientific career
- Fields: Psychology
- Institutions: George Mason University
- Website: toddkashdan.com

Todd Barrett Kashdan is an American psychologist. He is a professor of psychology and director of the Well-Being Laboratory at George Mason University. His research explores why people suffer, with an emphasis on the transition from normal to pathological anxiety. Other research explores the nature of well-being, with an emphasis on the critical functions of curiosity, meaning and purpose in life, and psychological flexibility to human performance.

== Education and career ==
Kashdan received his undergraduate degree from Cornell University in 1996. He conducted research with Arthur Aron at Stony Brook University to identify what character traits drive attraction. While a doctoral student at the University at Buffalo, State University of New York, together with Paul Rose and under the direction of Francis Fincham, he explored how people's curiosity affects their relationships.

Kashdan became an assistant professor at George Mason University in 2004 and became a full professor in 2014.

=== Research ===
Together with John Roberts, Kashdan studied how curiosity affects the successfulness of a relationship, exploring, for instance, if curious people are more active listeners, if they show more interest, and if they ask more thoughtful questions. Since 2004, Kashdan has also taught at George Mason University, where he is a tenured professor and leads the Well-Being Laboratory. The lab received a $1 million research grant from the Charles Koch Foundation by 2020.

Kashdan has found that curiosity is key to a "happy, fulfilling life". He states that it helps make even tedious tasks more enjoyable, by focusing on the details and capturing the childlike sense of awe and wonder. He wrote a chapter about how curiosity is a character strength for Character Strengths and Virtues by Christopher Peterson and Martin Seligman. From his research, Kashdan has found that curiosity leads to better performance, because curious people are more open to learning and are more engaged.

He has also found that people who practice gratitude are better able to interact with others in their work and personal lives, because they are more likely to be more considerate of other people and less aggressive in response to insults.

=== Investigation, disciplinary action, and lawsuit ===
In 2019, Kashdan was chastised by George Mason University for "lack of appropriate professional behavior" and gender-based sexual harassment of graduate students. He was reprimanded and ordered to undergo sexual harassment prevention training. He was also banned from teaching graduate courses for a period of two years. He continued teaching undergraduate courses during this period. In 2020, Kashdan lost a lawsuit against the university over the sanctions; in 2023, he also lost an appeal. He argued in the lawsuit that he had faced "anti-male bias" in the university disciplinary process.

== Awards and honors ==
Kashdan received the American Psychological Association's 2013 Distinguished Scientific Early Career Award.

== Books ==
- Kennon M. Sheldon; Todd B. Kashdan; Michael F. Steger, eds. (January 3, 2011). Designing Positive Psychology: Taking Stock and Moving Forward. Oxford University Press. ISBN 978-0-19-970626-6.
- Todd B. Kashdan; Joseph Ciarrochi, eds. (April 1, 2013). Mindfulness, Acceptance, and Positive Psychology: The Seven Foundations of Well-Being. New Harbinger. ISBN 978-1-60882-339-0.

For the general public:

- Todd Kashdan (April 21, 2009). Curious?: Discover the Missing Ingredient to a Fulfilling Life. HarperCollins. ISBN 978-0-06-166118-1.
- Todd B. Kashdan; Robert Biswas-Diener (October 2014). The Upside of Your Dark Side: Why being your whole self – not just your "good" self – drives success and fulfillment. Hudson Street Press. ISBN 978-1594631733.
- Todd B. Kashdan (February 15, 2022). The Art of Insubordination: How to Dissent and Defy Effectively. Avery Publishing. ISBN 978-0593420881.
