= John Kashdan =

English painter (1917–2001)

John Erhart Kashdan (12 February 1917 – 22 February 2001) was an English painter, printmaker and teacher of Russian Jewish descent. He studied at the Royal Academy Schools and later exhibited in London and America before withdrawing from exhibiting around 1950 to focus on his teaching career. His work in the 1940s was influenced by Pablo Picasso, Juan Gris and Georges Braque. Post-war influences include Paul Klee and José Guadalupe Posada as well as contemporaries Robert Colquhoun and Robert MacBryde.

== Biography ==
John Kashdan was born in Islington, London to a Russian Jewish father, 'Jack' Kashdan, and English mother, Maud. At 12, he decided to become an artist, but left school at 14 to become a dentist's assistant. Attending Charles Genge's evening classes at the Working Men's Institute in Bethnal Green led to him applying to the Royal Academy schools.

He started at the Royal Academy schools in 1936, winning an RA Gold Medal in his first year and British Institute and Landseer Scholarships. He used the travelling scholarship to visit the south of France between 1936 and 1939.

In 1940, Kashdan turned down a grant at the Royal College of Art and moved to Cambridge in 1943. Work painted in this period showed the influence of Picasso, Braque and Juan Gris.

Kashdan had his first one-man show at the Redfern Gallery in 1945 after encouragement from fellow artist Gustav Kahnweiler. Kashdan's work mainly featured still lifes, using flamboyant colour and bold lines. Acquaintance Henry Moore brought Kashdan's work to the attention of James J Sweeney, of the Museum of Modern Art, New York who displayed his work there in 1946.

During the 1940s and 1950s Kashdan produced a broad array of monotype prints, influenced by Paul Klee and his artist friend Richard Ziegler. Ziegler introduced Kashdan to a print-making process he developed using transfer drawing and duplicator paper; Kashdan would use this technique for many pieces during this time. Another method adopted by Kashdan was etching on to acetate and a simple form of screenprinting. His work in this period used archetypal human forms and sinister tones to represent the suffering themes of the Second World War. An associate of Klee's, Jankel Adler saw Kashdan's prints and introduced him to Robert Colquhoun, Robert MacBryde and John Minton. Inspired by Kashdan's work they began to create their own monotypes.

Kashdan moved away from the art world towards the middle of the 1940s, though his monotypes and drawings were exhibited in 1947 at the Art Institute of Chicago and, in 1948, at the Philadelphia Art Alliance. Taking up a teaching post at the Royal Naval College, Devon in 1946, he then moved to Guildford School of Art in 1951 withdrawing from public exhibitions for 38 years (except a poster design for London Transport and a small group exhibition at Surrey University in 1971).

After the Guildford sit-in, Kashdan and 40 other staff were sacked. Magnus Magnusson examined the events in a BBC radio programme Cause for Concern. Kashdan was moved to Epsom College of Art as tutor librarian where he retired in 1982.

After his retirement, Kashdan's paintings and monotypes were once more publicly displayed in a retrospective of his work from 1940 to 1955 at England & co gallery, London. Following the exhibition, the British Museum's department of prints and drawings acquired a selection of Kashdan's work. The museum then displayed parts of this collection in their Avant-Garde British Printmaking 1914–60 exhibition in 1990. The last exhibition of his work in Kashdan's lifetime was in 1991, displaying a collection of his monotypes from 1941 to 1991.
