= Bill Brandt =

British photographer (1904–1983)

- Born: Hermann Wilhelm Brandt; 2 May 1904; Hamburg, German Empire
- Died: 20 December 1983 (aged 79); London, England
- Known for: Photography
- Website: billbrandt.com

Bill Brandt (born Hermann Wilhelm Brandt [bʁant]; 2 May 1904 – 20 December 1983) was a British photographer and photojournalist. Born in Germany, Brandt moved to England, where he became known for his images of British society for such magazines as Lilliput and Picture Post; later he made distorted nudes, portraits of famous artists and landscapes. He is widely considered to be one of the most important British photographers of the 20th century.

== Life and work ==
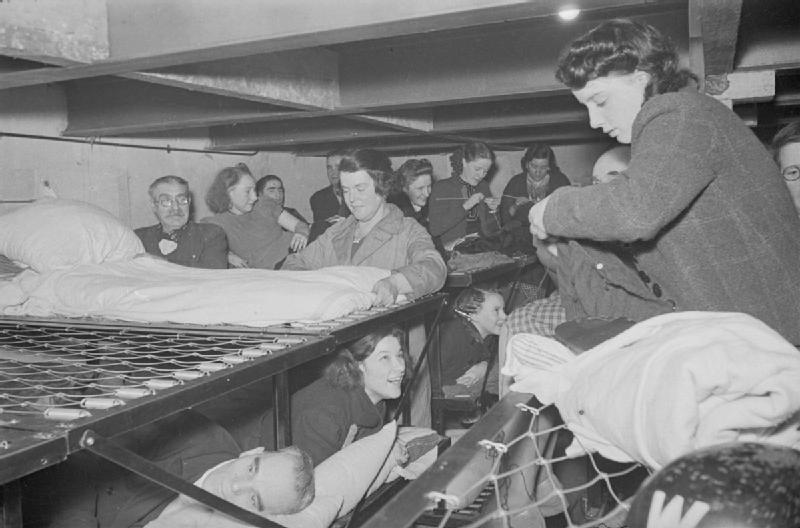
Photograph of a north London air raid shelter taken by Brandt in 1940

Born in Hamburg, Germany, son of a British father and German mother, Brandt grew up during World War I, during which his father, who had lived in Germany since the age of five, was interned for six months by the Germans as a British citizen. Brandt later disowned his German heritage and would claim he was born in south London. Shortly after the war, he contracted tuberculosis and spent much of his youth in a sanatorium in Davos, Switzerland. He traveled to Vienna to undertake a course of treatment by psychoanalysis. He was, in any case, pronounced cured and was taken under the wing of socialite Eugenie Schwarzwald. When Ezra Pound visited the Schwarzwald residence, Brandt made his portrait. In appreciation, Pound reportedly offered Brandt an introduction to Man Ray, whose Paris studio and darkroom Brandt would access in 1930.

In 1933 Brandt moved to London and began documenting all levels of British society. From 1936 he began to document the British class system in 1936, encouraged by his reading of George Orwell's essays and J. B. Priestley's 1934 An English Journey, He said later: "the extreme social contrast, during those years before the war, was, visually, very inspiring for me. I started by photographing in London, the West End, the suburbs, the slums." He documented the 1936 Jarrow March, then he travelled to the northeast of England, to capture the effects of the 1930s depression on the industrial landscape of the United Kingdom. He then focused predominantly on recording domestic scenes of miners in Northumberland, and then the urban landscape of Halifax, West Yorkshire, of which he later said, in a rare late career interview, as being "absolutely extraordinary; a real dream town – I'd never seen anything like it before.

This kind of documentary was uncommon at that time. Brandt published two books showcasing this work, The English at Home (1936) and A Night in London (1938). He was a regular contributor to magazines such as Lilliput, Picture Post, and Harper's Bazaar. He documented the Underground bomb shelters of London during The Blitz in 1940, commissioned by the Ministry of Information. Brandt took a total of 39 photos between the 4th and 12th of November before he had to stop due to catching the flu. The photos were taken with a Rolleiflex camera.

During World War II Brandt concentrated on many subjects – as can be seen in his Camera in London (1948) but excelled in portraiture and landscape. To mark the arrival of peace in 1945 he began a celebrated series of nudes. His major books from the post-war period are Literary Britain (1951), and Perspective of Nudes (1961), followed by a compilation of his best work, Shadow of Light (1966). Brandt became Britain's most influential and internationally admired photographer of the 20th century.

Many of his works have important social commentary but also poetic resonance. A well-known picture is Dancing the Lambeth Walk, showing a line of teenage girls laughing as one of their number, in borrowed high heels, dances jauntily, her right hand blurred in motion. Originally published in 1943 in the magazine Picture Post, it is one of four by Brandt that appeared in world-touring The Family of Man, attended by more than 9 million visitors, and in the accompanying book catalogue.

His landscapes and nudes are dynamic, intense and powerful, often using wide-angle lenses and distortion.

Brandt died in London in 1983.

== Recognition ==
In 1984, Bill Brandt was posthumously inducted into the International Photography Hall of Fame and Museum.

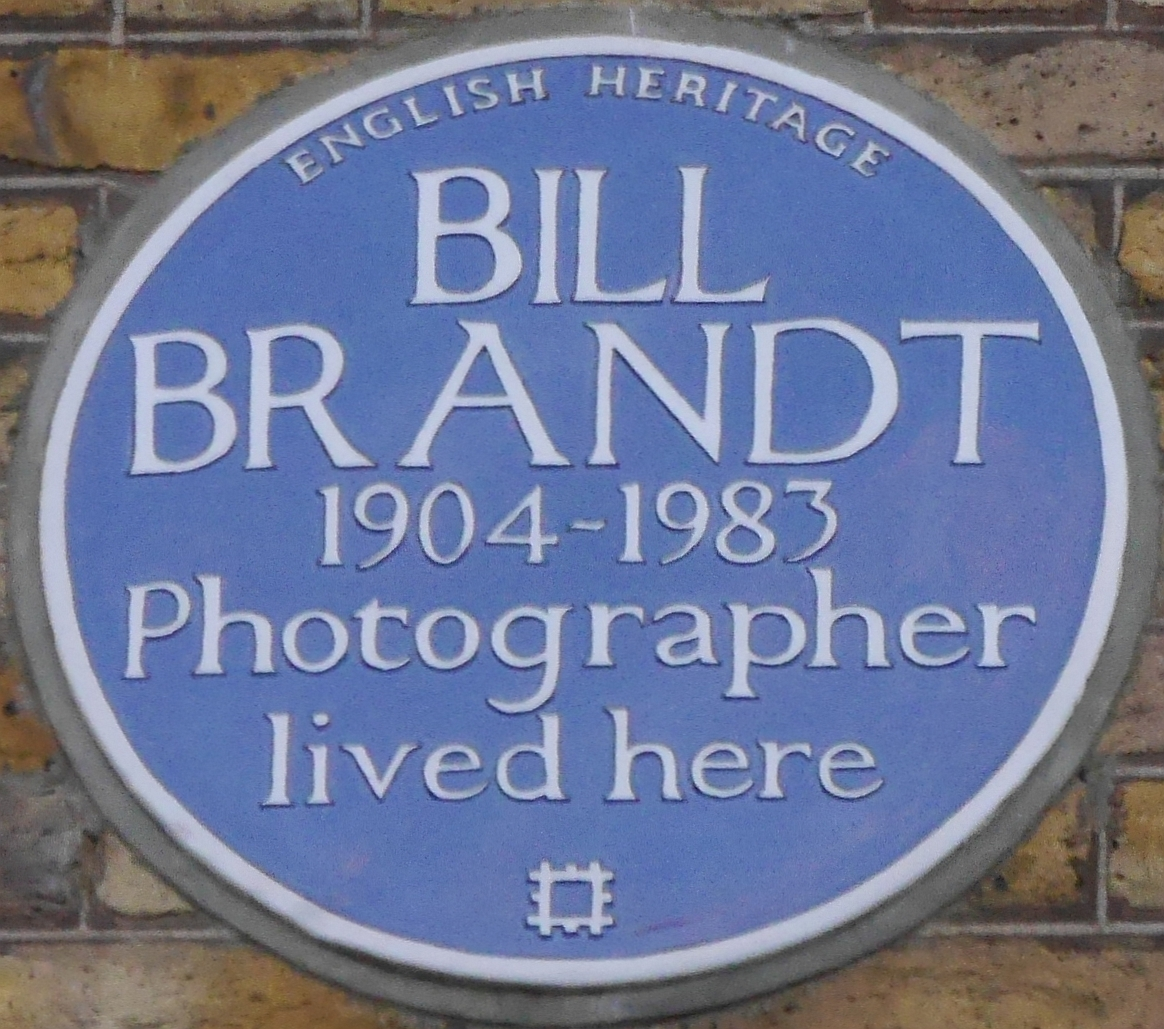
Blue plaque, 4 Airlie Gardens

In 2010, an English Heritage blue plaque for Brandt was erected in London at 4 Airlie Gardens, Kensington, W8.

== Exhibitions ==
- 1955: represented in The Family of Man
- 1969: Bill Brandt, Museum of Modern Art, New York. Curated by John Szarkowski.
- 1970: Bill Brandt: Photographs, Arts Council of Great Britain, London
- 1975: Bill Brandt: Early Photographs, 1930–1942, Arts Council of Great Britain, London
- 1976: Bill Brandt, Marlborough Fine Art, London [and/or New York]
- 1981: Bill Brandt: A Retrospective Exhibition, Royal Photographic Society/National Centre of Photography, Bath
- 1982: Bill Brandt: Portraits, National Portrait Gallery, London
- 1983: Bill Brandt: War Work, The Photographers Gallery, London
- 1985: Bill Brandt: Behind the Camera, Philadelphia Museum of Art. Curated by Michael E. Hoffman and Jan Howard.
- 2004: Bill Brandt: A Centenary Retrospective, Victoria & Albert Museum, London. Curated by John-Paul Kernot.
- 2013: Shadow and Light, Museum of Modern Art, New York. Curated by Sarah Hermanson Meister.
- 2013: Bill Brandt, Early Prints from the Collection of the Family, Edwynn Houk Gallery, New York.
- 2017: Bill Brandt, Works from the 1940's and Harper's Bazaar, William Holman Gallery, New York.
- 2018: Bill Brandt Vintage Works, Michael Hoppen Gallery, London.
- 2021: Bill Brandt, Kunstfoyer (Versicherungskammer Kulturstiftung), Munich.
- 2022: Bill Brandt: Inside the Mirror, Tate Britain, London. Curated by Carol Jacobi.

== Literature ==
=== Publications ===
- The English at Home. Introduction by Raymond Mortimer. London: B. T. Batsford/New York: C. Scribner's, 1936.
- A Night in London. The story of a London night. London: Country Life/New York: C. Scribner's/Paris: Arts et Métiers Graphiques, 1938.
- Camera in London. Text by Bill Brandt, commentary by Nora Wilson. London: Focal, 1948.
- Literary Britain. Introduction by John Hayward. London: Cassell, 1951.
  - 2nd ed.: edited and with an afterword by Mark Haworth-Booth. London: Victoria and Albert Museum, 1984.
- Perspective of Nudes. Preface by Lawrence Durrell, introduction by Chapman Mortimer. London: The Bodley Head/New York: Amphoto, 1961.
  - French ed.: Perspectives sur le nu. Paris: Prisma, 1961.
- Shadow of Light. A Collection of Photographs from 1931 to 1966. Introduction by Cyril Connolly, notes by Marjorie Becket. London: Bodley Head/New York: Viking, 1966
  - French ed.: Ombres d'une île. Paris: Le Belier Prisma, 1967.

=== Monographs ===
- Bill Brandt: Photographs. Exhibition catalogue, introduction by Aaron Scharf. London: Arts Council of Great Britain, 1970.
  - 2nd English ed.: additional introduction by Mark Haworth-Booth. London: Gordon Fraser Gallery/New York: Da Capo, 1977.
- Bill Brandt: Early Photographs, 1930–1942. Exhibition catalogue, introduction by Peter Turner. London: Arts Council of Great Britain, 1975.
- Bill Brandt. Exhibition catalogue, essay by Norman Hall. New York: Marlborough Fine Art, 1976.
- Bill Brandt: Nudes 1945–1980. Introduction by Michael Hiley. London and Bedford: G. Fraser/Boston: New York Graphic Society, 1980. ISBN 9780860920519/ISBN 9780821210970.
  - 2nd ed.: Herbert Press Ltd, 1990, ISBN 9781871569247.
- Photographs by Bill Brandt. Introduction by Mark Haworth-Booth. Washington DC: International Exhibitions Foundation, 1980.
- Bill Brandt: A Retrospective Exhibition. Catalogue, introduction by David Mellor. Bath: Royal Photographic Society/National Centre of Photography, 1981.
- Bill Brandt: Portraits. Introduction by Alan Ross. London: G. Fraser/Austin: University of Texas Press, 1982.
- Bill Brandt: Portraits. Exhibition catalogue, introduction by Richard Ormond. London: National Portrait Gallery, 1982.
- Bill Brandt: War Work. Exhibition catalogue. London: The Photographers Gallery, 1983.
- Bill Brandt: London in the Thirties. London: G. Fraser, 1984.
  - US ed.: Introduction by Mark Haworth-Booth. New York: Pantheon, 1984.
- Bill Brandt: Behind the Camera. Photographs 1923–1983. Published in connection with the exhibition in Philadelphia. Introductions by Mark Haworth-Booth, essay by David Mellor. New York: Aperture, 1985.
- Bill Brandt: Photographs 1928–1983. London: Thames and Hudson, 1993.
- Warburton, Nigel (ed.). Bill Brandt; Selected texts and bibliography. Oxford: Clio, 1993; Macmillan Library Reference, 1994.
- The Photographs of Bill Brandt. London: Thames and Hudson, 1999.
- Delany, Paul: Bill Brandt: A Life. Stanford University Press, 2004.
- Brandt: Nudes. London: Thames and Hudson, 2012.
- Hermanson Meister, Sarah. Shadow and Light. Exhibition catalogue. New York: Museum of Modern Art, 2013. ISBN 9780870708459.
