= Anne Noggle =

American aviator and photographer

- Born: 1922; Evanston, Illinois
- Died: August 16, 2005; Albuquerque, New Mexico
- Education: University of New Mexico
- Known for: Photography, Aviation

Anne Noggle (1922 – August 16, 2005) was an American aviator, photographer, curator and professor. After receiving her pilot's license as a teenager, she enrolled as a WASP pilot during World War II, flying missions in 1943 and 1944. Following her time as a pilot, she returned to school to study art and photography. The photographs she subsequently made, documenting how women age, received wide recognition and are held in numerous museum collections. She taught art at the University of New Mexico from 1980 to 1994, and was awarded a Guggenheim fellowship in 1992.

== Early life ==
Noggle was born in Evanston, Illinois, in 1922, and died in Albuquerque, New Mexico on August 16, 2005. Her sister was Mary N. Pease (1918 - 2004). As a teenager, she set a goal of becoming a pilot after seeing Amelia Earhart at an air show in Chicago. When she was 17, her mother, a bookstore manager, agreed to let her take flying lessons, and she received her pilot license that year.

== World War II pilot ==
At 21, Noggle traveled to Sweetwater, Texas, to train to become a Women Airforce Service Pilots (WASP). She graduated in the class of 44-W-1, and flew missions in 1943 and 1944. The WASP were disbanded in late 1944. After the war, she became a crop-duster in the Southwest and flew stunts in an aerial circus.

When the Air Force offered commissions to former WASPs after the war, she applied and was a pilot during the Korean War. She retired as a captain in 1959 when she developed emphysema. She later described her aviation career this way: "I flew airplanes for a living for eleven years and 6,000 hours . . . When I was twenty-five I became a stunt pilot with an air show; when I was twenty-six I became a crop-duster pilot."

== Photography career ==
Following her aviation career, Noggle went back to school at the University of New Mexico, earning a bachelor's degree in fine art in 1966 and a master's degree in art in 1969. Influenced by female photographers such as Julia Margaret Cameron and Diane Arbus, Noggle's work mainly focused on the aging process of women, a subject which she referred to as "the saga of the fallen flesh". She said of the process: "I like older faces, not because of aging itself, but rather the look of the face, the revelation of life, and the conflict between what was and what they are now. That interests me, not the idea of aging itself." Using humor and pathos to depict the women she photographed, Noggle photographed her subjects in a way that displayed both femininity and sexual energy. Her ability to find beauty using bizarre subject matter typified her career as a photographer.

Noggle was 48 when she had her first one-woman show, at a gallery in Taos, New Mexico, in 1970. Her best known series of photographs was taken in 1975, when she photographed herself after receiving a facelift.

She later became the Curator of Photography at the New Mexico Museum of Art, from 1970 to 1976. In 1975 Noggle co-curated an exhibition and catalog for the San Francisco Museum of Art, Women of Photography: An Historical Survey. This exhibition was credited with introducing the work of American women photographers to a broader audience. Noggle taught as an adjunct professor of Art at the University of New Mexico from 1970 to 1984.

== Awards ==
The University of New Mexico awarded her an honorary doctorate in 1991. She was awarded the John Simon Guggenheim Memorial fellowship in 1982.

== Legacy ==
The Harn Museum at the University of Florida presented an exhibition of Noggle's photographs from June 26, 2012 to March 10, 2013. Its title was Anne Noggle: Reality and the Blind Eye of Truth. The New Mexico PBS series, ¡Colores!, featured Noggle in an episode filmed during her lifetime. In 2016 the New Mexico Museum of Art, her former employer, honored her with her a solo exhibition.

Noggle's work is in the permanent collections of several art museums and universities, including the New Mexico Museum of Art, Albuquerque Museum, California Museum of Photography, Denver Art Museum, Minneapolis Institute of the Arts, the National Gallery of Canada and the San Francisco Museum of Modern Art.

Noggle's personal archive, which includes exhibition and work prints, contact sheets, negatives, correspondence, clippings, albums, handwritten and typed manuscripts, and book dummies, is located at the Harry Ransom Center.

== Books ==
Her 1983 book Silver Lining contained photographs documenting the challenges she and other women in America faced as they grew older.

She made portraits of her fellow WASPs as older women in the book For God, Country and the Thrill of It: Women Airforce Service Pilots in World War II (1990).

A Dance with Death, telling the story of the Soviet airwomen of World War II, was published in 1994. Noggle had traveled to the Soviet Union to photograph and record the stories of these women.
