= Creative Camera =

Photography magazine

- Cover of the January 1974 edition of Creative Camera featuring photography by Paddy Summerfield
- Editor: David Brittain
- Former editors: Peter Turner
- Frequency: Monthly; Bi-monthly
- Format: A4 stapled
- Publisher: Coo Press
- Founder: Sylvester Stein (as Camera Owner), Colin Osman (as Creative Camera)
- Founded: 1968
- First issue: February 1, 1968; 58 years ago
- Final issue Number: March 31, 2000 no. 362, Feb./Mar. 2000
- Country: United Kingdom
- Based in: London
- Language: English
- ISSN: 0011-0876
- OCLC: 613320302

Creative Camera (also known as "CC") was a British monthly/bi-monthly magazine devoted to fine art photography and documentary photography. The successor to the very different (hobbyist) magazine Camera Owner (which had started in 1964), Creative Camera was published in England between 1968 and 2000, and was the forerunner of the short-lived DPICT (2000-2001).

== Background ==
The origin of Creative Camera was Camera Owner, subtitled 'the teach-yourself photo monthly' first published by Sylvester Stein in June 1964 and which was edited, from Issue #10, in April 1965, by another South African Jurgen Schadeberg, a photojournalist who had worked with Tom Hopkinson and as picture editor of Drum magazine. He instituted a stronger cover design and integrated pictures more prominently into the internal layout.

Bill Jay, whose articles featured in the July 1965 Camera Owner, took over editorship in November of the following year. The publishers Davpet Ltd. announced that the magazine was folding. In May 1966 Colin Osman (August 16, 1926–April 12, 2001), publisher of Coo Press that produced The Racing Pigeon founded by his grandfather Lieutenant Colonel Alfred Henry Osman (responsible for pigeon training and organisation during World War One) with tens of thousands of subscribers, purchased Camera Owner for £1. Osman's father William had recruited two thousand amateur pigeon fanciers to provide birds for a Special Continental Pigeon Service, MI14(d), a branch of Military Intelligence (MI16) in WW2.

== Editorship ==
Jay gradually exchanged Camera Owner's audience of camera club members for more serious photographers and photojournalists; by 1966 book reviews had begun to be included in the contents (for example, John Szarkowski's The Photographer's Eye, July 1967) with interviews (including Aaron Siskind and David Douglas Duncan) highlighting aesthetics, rather than merely technique; in 1967 Jay added 'Creative', in a smaller font, to the title 'Camera Owner'; and by December substituted a smaller type size for 'Owner' so that the words 'Creative Camera' dominated the masthead. The magazine encouraged its readers to set up 'postal circles' by circulating around a boxed print for feedback.

In February 1968 the journal became Creative Camera, with a distinctive wide-bordered silver cover featuring a centred monochrome image, in contrast to Camera Owner's full colour, the black-and-white photograph being the medium of serious art and street photography, and some documentary work, of the period. Picture spreads, with usually a full page devoted to each image, were separated form articles that included press releases, editorial and opinion pieces, and British and international commentators' responses to developments in photography and current exhibitions.

Jay was paid little for his editorship and supported the position with lectures to camera clubs, part-time teaching at Harrow, Croydon and the London College of Printing and, with Osman, conducted four-guinea two-day photography workshops for hobbyists at an Essex retreat. He is remembered by Martin Parr, then a student at Manchester Polytechnic, as 'generating enormous excitement with missionary zeal'. Jay as early 1969 was courting Arts Council funding for the magazine.

Jay left after differences with Osman in December 1969 to set up a short lived high-production periodical Album (1970–1971), and in January 1970 Colin Osman, drawing on his photo-historical interests and amateur photography, became editor. He was joined by Peter Turner, first as Assistant Editor and then as Co-Editor. Turner, like Jay who suggested he take the job, had studied photography at the Guildford School of Art (1965–1968) before becoming a journalist for SLR magazine.

At its original location at his grandfather's house at 19 Doughty Street Osman established a gallery, bookstore run by his wife and sister-in-law and a book-order company specialising in the photographers featured in the publication. When it purchased Mansfield Books International its mail-order business expanded such that it rivalled the largest book holdings in photography of the late 1960s and early 1970s. In addition to the magazine, Creative Camera published five hardbound Yearbooks over 1975 to 1979. Turner remembered;

There were no photography galleries in England then so Creative Camera was the only outlet. An endless stream of people with interesting pictures came into the office. The magazine was the centre of things. It was terrific!

Turner left in 1978, and was replaced by Judy Goldhill. In 1980 the magazine was issued bi-monthly to save money but was back to monthly after the April/May 1981 issue, but with texts integrated with the imagery. Replacing Mark Holborn, who was the first editor appointed by the board, Susan Butler was coeditor from 1984 to 1986. Turner became editor again in 1986, on the occasion of Osman's sale of the magazine. Turner resigned in 1991 and David Brittain took over.

== Ideas and legacy ==
The magazine, into the 1970s, was a magazine by practitioners for practitioners, with an ethos shaped by Henri Cartier Bresson's aesthetic of 'the decisive moment,' particularly as it related to radical street photography such as that by Tony Ray-Jones. This was later modulated by the theories of John Tagg and John Szarkowski about visual representation of societal structures, with motifs and motivations subsequently analysed in applications of deconstruction and semiotics from Victor Burgin's Thinking Photography (1982) and Michel Foucault's and Roland Barthes' philosophies. Burgin's conceptual photography and writings raised the consciousness of a new generation of artists who also responded to greater immigration into England by addressing and critiquing Britain's colonial roots, and gave prominence to artists like Nigerian Rotimi Fani-Kayode, and Uganda-born Zarina Bhimji.

These changes in social politics took effect in the magazine by 1986, when Colin Osman resigned to make way for full revenue support by the Arts Council of Great Britain and the transfer of editorial decisions to a board of directors so that, while inclusive of traditionalists represented by Gerry Badger, Colin Osman and Peter Turner, perspectives introduced by members Ian Jeffrey, Jo Spence, Rebecca Solnit, Geoffrey Batchen and others in the 1990s brought Creative Camera's critical and intellectual content in line with more general art world publications.

Creative Camera continued to provide an open forum on what best represented British art photography; Mark Durden's February/March 1998 article "Defining the Moment" asserted that the publication was still true to British photographic traditions; and exhibitions such as the Victoria and Albert's British Photography: into the 1990s (1988) and Museum of Modern Art's British Photography from the Thatcher Years (1990) attested to Creative Camera’s participation in attempts to decipher the question. Susan Butler saw the use of colour in the 1990s, renewed with attention to the example of William Eggleston, as reforming documentary work in response. Photography critic and professor David Green in a series of articles explored and attempted to define how conceptual and multimedia practice and theory stood in relation to ever more diverse and mercurial 'straight' art photography.

Artworks provided visual commentary on the ideological and textual content. In 1990, the photographers Henry Bond and Richard Burbridge guest edited a double issue showcasing emerging British photographers—"The New New" issue, October–November. The selection they made included the first published examples of photo-based artworks by Sarah Lucas, Damien Hirst and Angus Fairhurst. Bond's collaboration with the magazine continued as an ongoing series of artists' pages that ran as "openers"—appearing on the inside front cover and contents page. One spread, created by Hirst, depicted the mutilated corpse of a young man with wounds to the eyes, and was captioned Damien Hirst: Fig. 60 Self-inflicted injuries...; another introduced Fairhurst's self-portrait Man Abandoned by Colour.

A compilation of articles Creative Camera: Thirty Years of Writing edited and published in 1999 by Brittain, provides a survey of significant British perspectives on what constituted 'art photography', on the succession of movements and surrounding theory, the rise and prominence of certain practitioners, the question of social use, and changes in technology that had been debated in the pages of the magazine over its three decades.

== DPICT ==
In response to emerging digital imaging technologies, Brittain changed the name to DPICT in January 2000.

The magazine folded eighteen months later.

== Influence ==
In a May 1977 interview Helmut Gernsheim noted the tendency for young European photographers to look toward America as the source of contemporary and avant-garde imagery, while Americans remained ignorant of European developments of "new objectivity, of photojournalism, fotoform, and subjective photography", with "only Creative Camera, being in English...seen in the United States" to counteract the tendency.

Thirty years later, Amanda Hopkinson, writing in The Guardian, described Creative Camera as "radical and art-focused"; an "immensely influential magazine".
