= Peter Turner (writer and photographer) =

Writer and photographer (1947–2005)

Peter Turner (3 February 1947 – 1 August 2005) was a photographer, curator, and writer. He was the longest-serving editor of Creative Camera.

== Early life and education ==
Turner was born in London on 3 February 1947. He studied photography at Guildford School of Art (now University for the Creative Arts) between 1965 and 1968. (Note: David Brittain's obituary for Afterimage Journal is reproduced by Roy Hammans at http://www.fine-photographs.co.uk/)

== Life and work ==
He began working at SLR magazine where he learned the journalist's trade and encountered Creative Camera. In 1969, following the departure of founding editor Bill Jay, Turner became assistant editor to Creative Camera's founder and publisher, Colin Osman. David Brittain, writing in Afterimage Journal, said "Over the next nine years Creative Camera became a pillar of the support structure for photography in the United Kingdom and a byword for good taste". He left Creative Camera in 1978 to set up with his partner, Heather Forbes, the short-lived photographic publisher Travelling Light in 1980 in Putney. Its publications included the first edition of Chris Steele-Perkins' The Teds. In 1986, with Travelling Light in financial difficulties, Turner returned to Creative Camera as editor, welcoming colour photography ("by championing younger documentarists such as Paul Graham, Martin Parr, Paul Seawright, Anna Fox, and emerging transcendental formalists including Peter Fraser") and tolerating the photographic work of "fine artists".

Turner curated photography exhibitions for the Arts Council of Great Britain, the Barbican Art Gallery, London (notably American Images: Photography 1945 to 1980 in 1985, with John Benton-Harris) and the Museum of Modern Art, Oxford. He edited a number of photography books and his own photography was exhibited in the Side Gallery in Newcastle.

In 1991, Turner left Creative Camera and Britain, moving with Forbes to New Zealand. He taught at the Wellington School of Design (Note: The Wellington School of Design is a predecessor of the College of Creative Arts within Massey University. "Merger with Wellington Polytechnic", Massey University. Retrieved 27 January 2014.) and wrote for The New Zealand Journal of Photography.

After suffering from multiple sclerosis, he died in Wellington on 1 August 2005.

== Legacy ==
Paul Hill writes that Turner "will always be remembered for the 'creative years' of Creative Camera".

In 2008 the School of Fine Arts at the College of Creative Arts, Massey University, Wellington, New Zealand established the annual Peter Turner Memorial Lecture and Peter Turner Memorial Scholarship in memory of Turner. The lecture "brings an internationally significant photographic historian, theorist or artist to Wellington to deliver the lecture". The scholarship is "awarded once each year to an exceptional candidate wishing to advance their photographic work through a period of postgraduate study".

== Publications ==
- P. H. Emerson: Photographer of Norfolk. Godine Photographic Monographs 2. Boston: Godine, 1974. Gordon Fraser Photographic Monographs 2. London: Gordon Fraser, 1974. ISBN 0-87923-106-8. With Richard Wood. On P. H. Emerson.
- Other Eyes: An Exhibition of Photographs Taken in the British Isles. London: Arts Council of Great Britain, 1976. ISBN 0-7287-0102-2.
- American Images 1945–1980. Harmondsworth: Penguin, 1985. ISBN 0-14-007988-2. New York: Viking, 1985. ISBN 0-670-80619-6.
- The History of Photography. Twickenham: Hamlyn, 1987. ISBN 0-600-50270-8. Twickenham: Hamlyn, 1988. ISBN 0-600-56114-3. New York: Exeter, 1987. ISBN 0-671-08923-4. Greenwich: Brompton, 1990. ISBN 0-86124-312-9.
- Photo Texts. London: Travelling Light, 1988. ISBN 0-906333-22-9. With Gerry Badger. Essays.
- Photography and Paradox. Wellington: New Zealand Centre for Photography, 1999. ISBN 0-473-05799-9. Essays.
