= Van Deren Coke =

American art historian

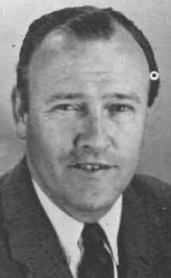
- Coke in 1964
- Born: Frank Van Deren Coke; July 4, 1921; Lexington, Kentucky
- Died: July 11, 2004 (aged 83); Albuquerque, New Mexico
- Resting place: Santa Fe National Cemetery
- Education: University of Kentucky; Indiana University; Harvard University
- Known for: Photography
- Spouse(s): Eleanor Coke (died 1984); Joan Gillberry Coke
- Children: Eleanor Browning Coke; Stirling Coke
- Awards: 1975 Guggenheim Fellowship; 1989 Fulbright Fellowship

Frank Van Deren Coke, F. Van Deren Coke, or Van Deren Coke (July 4, 1921 – July 11, 2004) was an American photographer, scholar and museum professional. He was born in Lexington, Kentucky, and died in Albuquerque, New Mexico.

== Early career ==
Coke's introduction to photography began as a practicing photographer. He studied with Nicholas Haz at the Clarence H. White School of Photography and later with Ansel Adams. He had his first exhibition at the University of Kentucky in 1940 while he was there studying history and art history.

== Museum jobs ==
Coke was the founding director of the University of New Mexico Art Museum from 1962 to 1970. In 1970—during Beaumont Newhall's final year—he served as Deputy Director and from 1971 to 1972 as Director of the George Eastman Museum (then George Eastman House). From 1979 to 1987 he was director of the San Francisco Museum of Modern Art's photography department.

== Notable publications ==
- Taos and Santa Fe : The Artists Environment, 1882-1942. OCLC 833769.
- The Painter and the Photograph : From Delacroix to Warhol. OCLC 256243099.
- Nordfeldt The Painter. OCLC 186959898.
- Andrew Dasburg. OCLC 5102073.
- Coke, Van Deren (1979). Photography in New Mexico : from the daguerreotype to the present. University of New Mexico Press. ISBN 9780826304957. OCLC 4494710.
