= John Goto =

British photographic artist (1949–2023)

John Glithero (11 February 1949 – 2 August 2023), better known as John Goto, was a British photographic artist. His work addresses a range of historical, cultural and socio-political subject areas, often using a satirical approach.

== Biography ==
John Glithero was born in Stockport on 11 February 1949. As an artist, he adopted the name John Goto which was inspired by Walerian Borowczyk's first feature film Goto, Island of Love (1968). His first one-man exhibition, Goto, Photographs 1971-81, was held at The Photographer's Gallery in London in 1981. Other solo shows include Terezin, at the Raab Gallery, Berlin, in 1988; The Scar, Manchester City Museum and Art Gallery, 1993; The Commissar of Space, Modern Art, Oxford, 1998; Loss of Face, Tate Britain, London, 2002; High Summer, The British Academy, London, 2005; and Dreams of Jelly Roll, Freud Museum, London, 2012.

Goto was Artist-in-Residence at Kettle's Yard, University of Cambridge, 1988-9.

Goto's books include Ukadia, published to coincide with a solo exhibition at Djanogly Art Gallery, Nottingham, 2003, and Lovers Rock, which is a series of portraits made in 1977 by Goto of young British Afro-Caribbeans.

In 2007, the Telegraph listed Goto as one of the top 100 living geniuses.

Goto died on 2 August 2023, at the age of 74.
