= Guildford School of Art =

Former art school in Surrey, England

Coordinates: 51.216°N 0.806°W

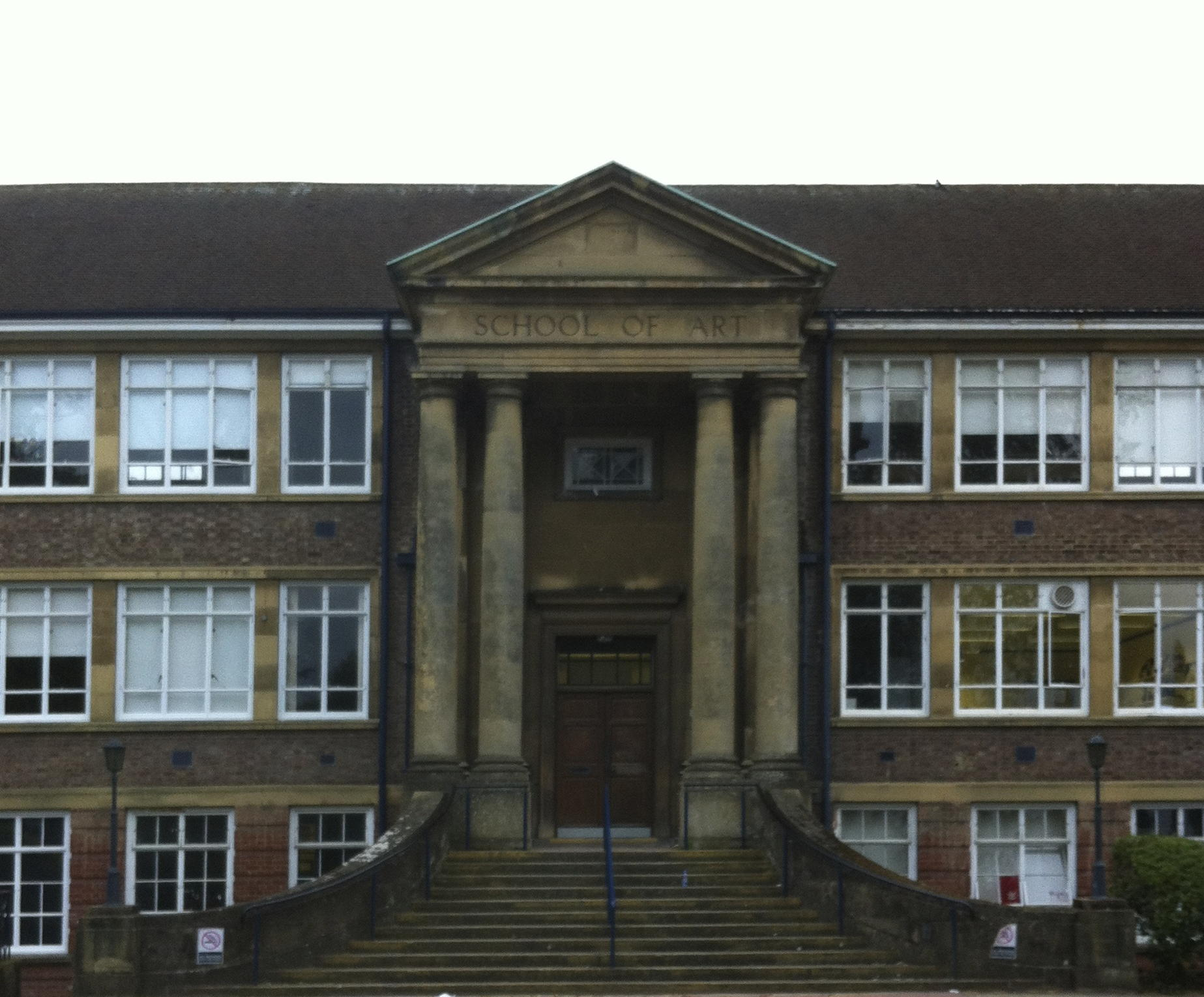
Portal of Guildford School of Art

Guildford School of Art was formed in 1856 as Guildford Working Men's Institution and was one of several schools of art run by Surrey County Council. After several mergers with tertiary art institutions it became part of the University for the Creative Arts in 2008.

== Background ==
Before 1900 Britain was famous for its Arts and Crafts movement, a style of architecture and interior design practiced at the then School of Art, and which was influential on western design leading up to Modernism, the latter propounded in the German Bauhaus, particularly their use of a "Preliminary" course to change students' basic thinking. That was widely replicated in British art schools as a "Foundation" course. After World War II the British Government realized that British design was less popular than American or Swiss design.

== History ==
The Guildford Working Men's Institute was a successor to the Guildford Institute which itself was formed on 14 June 1843 out of a union of the Mechanics' Institute founded in 1834 and the Literary and Scientific Institution, founded in 1835. By 1859 the Institute had 541 students. In 1892 the Guildford Institute and the Guildford Working Men's Institution were amalgamated under the title of the Guildford and Working Men's Institution offering both technical and art classes. The Guildford Institute and the Science, Art and Technical classes run by Surrey County Council separated in 1910. In 1939, the institution, then known as the School of Art, moved into Stoke Park Mansion.

For many years after WW-I the school enjoyed a reputation as a major centre of photographic excellence under the Head of Photography, Ifor Thomas. Among his students were Jane Bown, John Hedgecoe, John Cleare, and Ray Dean. Staff included Thurston Hopkins.. The fame of the photography department was such that in 1957 the School was referred to as "Guildford School of Art and Photography". That year, students' work Portrait of a Town featuring the people and buildings of Guildford, was shown at the Royal Institute of British Architects in London. The School also had a well-regarded complementary studies department headed by a fine artist and with many art historians, broadcast scriptwriters and published authors on the staff who taught students to think critically about the world around them. Alan Coleman, a sculptor, who had studied at Goldsmiths' College School of Art and the Royal College of Art, was Principal of Guildford School of Art from 1956 - 65.

In 1966 the school was inspected by the Summerson committee on behalf of the National Council for Diplomas in Art and Design (NCDAD) which was charged with deciding which art schools were capable of awarding degree-equivalent Diplomas in Art and Design. The committee concluded that Guildford School of Art would not be accredited to offer the Diplomas. Surrey County Council invited Professor Lewis Elton of the University of Surrey to assess the school independently. Elton reached the same conclusion as the Summerson committee. Surrey County Council then decided that the School would award a "Guildford Diploma". Students protested in 1968 about the quality of education at the School. A large number of the staff were dismissed.

In 1969 the School merged with Farnham College of Art to become the West Surrey College of Art and Design. The Epsom School of Art & Design and West Surrey College of Art & Design merged to form Surrey Institute of Art & Design in 1995. The Kent Institute of Art & Design and Surrey Institute of Art & Design and University College merged to form University College for the Creative Arts at Canterbury, Epsom, Farnham, Maidstone & Rochester in 2005. The University College for the Creative Arts at Canterbury, Epsom, Farnham, Maidstone & Rochester received its University Title from the Privy Council and was renamed the University for the Creative Arts in 2008.

== Student unrest and staff dismissals ==
In 1968 student unrest began in response to underfunding, quality and qualifications of teachers, dissatisfaction with the principal, ceramicist Tom Arnold, and certification of graduate qualifications; the school offered a "Guildford Diploma", falsely believed to be a degree-level qualification. A 1969 brochure for 3D Design Dept. at Pewley described the Interior Design Dept. as offering a (WSCAD student 69–71) qualification affiliated to RIBA. Against a background of a period of student protest across Europe and America, students held a 'sit-in'. On 5 June the students occupied the refectory and spent many days writing a proposal to the principal Tom Arnold demanding changes. The proposal was backed by a majority of the staff, the students' parents and many eminent artists. Jack Straw, the newly elected President of the National Union of Students (NUS) and later Foreign Secretary visited the School and tried to persuade the students to end their protest. The support for the Guildford students by the NUS was limited but Straw would later help to raise the issue in the press.

As Tom Arnold was unable to contain the protest and end the sit-in, the Governors began issuing writs to the striking students on 11 June. Tom Arnold approached the students and offered to set up departmental panels to resolve the issue but students rejected the proposal.

On 3 July the staff held a meeting at an hotel near the School. The School Registrar accompanied by police entered uninvited and handed them writs requiring them to appear before a Judge on Monday 8 July. On 6 July the students locked the building and Council representatives shouted at them through a loudhailer to leave by 11:30. SCC sent letters to thirty four students warning them of consequences if they stayed. The students stayed. Questions began to be asked in the House of Commons. On 9 July a letter from a number of noted academic. writers and artists including David Hockney was published in the Times. It was the first of many and would eventually lead to the collapse of SCC's case and a Public Enquiry.

On 14 July the Chairman of the Governors offered to rescind the students' suspension if the students agreed to leave. The students stayed. SCC went to the High Court and asked for a temporary order that twenty nine of the students leave the School. It was refused because the request had not been made by the entire Council (many councillors were on holiday). All SCC members were recalled. On 29 July, after an eight-week sit-in, the students left the building. On 30 July Tony Heath asked amidst shouting how much ratepayers money had been spent on hiring security guards. He praised the students some of whom cheered him from the public gallery. The security guard company "Interstate Security" was an "off-the-shelf" company which was quickly wound up. The school reopened in the autumn of 1968.

A Select Committee enquiry was eventually launched in 1970 and the vice-Principal Bernard Brett, was dismissed. The Principal Tom Arnold became head of the united Guildford and Farnham Schools of Art.

Twenty-eight part-time teachers, including eight from the Complementary Studies department who had been teaching in the school since 1951, including its Head, John Kashdan, were informed on 8 August that their contracts would not be renewed, removing almost all Complementary Studies and Foundation Departments' teachers. Many were members of the Association of Teachers in Technical Institutions (ATTI). On 10 August, Eric Moonman MP for Billericay, made the first of what would become many appeals to the Education Secretary Edward Short to hold a public enquiry into the School.

On 14 August the Governors suspended seven of the Complementary Studies staff aligned with the students. A week later, students' parents formed their own committee to pressurize the SCC. Their leader Mr Colin Ferguson said "The students have been baulked at every step. They have behaved in an extremely democratic and constitutional way". The next day the Governors closed the building, but the students stayed in. The Governors installed security guards who having talked to the students, sided with them. One of the guards, James Teelan, said "We have just about had enough. The students are law-abiding citizens and are doing no harm … Our sympathies are now wholly with the students. They are causing no trouble … From what I can gather, the firm's idea was to build up the force of security men gradually and without the students suspecting, so that they could be ousted. I could not bring myself to be part of it". Councillor Tony Heath also sided with the students. Hampshire County Council, having withdrawn a £9-a-week grant from a student, Sally Williams, at the request of SCC, realized this might be illegal and restituted it. Fifty parents asked the Governors not to victimise students or staff. The Governors brought an injunction against the security guards and cut off the electricity to the college. The students hired a generator and remained on the premises.

On 16 August the ATTI echoed Moonman's appeal to Short. Short refused, but by 22 August the SCC realised that were the ATTI to boycott them, recruiting new staff to replace the forty-two dismissed staff would render them liable to union action. SCC then agreed to discuss the sackings in September. SCC had claimed that the sackings were due only to the need for economies but started to advertise for new staff in the Photographic department. By 19 September SCC were talking of an offer of compensation to the seven full-time staff who had been sacked. The School reopened but a student was told to stay away by SCC. Her parents were members of the parents association which had opposed the Governors and SCC. Tom Arnold reinstated her. SCC employed twenty-five new staff, none of whom was a member of the ATTI. In October the Guildford Trades Council added their voice to the growing demand for a public enquiry. By 12 October with the confirmation of the dismissal of the seven full-time staff by SCC, Jack Straw added to the call for a public enquiry. Sir John Summerson, chairman of the National Council for Diplomas in Art and Design found the decision to sack the staff "deplorable". By November the ATTI had blacklisted Guildford School of Art and was threatening to blacklist all other art establishments under SCC control. 50 students started a 24-hour sit-in at Guildford School of Art in protest against the way it was reorganised and being run and demanded the reinstatement of the sacked staff. Tom Arnold met 130 parents of students but did not answer their questions about the staff sackings, the sit-in or the restructuring of the School.

On 12 December 5 members of the Select Committee on Education and Science started their own enquiry led by Christopher Price MP. The questions elicited the history of friction at Guildford School of Art and the secrecy surrounding the amalgamation with Farnham School of Art.

The sacked staff held an exhibition at the Royal Institute Galleries Piccadilly from 30 December 1968 to 9 January 1969 which John Lennon and Yoko Ono attended.

On the anniversary of the original sit-in, fifty students staged another. The Liberal Party called for a public enquiry and in October 1969, the Select Committee reported that there was indeed a "prima facie case for a public enquiry at Guildford School of Art". SCC immediately rejected the call. On the second anniversary of the sit-in, Moonman again called for a public enquiry, and was supported in a letter to The Times signed by David Hockney, Peter Sellers, C Day Lewis and many other noted artists, writers, politicians and academics. In September the dispute was referred to the Department of Employment.

In May 1971, Henry Moore, Shirley Williams and others wrote to The Times asking for the Secretary of State for Science and Education to intervene in an effort to resolve the long-standing dispute. By mid-June 1971 there was a sign of a thaw: SCC agreed to discuss compensation with the ATTI and an agreement was reached by the end of June. Seven full-time lecturers were to be re-employed by Surrey County Council.

In 1974 Tom Arnold left the UK to live in Australia.

== Notable former staff and students ==
- Heda Armour
- Jane Bown
- John Cleare
- Raymond Dean (photographer)
- John Hedgecoe
- Thurston Hopkins
- John Kashdan
- Alfred Lammer
- William Matthews
- Daniel Miller
- Paddy Summerfield
- Peter Turner
- Gerald Wilson
