= David Hurn =

Welsh photographer (born 1934)

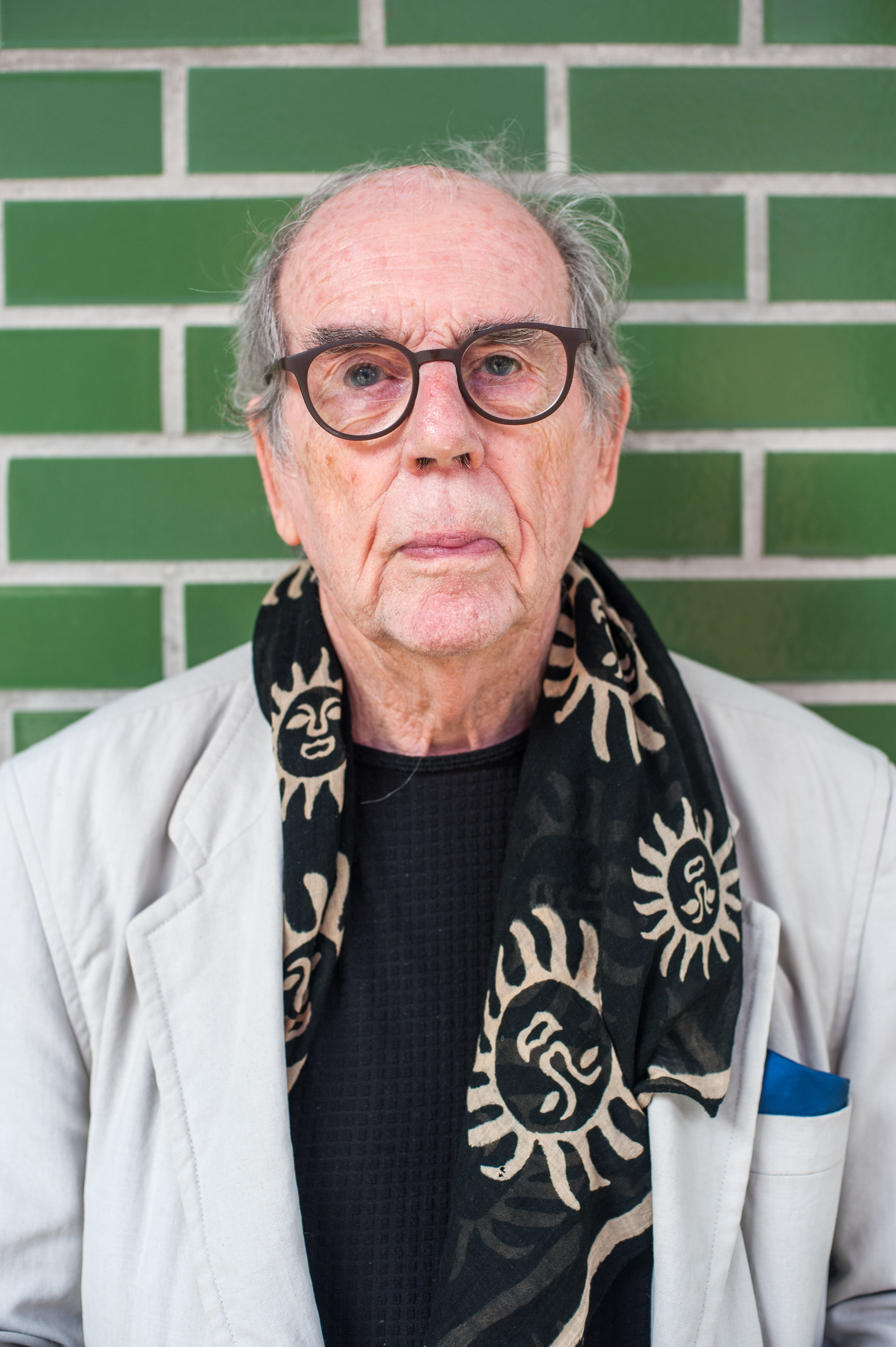
- Hurn in 2018
- Born: 1934 (age 91–92); Redhill, Surrey, England
- Occupation: Documentary photographer

David Hurn (born 1934) is a Welsh documentary photographer and member of Magnum Photos, who lives in South Wales.

== Early life and education ==
Hurn was born in 1934 in Redhill, Surrey, England. He is of Welsh descent and was raised in Cardiff, Wales. Because of his dyslexia he joined the school camera club.

== Life and work ==
After leaving school, Hurn moved to London, hoping to become a photographer. Self-taught, he began his career in 1955 when he worked for Reflex Agency. He gained his reputation as a photojournalist for his documentation of the Hungarian revolution of 1956, and is featured in two of Ken Russell's films for the Monitor television arts' series, A House in Bayswater (1960), and Watch the Birdie (1963). In 1965 he became associated with Magnum Photos and became a full member in 1967.

In 1963, Hurn was commissioned by the producers of the James Bond films to shoot a series of stills with Sean Connery and the actresses of From Russia with Love. When the theatrical property Walther PPK pistol didn't arrive, Hurn volunteered the use of his own Walther LP-53 air pistol. The pistol became a symbol of James Bond on many film posters of the series.

In 1967 Dino de Laurentiis asked Hurn to travel to Rome to shoot photos of Jane Fonda in Barbarella.

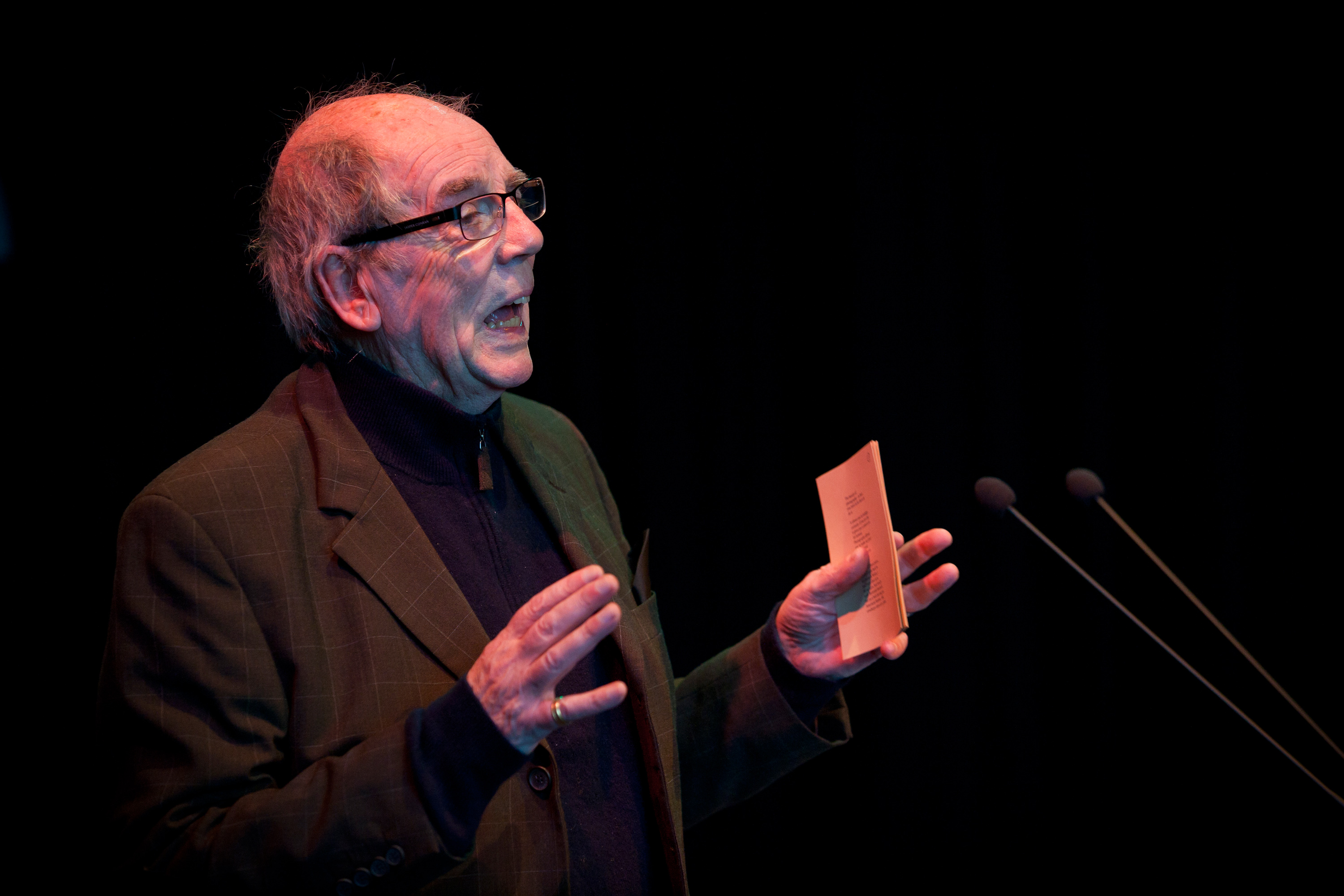
Hurn discussing Democracy in Action in Wales; 2012

Hurn returned to Wales in the late 1960s, initially living in a van for a year photographing the country. In 1973 he set up the School of Documentary Photography in Newport, Wales. Eventually, he turned away from documentary and photojournalism, bringing a more personal approach to his image making. He says, "There are many forms of photography. I consider myself simply a recorder of that which I find of interest around me. I personally have no desire to create or stage direct ideas." His book, Wales: Land of My Father (2000), illustrates the traditional and the modern aspects of Wales. He continues to live and work in Wales.

Hurn has been an avid collector of photography. He built his private collection of other peoples' work by swapping prints with them. In 2017, he donated 1500 of his photographs, and 700 of other peoples' photographs—including Henri Cartier-Bresson, Eve Arnold, and Bill Brandt—to Amgueddfa Cymru – Museum Wales. National Museum Cardiff held an exhibition of this collection of other peoples' photographs in 2017/2018, entitled Swaps: Photographs from the David Hurn Collection.

== Personal life ==
Hurn was married from 1964 to 1971 to American actress Alita Naughton (1942–2019), best known for her role in Ken Russell's French Dressing (1964); they had a daughter, Sian.

In 2001 he was diagnosed with colon cancer but made a full recovery.

He lives in Tintern, Monmouthshire.

== Publications ==
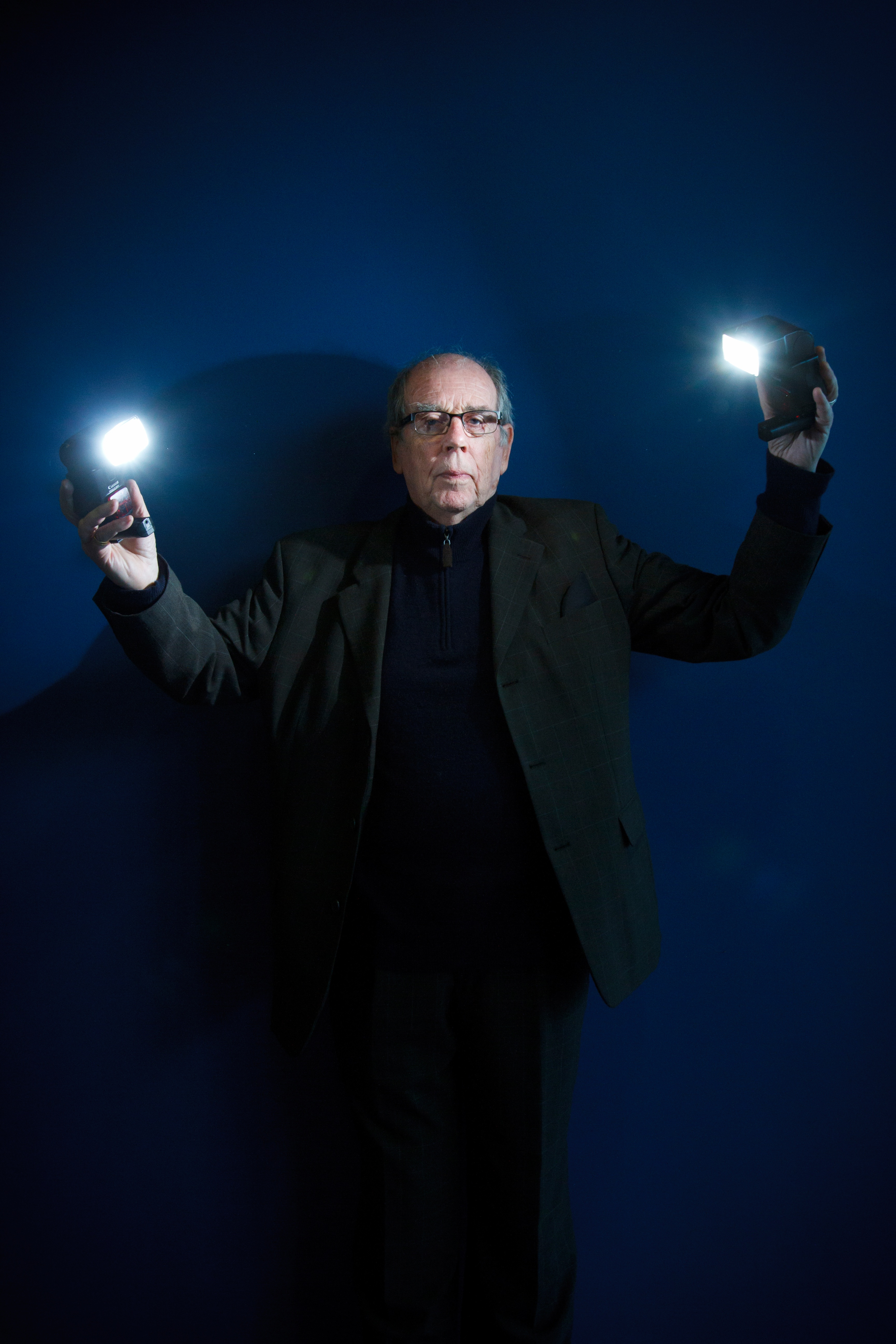
Hurn in 2012

=== Publications by Hurn ===
- David Hurn: Photographs 1956-1976. London: Arts Council of Great Britain, 1979. ISBN 978-0-7287-0202-8.
- Wales: Land of My Father. London: Thames & Hudson, 2000. ISBN 978-0-500-01983-2.
- Living in Wales. Bridgend: Seren, 2003. ISBN 978-1-85411-339-9.
- Rebirth of a Capital. Cardiff: Cardiff County Council, 2005. ISBN 978-0-902466-22-7.
- Writing the Picture. Bridgend: Seren, 2010. ISBN 978-1854115317.
- The 1960s Photographed by David Hurn. London: Reel Art Press, 2015. ISBN 978-1909526136.
- Arizona Trips. London: Reel Art, 2017. Photographs by Hurn. ISBN 978-1-909526-51-8. Edited by Tony Nourmand. Foreword by Christopher Frayling.
- On Instagram. London: Reel Art, 2024. ISBN 9781909526945.
- On Reading. Bristol: RRB, 2024. ISBN 9781738516384.

=== Zines by Hurn ===
- California. Southport: Café Royal, 2017. Edition of 200 copies. (Note: Café Royal's page about California is here.)
- Wales 1970s. Southport: Café Royal, 2017. Edition of 200 copies. (Note: Café Royal's page about Wales 1970s is here.)
- Wales 1990s. Southport: Café Royal, 2017. Edition of 200 copies. (Note: Café Royal's page about Wales 1990s is here.)
- Wales 2010s. Southport: Café Royal, 2018. Edition of 200 copies. (Note: Café Royal's page about Wales 2010s is here.)

=== Publications with others ===
- On Being a Photographer: a Practical Guide. Photography & the Creative Process: a Series by LensWork Publishing. Anacortes, WA: Lenswork Publishing, 1997. ISBN 978-1-888803-06-8. With Bill Jay. And subsequent editions.
- On Looking at Photographs: A Practical Guide. Anacortes, WA: Lenswork Publishing, 2000. ISBN 978-1-888803-09-9. With Bill Jay.

== Awards ==
- 1979/80: UK/USA Bicentennial Fellowship
- 2016: Honorary Fellowship of the Royal Photographic Society
- 2021: Lucie Awards, New York, Achievement in Documentary

== Exhibitions ==
- 2014: Land of My Father, Multimedia Art Museum, Moscow, 2014. Part of the Britain in Focus theme of Photobiennale 2014, the UK-Russia Year of Culture.
- 2017: 44 Mile Radius, Tilt & Shift Gallery, Llanrwst, Wales, 2017. Photographs made by Hurn within a 44-mile radius of Llanrwst.

== TV programs about Hurn ==
- He appears in A House in Bayswater (1960). Currently on Iplayer in BBC Archive.
- David Hurn: A Life in Pictures. 40 minutes. BBC, 2017.

== Collections ==
Hurn's work is held in the following permanent collections:

- British Council, London
- Amgueddfa Cymru – National Museum Wales
