= Bill Jay =

British photographer and writer (1940–2009)

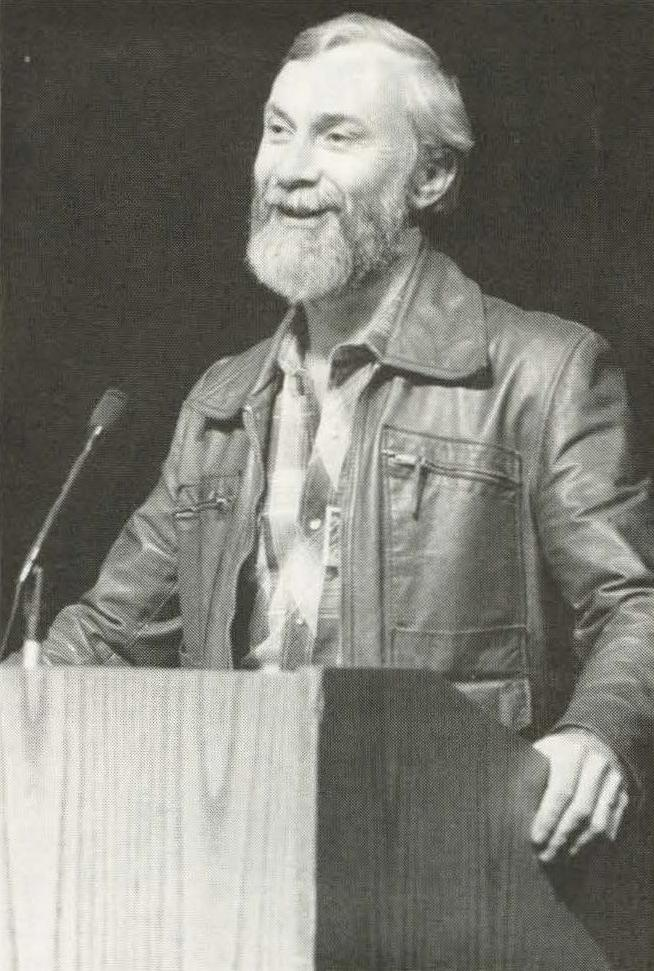
- Jay in 1986
- Born: 12 August 1940; Maidenhead, England
- Died: 10 May 2009 (aged 68)
- Education: Berkshire College of Art; University of New Mexico (MA)
- Occupations: Photographer and writer
- Website: billjayonphotography.com (archived 28 June 2011)

William Jay (12 August 1940 – 10 May 2009) was a photographer, writer on and advocate of photography, curator, magazine and picture editor, lecturer, public speaker and mentor. He was the first editor of "the immensely influential magazine" Creative Camera (1968–1969); and founder and editor of Album (1970–1971). He is the author of more than 20 books on the history and criticism of photography, and roughly 400 essays, lectures and articles. His own photographs have been widely published, including a solo exhibition at the San Francisco Museum of Modern Art. He is known for his portrait photographs of photographers.

== Life and work ==
Jay was born in Maidenhead, England, on 12 August 1940. He attended grammar school and completed two years at Berkshire College of Art.

Jay was editor of the hobbyist Camera Owner which he transformed into "the immensely influential magazine" Creative Camera (1968–1969); and founder and editor of Album (1970–1971), for all twelve issues. To supplement working on Creative Camera, for short periods he was European manager of Globe Photos, an international picture agency, and picture editor of The Daily Telegraph Magazine. He was the first Director of Photography at the Institute of Contemporary Arts (ICA) in London, in 1970 and founded and directed the Photo Study Centre there.

He joined the Royal Photographic Society in February 1972 and was visiting speaker and arranger of talks at the Society, as well as for local camera clubs and polytechnics throughout the UK.

In 1972 he moved to the United States to enroll at the University of New Mexico under Beaumont Newhall and Van Deren Coke. He graduated with an MA on the Victorian landscape photographer Francis Bedford. Afterward, he founded the Photographic Studies program at Arizona State University, where he was professor of art history and taught photography history and criticism for 25 years.

He gave hundreds of lectures on photography as a guest at colleges, universities, art schools and camera clubs in Britain, Europe and the United States.

Jay was twice married and divorced, and had three daughters, Juliet, Louise and Hannah. He retired in the late 1990s, leaving Mesa, Arizona, for Ocean Beach near San Diego, then to Sámara on the Nicoya peninsula, Costa Rica, in 2008. He died on 10 May 2009, aged 68. His archive is held at the Center for Creative Photography at the University of Arizona.

== Publications ==
- Views on Nudes. Focal Press, London, 1972. A history of the nude as a subject for photographers, 1840–1970. Second edition: 1980.
- Customs and Faces: Sir Benjamin Stone 1818–1914. Academy Editions, London; St. Martin's Press, New York, 1972.
- Victorian Cameraman: Francis Frith's Views of Rural England 1850–1898. Devon, England: David and Charles, 1973.
- Victorian Candid Camera: Paul Martin 1864–1944. Devon, England: David and Charles, 1973.
- Essays and Photographs: Robert Demachy 1859–1936. Academy Editions, London: St. Martin's Press, New York, 1974.
- Models, Messages, Manipulations. Unique, handmade book of words and pictures. Acquired by Art Museum, University of New Mexico for permanent collection, 1976.
- Negative / Positive: A Philosophy of Photography. Klendall/Hunt Publishing, Second edition: 1982. Reprinted 1989 for Montana State University.
- Light Verse on Victorian Photography. Limner Press, Arizona, 1981. Anthology of poetry from the 19th century press. Edition of 500 copies.
- Route 60 (with James Hajicek). Hand-printed, leather bound livre-de-luxe, containing tipped-in original photographs. Friends of Photography at ASU, 1981, through private donation.
- Photographers Photographed. A selection of my personal portraits in monograph form. Peregrine Smith, Utah, 1983.
- Bernard Shaw: On Photography (with Margaret Moore). The first comprehensive collection of critical essays and images by Shaw. Peregrine Smith, Utah, 1989.
- Occam's Razor: an Outside-In View of Contemporary Photography. Anthology of essays on 20th century issues. Munich: Nazraeli Press, 1992.
- The Photographers: Volume 1. Portfolio of photographic portraits and written profiles. Images printed in collotype by James Hajicek. Munich: Nazraeli Press, 1992.
- U.S. Photo Guide (with Aimee Linhoff). Resource index to over 2,000 institutions, workshops, museums, galleries, periodicals, individuals etc. in academic/fine-art photography. Munich: Nazraeli Press, 1993.
- Some Rollicking Bull: Light Verse, and worse, on Victorian photography. Anthology of ballads, sonnets, odes and songs as well as humorous, strange and odd items from the pages of 19th century photographic periodicals. Munich: Nazraeli Press, 1994.
- On Being a Photographer: a Practical Guide. Photography & the Creative Process: a Series by LensWork Publishing. Anacortes, WA: Lenswork Publishing, 1997. ISBN 978-1-888803-06-8. With David Hurn. And subsequent editions.
- On Looking at Photographs: A Practical Guide. LensWork Publishing, 2000. With David Hurn.
- Cyanide and Spirits: an Inside-Out View of Early Photography. Anthology of essays on 19th century issues, a series of essays collated from the British Journal of Photography. Munich: Nazraeli Press, 1991.
- 61 Pimlico: the Secret Journal of Henry Hayler. Munich: Nazraeli Press, 1998. Movie option rights acquired by Coppos Films, Los Angeles.
- Sun in the Blood of the Cat. An anthology of essays on 19th and 20th century photography. Nazraeli Press, 2001.
- Bill Brandt. One Picture Book No. 9. Nazraeli Press, 2002. ISBN 1-5900-5024-X.
- Men Like Me. Portraits of homeless men in a small California seaside town. Nazraeli Press, 2005.
- Bill Jay's Album, Volume 1. A collection of portraits of photographers, with extended commentaries, reminiscences...

== Films about Jay ==
- Do Not Bend: The Photographic Life of Bill Jay (2018). United Nations of Photography. Produced and directed by Grant Scott and Tim Pellatt

== Collections ==
- Museum of Contemporary Photography, Columbia College, Chicago (photography)
- Center for Creative Photography at the University of Arizona (archive)
