= Longton High School =

Former school in Stoke-on-Trent, England

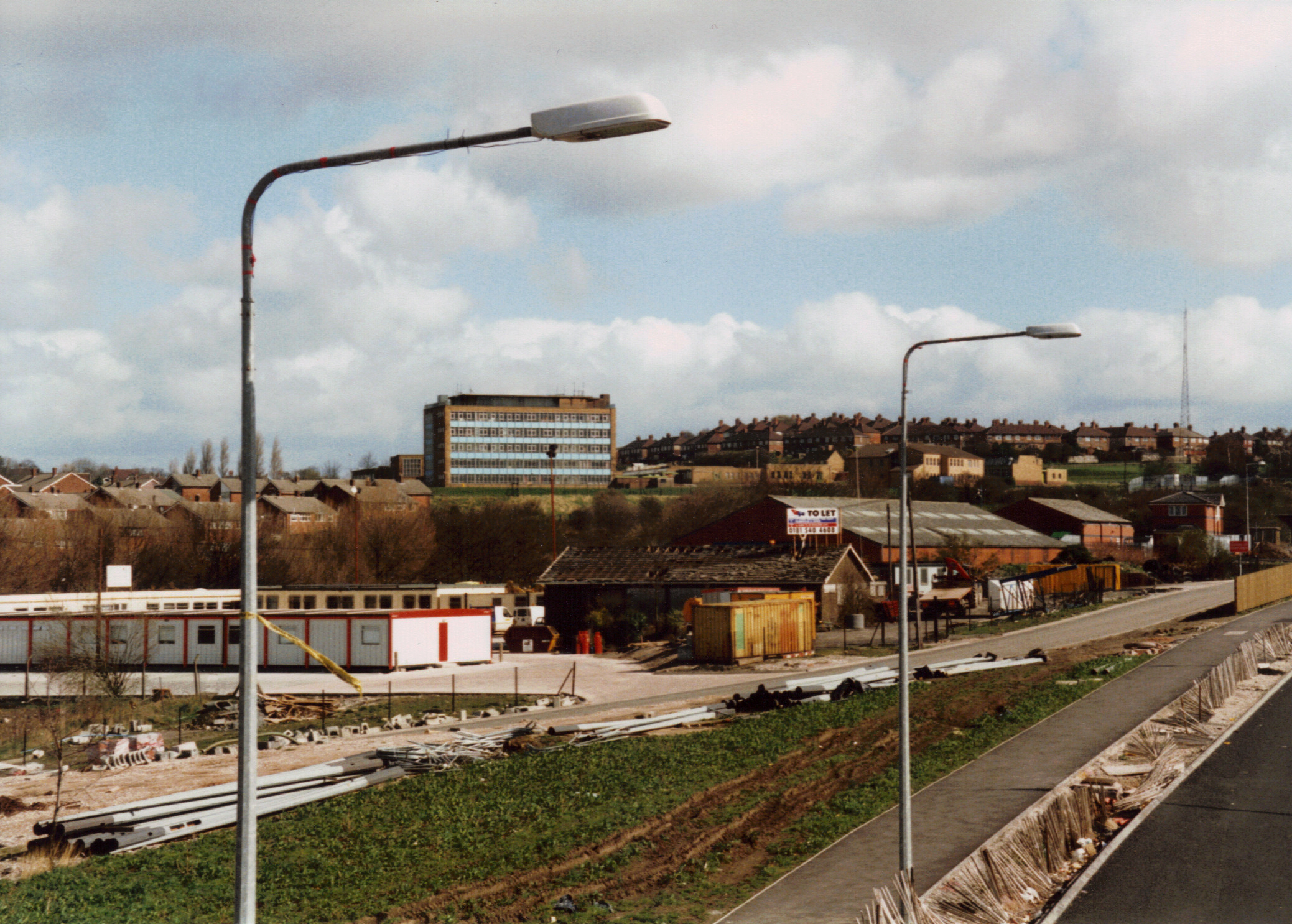
- Box Lane, the final site of the school between 1963 and 2010

Location
- Box Lane; Meir, Staffordshire, ST3 5PR; England
- Coordinates: 52°58′56″N 2°06′32″W

Information
- Type: Comprehensive community school Grammar school prior to 1970
- Motto: Renascor (I am born again)
- Established: 1760
- Closed: 2010
- Local authority: Stoke-on-Trent
- Specialist: 2008–2010 Arts College
- Department for Education URN: 124386 Tables
- Ofsted: Reports
- Gender: Co-educational
- Age: 11 to 16
- Houses: Astbury; Brindley; Bennett; Mitchell; Lodge; Wedgwood

Longton High School was a school in Longton and later Meir, Staffordshire from 1760 to 2010.

== History ==
The school was founded in 1760 with an endowment from John Bourne and was known as the Longton Free School. By 1763, enough money had been provided for the purchase of land and the construction of a school building, on land near to St John's church in Longton. In the 1820s, the trustees decided to merge the school with the nearby St John's national school and the school lost its separate identity for some years. The national school closed some time between 1859 and 1872 and the trustees of the Bourne estate decided to recreate the free school as a secondary school. The Endowed Schools Act 1869 enabled the trustees to sell the old property and in 1885 a new school was built in Trentham Road, Longton. Management of the Longton Endowed School passed in 1900 from the trustees to Longton Borough Council, who placed it under the control of the headmaster of the nearby Sutherland Institute.

Now known as Longton High School, the school specialised as a science school supporting the local pottery industry, and for the first time since the national school days it was co-educational and admitted both girls and boys.

Up to the early 1930s, the school remained co-educational, and, together with Hanley High School, was one of two high schools in the Stoke-on-Trent area. When Brownhills Girls High School opened in the early 1930s and Thistley Hough Girls High School opened in 1938, Longton High School no longer took in girls. It was run by the City of Stoke-on-Trent Education Committee and had around 700 boys with a three-form entry. Having outgrown the Trentham Road site, new premises were needed and in 1940 construction of a new building at Sandon Road, Meir was commenced. Due to the Second World War, the school did not move into the new premises until 1947 as the new buildings had been requisitioned.

In 1963, the school moved from Sandon Road in Meir to a site in Box Lane, and took in girls in the first year as a co-educational 11–18 grammar school.

=== Comprehensive ===
It became a comprehensive in September 1970, with an age range of 12–16. From April 1974 until 1997, it was administered by Staffordshire Education Committee.

The school gained specialist Arts College status in 2007. In this time it was known as Longton High School and Arts College.

=== Closure ===
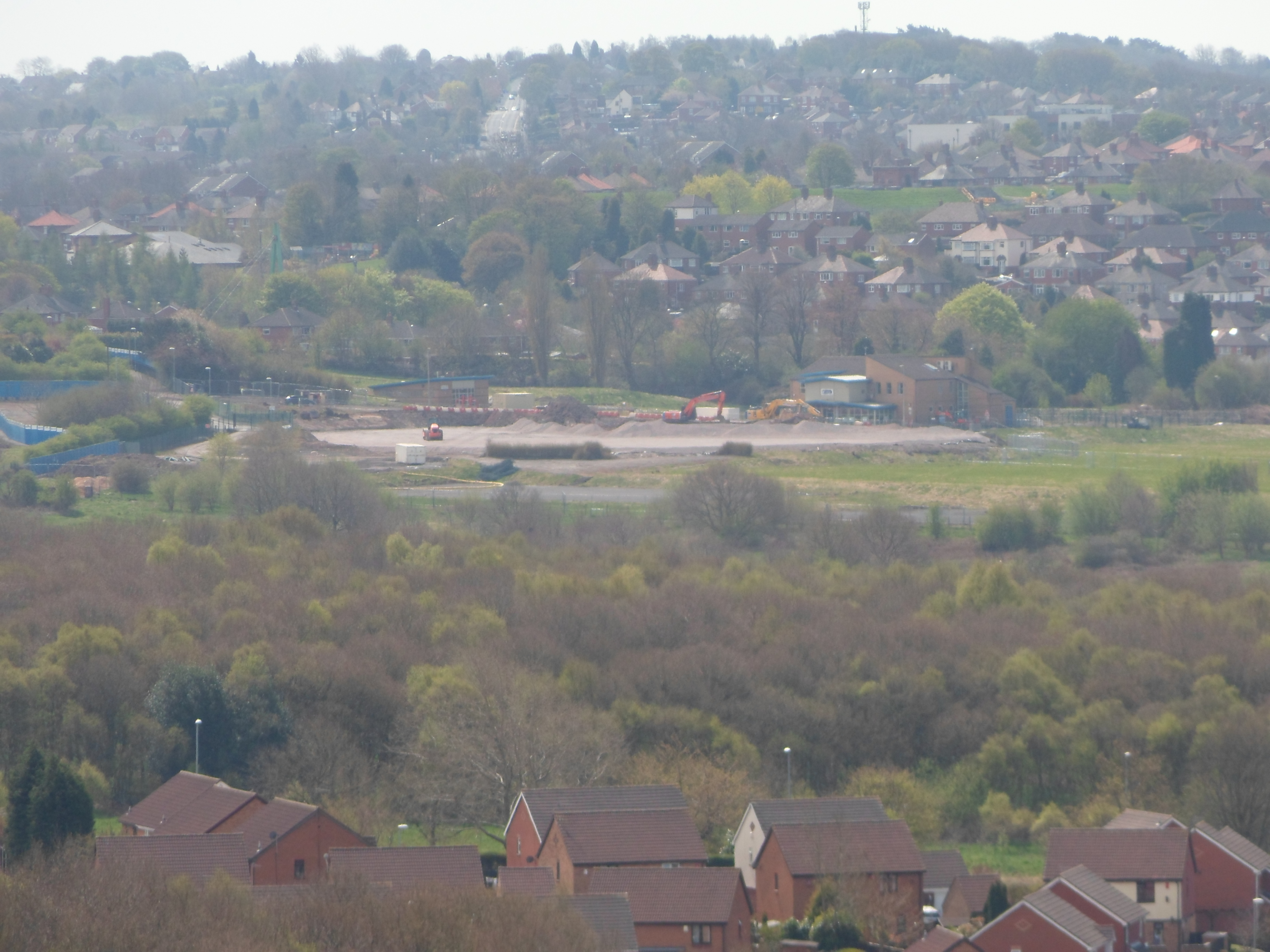
The Box Lane site after demolition of most of the buildings

Stoke-on-Trent City Council announced its plans for secondary education in 2008 as its response to the government's Building Schools for the Future programme. Under the plan, Longton High was designated as one of four secondary schools to be closed due to falling numbers of students. A campaign to save the school was started but the council did not alter their decision. To mark the closing of the school in 2010, a time capsule was buried. The students were transferred to Sandon Business and Enterprise College. (Sandon High School was established in the Sandon Road site when Longton High moved to Box Lane.) Following the closure, the site was used by Sandon Business and Enterprise College until July 2011. On 18 December 2011, the main building was demolished and the rest of the site, except for the newish technology block, was cleared early in 2012. Abbey Hill School and Performing Arts College were built in 2014 leaving some buildings to be incorporated into the new school

== Houses ==
The houses were called Astbury, Brindley, Bennett, Mitchell, Lodge, and Wedgwood, after notable local people, and a stained glass window depicting them was a feature at both the Sandon Road and Box Lane sites. The houses later became Ashley, Bourne, Cheshire and Macmillan.

== Former teachers ==
School Crest and prize bookplate, July 1904

- Samuel John Astbury (12 January 1871 – 16 January 1917), Head Teacher c1911.
- Sir Emrys Evans (taught classics in 1918–9)
- Edward Haigh MA (Cantab) (1851-1931), Headmaster c.1889-1900. (Note: Succeeded by George George in 1900.)
- Walter Harris PhD MA, Headmaster c.1904.

== Notable alumni ==
=== Boys' grammar school ===
- Samuel John Astbury (26 June 1897 – 22 August 1968). Sidney Sussex College, Cambridge, 1916–20; on staff of N. Hingley & Sons, Ltd., Netherton Ironworks, Dudley, 1920–33, as Chief Metallurgist, Fellow Royal Statistical Society. Secretary to the Institute of Petroleum.
- Norman Frederick Astbury CBE, (1 December 1908 – 28 October 1987). Director from 1960–1973 of the British Ceramic Research Association, and president in 1969–1970 of the British Ceramic Society. (Younger brother to William Astbury, below. Nephew of Samuel John Astbury, former head teacher of Longton High School c1911.)
- William Astbury, physicist and molecular biologist, Professor of Biomolecular Structure from 1945–1961 at the University of Leeds. (Elder brother to Norman Frederick Astbury, above)
- Prof Geoffrey Boulton OBE, Regius Professor of Geology and Mineralogy from 1986–2008 at the University of Edinburgh
- Cliff Brittle, Chairman 1996–1998 of the Rugby Football Union
- Sir Arthur Bryan, Managing Director 1963–1985 (and Chairman 1968–1986) of Wedgwood, Lord Lieutenant of Staffordshire 1968–1993 and President in 1970–1971 of the British Ceramic Manufacturers' Federation
- Air Commodore Jack Frost
- Prof John L. Jinks CBE, Professor of Genetics from 1985–1987 at the University of Birmingham, President 1981–1984 of the Genetical Society of Great Britain (now The Genetics Society), who discovered that in-bred plants could be as good as those produced by hybrid vigour
- Murray Martin, documentary and docudrama filmmaker, co-founder of Amber Film & Photography Collective
- Raymond Thompson CBE, chemist
- Prof Charles Tomlinson, poet, Professor of English from 1982–1992 at the University of Bristol

=== Later co-educational grammar school ===
- Robbie Earle, footballer
- David Kidney, Labour MP from 1997–2010 for Stafford
- Steve Platt, Editor 1991–1996 of the New Statesman
