= Graham Smith (photographer) =

British photographer and woodworker

Graham Smith (born 1947) is a photographer from Middlesbrough, England, who was particularly active in photographing Middlesbrough and the north-east of England in the 1970s and 1980s. Smith curtailed his career as a photographer in 1990, since when he has been a professional woodworker.

== Life and work ==
Smith studied at the Middlesbrough College of Art and later the Royal College of Art (London). In the 1970s, he was among the photographers central to the Side Gallery, and created a series of photographs that showed working-class people in the north of England that were in a documentary style but were in fact montages. Work from the 1980s would show people within townscapes, and in the words of David Alan Mellor, were "atmospheric, steeped in popular (and personal) memory — dark, romantic places with all the melancholy attributed to Eugène Atget's familiar locations". Another Country, a joint exhibition with Chris Killip held in London in 1985, was generally well reviewed but to some appeared passé in the light of the new "postmodern" work of Martin Parr and others.

Smith curtailed his career as a photographer in 1990, since when he has been a professional woodworker. His writing has appeared in Granta.

Smith's photographs are in the permanent collections of the Museum of Modern Art (New York), and the Victoria and Albert Museum (London).

== Exhibitions ==
- Documents of the North East. With Sirkka-Liisa Konttinen, James Cleet, and Robert Carling. Side Gallery (Newcastle), 1977.
- Three Perspectives on Photography: Recent British Photography. Hayward Gallery, London, June–July 1979. With Thomas Cooper, Brian Griffin, Raymond Moore, Roger Palmer, Martin Parr, Aileen Ferriday, Christine Hobbeheydar, Yve Lomax, Sarah McCarthy, Jo Spence, Valerie Wilmer, Victor Burgin, Robert Golden, Hackney Flashers, Alexis Hunter.
- North Tyneside. With Izabela Jedrzejczyk, Markéta Luskačová, and Sirkka-Liisa Konttinen. Side Gallery (Newcastle), 1981.
- Consett Steel. Side Gallery (Newcastle), 1982.
- South Bank. Side Gallery (Newcastle), 1984.
- Another Country. With Chris Killip. Serpentine Gallery (London), 1985.
- Quayside. With Sirkka-Liisa Konttinen. Touring exhibition from the Side Gallery (Newcastle), 1994.
- No Such Thing as Society: Photography in Britain 1968–1987. Aberystwyth Arts Centre; Tullie House, Carlisle; Ujazdów Castle, Warsaw; Smith is one of a number of photographers shown.
- Three from Britain. With Chris Killip and Martin Parr. Rose Gallery, Santa Monica, March–May 2008.

== Writing ==
- "Albert Smith." Granta 95: Loved Ones. Granta, 2006. ISBN 0-903141-88-4.
