= Markéta Luskačová =

Czech photographer

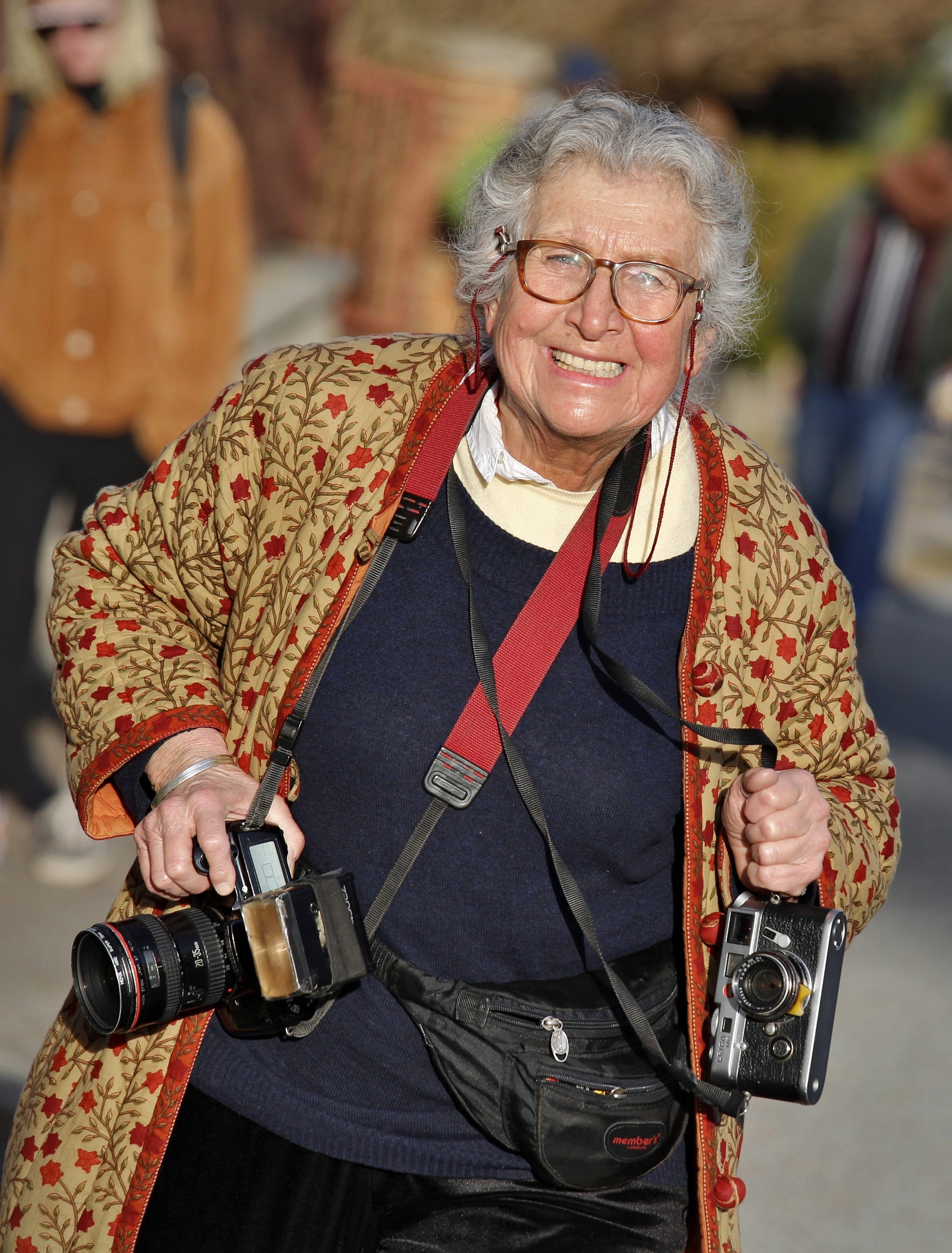

Markéta Luskačová (born 1944) is a Czech photographer known for her series of photographs taken in Slovakia, Britain and elsewhere. Considered one of the best Czech social photographers to date, since the 1990s she has photographed children in the Czech Republic, Slovakia, and also Poland.

== Biography ==
Luskačová was born in Prague. In 1968 she graduated from Charles University there with a thesis on religion in Slovakia. During her stay in Slovakia, she became familiar with the old Christian rites and decided to return with a camera to document the surviving traditions. Her thesis was titled Poutě na Východním Slovensku (Pilgrimages in East Slovakia). Following that she studied photography at FAMU, in this period photographing in Slovakia and Poland.

From 1970 to 1972, Luskačová photographed stage performances of the Za branou theatre, founded by director Otomar Krejča. However, the theatre was banned by communists in the spring of 1972. The same year, she was allowed to display the cycle Pilgrims in the Gallery of Visual Arts in Roudnice nad Labem (the curator of the exhibition was the photography theorist and art historian Anna Fárová).

In 1971, Luskačová married the poet Franz H. Wurm (native of Prague and a British citizen). Wurm, terrified by the "Normalization" in Czechoslovakia, left the country and Luskačová asked the state authorities for permission to visit her husband abroad. After several short visits she received a form for emigration (1975) and went to live in England. However, in an interview she claimed: "Bohemia, Prague and Šumiac have never ceased to be my home. I always took my life abroad as a kind of stopgap that stretched to be a considerable part of my life."

In the 1970s and 1980s, the communist censorship attempted to conceal her international reputation. Her works were banned in Czechoslovakia, and the catalogues for the exhibition Pilgrims in the Victoria and Albert Museum were lost on their way to Czechoslovakia.

Luskačová started photographing London's markets in 1974. In the markets of Portobello Road, Brixton and Spitalfields, she "[found] a vivid Dickensian staging".

As a Magnum Photos nominee, Luskačová photographed Chiswick Women's Aid in the 1970s. Shortly afterwards, she and the photographer Chris Killip had a son, Matthew. The photographs remained unpublished until 2020.

In 2016 she self-published a collection of photographs of street musicians, mostly taken in the markets of east London, under the title To Remember: London Street Musicians 1975–1990, and with an introduction by John Berger.

== Exhibitions ==
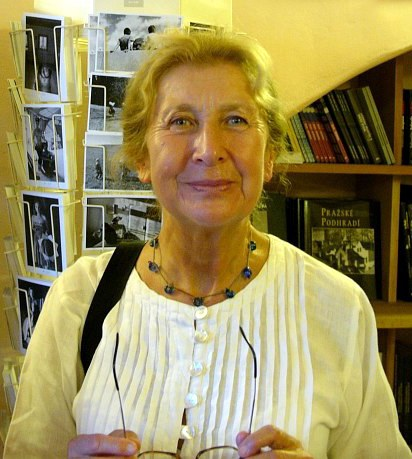
Luskačová, Prague, 2008

- Photographs from the Beaches (with Sirkka-Liisa Konttinen). Side Gallery (Newcastle), 1978.
- North Tyneside (with Izabela Jedrzejczyk, Sirkka-Liisa Konttinen and Graham Smith). Side Gallery (Newcastle), 1981.
- Pilgrims. Side Gallery (Newcastle), 1985.
- Primary Concerns. Side Gallery (Newcastle), 1989.
- Photographs of Spitalfields. Whitechapel Art Gallery (London), 1991.
- Poutníci. Fotografická galerie Fiducia (Ostrava), 2001–2002.
- No Such Thing as Society: Photography in Britain 1968–1987. Aberystwyth Arts Centre; Tullie House, Carlisle; Ujazdów Castle, Warsaw; Luskačová is one of a number of photographers shown.
- The Photogeny of Identity – The Memory of Czech Photography, National Museum of Photography (Jindřichův Hradec), 2008.
- The Third Side of the Wall: Photography in Czechoslovakia 1969–1988 from the Collection of the Moravian Gallery in Brno. Moravian Gallery in Brno, 2008–2009.
- Markéta Luskačová, Tate Britain, London, January–May 2019.

== Publications ==
=== Books of work by Luskačová ===
- Pilgrims: Victoria & Albert Museum. London: Victoria and Albert Museum, 1983. ISBN 0-905209-60-5. Exhibition catalogue.
- Pilgrims. London: Arts Council of Great Britain, 1985. ISBN 0-7287-0443-9. Exhibition catalogue, with text by John Berger.
- Judlová, Marie. Markéta Luskačová. Prague: Galerie hlavního města Prahy, 1991.
- Markéta Luskačová: Photographs of Spitalfields. London: Whitechapel Gallery, 1991. Exhibition catalogue. With 72 pages, 32 plates, and a preface by Catherine Lampert and texts by David Widgery ("Ripe bananas and stolen bicycles"), Mark Holborn and Chris Killip.
- Markéta Luskačová: Fotografie ze Spitalfields (Londýn 1974–1990). Brno: Dům umění města Brna, 1995. ISBN 80-7009-074-X.
- Unknown Remembered: Photographs of Children, 1968-98. [Prague]: Galerie G4; Sydney: Stills Gallery, 1998. Exhibition catalogue, with text in Czech and English by Colin Osman.
- Markéta Luskačová. Prague: Torst, 2001. ISBN 80-7215-129-0. (in Czech and English) Book with introductory texts by Marie Klimešová, Gerry Badger, and Josef Topol.
- O smrti, o koních a jiných lidech / On Death and Horses and Other People: Maškary–Masks: 1999–2010: Roztoky–Únětice. [Roztoky], Czech Republic: Sdružení Roztoč, 2011. ISBN 978-80-254-8402-9. (in Czech and English) Catalogue of an exhibition, with short texts by Howard Bossen and Robert Silverio.
- To Remember: London Street Musicians 1975–1990. [Prague: Markéta Luskačová], 2016. ISBN 978-80-270-0241-2. With texts in English and Czech by Luskačová, Howard Bossen and John Berger.
- By the Sea: Photographs from the North East, 1976–1980. Bristol: RRB, 2019. Edition of 600 copies. ISBN 9781916057517. (Note: RRB's description of By the Sea.)

=== Zines of work by Luskačová ===
- Chiswick Women's Aid 1976–77. Southport: Café Royal, 2020. Edition of 500 copies. (Note: Café Royal's description of Chiswick Women's Aid 1976–77.)
- Ireland 1972–73. Southport: Café Royal, 2021. Edited by Craig Atkinson. (Note: Café Royal's description of Ireland 1972–73.)

== Sources ==
- Birgus, Vladimír; Mlčoch, Jan (2010). Czech Photography of the 20th Century. Prague: Kant; Museum of Decorative Arts in Prague. ISBN 978-80-7437-027-4. (in Czech and English)
- Mellor, David Alan. No Such Thing as Society: Photography in Britain 1967–1987: From the British Council and the Arts Council Collection. London: Hayward Publishing, 2007. ISBN 978-1-85332-265-5.
- coll. (2006). Fotogenie identity/The Photogeny of Identity. Prague: Kant; Prague House of Photography. ISBN 80-86970-12-4. (in English)
