= Norman Frederick Astbury =

British physicist and engineer

Norman Frederick Astbury CBE, CEng, FIEE, CPhys, FInstP, HonFICeram, FRSA
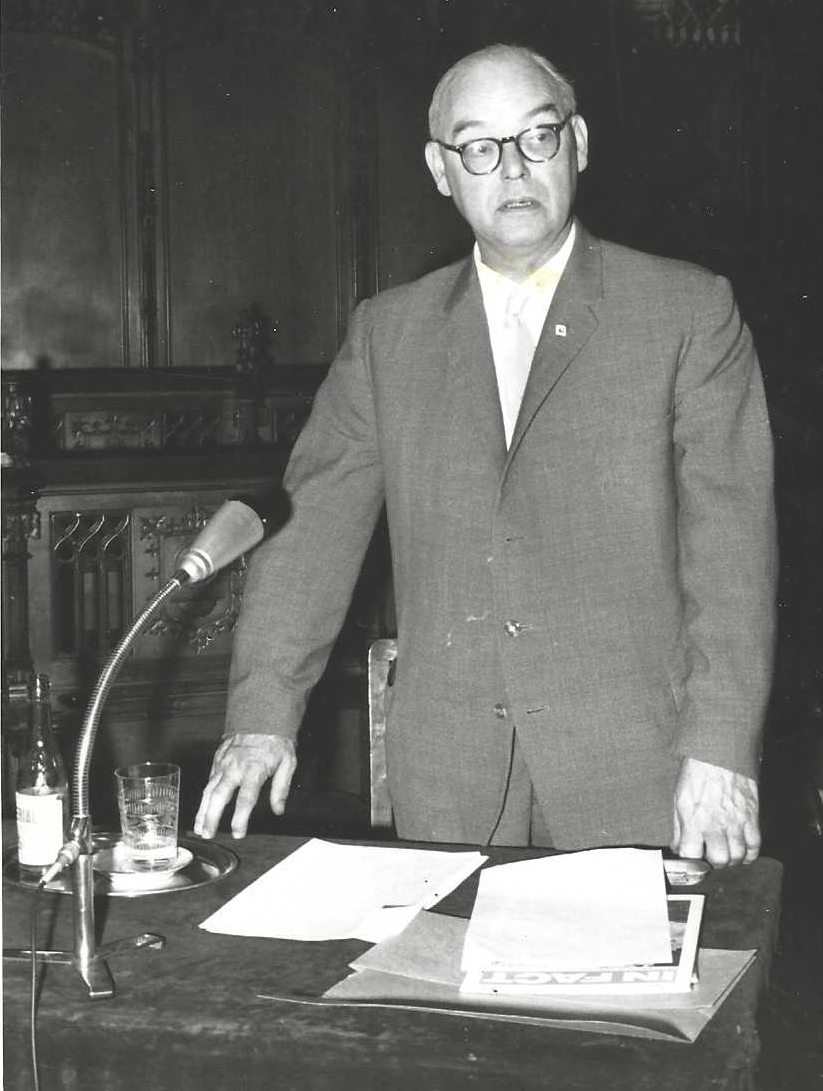
- Born: 1 December 1908; Longton, Stoke-on-Trent, England
- Died: 28 October 1987 (aged 78); Bideford, Devon, England
- Spouse: Nora Enid Astbury (née Wilkinson)
- Children: 4
- Relatives: William Astbury (brother)
- Scientific career
- Fields: Ceramics, electricity, engineering, magnetism, and mathematics

Norman Frederick Astbury (1 December 1908 – 28 October 1987) was a British physicist and engineer whose career spanned academia, government research, and industry. He graduated with a Double First in Natural Sciences from St John's College, Cambridge, England. (Note: Astbury, Norman Frederick: 'Who was Who' published 2016 by A & C Black, an imprint of Bloomsbury Publishing plc. The online edition is managed by Oxford University Press (OUP), which provides digital access through the official website.)

Early in his career, Astbury contributed to the redetermination of the ohm at the National Physical Laboratory (NPL) in Teddington and conducted wartime research into electro-acoustic harbour defences at HM Anti-Submarine Experimentation Establishment. After the Second World War, he established the central research laboratory for the Guest, Keen and Nettlefold (GKN) group of companies. Later, as Director of the British Ceramic Research Association (now Lucideon), he initiated research into the effects of gas explosions on structural masonry.

== Early life and education ==
Astbury was the youngest of seven children, born in Normacot, Longton, Stoke-on-Trent to William Edwin Astbury and Clara (née Dean) Astbury. (Note: Astbury, Norman Frederick: ‘The Register of Twentieth-Century Johnians, Volume I Page 15’ published in 2004 by St John's College, Cambridge. ISBN 9780950108575) Astbury's father was a potter's turner. Astbury attended Longton High School from 1919 to 1926 where he was head boy and the Duke of Sutherland's gold medallist.

He later pursued studies in Natural Sciences at St John's College Cambridge, where he was both a scholar and a prizeman. (Note: N. F. Astbury: Prizeman: Cambridge University Calendar, 1928–1929, pp. 583–4, and 1929–1930, pp. 630 and 634.) St John’s College offered entrance scholarships of £60-£100 a year tenable for at least two years: Astbury held one of these as an undergraduate. The college also offered a prize of books to the value of three guineas for performance in examinations: Astbury won prizes for his performance in both Part I and Part II of the Natural Sciences Tripos in 1928 and 1929 respectively. He achieved first class honours in both parts of the natural sciences tripos.

He married Nora Enid Wilkinson in 1933.

== Career ==
=== National Physical Laboratory, Teddington (1929–1939) ===
Following university, Astbury began his career as a member of the staff at the National Physical Laboratory (NPL) in Teddington, England. Collaborating with his senior colleague, Leslie Hartshorn, he contributed to work on primary and secondary electrical standards. His responsibilities included tasks such as re-establishing the primary inductance standard and conducting a redetermination of the ohm.

=== HM Anti-Submarine Experimentation Establishment, Portland and Faslane (1939–1945) ===
During World War II, Astbury served in the Royal Naval Scientific Service, focusing on issues related to harbour defence and electro-acoustics. His work involved contributions to the HM Anti-Submarine Experimentation Establishment and ship degaussing initiatives.

=== Joseph Sankey & Guest Keen & Nettlefold, Bilston (1945–1949) ===
In 1945 Astbury joined Joseph Sankey and Sons, where he became Director of Research and was tasked with establishing a research laboratory. This facility later became the central laboratory for the Guest, Keen and Nettlefold (GKN) group of companies. His work primarily focused on the processing and properties of electrical sheet steel. Under his direction, the laboratory expanded its scope to address a broad range of issues in applied physics.

=== University of New South Wales, Sydney (1949–1951) ===
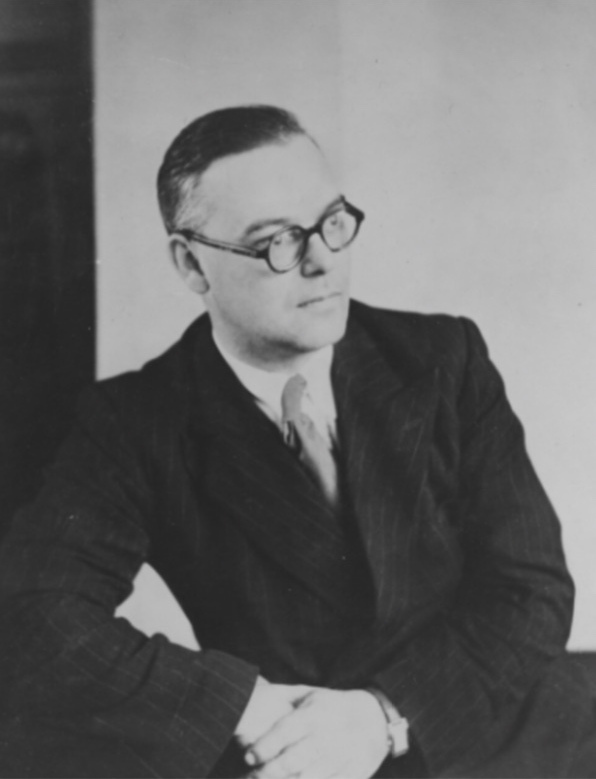
Astbury in 1950 at the University of New South Wales

In 1949, Astbury was appointed Professor of Applied Physics at the newly established New South Wales University of Technology. He held this post until 1951, when he accepted a position at the Gordon Memorial College in Khartoum, Sudan.

=== Gordon Memorial College, Khartoum (1951–1956) ===
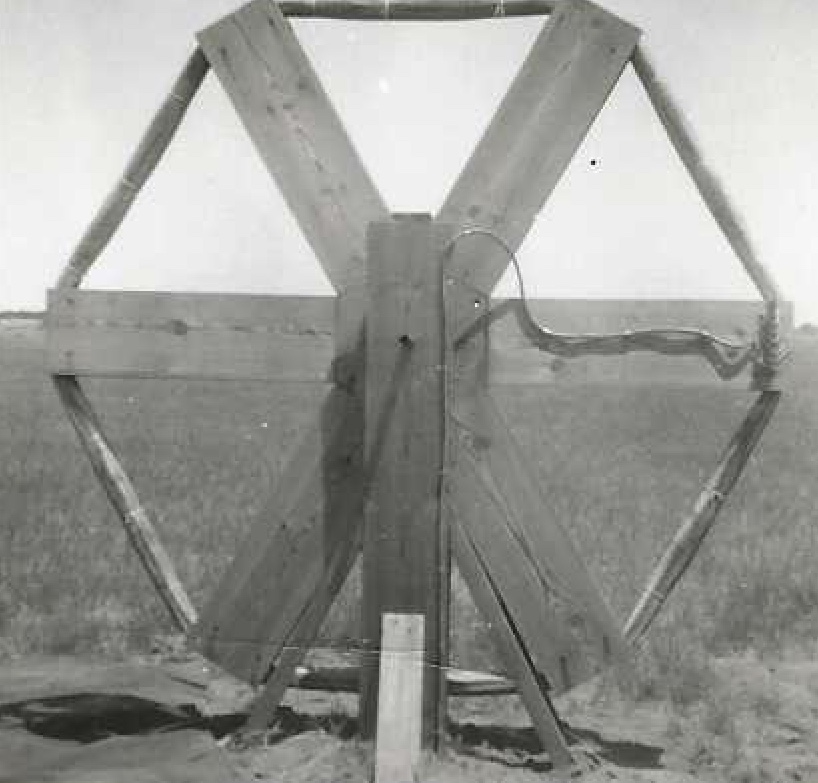
Astbury's experiment to measure changes in the Earth's magnetic field.

In 1951, Astbury was appointed Professor of Physics and Dean of the Faculty of Science at the Gordon Memorial College in Khartoum, (now University of Khartoum). During his tenure, he designed and conducted an experiment on campus to measure changes in the Earth's magnetic field during the total solar eclipse on 25 February 1952. His findings contributed to ongoing global research on the topic and were published in Nature on 12 July 1952, under the title "Micro-Magnetic Variations During the Solar Eclipse of February 25, 1952."

=== Royal Aircraft Establishment, Farnborough (1956–1957) ===
The Royal Aircraft Establishment (RAE) was a British research institution that operated under various names throughout its history and ultimately became part of the UK Ministry of Defence (MoD). Following its dissolution, its functions were distributed among various government departments, and its records are now housed with DSTL (Defence Science and Technology Laboratory), FAST (Farnborough Air Sciences Trust) and The National Archives (United Kingdom).

During his two years at the RAE, Astbury investigated the effects of atmospheric precipitation on the nose cones of supersonic aircraft. His research in this latter area was connected to the ceramic materials used in manufacturing processes, linking to his subsequent work at the British Ceramic Research Association (1957–1973).

=== British Ceramic Research Association, Stoke-on-Trent (1957–1973) ===
Astbury served as Deputy Director of the British Ceramic Research Association (BCRA), from 1957 to 1960 and as Director from 1960 to 1973. BCRA, based in Stoke-on-Trent, served as the main research and development organisation for the UK ceramics industry. Its core functions included scientific and technical research, testing and analysis, consultancy and technical support and standards and safety.

While at BCRA, Astbury conducted research into structural masonry and the effect of gas explosions on building materials of the type that destroyed Ronan Point, a newly constructed 22-storey tower block in Canning Town, East London, on 16 May 1968.

== Awards and honours ==
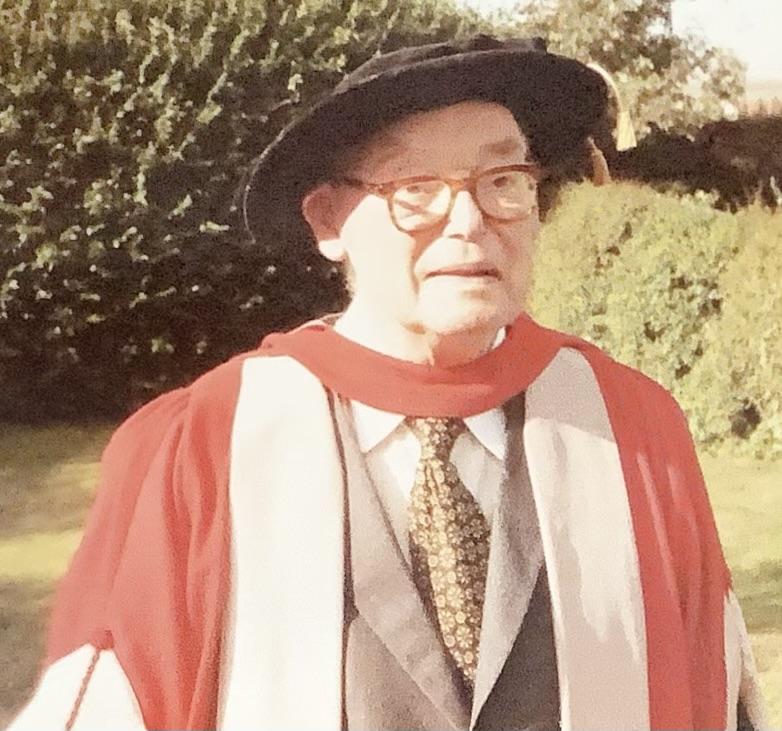
Astbury in his doctoral robes, 1986.

In 1954, the Faculty of Engineering at the University of Cambridge awarded Astbury a doctor of science degree in recognition of his contributions to applied physics and was supported by the submission of 36 published papers on engineering topics.

In 1968, Astbury was appointed a Commander of the British Empire (CBE) for services to industry in the New Year Honours' List under the government of Prime Minister Harold Wilson.

== Personal life and death ==
Upon his retirement from the British Ceramic Research Association (BCRA), he was presented with an early reel-to-reel tape recorder. He utilized this device to record one part of a piano duet and subsequently played it back while performing the second part himself. This practice led to the development of an extensive personal collection of duet recordings.

Astbury died on 28 October 1987. He was survived by four children. His wife had predeceased him.

== Publications ==
- Astbury, N. F. (1940). "Balance detectors for A.C. bridges". Journal of Scientific Instruments. 17 (25): 25–32. Bibcode:1940JScI...17...25A. doi:10.1088/0950-7671/17/2/301.
- Astbury, N. F. (22 February 1949). "Some theoretical considerations on the dynamic properties of plastics". Proceedings of the Royal Society of London. Series A. Mathematical and Physical Sciences. 196 (1044): 92–105. Bibcode:1949RSPSA.196...92A. doi:10.1098/rspa.1949.0016. ISSN 0080-4630.
- Astbury, N. F. (1952). Industrial Magnetic Testing. London: The Institute of Physics.
- Astbury, N. F. (1956). Introduction to Electrical Applied Physics. London: Chapman & Hall.
- Astbury, N. F. (November 1963). "Alternating-Current Properties of a Copper Conductor Clad in a Magnetic Sheath". Proceedings of the Institution of Electrical Engineers. 110 (11): 2055–2062. doi:10.1049/piee.1963.0296.
- Astbury, N. F. et al British Ceramic Research Association (1970) Gas explosions in load-bearing brick structures
- Astbury, N. F., Herbert William Harcourt West, H. R. Hodgkinson – British Ceramic Research Association (1972) – Blast Effect Experimental Gas Explosions: Report of Further Tests at Potters Marston
- Hartshorn, L.; Astbury, N. F. (1937). "The Absolute Measurement of Resistance by the Method of Albert Campbell". Philosophical Transactions of the Royal Society of London. Series A, Mathematical and Physical Sciences. 236 (769): 423–471. Bibcode:1937RSPTA.236..423H. doi:10.1098/rsta.1937.0007. ISSN 0080-4614. JSTOR 91304.

== Appointments ==
- Fellow, Royal Society of Arts 1948 - 1987
- Member, National Council for Technological Awards 1958-1964
- President, British Ceramic Society 1968–69
- Education and Membership Committee and Council Member, Institute of Physics and Physical Society 1963–1966
- Committee Chairman, Directors of Research Associations 1964–1966
- Vice President, Parliamentary and Scientific Committee 1965–1968
- Governor, North Staffordshire Polytechnic 1969
- Advisory Board, Journal of Scientific Instruments
- Advisory Board, British Journal of Applied Physics
- Member, Board of Studies, National Council for Technological Awards

== Profession qualifications ==
- CEng – A Chartered Engineer (CEng) is an engineer registered with the UK's regulatory body for the engineering profession, the Engineering Council.
- FIEE – Fellow of the Institute of Electrical Engineers (FIEE) was the highest level of membership in the Institute of Electrical Engineers. In 2006, the IEE merged with the Institution of Incorporated Engineers (IIE) to form a new organization called the Institution of Engineering and Technology (IET).
- FInstP – Fellow of the Institute of Physics (FInstP) is the highest level of membership attainable by physicists who are members of the Institute of Physics.
- Hon FICeram – Honorary Fellow of the Institute of Ceramics a professional designation awarded by the Institute of Materials, Minerals and Mining (IOM3), specifically under its Ceramics Division and is one of the highest levels of professional recognition within the field of ceramics. It indicates that the holder has made a significant contribution to the science, technology, or industry of ceramics and typically requires a combination of extensive experience, leadership, and professional achievement in the ceramics sector.
