= UK Memory of the World Register =

National register of cultural heritage

The UK Memory of the World Register is part of the UNESCO Memory of the World Programme.

The UK register recognises documentary heritage of outstanding national importance. Any documentary heritage can be nominated in a biennial application process. The applications are assessed by a panel of experts in the care and use of documentary heritage and successful nominations are ‘inscribed’ onto the register. This recognition by UNESCO helps to raise the profile of the individual subscriptions which in turn can lead to additional funding, public recognition and use. The programme generally raises awareness of the importance of caring for and providing access to documentary heritage.

Title	Date	Year of Inscrip- tion	Nominating Institution(s)	Source(s)
Charter of King William I to the City of London	1067	2010	City of London Corporation	
Peterloo Relief Fund account book	1819	2010	John Rylands University Library, University of Manchester	
WVS/WRVS narrative reports	1939–96	2010	WRVS	
Letter from George Stephenson	1827	2010	Liverpool Record Office	
Peniarth manuscript collection	12th–19th century	2010	National Library of Wales	
Company of Scotland Trading to Africa & the Indies records	1695–1707	2010	Royal Bank of Scotland Group and National Library of Scotland	
The Life Story of David Lloyd George	1918	2010	National Screen and Sound Archive, National Library of Wales	
The Chepman and Myllar prints	1508	2010	National Library of Scotland	
Pont manuscript maps	1583–1614	2010	National Library of Scotland	
St Kilda, Britain's Loneliest Isle	1923, 1928	2010	National Library of Scotland	
Diaries of Anne Lister	1806–40	2011	West Yorkshire Archive Service	
Cura Pastoralis of Gregory	c.890	2011	Bodleian Library	
Gough Map	14th century	2011	Bodleian Library	
Bank of Scotland archives	1695–2001	2011	Lloyds Banking Group Archives	
Wakefield court rolls	1274–1925	2011	Yorkshire Archaeological Society	
Death warrant of King Charles I	1649	2011	Parliamentary Archives	
Bill of Rights	1689	2011	Parliamentary Archives	
John Murray archive	1768 to early 21st century	2011	National Library of Scotland	
Jersey occupation archive	1940–45	2011	Jersey Heritage	
Customer account ledgers of Edward Backwell	1663–1672	2011	Royal Bank of Scotland	
Edinburgh and Lothian HIV/AIDS collections	1983–2010	2011	Lothian Health Services Archive	
Narrative created through Sirkka-Liisa Konttinen's photography and Amber's films	1969–2009	2011	Amber Collective	
Winchester pipe rolls	1208–09 to 1710–11	2011	Hampshire Record Office, run by Hampshire County Council	
Medieval records of St Giles's Hospital, Norwich	1249–1988	2011	Norfolk Record Office	
Peter Worden collection of Mitchell and Kenyon films	early 20th century	2011	British Film Institute National Archive	
GPO Film Unit collection	1933–40	2011	British Postal Museum & Archive, BT Heritage and British Film Institute	
Wedgwood Museum archive	18th century onwards	2011	Wedgwood Museum	
Documentary heritage of the Women's suffrage movement in Britain	1865–1928	2011	Women's Library and Parliamentary Archives	
BT Research Centre collection	1879–1995	2011	BT Heritage	
The Children's Society archive	19th century onwards	2011	The Children's Society	
Tyne & Wear Shipyards collection	(undated)	2012	Tyne & Wear Archives and Museums	
Aberdeen Burgh Registers	1398–1509	2012	Aberdeen City Council	
Hitchcock's Silent Films	1925–1929	2012	British Film Institute (BFI)	
Churchill Archives	late 19th century onwards	2012	Churchill Archives Centre, Churchill College	
Autograph First World War Diary of Field Marshal Sir Douglas Haig	1914–1919	2012	National Library of Scotland	
Domesday Book	1086	2012	The National Archives	
Royal Scottish National Institution archives	1862–20th century	2012	University of Stirling	
Dorothy Wordsworth's Journal	19th century	2012	Wordsworth Trust	
Thomas Hardy Archives	19th century	2012	Dorset Museum	
London County Council Bomb Damage Maps	1940–1945	2012	London Metropolitan Archives	
Robert Stephenson and Company archives	1823–c1960	2012	National Railway Museum	
The "Shakespeare Documents"	1564–1616	2014	Shakespeare Birthplace Trust and The National Archives	
The Roman era Bath curse tablets	2nd century–late 4th century	2014	Bath & North East Somerset Council	
Neath Abbey Iron Works	1792–1882	2014	West Glamorgan Archive Service	
The papers of the Royal National Institution for the Preservation of Life from Shipwreck	1823–1854	2014	Royal National Lifeboat Institution (RNLI)	
Hepworth Cinema Interviews	20th century	2014	National Screen & Sound Archive of Wales	
Robert Hooke’s Diary, 1672–1683	1672–1683	2014	Culture, Heritage and Libraries Department of the City of London Corporation	
The Royal Mail Archive, 1636–1969	1636–1969	2014	The British Postal Museum and Archive	
The Carmichael Watson Collection: A Celtic Collector's Folklore Odyssey	19th century–early 20th century	2014	Edinburgh University Library	
West Riding Pauper Lunatic Asylum Records, 1814–1991	1814–1991	2014	West Yorkshire Archive Service	
Canterbury Cathedral collection	9th century–1540	2016	Canterbury Cathedral	
Archive of Charles Booth’s Inquiry into the Life and Labour of the People in London, 1886-1903	1886–1903	2016	London School of Economics Library	
Dean & Chapter Exeter Library Manuscript	circa 970	2016	Dean & Chapter of Exeter Cathedral	
The Declaration of Arbroath	6 April 1320	2016	National Records of Scotland	
The Royal Institution Laboratory Notebooks of Michael Faraday	19th century	2016	Royal Institution	
Great Parchment Book of The Honourable The Irish Society	1639	2016	London Metropolitan Archives, City of London Corporation	
The Correspondence Collection of Robert Owen	1821–1858	2016	Co-operative Heritage Trust	
Survey of the Manors of Crickhowell and Tretower, 1587 by Robert Johnson	1587	2016	National Library of Wales	
The Commonwealth War Graves Commission Casualty Archive	20th century	2018	Commonwealth War Graves Commission	
The Cotton Collection of Manuscripts	circa 4th -17th century	2018	British Library	
Eton Choirbook	1500-1504	2018	Eton College	
The Base and Field Reports, and related Photographic material of the British Antarctic Survey and its Predecessors	20th century	2018	British Antarctic Survey	
The Chronicle of Elis Gruffudd, ‘Soldier of Calais’	circa 1550-52	2018	National Library of Wales	
Early Gaelic Manuscripts of the Advocates Library	pre 17th century	2018	National Library of Scotland	

== See also ==
- Memory of the World Register – Europe and North America for UK documents on the international list
