= Murray Martin =

Murray Martin (27 January 1943 – 14 August 2007) was a British documentary and docudrama filmmaker. He was a founding and lifelong member of Amber Film & Photography Collective, with whom he made many films including Seacoal (1985), In Fading Light (1989) and Eden Valley (1994).

== Life and work ==
Martin was born in Stoke-on-Trent and attended a grammar school there, Longton High School. He studied fine art at Newcastle University in the early 1960s; taught art history for a short while at Newcastle Polytechnic then in 1966 began studying filmmaking at Regent Street Polytechnic in London.

Martin along with photographer Sirkka-Liisa Konttinen and filmmaker Graham Denman, came together in London in 1968 around his vision to found Amber Film & Photography Collective. The group moved to Newcastle in 1969. Martin was instrumental in Amber making "40 films and 100 photographic narratives depicting working class and marginalised lives and landscapes in the north of England, and 100 more classic and contemporary photographic exhibitions through which the group explored the traditions and possibilities of documentary."

He died of a heart attack in 2007, aged 64. He was survived by his partner Ellin Hare, their son and a son from an earlier relationship.

== Films directed by Martin ==
(Note: Though all of Amber Films' works since Seacoal were officially collectively credited to Amber Production Team, rather than individually credited, the listed films have been described as directed by Martin.)

- Maybe (Amber, 1968) – with Graham Denman
- Seacoal (Amber, 1985)
- In Fading Light (Amber, 1989)
- Eden Valley (Amber, 1994)
