= Izabela Jedrzejczyk =

British documentary photographer (born 1953)

Izabela Jedrzejczyk (pronounced yen-jay-chik, born 1953), commonly anglicized as Isabella Jedrzejczyk, is a British documentary photographer. She has made work about the lives and landscapes of working-class communities, particularly in North East England. Her work is held in the collection of Side Gallery, Newcastle.

== Life and work ==
Jedrzejczyk was born in London. She studied at Nottingham Trent University in Nottingham, East Midlands, then in 1977 moved to Newcastle, Tyne and Wear, to work at Side Gallery.

For Side Gallery, Jedrzejczyk worked on various documentary projects. In 1979, she produced Urban Landscapes, a series of images predominantly from Newcastle and North Tyneside's urban environment. It was commissioned as part of the North Tyneside Survey, an initiative by North Tyneside Metropolitan Council to document the area during a period of significant change. In 1980, she made portraits of locals and visiting ships' crews at the Northumberland Arms, a pub on North Shields fish quay in Tyneside known as "The Jungle". In the early 1980s, she produced the series For Druridge with John Davies—landscapes of part of the Northumberland coastline at risk from plans to develop a nuclear power station. Also in the early 1980s, she created a series of rural Northumberland Landscapes.

== Publications ==
=== Publications by Jedrzejczyk ===
- Jungle Portraits. Flow Photographic Gallery Catalogue 3. Flow; Independent Publishing Network, 2021. ISBN 1800682654. With an essay by Alex Schneideman.

=== Publications with contributions by Jedrzejczyk ===
- Striking Women: Communities and Coal. London: Pluto, 1986. Photographs by Jedrzejczyk, Raissa Page, Brenda Prince, and Imogen Young. ISBN 9780745301549. With essays by Siân James and Angela V. John.

== Exhibitions ==
=== Solo or two-person exhibitions ===
- Citizens of Our Time, Side Gallery, Newcastle, April–June 2022. Paired with Gary Calton.
- From the Earth Comes Light, National Coal Mining Museum for England, Caphouse Colliery, Overton, Wakefield. Paired with Sirkka-Liisa Konttinen.

=== Group exhibitions ===
- Striking Women: Communities & Coal, The Photographers' Gallery, London, September–October 1985. With work by Jedrzejczyk, Raissa Page, Brenda Prince and Imogen Young.
- Women by Women, Baltic Centre for Contemporary Art, Newcastle, 2018. With work by Sirkka-Liisa Konttinen, Karen Robinson, Tish Murtha, Markéta Luskačová, and Jedrzejczyk's Jungle Portraits. Curated by Konttinen. Part of the Idea of North season.
- Light Years: The Photographers' Gallery at 50, The Photographers' Gallery, London, June 2021 – February 2022

== Collections ==
Jedrzejczyk's work is held in the following permanent collections:

- Science Museum Group, UK
- Side Gallery, Newcastle (Jungle Portraits and Urban Landscapes)
