= William Astbury =

English biochemist

William Astbury FRS
- Born: William Thomas Astbury; 25 February 1898; Longton, England
- Died: 4 June 1961 (aged 63); Leeds, England
- Education: University of Cambridge
- Known for: β-sheet Fiber diffraction X-ray diffraction of DNA
- Relatives: Norman Frederick Astbury (brother)
- Awards: Actonian Prize (1935); Croonian Medal (1945)
- Scientific career
- Fields: Physics, Molecular biology
- Workplaces: University College London; Royal Institution; University of Leeds
- Doctoral advisor: William Henry Bragg

William Thomas Astbury FRS (25 February 1898 – 4 June 1961) was an English physicist and molecular biologist who made pioneering X-ray diffraction studies of biological molecules. His work on keratin provided the foundation for Linus Pauling's discovery of the α-helix. He also studied the structure for DNA in 1937 and made the first step in the elucidation of its structure.

== Early life ==
Astbury was the fourth child of seven, born in Longton, Stoke-on-Trent. His father, William Edwin Astbury, was a potter and provided comfortably for his family. Astbury also had a younger brother, Norman, with whom he shared a love of music.

Astbury might well have become a potter but, luckily, won a scholarship to Longton High School, where his interests were shaped by the Headmaster and second master, both chemists. After becoming head boy and winning the Duke of Sutherland's gold medal, Astbury won the only local scholarship available and went up to Jesus College, Cambridge.

After two terms at Cambridge, his studies were interrupted by service during the First World War. A poor medical rating following appendectomy resulted in his posting in 1917 to Cork, Ireland with the Royal Army Medical Corps. He later returned to Cambridge and finished his last year with a specialization in physics.

== Academic career ==
After graduating from Cambridge, Astbury worked with William Bragg, first at University College London and then, in 1923, at the Davy-Faraday Laboratory at the Royal Institution in London. Fellow students included many eminent scientists, including Kathleen Lonsdale and J. D. Bernal and others. Astbury showed great enthusiasm for his studies and published papers in the journal Classic Crystallography, such as on the structure of tartaric acid.

In 1928, Astbury was appointed Lecturer in Textile Physics at the University of Leeds. He remained at Leeds for the remainder of his career, being appointed Reader in Textile Physics in 1937 and Professor of Biomolecular Structure in 1946. He held the chair until his death in 1961. He was elected a Fellow of the Royal Society (FRS) in 1940. He is commemorated by the Astbury Centre for Structural Molecular Biology at Leeds.

In later life he was given many awards and honorary degrees.

== X-ray diffraction studies of fibrous proteins ==
At Leeds Astbury studied the properties of fibrous substances such as keratin and collagen with funding from the textile industry. (Wool consists of keratin.) These substances did not produce sharp patterns of spots like crystals, but the patterns provided physical limits on any proposed structures. In the early 1930s, Astbury showed that there were drastic changes in the diffraction of moist wool or hair fibres as they are stretched significantly (100%). The data suggested that the unstretched fibres had a coiled molecular structure with a characteristic repeat of 5.1 Å (=0.51 nm). Astbury proposed that (1) the unstretched protein molecules formed a helix (which he called the α-form); and (2) the stretching caused the helix to uncoil, forming an extended state (which he called the β-form). Although incorrect in their details, Astbury's models were correct in essence and correspond to modern elements of secondary structure, the α-helix and the β-strand (Astbury's nomenclature was kept), which were developed twenty years later by Linus Pauling and Robert Corey in 1951. Hans Neurath was the first to show that Astbury's models could not be correct in detail, because they involved clashes of atoms. Neurath's paper and Astbury's data inspired H. S. Taylor (1941,1942) and Maurice Huggins (1943) to propose models of keratin that are very close to the modern α-helix.

In 1931, Astbury was also the first to propose that mainchain-mainchain hydrogen bonds (i.e., hydrogen bonds between the backbone amide groups) contributed to stabilizing protein structures. His initial insight was taken up enthusiastically by several researchers, including Linus Pauling.

Astbury's work moved on to include X-ray studies of many proteins (including myosin, epidermin and fibrin) and he was able to deduce from their diffraction patterns that the molecules of these substances were coiled and folded. This work led him to the conviction that the best way to understand the complexity of living systems was through studying the shape of the giant macromolecules from which they are made – an approach which he popularised with passion as 'molecular biology'. His other great passion was classical music and once said that protein fibres such as keratin in wool were 'the chosen instruments on which nature has played so many incomparable themes, and countless variations and harmonies' These two passions converged when in 1960 he presented an X-ray image taken by his research assistant Elwyn Beighton of a fibre of keratin protein in a lock of hair that was said to have come from Mozart – who was one of Astbury's favourite composers.

But proteins were not the only biological fibre that Astbury studied. In 1937 Torbjörn Caspersson of Sweden sent him well prepared samples of DNA from calf thymus. The fact that DNA produced a diffraction pattern indicated that it also had a regular structure and it might be feasible to deduce it. Astbury was able to obtain some external funding, and he employed the crystallographer Florence Bell. She recognised that the "beginnings of life [were] clearly associated with the interaction of proteins and nucleic acids". Bell and Astbury published an X-ray study on DNA in 1938, describing the nucleotides as a "Pile of Pennies".

Astbury and Bell reported that DNA's structure repeated every 2.7 nanometres and that the bases lay flat, stacked, 0.34 nanometres apart. At a symposium in 1938 at Cold Spring Harbor, Astbury pointed out that the 0.34 nanometre spacing was the same as amino acids in polypeptide chains. (The currently accepted value for the spacing of the bases in B-form of DNA is 0.332nm.)

In 1946 Astbury presented a paper at a symposium in Cambridge in which he said: "Biosynthesis is supremely a question of fitting molecules or parts of molecules against another, and one of the great biological developments of our time is the realisation that probably the most fundamental interaction of all is that between the proteins and the nucleic acids." He also said that the spacing between the nucleotides and the spacing of amino acids in proteins "was not an arithmetical accident".

Astbury and Bell's work was significant for two reasons. Firstly they showed that X-ray crystallography could be used to reveal the regular, ordered structure of DNA – an insight which laid the foundations for the later work of Maurice Wilkins and Rosalind Franklin, after which the structure of DNA was identified by Francis Crick and James D. Watson in 1953. Secondly, they did this work at a time when most scientists thought that proteins were the carrier of hereditary information and that DNA was a dull monotonous molecule of little interest other than perhaps as a structural component. In 1944, Astbury was one of the few scientists to recognise the importance of work done by the microbiologist Oswald Avery and his Rockefeller colleagues Maclyn McCarty and Colin Macleod. Avery and his team had shown that nucleic acid could pass on the property of virulence in pneumococcus and thus offered the first strong evidence that DNA might be the hereditary material.

Astbury described Avery's work as 'one of the most remarkable discoveries of our time' and it inspired him with the vision that, in the aftermath of World War 2, he would established a new department at Leeds that would become a national centre to blaze the trail for the new science of molecular biology. Writing to the Vice-Chancellor of the University of Leeds in 1945 he declared that 'all biology, is now passing over into the molecular structural phase...In all branches of biology and all universities this thing must come to pass and I suggest that Leeds should be bold and help to lead the way.'

Sadly, not everyone shared his dream. The University Senate allowed him to establish a new department but would not allow him to use the phrase 'molecular biology' in the title due to opposition from senior biologists who felt that, as a physicist, Astbury was encroaching without invitation on intellectual territory that they rightfully considered to be their own. The Senate also granted him premises but these were a far cry from what he had hoped for. His new department was housed in a Victorian terraced house that required substantial conversion, with uneven floors that made delicate scientific equipment wobble, a faulty electrical supply and unreliable plumbing that sometimes led to flooding. To add to his woes, the Medical Research Council rejected his application for funding.

Despite these set-backs, two important developments took place in Astbury's new department. The first was the elucidation of the mechanism by which thrombin acts as a protease to catalyse the formation of the major component of blood clots, the insoluble protein fibrin, from its soluble precursor fibrinogen by Laszlo Lorand, a young PhD student who had fled his native Hungary to join Astbury. Lorand's work was a major discovery in our understanding of the process by which blood clots form.

The second development was a series of new X-ray photographs of B-form DNA taken in 1951 by Astbury's research assistant Elwyn Beighton which the historian of science, Professor Robert Olby has since said was 'clearly the famous B-pattern found by Rosalind Franklin and R. Gosling'. Olby was referring to an X-ray image of B-form DNA that was taken a year later by Rosalind Franklin and her PhD student Raymond Gosling at King's College a year later which came to be known as 'Photo 51' Despite its modest name this image was to play an important role in the story of DNA and a plaque on the wall outside King's College, London hails it as 'one of the most important photographs in the world'. This is because the image shows a striking cross-shaped pattern of black spots made by X-rays as they are scattered by the DNA fibre and when James Watson was first shown Franklin and Gosling's picture, this cross-shaped pattern made him so excited that he said 'my mouth fell open and my pulse began to race', because he knew that only a molecule coiled into a helical shape could scatter X-rays to give this particular pattern.

Franklin and Gosling's 'Photo 51' provided one of several important clues to Watson and Crick -but Astbury's response to Beighton's very similar X-ray images of DNA could not have been more different. He never published them in a journal or presented them at a scientific meeting. Given that Astbury was such a renowned expert in X-ray studies of biological molecules this apparent neglect of such an important clue may seem surprising. One explanation is that, although Astbury recognised the importance of DNA, he did not understand that biological information was carried in the one-dimensional sequence of bases within the molecule but rather, that it resided in subtle and elaborate variations in its three-dimensional structure. Far from making his jaw drop and his pulse race, the revelation that DNA was a simple a twisting helix would therefore have been a disappointment but it is intriguing to speculate on how differently history might have unfolded had Astbury shown Beighton's image to his friend and colleague the eminent US chemist and Nobel Laureate, Linus Pauling when he visited Astbury at his home in Headingley, Leeds in 1952. Pauling was, at that time, Watson and Crick's greatest rival in trying to solve the structure of DNA and was desperate to obtain a good quality X-ray diffraction image of DNA. In 1952, he had already proposed an incorrect model of DNA based on Astbury and Bell's early work but had Astbury shown Pauling these new images taken by Beighton, it might well have been Caltech, Pasadena and not Cambridge, UK that is today remembered for the discovery of the double-helix. Despite this missed opportunity, Astbury, together with Florence Bell, had made a major contribution by showing that the methods of X-ray crystallography could be used to reveal the regular, ordered structure of DNA.

But perhaps Astbury's greatest scientific legacy was his rather unusual overcoat. In the late 1930s Astbury and his collaborators A.C. Chibnall and Kennet Bailey showed that by chemical treatment, the molecular chains of soluble seed proteins could be refolded to make them into insoluble fibres. The company ICI was so interested in this idea that they built a pilot production plant in Scotland to a new textile fibre called 'Ardil' that was produced by deliberately altering the molecular structure of the main soluble protein component of monkeynuts to refold it into an insoluble fibre in the hope of using this as a cheap and abundant substitute for wool as a raw material in the textile industry. To demonstrate the feasibility of this idea, ICI made an entire overcoat from Ardil which Astbury regularly sported to lectures and in the end, although Ardil did not prove to be the salvation of the British textile industry, it did serve as a powerful illustration of Astbury's conviction that not only could we solve the structure of giant biomolecules such as proteins and DNA using X-rays, but that we might also then deliberately manipulate these structures for our own practical purposes.

This was an idea which truly came of age in the mid- to late 1970s with the rise of recombinant DNA technology by which time Astbury was dead but as his friend and colleague, J.D.Bernal wrote in an obituary to him, 'His monument will be found in the whole of molecular biology'.

== Personal qualities and history ==
Astbury was known for his unfailing cheerfulness, idealism, imagination and enthusiasm. He foresaw correctly the tremendous impact of molecular biology and transmitted his vision to his students, "his euphoric evangelizing zeal transforming laboratory routine into a great adventure". Astbury's enthusiasm may also account for an occasional lack of scientific caution observable in his work; Astbury could make speculative interpretations sound plausible.

Astbury was an excellent writer and lecturer; his works are characterized by remarkable clarity and an easy-going, natural manner. He also enjoyed music, playing both piano and violin.

Astbury met Frances Gould when he was stationed in Cork, Ireland with the Royal Army Medical Corps during World War I. They married in 1922 and had a son, Bill, and a daughter, Maureen.

== See also ==
- Nucleic acid
