= Cliff Brittle =

English businessman and rugby union player

Benjamin Clifford "Cliff" Brittle (January 1942 – 11 September 2011) was an English businessman and former rugby union player who was the chairman of the Rugby Football Union from 1996 to 1998.

== Rugby career ==
Brittle was born in Leek, Staffordshire. He first played rugby as a student while at Longton High School, and as a senior played for Old Longtonians, Stoke-on-Trent and most notably for Sale. He also played county rugby for Staffordshire.In 1996 he took the post of Chairman of the Rugby Football Union, the year after the game of rugby union adopted professionalism. In his role of chairman, Brittle appointed Fran Cotton as vice-chairman who in turn recommended Clive Woodward as England head coach. Brittle's time in office was turbulent; he resisted attempts by club owners and the media to overpay players in a rushed attempt to cash in on the professional era. This caused Brittle to be vilified by sections of the media, and in 1998 Cotton resigned when Brittle was excluded from talks between the English clubs and the RFU.
