= Chris Killip =

Manx photographer (1946–2020)

- Born: Christopher David Killip; 11 July 1946; Douglas, Isle of Man
- Died: 13 October 2020 (aged 74)
- Notable work: In Flagrante (1988)
- Awards: Henri Cartier-Bresson Award, Henri Cartier-Bresson Foundation; 1989
- Website: www.chriskillip.com

Christopher David Killip (11 July 1946 – 13 October 2020) was a Manx photographer who worked at Harvard University from 1991 to 2017, as a Professor of Visual and Environmental Studies. Killip is known for his black and white images of people and places especially of Tyneside during the 1980s.

Killip received the Henri Cartier-Bresson Creation Award (for In Flagrante) and was shortlisted for the Deutsche Börse Photography Foundation Prize. He exhibited all over the world, wrote extensively, appeared on radio and television, and curated many exhibitions.

== Life and work ==
Killip was born in Douglas, Isle of Man; his parents ran the Highlander pub. He left school at 16 to work as a trainee hotel manager, while also working as a beach photographer. In 1964, aged 18, he moved to London where he worked as an assistant to the advertising photographer Adrian Flowers. He soon went freelance, along with periods working in his father's pub on the Isle of Man. In 1969, Killip ended his commercial work to concentrate on his own photography. The work from this time was eventually published by the Arts Council as Isle of Man: A Book about the Manx in 1980 with a text by John Berger. In 1972, he was commissioned by the Arts Council to photograph Bury St Edmunds and Huddersfield, and in 1975 he won a two-year fellowship from Northern Arts to photograph the northeast of England. He moved to Newcastle-upon-Tyne to pursue this work, to which Creative Camera devoted most of its May 1977 issue. (Note: In writing "Creative Camera magazine devoted an entire issue to his work in progress", Sean O'Hagan slightly exaggerates: the issue also includes a plate by Bill Brandt, potted descriptions of many books, and more.)

In 1977, Killip became a co-founder, exhibition curator, and advisor at the Side Gallery, Newcastle, and worked as its first director for 18 months. He produced a body of work from his photographs in the northeast of England, published in 1988 as In Flagrante with a text by Berger and Sylvia Grant. These black and white images, "portraits of Tyneside's working class communities amongst the signifiers of the region's declining industrial landscape", mostly made on 4×5 film, are now recognised as among the most important visual records of living in 1980s Britain. Gerry Badger describes the photographs as "taken from a point of view that opposed everything [Thatcher] stood for", and the book as "about community", "a dark, pessimistic journey".

The book In Flagrante was well received on its publication in 1988, but Killip's kind of black and white documentation of the underclass was going out of fashion quickly in Britain, as photographers used colour to show consumerism and for consciously and explicitly artistic purposes. In Flagrante was reproduced in February 2009 within one of Errata Editions' "Books on Books". In a review of this reproduction, Robert Ayers describes the original as "one of the greatest photography books ever published".

In 1988, Killip was commissioned by Pirelli UK to photograph its tyre factory in Burton; agreement on this was reached in April the next year, whereupon Killip started work. Attempting to use available light in a darkened factory in which work was done on a black product, he was at first unsuccessful, but in June he switched to flash and a large-format camera and photographed for three more months. The resulting work was exhibited in the Victoria and Albert Museum (London) in September 1989; it was published in book form by Ute Eskildsen/Steidl in 2007.

From 1992 until 2004, Killip photographed pilgrimages and other scenes in rural Ireland; the result was published in 2009 by Thames & Hudson as Here Comes Everybody.

In 1991, he moved to the USA, having been given a post at Harvard University as a visiting lecturer. He was made a tenured professor in 1994, and remained as a professor of visual and environmental studies until 2017.

Arbeit/Work was published by Steidl in 2012 to accompany Killip's retrospective exhibition at Museum Folkwang, Essen.

== Personal life ==
Killip had a son, Matthew, with the photographer Markéta Luskačová.

After his appointment to a post at Harvard, Killip lived in Cambridge, Massachusetts, for the rest of his life, in 2000 marrying Mary Halpenny, who also worked at Harvard.

Killip died on 13 October 2020 from lung cancer. He was 74.

== Exhibitions ==
=== Solo ===
- Two Views, Two Cities. Huddersfield and Bury St Edmunds, 1970s
- Seacoal, Side Gallery (Newcastle) and subsequent tour, 1984
- Another Country, Serpentine Gallery (London). Photographs of northeast England by Killip and Graham Smith, 1985
- Art Institute of Chicago, 1986
- In Flagrante, Victoria and Albert Museum (London) and subsequent tour of Europe, 1988
- Working at Pirelli, Victoria and Albert Museum (London), 1990
- Chris Killip Retrospective, Palais de Tokyo (Paris), 1991
- The Last Art Show, Jarrow Bede Gallery (Jarrow), 1996. Photographs of Jarrow.
- Chris Killip Photographs 1971–96, Manx Museum (Douglas), 1997
- Chris Killip: Sixty Photographs, Old Post Office (Berlin), 2000
- Les rencontres d'Arles festival, France.
- Arbeit/Work, Museum Folkwang (Essen, Germany), 2012. A retrospective.
- What Happened / Great Britain 1970–1990. Le Bal (Paris), May–August 2012.
- Now Then: Chris Killip and the making of "In Flagrante", J. Paul Getty Museum (Los Angeles), May–August 2017.
- The Last Ships, Laing Art Gallery (Newcastle on Tyne) (Note: "Chris Killip: The Last Ships Q&A" (three-minute video), Tyne and Wear Museums, hosted by Youtube.)
- The Station, Martin Parr Foundation (Bristol), September–December 2020.

=== Group ===
- The Art of Photography, 1839–1989, Royal Academy (London), 1989.
- In the Face of History: European Photographers in the 20th Century. Barbican Arts Centre, London, 2006.
- No Such Thing as Society: Photography in Britain 1968–1987, Hayward Gallery (London); Ujazdów Castle (Warsaw), November 2008 – January 2009; Tullie House (Carlisle), May–July 2008; and Aberystwyth Arts Centre (Aberystwyth), March–April 2008.
- Facts of Life / British Documentary Photography, Photomonth, National Museum, Kraków, August–November 2010. British photography 1974–1997.

== Publications ==
=== Books of works by Killip ===
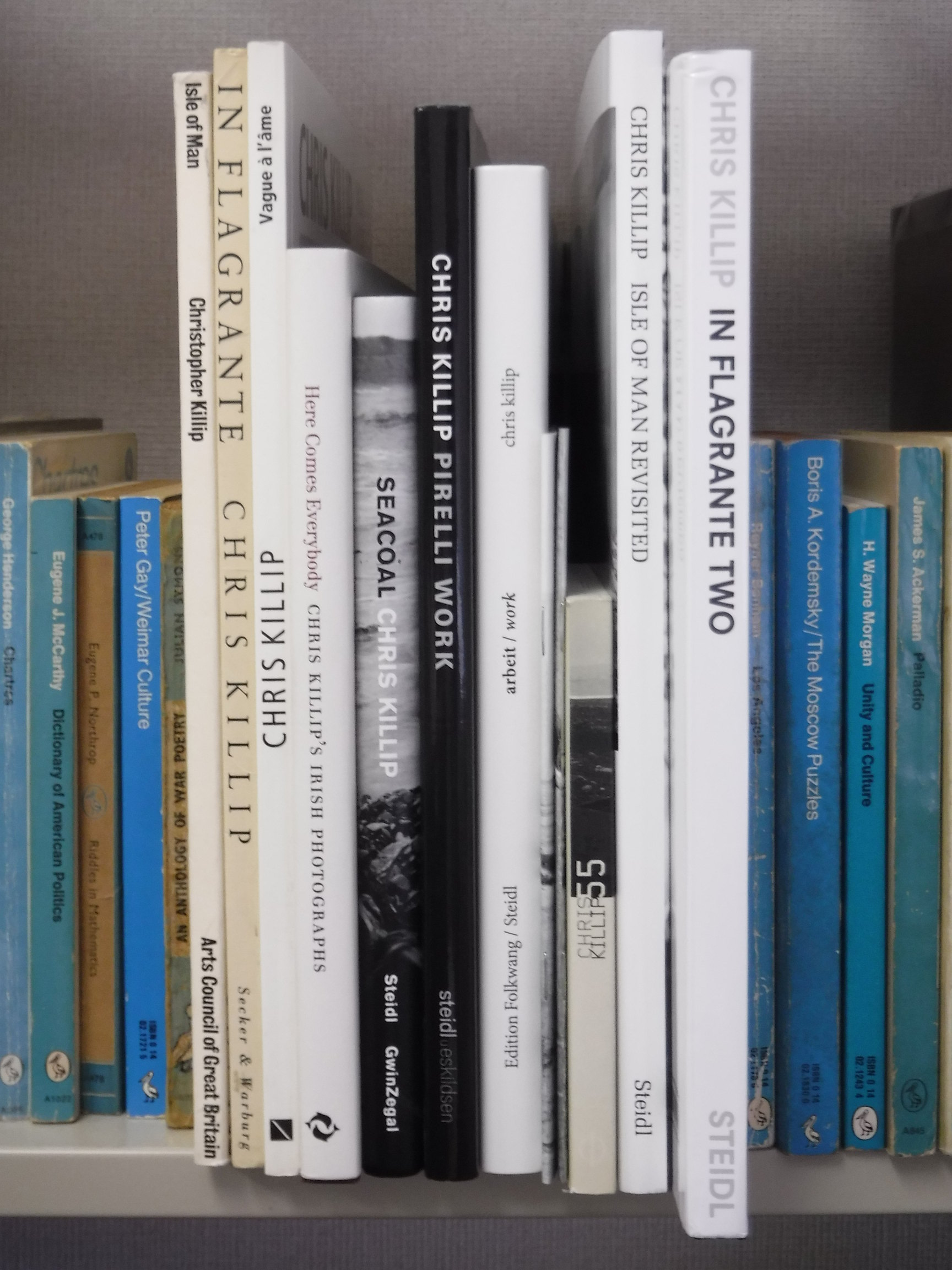
Photobooks by Killip (flanked by irrelevant Pelicans)

- The Isle of Man. New York: Witkin Gallery, 1973. Portfolio.
- Isle of Man: A Book about the Manx. London: Arts Council of Great Britain, 1980. (Distributed by Zwemmer.) ISBN 0-7287-0187-1 (hardback); ISBN 0-7287-0186-3 (paperback). Under the name Christopher Killip. With text by Killip and John Berger and quotations from various older sources.
- In Flagrante. London: Secker & Warburg, 1988. ISBN 0-436-23358-4 (hardback); ISBN 0-436-23356-8 (paperback). Text by John Berger and Sylvia Grant.
  - Vague à l'âme. Paris: Nathan, 1988. Text in French.
- Chris Killip 55. London: Phaidon, 2001. ISBN 0-7148-4028-9. Text by Gerry Badger.
- Pirelli Work. Göttingen: Steidl, 2007. ISBN 978-3-86930-961-3. (Note: Steidl's description of Pirelli Work is here.)
- Chris Killip: In Flagrante.
  - Books on Books 4. New York: Errata Editions, 2009. ISBN 978-1-935004-06-6. Reduced-size facsimile of the book of 1988, with an essay by Gerry Badger.
  - Books on Books 4. New York: Errata Editions, 2014. ISBN 978-1-935004-39-4.
- Here Comes Everybody: Chris Killip's Irish Photographs. London: Thames & Hudson, 2009. ISBN 978-0-500-54365-8.
- Seacoal. Göttingen: Steidl, 2011. ISBN 3-86930-256-9. (Note: Steidl's description of Seacoal is here.)
- Arbeit / Work. Essen: Museum Folkwang; Göttingen: Steidl, 2012. ISBN 978-3-86930-457-1. Text in German and English; (Note: Steidl's description of Arbeit / Work is here.) texts by Killip, David Campany and Ute Eskildsen. A retrospective.
- Isle of Man Revisited. Göttingen: Steidl, 2015. ISBN 978-3-86930-959-0. A second, expanded edition of Isle of Man: A Book about the Manx. (Note: Steidl's description of Isle of Man Revisited is here.)
- In Flagrante Two. Göttingen: Steidl, 2016. ISBN 978-3-86930-960-6. A second, larger-format edition of the photographs constituting the 1988 book, with two extra photographs. (Note: Steidl's description of In Flagrante Two is here.)
- The Station. Göttingen: Steidl, 2020. ISBN 978-3-95829-616-9. (Note: Steidl's description of The Station is here.)
- Chris Killip. London: Thames & Hudson, 2022. ISBN 978-0500025581. A retrospective.
- Skinningrove. London: Stanley/Barker, 2024.

=== Other publications by Killip ===
- "Chris Killip Photographs 1975–1976". London: Creative Camera, May 1977, number 155. Twenty-two plates, on pp. 150–171. (The title on the front cover is "Chris Killip Photographs 1975–1976 in the North East".)
- Askam-in-Furness 1982. Southport: Café Royal, 2017. Edition of 500 copies. A zine.
- Isle of Man TT Races 1971. Southport: Café Royal, 2018. Edition of 500 copies. (Note: Café Royal's description of Isle of Man TT Races 1971 is here Archived 18 July 2019 at the Wayback Machine.)
- The Station. London: Ponybox. ISBN 9781999668709. 32-page tabloid newsprint publication.
- The Last Ships. London: Ponybox. ISBN 9781999668716. 28-page tabloid newsprint publication.
- Portraits. London: Ponybox. ISBN 9781999668723. 32-page tabloid newsprint publication.
- Skinningrove. London: Ponybox. ISBN 9781999668730. 32-page tabloid newsprint publication.
- Huddersfield 1974. Southport: Café Royal, 2019. Edition of 500 copies. (Note: Café Royal's description of Huddersfield 1974 is here Archived 18 July 2019 at the Wayback Machine.)
- The Seaside 1975–1981. Southport: Café Royal, 2020. Edition of 500 copies. (Note: Café Royal's description of The Seaside 1975–1981 is here Archived 22 March 2020 at the Wayback Machine.)
- Shipbuilding on Tyneside 1975–1976. Southport: Café Royal, 2020. (Note: Café Royal's description of Shipbuilding on Tyneside 1975–1976 is here Archived 2 September 2020 at the Wayback Machine.)
- Chris Killip. Southport: Café Royal, 2020. Boxed set of the five booklets previously published by Café Royal. (Note: Café Royal's description of Chris Killip is here.)

== Awards ==
- 1989: Henri Cartier-Bresson Award, from the Henri Cartier-Bresson Foundation, Paris for In Flagrante
- 2013: Shortlisted, Deutsche Börse Photography Foundation Prize, for his exhibition What Happened – Great Britain 1970–1990 at Le Bal in Paris.
- 2020: Dr. Erich Salomon Award from the German Society for Photography, Cologne.

== Collections ==
Killip's work is held in the following permanent collections:

- Government Art Collection, UK: 3 prints (as of October 2020)
- Museum of Modern Art, New York: 20 prints (as of October 2020)
- National Gallery of Australia, Canberra, Australia: 12 prints (as of October 2020)
- Stedelijk Museum Amsterdam, Amsterdam: 4 prints (as of October 2020)
- Tate, UK: 80 prints (as of October 2020)
- Victoria and Albert Museum, London: 93 prints (as of October 2020), including the 69 prints used for Isle of Man.
