= Sirkka-Liisa Konttinen =

Finnish-British photographer

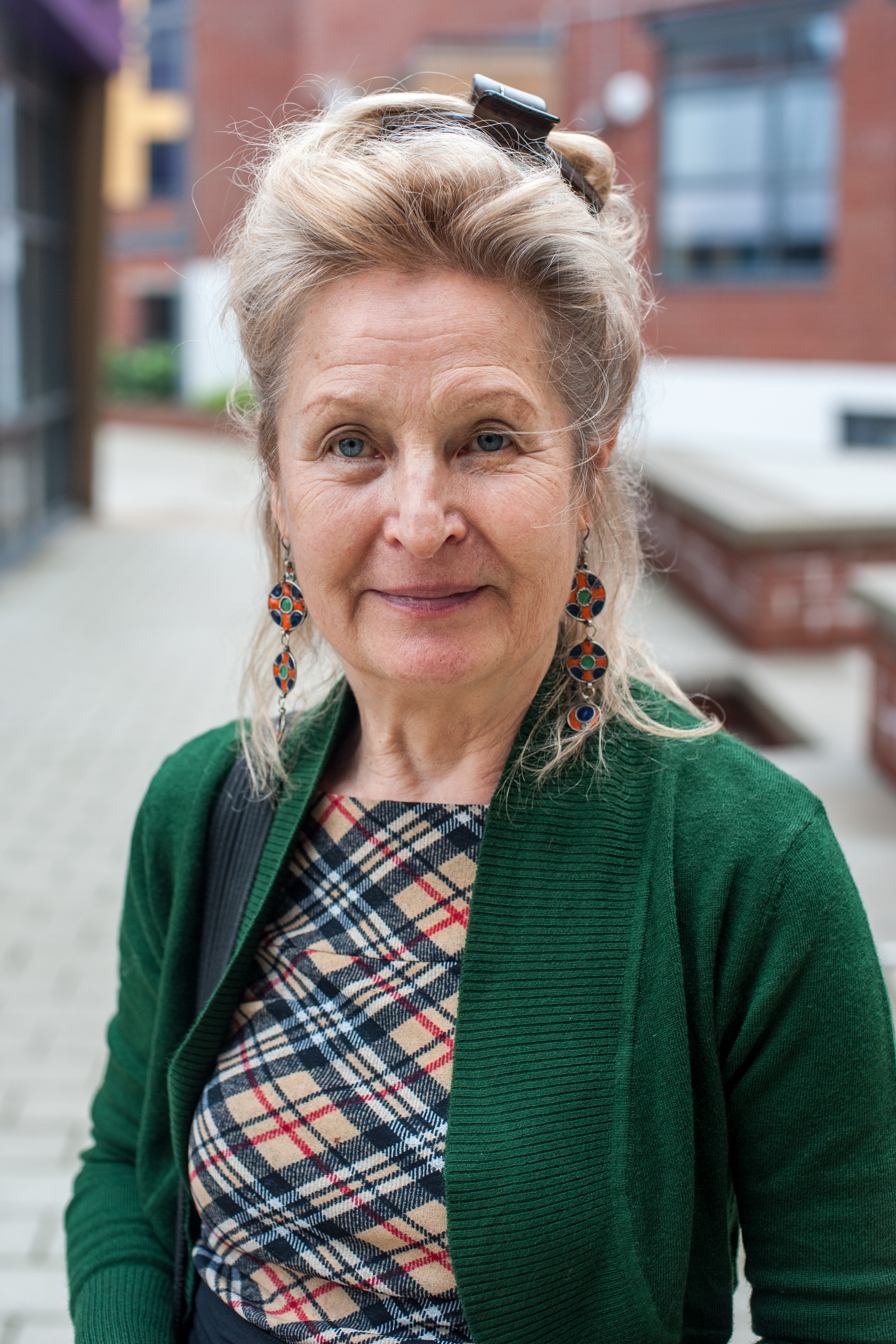
Konttinen in 2018

Sirkka-Liisa Roberts MBE (née Konttinen; born in 1948) is a Finnish photographer who has worked in Britain since the 1960s. Her work is held in the collections of the Museum of Fine Arts, Houston, National Gallery of Art, Washington, D.C., Tate and the UK Memory of the World Register.

== Life and work ==
Konttinen was born in Myllykoski, municipality of Sippola (from 1975 part of the town of Anjalankoski, from 2009 part of the town of Kouvola), Finland in 1948. Konttinen became interested in photography at the age of 12 and was a member of a photography group in a nearby town. Intending to pursue photography as a career, she was apprenticed to a fashion photographer in Helsinki for a year. Konttinen studied photography in London in the 1960s, and cofounded the Amber collective, which moved to the northeast of England in 1969.

From 1969 Konttinen lived in Byker, and for about a decade photographed and interviewed the residents of this area of terraced houses until her own house was demolished. She continued to work there for some time afterwards. This resulted in the book Byker, which in David Alan Mellor's words "bore witness to her intimate embeddedness in the locality". In 1980 she became the first photographer since the Cultural Revolution to have her work exhibited by the British Council in China.

Konttinen's next project was a study of girls attending dance schools in North Shields, their mothers, and the schools. The book Step by Step came from this. The book was an influence for the film Billy Elliot.

Three years of photographing the beach between Seaham and Hartlepool resulted in the series "Coal Coast".

Konttinen later returned to Byker and photographed its new residents in colour.

== Publications ==
- Byker. London: Jonathan Cape, 1983. ISBN 0-224-02109-5.
  - Byker. Newcastle: Bloodaxe, 1985. ISBN 0-906427-90-8.
  - Byker. Stockport: Dewi Lewis, 2022. ISBN 978-1-911306-85-6. Revised and expanded edition. (Note: Byker on the publisher's website.)
- Step by Step. Newcastle: Bloodaxe, 1989. ISBN 1-85224-059-8.
- Writing in the Sand: On the Beaches of North East England. Stockport: Dewi Lewis, 2001. ISBN 1-899235-97-3.
  - Écrit dans le sable: sur les plages du Nord-Est de l'Angleterre. Paris: Schultz, 2000. ISBN 91-87370-30-1. (in French)
  - Skrivet i sanden: på sandstränderna i nordöstra England. Stockholm: Schultz Forlag, 2000. ISBN 91-87370-26-3. (in Swedish)
  - Hiekkaan kirjoitettu: Koillis-Englannin rannoilla. Oulu: Kustantamo Pohjoinen, 2000. ISBN 951-749-340-1. (in Finnish)
  - Writing in the Sand: On the Beaches of North East England. Stockport: Dewi Lewis, 2025. ISBN 978-1-916915-13-8. Revised and expanded edition. (Note: Writing in the Sand on the publisher's website.)
- The Coal Coast. Newcastle: Amberside, 2003. ISBN 0-9512058-1-1.
- Byker Revisited. Newcastle: Northumberland University Press, 2009. ISBN 978-1-904794-42-4.
- Thomas Kennedy. Sirkka-Liisa Konttinen. Tate Photography. London: Tate, 2022. ISBN 978-1849768009. (Note: Sirkka-Liisa Konttinen on the publisher's website.)

== Exhibitions ==
- Documents of the North East (with Graham Smith, James Cleet, and Robert Carling), Side Gallery, Newcastle, 1977
- Photographs from the Beaches (with Markéta Luskačová), Side Gallery, Newcastle, 1978
- North Tyneside (with Izabela Jedrzejczyk, Markéta Luskačová and Graham Smith), Side Gallery, Newcastle, 1981
- Byker, Side Gallery, Newcastle, 1983
- Cedarwood Woman, Side Gallery, Newcastle, 1988
- Step by Step, Side Gallery, Newcastle, 1989; touring, 1990, 1992
- The Writing in the Sand, Side Gallery, Newcastle, 1991; touring 1993
- Dream On (with Steve Conlan and Richard Grassick), Side Gallery, Newcastle, 1992
- My Finnish Roots, Side Gallery, Newcastle and touring, 1993, 1994
- Quayside (with Graham Smith), Side Gallery, Newcastle and touring, 1993
- Writing in the Sand, Side Gallery, Newcastle, 2000
- Coalfield Stories (with Dean Chapman, John Davies, Martin Figura, Peter Fryer, Richard Grassick, Sally-Ann Norman, Keth Pattison, Bruce Rae, Chris Steele-Perkins), Side Gallery, Newcastle, 2002/3
- Coal Coast, Baltic Centre for Contemporary Art, Gateshead, 2003
- Coalfield Stories (with John Davies and Simon Norfolk), Photofusion, London, 2005/6
- Byker Revisited, Side Gallery, Newcastle, 2009
- Byker, L. Parker Stephenson Photographs, New York, 2013
- Step by Step, L. Parker Stephenson Photographs, New York City, 2017
- Living Cities (with Kader Attia, Mark Bradford, Julie Mehretu, Boris Mikhailov, Marwan Rechmaoui, and Nil Yalter), Tate Modern, London, 2017. Included 17 photographs by Konttinen.
- Women by Women exhibition curated by Konttinen as part of Idea of North exhibition, Baltic Centre for Contemporary Art, Gateshead, UK, 2018

== Awards ==
- Grand Prix at the Melbourne International Film Festival (1992) for the film The Writing in the Sand.
- Prix du Documentaire, Cinéma du Réel, Paris (1992) for the film The Writing in the Sand
- Honorary Fellowship, The Royal Photographic Society (2024)

== Collections ==
Konttinen's work is held in the following permanent collections:

- Museum of Fine Arts, Houston: 1 print (as of 6 November 2022)
- National Gallery of Art, Washington, D.C.: 3 prints (as of 6 November 2022)
- Tate, UK: 24 prints (as of 6 November 2022)
- UK Memory of the World Register: Konttinen's photography of the northeast of England from 1969 to 2009, and Amber's related films
