= Side Gallery =

Photography gallery in Newcastle upon Tyne

- Former name: Side Gallery and Cinema
- Established: 1977
- Location: 5-9 Side, Newcastle upon Tyne, NE1 3JE
- Type: Registered charity
- Collections: "an extensive documentary record of the region"
- Collection size: 20,000 photographs; 10,000 slides; 100 films; 6TB digital assets
- Founders: Murray Martin, Sirkka-Liisa Konttinen, Graham Smith, plus Graham Denman, Peter Roberts and Lorna Powers
- Curator: Kerry Lowes
- Owner: Amber Film & Photography Collective
- Website: amber-online.com/side-gallery/

Side Gallery is a photography gallery in Newcastle upon Tyne, run by Amber Film & Photography Collective. It opened in 1977 as Side Gallery and Cinema with a remit to show humanist photography "both by and commissioned by the group along with work it found inspirational". It is the only venue in the UK dedicated to documentary photography. Side Gallery is located at Amber's base in Side, a street in Quayside, Newcastle near the Tyne Bridge.

Side Gallery closed on 9 April 2023 after the loss of its Arts Council England National Portfolio Organisation status and funding in November 2022, combined with rising energy bills. It launched a fundraising campaign which closed on 30 May 2023 to help it work towards reopening in 2024.

== History ==
The inaugural exhibition was titled Documents in the North East and showed the work of four documentary photographers: Robert Hamilton Carling, James Henry Cleet, Sirkka-Liisa Konttinen and Graham Smith.

In 1978, Henri Cartier-Bresson had a retrospective exhibition at Side.

In 2015 the gallery closed for a year and a half for major redevelopment, reopening in September 2016. A second exhibition space was added, as well as a library, and study centre / social space with digital access to the collection.

Side Gallery closed on 9 April 2023 after a reduction in Arts Council England funding, combined with rising energy bills. It launched a fundraising campaign to raise £60,000 so it could work towards reopening in 2024.

== Directors ==
- Ron McCormack (September 1976 – June 1977).
- Murray Martin (interim June 1977 – late 1977).
- Chris Killip (late 1977 – 1979).

== Exhibitions ==
- 1977. until 13 February. Documents in the North East. Featuring work from Robert Hamilton Carling, James Henry Cleet, Sirkka-Liisa Konttinen and Graham Smith.
- 1977. until 13 March. Singular Realities. Curated by Gerry Badger. Showing work from Lewis Ambler, Kurt Benning, John Blakemore, Beverly Bryon, Eric Carpenter, Paul Hill, Isabella Jedrzejscyk, Paul Joyce, Guy Ryecart, Paddy Summerfield, Gail Tandy and Peter Turner.
- 1977. until 10 April. New York in the Thirties – The photographs of Berenice Abbott.
- 1977. until 8 May. A Vision of Paris – The photographs of Eugene Atget and Viva – The photographs of Claude Raimond-Dityvon, Yves Jean-mougin, Herve Gloaguen, Martine Franck, François Hers, Michel Dulluc and Jacques Minassian.

== Collection ==
The gallery's collection includes "an extensive documentary record of the region" as well as work by Sirkka-Liisa Konttinen, Russell Lee, Lewis Hine, and Susan Meiselas. Some of the gallery's exhibitions that are held in its collection include Tish Murtha's Juvenile Jazz Bands (1979), Konttinen's Step by Step (1984), Dean Chapman's Shifting Ground (2001) and Karen Robinson's All Dressed Up (2005).
