= Eden Valley (film) =

- Video cover
- Directed by: Amber Production Team
- Written by: Amber Production Team
- Produced by: Amber Production Team
- Starring: Brian Hogg; Darren Bell
- Cinematography: Amber Production Team
- Edited by: Amber Production Team
- Music by: Amber Production Team; Alisdair Robertson; Graham Raine
- Distributed by: M.D. Wax Courier Films; Amber Films
- Release date: 19 January 1996
- Running time: 95 minutes
- Country: United Kingdom
- Language: English

Eden Valley is a 1994 British drama film conceived, written, produced, directed, photographed and edited by the Amber Production Team.

== Plot ==
The film is set within a harness racing fraternity and explores the conflict between urban and rural values through the medium of an evolving relationship between father and son.

The main character in the film, Hoggy, abandoned his wife and son ten years earlier to establish himself in an alternative lifestyle, living in a caravan and caring for his horses. The world gets turned upside down by the arrival of his teenage son, who has a prison sentence hanging over him. Billy has lived his life on an inner-city housing estate, and in his lifestyle theft and drugs are the norm. Using dramatic seasonal changes within the horse-trainer's environment the film follows the development of this fragile relationship. Both father's and son's value systems are tested, with dramatic consequences.

== Cast ==
- Brian Hogg as Hoggy
- Darren Bell as Billy Hogg
- Mike Elliot as Danker
- Jimmy Killeen as Probation Officer
- Wayne Buck as Young Lad
- Kevin Buck as Young Lad
- John Middleton as Townie Husband
- Charlie Hardwick as Townie Wife
- Katja Roberts as Townie Daughter

== Production ==
The roots of the film lie in the making of Seacoal, which was released in 1985. This film depicted the lives of seacoalers on the Northumberland coast, and introduced members of Amber to a passion for horses, and the addictive pursuit of harness racing. The Laidler family, who were featured in Seacoal, proved to have a profound impact. It was they who talked some members of the Amber Production Team into buying their first horse, taught them the rudiments of training and driving, and encouraged their bartering and re-cycling skills. The Laidlers wove the web that pulled Amber into the activity, and secured entry into their environment and the world of harness racing.

Amber's method of working is based on building long-term relationships within communities. Their aim is to enter into people's lives in a way that provides an authenticity to film-making that goes beyond simple realism. After becoming established in the harness racing community, Amber introduced actor Brian Hogg into it. His character, Hoggy, was developed over a period during which Brian immersed himself in the lifestyle, contributed to the development of the script, and participated in other essential tasks such as set building and horse training.

In contrast, Darren Bell, who played Billy, his son, came directly into his first film role from a background of life on an inner-city housing estate. The film was shot sequentially to facilitate Billy's introduction into an initially alien environment and to reflect on the story of Billy. The film schedule spanned a twelve-month period. We worked with a small crew, two main characters and considerable good will from the harness racing community.

== Amber Credits Policy ==
Amber Films introduced a policy of collective crediting of its films with the release of Seacoal in 1985. Amber argues that "all Amber members are involved in all the different areas of operation". Whilst individual members eventually take on specific roles – director, sound recordist, cinematographer – during specific productions, the project's ongoing development is collectively owned by all those involved. Amber therefore credit their films collectively, rather than singling out individuals for roles in the production that are deemed socially superior by conventional society.

== Awards ==
- 1995: Créteil International Women's Film Festival Grand Prix (Amber Production Team)

== See also ==
- List of films about horse racing
