= Amber Film & Photography Collective =

English film and photography collective

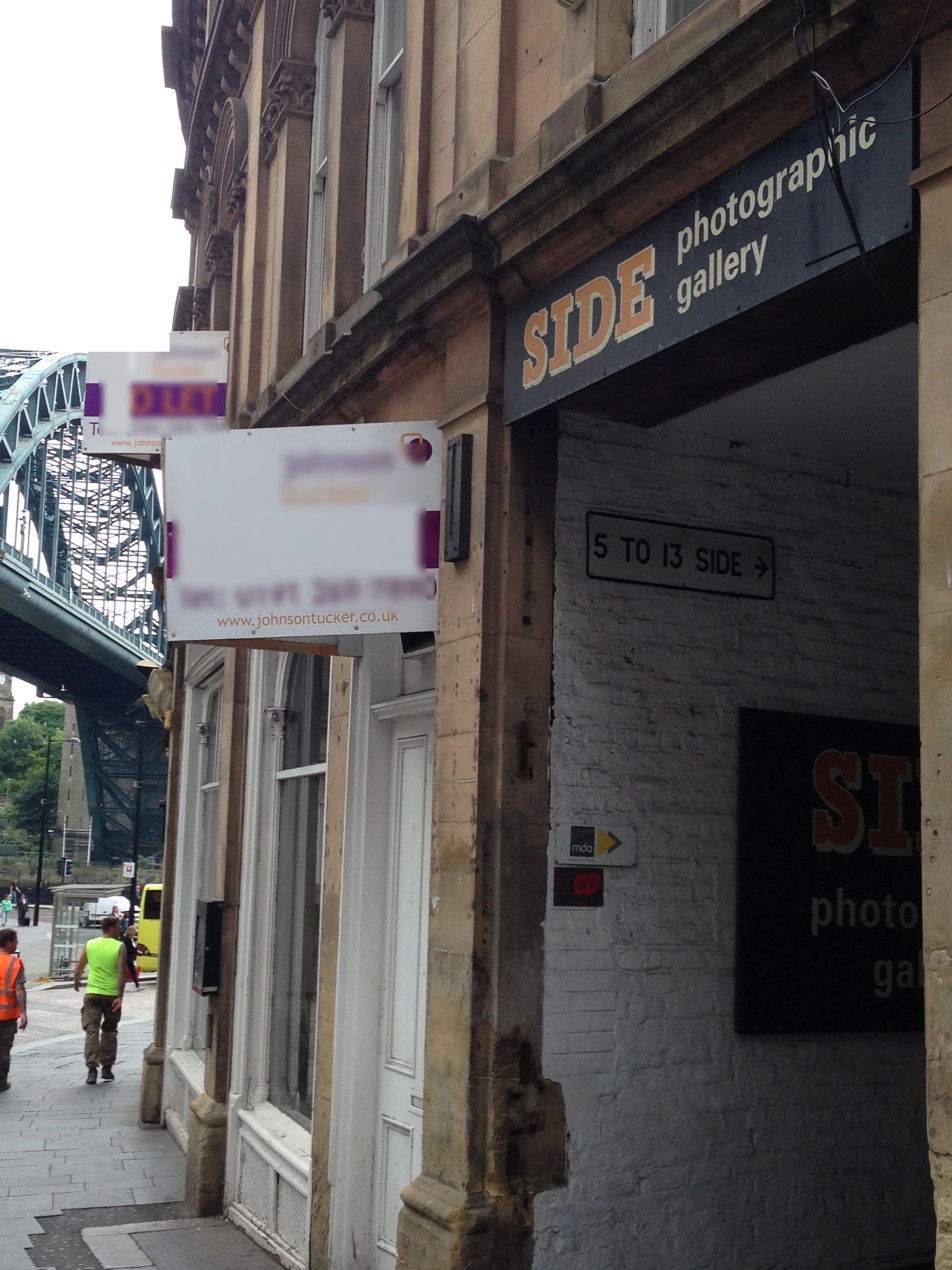
- The entrance to Side Gallery in Newcastle upon Tyne, looking towards the Quayside and Tyne Bridge
- Type: Collective
- Industry: Film, photography, exhibitions
- Founded: 1968; 58 years ago
- Headquarters: The Side, Quayside, Newcastle upon Tyne
- Website: amber-online.com

Amber Film & Photography Collective (often shortened to Amber Films or Amber) is a film and photography collective based in Newcastle upon Tyne with an aim to capture working-class life in North East England. Often combining professional and non-professional actors, Amber has produced several documentary and feature films of varying lengths, sometimes blending documentary with fiction. Their productions have included Seacoal and Eden Valley, along with a drama-documentary about 1960s Newcastle City Council leader, T. Dan Smith.

Although Amber have received little national attention, scholar Mike Wayne suggests they are "possibly the most successful 'studio' -- in terms of sheer longevity -- in British film history".

The collective often host exhibitions related to their current projects at their base at Side Gallery and Cinema, just off the Quayside in Newcastle.

== History ==
=== Foundation ===
Amber was founded in 1968 by film and photography students at London's Regent Street Polytechnic, and moved to Tyneside a year later with the aim of documenting life in North East England. Established to document cultural, political and economic changes in the region, Amber Films member Graeme Rigby said that the founders "may be [...] didn't realise the extent of the changes that were coming, but that is what has been captured."

The collective opened Side Gallery just off Newcastle's Quayside in 1977 to serve as their base, and developed a relationship with many European photographers. Scholars David Crouch and Richard Grassick write, "Amber's work argues for a long-term commitment to communities, encouraging active participation in the production process by those being filmed." Along with similar collectives in other British cities, committed to working outside of the commercial industry, they were awarded grants from bodies such as the British Film Institute and the Regional Arts Associations. Amber benefitted from the Association of Cinematograph Television and Allied Technicians (ACTT) Workshop Agreement of 1984 gave financial and structural stability to filmmakers operating outside of the mainstream.

The collective's first film, about the 1968 anti-war demonstration in Grosvenor Square, was banned by students' unions because it was considered to be an incitement to violence. The collective paid themselves £5 a week, and set about to record working-class life which, founding member Murray Martin told The Guardian, had been banned from the works of earlier, celebrated documentarians such as John Grierson.

Produced in 1969, Amber's first film in Tyneside was a 10-minute documentary on the Shields Ferry across the River Tyne. Although the BBC argued that the theme song was "unintelligible", the collective refused to change their work, and, thus, the film was never broadcast.

=== 1970s and 1980s ===
During the 1970s, the collective produced more documentaries, financially supported by the regional funding body Northern Arts. Productions included Mai, about an Irish-Indian anarchist; Last Shift, about a traditional brick-making factory on the brink of closure, and Quayside, a tour around the Newcastle dock area, which was also set for demolition. Amber have been criticised by development agencies and tourist boards for focussing upon declining industries rather than promoting new developments.

Amber moved away from standard documentaries to experiment with form. By the mid-1980s, scholars James Leggott and Tobias Hochscherf argue that Amber's "film work could broadly be divided into three strands: documentary portraits of places, people and work environments; more formally complex works of drama-documentary... and full-length fictional films... which evolved out of earlier documentary and photographic projects".

Channel 4 helped to finance and produce their first feature-length film, Seacoal, a semi-fictional narrative set among the coal-collectors on Lynemouth beach, close to the coal-mining towns of Ellington and Ashington. The BFI's Martin Hunt comments that Seacoal "built upon earlier techniques and experiments to interweave a fictional narrative with documentary footage, and improvised and reconstructed dramatic scenes. The final film was the product of two years' working and living alongside the seacoalers." The film won the European Film Award.

In 1987, Amber produced T. Dan Smith: A Funny Thing Happened on the Way to Utopia ..., an experimental mix of thriller and documentary, focussing upon the ambitious 1960s leader of Newcastle City Council, T. Dan Smith, who was imprisoned for corruption for his involvement in a planning deal.

Amber collaborated with German Democratic Republic directors Barbara and Winfried Junge to produce a two-part film with punning titles: From Marx and Engels to Marks and Spencer, and, for the return trip, From Marks and Spencer to Marx and Engels. Supported by Channel 4, and broadcast in May 1989, the films show the destruction of the welfare state by the Thatcher ministry, alongside life behind the Iron Curtain.

=== 1990s to present ===
Dream On from 1991 was a feature length film produced by the collective starring Anna-Marie Gascoigne and Amber Styles combining realism with fantasy elements to tell the stories of women living in the Meadow Well estate in North East England.

Released in 1994, Eden Valley was a generation-gap saga played out against a horse-racing backdrop, starring Brian Hogg and Darren Bell. In 1994, the collective produced the film essay Letters to Katja, centring on Amber photographer Sirkka-Liisa Konttinen.

The 1997 film The Scar looked at the implications of the 1984 miners' strike, and the disparity between "old" and New Labour. Socialist Tony Benn labelled the film "a drama of enormous importance". Like Father, released in 2001 about identities between grandfather, father and son, was their biggest-budget production at that point: £600,000 including distribution costs.

An exhibition of Amber's photographic work was held at the Laing Art Gallery in Newcastle in summer 2015.

== Collective ==
As a collective, individuals are not credited on their films, instead opting for the credit "Amber Production Team", or variants thereof. At one point there were 18 members of the collective, but this became unworkable. In 2001, according to an article in The Guardian, there were seven. The group decided that everyone would be "paid the same, irrespective of whether they had children." Members have included photographer Sirkka-Liisa Konttinen, whose book Step by Step inspired the film Billy Elliot.

== Bibliography ==
- Brady, Martin (2014). "Marx for Children: Moor and the Ravens of London and Hans Rockle and the Devil". In Mazierska, Ewa; Kristensen, Lars (eds.). Marx at the Movies: Revisiting History, Theory and Practice. Hampshire: Palgrave MacMillan.
- Crouch, David; Grassick, Richard (2005). "Amber Films, documentary and encounters". In Crouch, David; Jackson, Rhona; Thompson, Felix (eds.). The Media and the Tourist Imagination. London: Routledge.
- James, David E. (1996). "For a Working-Class Television". In James, David E; Berg, Rick (eds.). The Hidden Foundation: Cinema and the Question of Class. University of Minnesota Press.
- Konttinen, Sirkka-Liisa (2009). Byker Revisited. Northumbria Press. ISBN 978-1904794424.
- Leggott, James; Hochscherf, Tobias (2008). "From Marks and Spencer to Marx and Engels: a transnational EF and Amber Film documentary project across the Iron Curtain". Studies in Documentary Film. 2 (2). Intellect. doi:10.1386/sdf.2.2.123/1 (inactive 11 July 2025).
- Samuel, Raphael (1998). Island Stories: Unraveling Britain; Theatres of Memory, Volume II. London: Verso. ISBN 1859841902.
- Wayne, Mike (2001). Political Film: The Dialectics of Third Cinema. London: Pluto Press.
- Leggott, James (9 April 2020). In Fading Light: The Films of the Amber Collective. Berghahn Books. ISBN 978-1-78920-651-7 – via Google Books.
