= Lucideon =

Materials company in Stoke-on-Trent, UK

Lucideon Limited
- Abbreviation: Lucideon
- Formation: April 1948
- Legal status: Private company
- Purpose: Materials testing & consultancy, materials development, failure analysis, manufacturing consultancy, resource efficiency, assurance
- Location: Brooms Road, Stone, Staffordshire ST15 0SH
- Region served: Worldwide
- Chief Executive: Tony Kinsella
- Parent organisation: Lucideon Group Limited
- Affiliations: Association of Independent Research and Technology Organisations (AIRTO)
- Employees: Materials scientists, industry experts, manufacturing consultants, engineers (144 staff)
- Website: lucideon.com

Lucideon (formerly Ceram) is an independent materials development, testing and assurance company based in Stoke-on-Trent and in the UK. Lucideon owns testing facilities around the world.

== History ==
The origins of Lucideon can be traced back to several preceding organisations, including the British Refractories Research Association (BRRA), which was founded in 1920. The UK's pottery industry was required by the Import Duties Advisory Committee in 1937 to create a research association, thus the British Pottery Research Association (BPRA) was formed in 1937. In April 1948, both the BRRA and the BPRA combined together as the British Ceramic Research Association (BCRA) to create one organisation that would serve the ceramics industry. A key goal of the association was to support these industries in being both profitable and well-equipped.

Prior to its formation, it had been decided that the BCRA should be based at the BPRA's Queens Road location in Penkhull, Stoke-on-Trent, where a new building was purpose-built to function as both the headquarters and laboratories of the association between 1947 and 1950. In December 1951, this building was officially opened by the Prince Philip, Duke of Edinburgh.

At the BCRA's formation, Dr. A. T. Green was appointed director of research; amongst other projects, Green oversaw the BRSA's work on sintered oxides during the 1950s, which included the acceptance of a government contract to examine new dielectric materials in 1955. Beyond his research role, Green played an influential role in persuading various independent companies across a traditional and fragmented industry to both support and implement the conclusions of the BRCA's investigations. By 1961, the association had undertaken studies in strain in wall tile glazes, the firing of intermittent kilns, thermal shock in furnace structures, extrusion, chrome-magnesite refractories, rheology and ceramic casting-slip control.

By the 1970s, BCRA was using computers, such as the Elliot 900, to assist in its research work. Between the 1970s and the twenty-first century, the association gradually moved away from large and broad-based programmes for whole industry sectors towards more compact and focused initiatives to address particular problems on behalf of specific companies.

In May 1986, the BRCA changed its name to British Ceramic Research Ltd, having been incorporated as a company on 18 November 1985. Thereafter, the company was privatised and acquired by Beechfields (Stoke) Limited. Starting in the late 1990s, the company traded under the abbreviated name Ceram. On 1 February 2014, the company rebranded itself as Lucideon Limited. By 2019, the company employed 240 scientists.

== Structure ==
Lucideon is situated south of the University Hospital of North Staffordshire.

Lucideon incorporates:

- UK Headquarters - (formerly CERAM Research Ltd)
- Assurance Services - Lucideon CICS Limited
- US Laboratories - (formerly M+P Labs) based in Schenectady, New York, Greenville, South Carolina and offices in Raleigh, North Carolina

Lucideon's laboratories and techniques are accredited by the United Kingdom Accreditation Service (UKAS).

== Function and activities ==
Lucideon provides materials development, technologies, consultancy and testing and analysis to a diverse range of industries including: healthcare, construction, ceramics, aerospace, nuclear and power generation. It has also partners with other organisations to examine matters such as nuclear waste management, and conformal armour.

In 2019, Lucideon was reportedly engaged in research into producing sodium-based batteries as a replacement for lithium and the potential for using ceramics in pain management medication.

The company has also been involved in the aerospace sector, such as in the studies of new techniques of implementing heat management for engines, and supplied the ceramic tiles used on NASA's Perseverance Mars rover.

In 2026, Lucideon announced its proposal for the construction of a British-based ceramic matrix composite manufacturing capability, which it claimed to be costed at £500 million.
