= Martin Kollár =

Slovak photographer

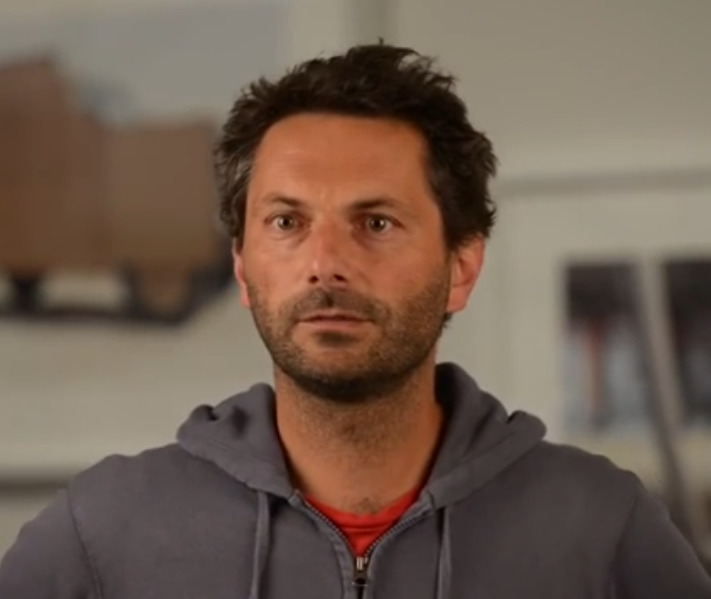
- In a Brooklyn Museum video in 2016
- Born: 23 November 1971 (age 54); Žilina, Czechoslovakia
- Education: Academy of Performing Arts in Bratislava
- Occupations: Photographer, cinematographer

Martin Kollár (born 23 November 1971) is a Slovak photographer and cinematographer. He was awarded the Leica Oskar Barnack Award in 2014. Kollár has had solo exhibitions at the Maison européenne de la photographie, Paris; Le Château d'eau, Toulouse; Reiss Engelhorn Museum, Mannheim; Slovak National Gallery, Bratislava; Benaki Museum, Athens; and Musée de l'Élysée, Lausanne.

== Early life and education ==
Kollár was born in Žilina. He studied cinematography in the Film and Television faculty of the Academy of Performing Arts in Bratislava.

== Career ==
In 2003 he joined Agence VU, (which he appears to have left in late 2013 (Note: Kollár appears in VU's list of photographers as archived by the Wayback Machine on 11 August 2013; he is absent from it as archived on 21 December 2013. (His profile and photograph selection as of 11 August 2013 are archived here.))). He worked on documentary and fiction films, including Autoportrait (director), Ball (producer) and as a cameraman for Velvet Terrorists, Cooking History, Across the Border: Five Views from Neighbours, 66 Seasons, Ladomirova Morytates and Legends, and the animated film In the Box.

His numerous photographs of everyday life in Slovakia are published in newspapers and magazines worldwide, such as Le Monde 2, Libération, GEO and Courrier International.

Slovakia 001, a survey of Slovakia in colour photographs, was prompted by a contest held by the Slovak Institute for Public Affairs. Kollár avoided looking for the exceptional and instead concentrated on oddities seen in everyday life. The photographs were exhibited and also published as a book.

Television Anchors is a series showing television news reporters in incongruous situations. It was prompted by the sudden cancellation of an assignment to photograph New Orleans after Hurricane Katrina: although Canal Street had escaped most of the damage, it was the standard television backdrop thanks to its ease of access. Allowing more into the frame around the reporter than normally permitted by a television news broadcast presents a very different picture.

In the series Nothing Special, begun around 2000, Kollár explored the environment of countries that had been in the Warsaw bloc. He traveled nearly 13,500 km, "looking for moments that portrayed the chaotic and often humorous moments"; examining "clashing cultures, tradition versus modernity, and sometimes situations that are simply perplexing". The photographs were all unstaged.

In order to participate in the project This Place, launched by Frédéric Brenner, Kollár was expected to spend six months photographing in Israel. He based himself in Tel Aviv, and visited many sites made available thanks to much preparation and persuasion by his assistant, Talia Rosin. He concentrated on Israel's future rather than its past or even present, and thus on sites of preparation or prevention. security- and surveillance-related sites and activities in Israel. The book has no captions, and the photographs go unexplained. "Every image in this Slovakian photographer's depiction of Israel is a photograph of unintelligible secrets," commented Alec Soth. "At the end of [Field Trip] I'm more confused than I was at the beginning, making the book a wonderful example of photography's inability to be able to explain very much at all", wrote Mark Power. A New York Times review of an exhibition of This Place praised Kollár's "color pictures that hop from subject to subject but are on edge or surreal", saying that there was no need for captions as the images "engross and unsettle on their own". It was named one of LensCulture's favorite books of 2013.

For the 15th in its series of European Eyes on Japan: Japan Today, in which photographers cover Japan prefecture by prefecture, the EU–Japan Fest Japan Committee invited Kollár and Olivier Metzger to photograph Chiba. Kollár stayed in Japan for a month in spring 2013. The resulting work was exhibited in Arles as part of Marseille-Provence 2013 and published in book form.

Sean O'Hagan writes that "It is [a] state of impermanence that Martin Kollar sets out to explore in his latest book, Provisional Arrangement, which attempts to map out a psychogeography of uncertainty and stasis. (Note: O'Hagan's article accompanies a page of photographs: "Road to nowhere: Martin Kollár's deadpan travel diary – in pictures", The Guardian, 26 September 2016.) Brad Feuerhelm calls the book, with its "cinematically constructed images", "a work of soft genius".

== Awards ==
- Les Pépinières européennes pour jeunes artistes (stipend), Luxembourg, June–September 1999.
- Annual Country Report, year's stipend awarded by the Institute for Public Affairs, 2001.
- FujiFilm Euro Press Photo Awards, national level: 1st prize, 2001.
- Leica Oskar Barnack Award, 2014.
- Prix Élysée, Photo Élysée, 2016
- Backlight Photography Ward (Finland)

== Exhibitions ==
=== Solo exhibitions ===
- Martin Kollár: Europe, Galéria Profil, Bratislava, October 2000.
- Slovakia 2001: A Pictorial Report on the State of the Country, Johann Pálffy Palace, Bratislava, 2001.
- 2001: Správa o stave krajiny, Dom Fotografie, Poprad, February 2002.
- Martin Kollar: Raport o stanie kraju 001, Mała Galeria ZPAF-CSW, Warsaw, November 2002. An exhibition of Slovakia 001.
- Nothing Special, Freelens Galerie, Hamburg, August–October 2005.
- Nothing Special, Batagianni Gallery, Athens, 13th International Month of Photography, October 2006.
- TV Anchors, Maison européenne de la photographie, Paris, 2007
- Nothing Special, Le Château d'eau, Toulouse, June–September 2008
- Tranzit, Tranzit Gallery, Bratislava, November 2012 –
- Field Trip, Espace Images, Vevey, March–April 2014.
- Field Trip, Zephyr – Raum für Fotografie, Reiss Engelhorn Museum, Mannheim, March–June 2015.
- Field Trip, Robert Capa Contemporary Photography Center, Budapest, September–October 2015.
- Martin Kollar: Field Trip / Exkurzia. Slovak National Gallery, Bratislava, October 2015 – January 2016.
- Field Trip, Athens Photo Festival 2016, Benaki Museum, June–July 2016.
- Provisional Arrangement, Musée de l'Élysée, Lausanne, September–December 2016.

=== Other exhibitions ===
- Report from the Country, Centre for Contemporary Art, Ujazdów Castle, Warsaw, 2002
- Ihmisiä itärajoilla = People in the Eastern Border Country, Imatra Art Museum, Imatra (Imatran valokuvataiteen biennaali 2003, the first Imatra Biennale of Photographic Art), June–August 2003. Together with András Fekete, Dagmar Hochová, Boris Missirkov, Georgi Bogdanov, Jaakko Heikkilä, Kati Koivikko, Lucia Nimcová, Marja Pirilä, Pekka Turunen, Sanni Seppo, Veli Granö; Krisztina Erdei; Dana Kyndrová; Jindřich Štreit.
- Slovak Photography 1925–2000, Městská Knihovna (municipal library), Prague, March 2003.
- Parallele Avantgarden – Gibt es eine "europäische Fotografie"? Artspace, Vienna, April–May 2003. With Irena Blühová, Ladislav Foltyn, Tomaž Gregorič, Karlo Kocjančič, Marek Kvetán, Alex Mlynárčik, OHO, Tobias Putrih, Shirana Shahbazi, Janko Skerlep.
- Stadt in Sicht. New Art from Bratislava, Vienna Künstlerhaus, Vienna, May–July 2003. With 19 other artists.
- Check Slovakia!, Neuer Berliner Kunstverein, Berlin, May–June 2004. With Erik Binder, Cyril Blažo, Tomáš Agat Błoński, Pavlína Fichta Čierna, Bohdan Hostiňák, Ilona Németh, Milan Tittel, and Emőke Vargová.
- Exhibition of finalists for the Oskár Čepan prize. Mirbach Palace gallery, Bratislava, May–August 2004. With Mário Chromý, Svätopluk Mikyta and Boris Sirka.
- Fotografie aus Tschechien und Osteuropa, Palais für Aktuelle Kunst/Kunstverein Glückstadt, Glückstadt, August–September 2004. With Jindřich Štreit.
- Slowakei durch die Linse von Dokumentarfotografen, Fluss, Wolkersdorf, October–November 2004. With Andrej Bán, Pavol Breier, Alan Hyža, Martin Marenčin, Lucia Nimcová, Jozef Ondzik, Jaro Sýkora.
- Bitte lächeln, Aufnahme!, Martin-Gropius-Bau, Berlin, December 2004 – February 2005. Together with Mart Viljus, Andrejs Grants, Rimaldas Vikšraitis, Agostino Baldacchino, Maciej Skawiński, Kollár, Borut Peterlin, František Dostál, Imre Benkő, Ioannis Yerou.
- Leica Oskar Barnack Preis 2004, Leica Galerie Solms, Solms, January 2005. With Peter Granser and Alex Majoli.
- Leica Oskar Barnack Award 2004, Leica Ginza Salon, Ginza, Tokyo, September–October 2005. With Peter Granser and Alex Majoli.
- Un/Mill à 2.8: Rip Hopkins, Martin Kollar et Tiane Doan Na Champassak, Maison européenne de la photographie, Paris, November 2006. Work by Kollár, Rip Hopkins, and Tiane Doan Na Champassak.
- Slovakia: Through the lens of documentary photographers, Photography Gallery Prospekto, Vilnius. December 2006 – January 2007. With Andrej Bán, Pavol Breier, Alan Hyža, Martin Marenčin, Jozef Ondzik, Jaro Sýkora.
- Unseen: An exhibition of International Photography, Museum of Contemporary Art Shanghai, 2008. Together with Ashley Gilbertson, Camille Vivier, Charles Fréger, Jacob Aue Sobol, Julia Fullerton-Batten, Mikhael Subotzky, Rafał Milach, Lieko Shiga and Simon Roberts.
- Prague Biennale, Prague, 2009
- Backlight 08 – Tickle attack, Centre d'Art 'Nei Liicht', Dudelange, June–July 2009. With Bettina Flitner, Anne Guest, Marco Lanza & Saverio Lanza, Paula Muhr, Matt Siber, Mai Yamashita & Naoto Kobayashi.
- European Eyes on Japan / Japan Today vol. 15, Marseille-Provence 2013, Voies Off Gallery, Arles, September–October 2013. Photographs by Kollár and Olivier Metzger of Chiba prefecture.
- Prix Elysée 2014, Musée de l'Elysée, Lausanne, January–May 2015. Photographs by Kollár and Anoush Abrar, Mari Bastashevski, Philippe Chancel, Annabel Elgar, Agnès Geoffray, Marco Poloni, Kourtney Roy.
- This Place, DOX Centre for Contemporary Art, Prague, October 2014 – March 2015.
- This Place, Tel Aviv Museum of Art, May–September 2015.
- From Room to Roam. Albumarte, Rome (Fotografia – International Festival of Rome). October–December 2015. Photographs of Ukraine, with Lucia Nimcová.
- This Place, Norton Museum of Art, Palm Beach, Florida, October 2015 – January 2016.
- This Place, Brooklyn Museum, February–June 2016.

== Film credits ==
- Hey, You Slovaks, 2003 (cinematographer)
- Autoportrait = Autoportét – Martin Kollár, 2012 (writer, director and cinematographer) (Note: A ten-minute version is available here at Vimeo.)
- Ball (producer)
- Velvet Terrorists = Zamatoví teroristi, 2013 (cinematographer)
- Cooking History = Ako sa varia dejiny, 2009 (cinematographer)
- Across the Border: Five Views from Neighbours (cinematographer)
- 66 Seasons = 66 sezón, 2003 (cinematographer)
- Ladomirova Morytates and Legends = Ladomirovské morytáty a legendy, 1998 (cinematographer)
- In the Box (cinematographer)
- Goat = Koza, 2015 (cinematographer)
- 5 October = 5. október, 2016 (writer, director, cinematographer)
- Wishing on a Star, 2024 (cinematographer)

== Publications ==
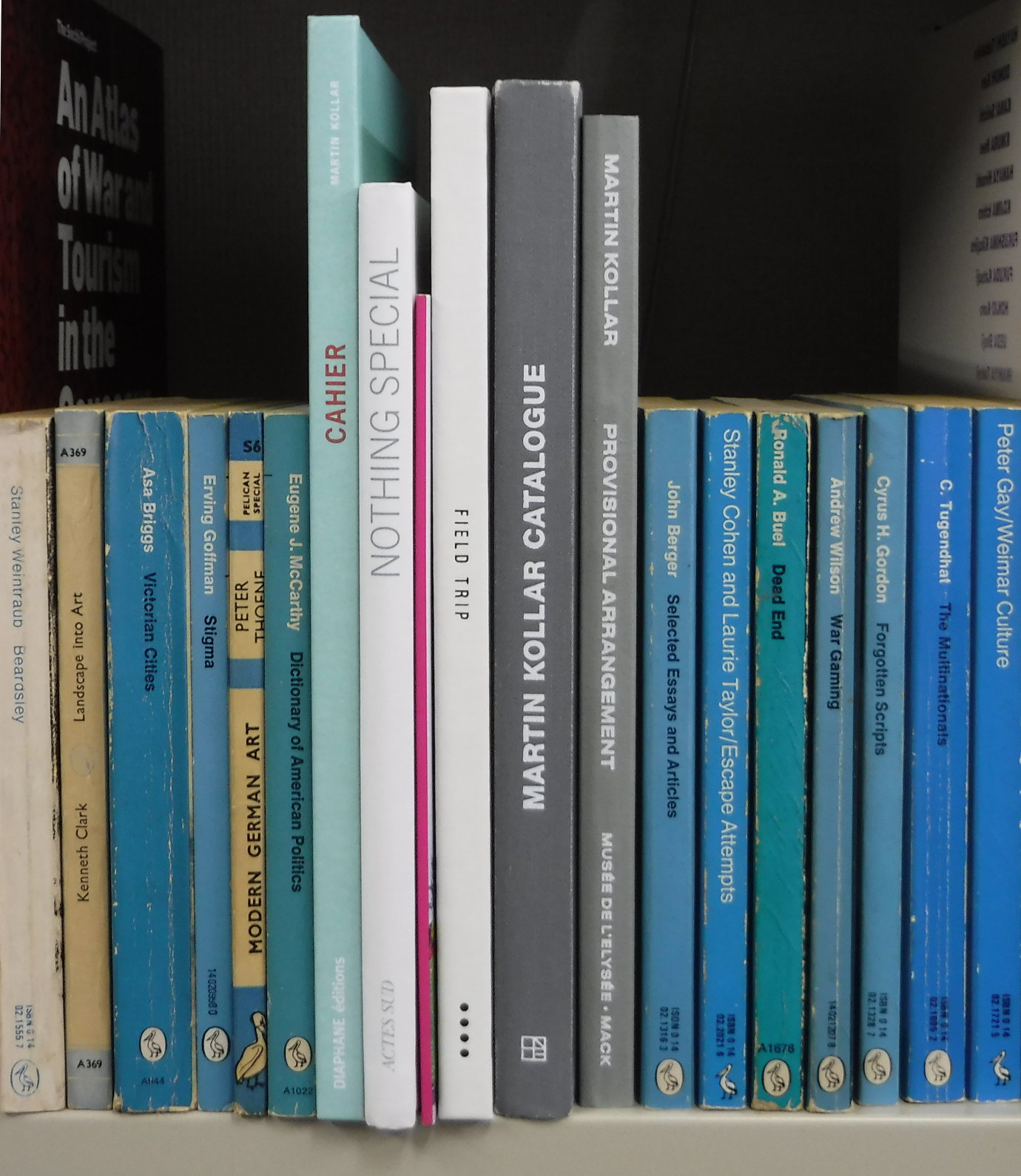
Some books by Kollár

=== Books by Kollár ===
- Slovensko 001: Obrazová správa o stave krajiny = Slovakia 001: A Pictorial Report on the State of the Country. Bratislava: Institute for Public Affairs, 2001. ISBN 978-80-88935-25-4. With text in Slovak and English.
- Nothing Special. Colour photographs of Europe (mostly Slovakia and the Czech Republic) from 2001 to 2004, each captioned with the place and year; text by Katarína Kerekešová and Peter Kerekes.
  - Nothing special: Photographies de Martin Kollar. Arles: Actes Sud, 2007. ISBN 978-2-7427-6742-7. (Note: Actes Sud's page about Nothing Special.)
  - Nothing special: Fotografien von Martin Kollar. Heidelberg: Braus, 2008. ISBN 978-3-89904-276-4. Text in German.
- Cahier. Montreuil-sur-Brèche: Diaphane, 2011. Collection of uncaptioned colour photographs of Clermont-Ferrand, made during a residence in July and August 2011. ISBN 978-2-919077-03-8. (Note: Diaphane's page about Cahier.)
- Field Trip. London: Mack, 2013. ISBN 978-1-907946-48-6. Collection of uncaptioned colour photographs of Israel, made as part of This Place, with a short afterword by Kollár in English. (Note: Mack's page about Field Trip.)
- Martin Kollar: Catalogue. Bratislava: Slovak National Gallery, 2015. ISBN 978-80-8059-189-2. With text in Slovak and English by Aurel Hrabušický. (Note: SNG's page about Catalogue.)
- Provisional Arrangement. London: Mack, 2016. ISBN 978-1-910164-50-1. Colour photographs, without captions. Texts in English by Lydia Dorner, Tatyana Franck and Pascal Hufschmid, and Michel Parmigiani. (Note: Mack's page about Provisional Arrangement.) "This book is published in the context of the Prix Elysée".
- After. London: Mack, 2021. ISBN 978-1-913620-34-9. (Note: Mack's page about After.)

=== Books with contributions by Kollár ===
- Päivi Eronen, ed. Ihmisiä itärajoilla = People in the Eastern Border Country. Imatra: Imatran kaupunki, 2003. ISBN 978-951-977222-6. Photographs by András Fekete, Dagmar Hochová, Boris Missirkov, Georgi Bogdanov, Jaakko Heikkilä, Kati Koivikko, Kollár, Lucia Nimcová, Marja Pirilä, Pekka Turunen, Sanni Seppo, Veli Granö; Krisztina Erdei; Dana Kyndrová; Jindřich Štreit. Accompanying the exhibitions at Imatran valokuvataiteen biennaali 2003 = Imatra Biennale of Photographic Art 2003, June–August 2003; Suomalaista valokuvataidetta = Contemporary Photography in Finland, Dom fotografie Poprad, Slovakia, October–December 2003.
- À l'Est de l'Ouest = East of the West. 16°24′: Europe de l'Est 2005. Paris: Unistrat Coface, 2005. OCLC 470037284. Photographs by Kollár, text (in French and English) by Guy-Pierre Chomette.
- Mart Viljus and Borut Peterlin. Bitte lächeln, Aufnahme!: Fotokunst aus den zehn neuen EU-Ländern. Heidelberg: Braus im Wachter, 2005. ISBN 978-3-89904-148-4. Accompanying an exhibition at Martin-Gropius-Bau Berlin, 2004–2005; with photographs by Mart Viljus, Andrejs Grants, Rimaldas Vikšraitis, Agostino Baldacchino, Maciej Skawiński, Kollár, Borut Peterlin, František Dostál, Imre Benkő, Ioannis Yerou.
- Magali Jauffret. Vu' à Paris. Saint-Laurent-du-Var: Panini, 2006. ISBN 978-2-84538-712-6. Photographs by Christer Strömholm, Michael Ackerman, Aniu, Philip Blenkinsop, Bruno Boudjelal, Denis Darzacq, Pierre-Olivier Deschamps, Bertrand Desprez, Claudine Doury, Richard Dumas, JH Engström, Gilles Favier, Stanley Greene, Rip Hopkins, Martin Kollár, Anders Petersen, Ian Teh, Lars Tunbjörk, Guillaume Zuili; text in French and English.
- Y'a de la joie. [Paris]: Union Financière de France, 2009. Four booklets, one by each of four photographers (Kollár, Claudine Doury, Denis Darzacq and Bertrand Desprez) in a slipcase. Kollár's booklet is of photographs he took along the French coast in 2009.
- Sylt: Im Spiegel zeitgenössischer Fotografie. Ostfildern bei Stuttgart: Hatje Cantz, 2012. ISBN 978-3-7757-3364-9. Photographs of Sylt by Julia Baier, Peter Bialobrzeski, Jörg Brüggemann, Denis Brudna, Tine Casper, Christian Diehl, Christoph Engel, Hans Hansen, Volker Hinz, Britta Isenrath, Martin Kollár, Ingar Krauss, Martin Liebscher, Robert Lebeck, Julia Maria Max, Dita Pepe, Christian Popkes, Martin Pudenz, Anja Schaffner, Evzen Sobek, Grit Schwerdtfeger, Susanne Schleyer/Michael J. Stephan, Thomas Wrede; text in German.
- Anna Shpakova and Andreǐ Zuev. The Russian Moment: 20 Leading World Photographers' Expedition to Russia, July 2013. Moscow: RIA Novosti, 2013. ISBN 978-5-90583049-5. Kollár contributes a section, "Stuntmen".
- 日本に向けられたヨーロッパ人の眼 ジャパン トゥディ = European Eyes on Japan: Japan Today. Vol. 15, Martin Kollar, Olivier Metzger. Tokyo: EU–Japan Fest Japan Committee, 2013. Photographs by Kollár and Olivier Metzger of Chiba prefecture; text (in Japanese and English) by Mayumi Asakura. OCLC 941208655
- Sam Stourdzé and Pascal Hufschmid, Prix Elysée 2014: Livre des nominés = Nominees' Book. Lausanne: Musée de l'Elysée, 2014. ISBN 978-2-88350-106-5. With photographs by Anoush Abrar, Mari Bastashevski, Philippe Chancel, Annabel Elgar, Agnès Geoffray, Kollár, Marco Poloni, Kourtney Roy.
- Charlotte Cotton, ed. This Place. London: Mack, 2014. ISBN 978-1-910164-13-6. Photographs of Israel and the West Bank by Frédéric Brenner, Wendy Ewald, Kollár, Josef Koudelka, Jungjin Lee, Gilles Peress, Fazal Sheikh, Stephen Shore, Rosalind Fox Solomon, Thomas Struth, Jeff Wall and Nick Waplington.
