= Shane Lavalette =

American photographer (born 1987)

- Born: 1987 (age 38–39); Burlington, Vermont, US
- Occupations: Photographer, artist, publisher
- Website: www.shanelavalette.com

Shane Lavalette (born 1987) is an American photographer.

== Life and work ==
Lavalette was born in Burlington, Vermont. He studied photography at Tufts University and the School of the Museum of Fine Arts, Boston, where he received a BFA in 2009.

In 2010, he was commissioned by the High Museum of Art in Atlanta to contribute to their Picturing the South series, His work was exhibited there in 2012 and received media coverage from CNN, Time, NPR, and The New York Times. His book One Sun, One Shadow is an extension of this body of work.

In 2011, Lavalette was hired as the associate director of Light Work, a non-profit photography organization in Syracuse, New York. He was appointed director two years later, in 2013. At Light Work, Lavalette oversaw the organization's Artist-in-Residence Program, exhibitions, and publication of Contact Sheet, a photography journal. Lavelette left Light Work in February 2021.

In 2017, Lavalette was commissioned by Fotostiftung Schwiz to follow the footsteps of the Swiss photographer Theo Frey to investigate the same villages Frey documented in 1939 for the Swiss National Exhibition (Schweizerische Landesausstellung); Carona, Gais, Ruderswill, Saignelegier, Saint-Saphorin, Sainte-Croix, Schwyz, Stammheim, Vicosoprano, Visperterminen, Wil and Zuoz that resulted in the book Still (Noon), published by Patrick Frey in 2018.

== Publications ==
=== Publications by Lavalette ===
- One Sun, One Shadow. Self-published, 2016. With a text by Tim Davis. Edition of 1500 copies. ISBN 978-0-9842973-4-4.
- Still (Noon). Patrick Frey, 2018. Edition of 1000 copies. ISBN 978-3-906803-65-4.

=== Publications with contribution by Lavalette ===
- reGeneration2: Tomorrow's Photographers Today. London: Thames & Hudson, 2010. ISBN 9780500288894.
- Photographs Not Taken: A Collection of Photographers' Essays. Chapel Hill, NC: Daylight, 2012. By Will Steacy. Second revised edition. ISBN 978-0-983231-61-5. With an introduction by Lyle Rexer.
- Unfamiliar Familiarities—Outside Views on Switzerland. Zürich: Lars Müller, 2017. Edited by Peter Pfrunder, Lars Willumeit, and Tatyana Franck. ISBN 978-3-03778-510-2. A six-volume set: one volume by Lavalette and the others by Alinka Echeverría, Eva Leitolf, Simon Roberts, and Zhang Xiao, plus a text volume in English, German, and French. Published to accompany an exhibition at Fotostiftung Schweiz, Winterthur, Switzerland and Musée de l'Élysée, Lausanne, Switzerland.
- LOST II (LOST, Syracuse). New York: Kris Graves Projects, 2019. Includes a poem by Carrie Mae Weems and a text by Arthur Flowers.

== Awards ==
- Yousuf Karsh Prize in Photography, Museum of Fine Arts, Boston, 2009
- Focus Award: Rising Star, Griffin Museum of Photography, 2013
- Pollock-Krasner Foundation Grant, 2019
