= Will Steacy =

Will Steacy (born 1980) is an American writer and photographer based in New York City. His work is held in the collection of the Museum of Contemporary Photography, Chicago.

== Life and work ==
Steacy "descended from five generations of newspaper men. His great-great-great-grandfather started the Evening Dispatch in York, Pa., in 1876 and his father was an editor for The Philadelphia Inquirer." He received his BFA from the Tisch School of the Arts, at New York University in 2003. Before becoming a professional photographer, he worked as a union laborer.

Sean O'Hagan in The Observer described Steacy's Down these Mean Streets (2012) as "a merging of his own photographs with newspaper clippings, journal entries and various found material pertaining to the long death of the American dream, from Reaganomics in the 1980s to the current economic recession."

In 2011 he photographed paper money, "removed from circulation but not yet destroyed, and photographed them with a large-format film camera".

For five years from 2009, Steacy documented the struggle and decline of The Philadelphia Inquirer newspaper, published as a book, Deadline (2016), and as a tribute newspaper.

== Publications ==
=== Publications by Steacy ===
- Photographs Not Taken: A Collection of Photographers' Essays. Chapel Hill, NC: Daylight, 2012. Second revised edition. ISBN 978-0-983231-61-5. With an introduction by Lyle Rexer and essays by Dave Anderson, Timothy Archibald, Roger Ballen, Thomas Bangsted, Juliana Beasley, Nina Berman, Elinor Carucci, Kelli Connell, Paul D'Amato, Tim Davis, KayLynn Deveney, Doug DuBois, Rian Dundon, Amy Elkins, Jim Goldberg, Emmet Gowin, Gregory Halpern, Tim Hetherington, Todd Hido, Rob Hornstra, Eirik Johnson, Chris Jordan, Nadav Kander, Ed Kashi, Misty Keasler, Lisa Kereszi, Erika Larsen, Shane Lavalette, Deana Lawson, Joshua Lutz, David Maisel, Mary Ellen Mark, Laura McPhee, Michael Meads, Andrew Moore, Richard Mosse, Zwelethu Mthethwa, Laurel Nakadate, Ed Panar, Christian Patterson, Andrew Phelps, Sylvia Plachy, Mark Power, Peter Riesett, Simon Roberts, Joseph Rodriguez, Stefan Ruiz, Matt Salacuse, Alessandra Sanguinetti, Aaron Schuman, Jamel Shabazz, Alec Soth, Amy Stein, Mark Steinmetz, Joni Sternbach, Hank Willis Thomas, Brian Ulrich, Peter van Agtmael, Massimo Vitali, Hiroshi Watanabe, Alex Webb, and Rebecca Norris Webb.
- Down These Mean Streets. Zürich: B.frank, 2012. Photographs by Steacy with newspaper clippings, journal entries and various found material. ISBN 978-3936300802. Edition of 400 copies.
- Deadline. Vol. 1. Zürich: B.frank, 2015. Photographs by Steacy and essays by various journalists. ISBN 978-3-906217-06-2. Newspaper format.
- Deadline. Vol. 2. Zürich: B.frank, 2016. Photographs by Steacy and essays by various journalists. ISBN 9783906217079.

=== Publications with contributions by Steacy ===
- The Photographer’s Playbook: 307 Assignments and Ideas. New York: Aperture, 2014. ISBN 978-1-59711-247-5. Edited by Gregory Halpern and Jason Fulford.

== Exhibitions ==
- Down These Mean Streets, part of Looking for America – Diffusion, Cardiff International Festival of Photography, 2015, Ffotogallery, Cardiff, Wales

== Awards ==
- 2011: Photo District News 30 Emerging Photographers to Watch
- 2015: Special Jurors’ Mention, PhotoBook of the Year, Paris Photo–Aperture Foundation PhotoBook Awards, for Deadline.

== Collections ==
Steacy's work is held in the following permanent collection:

- Museum of Contemporary Photography, Chicago: 2 works (as of September 2020)
