= Prune Nourry =

French multidisciplinary artist (born 1985)

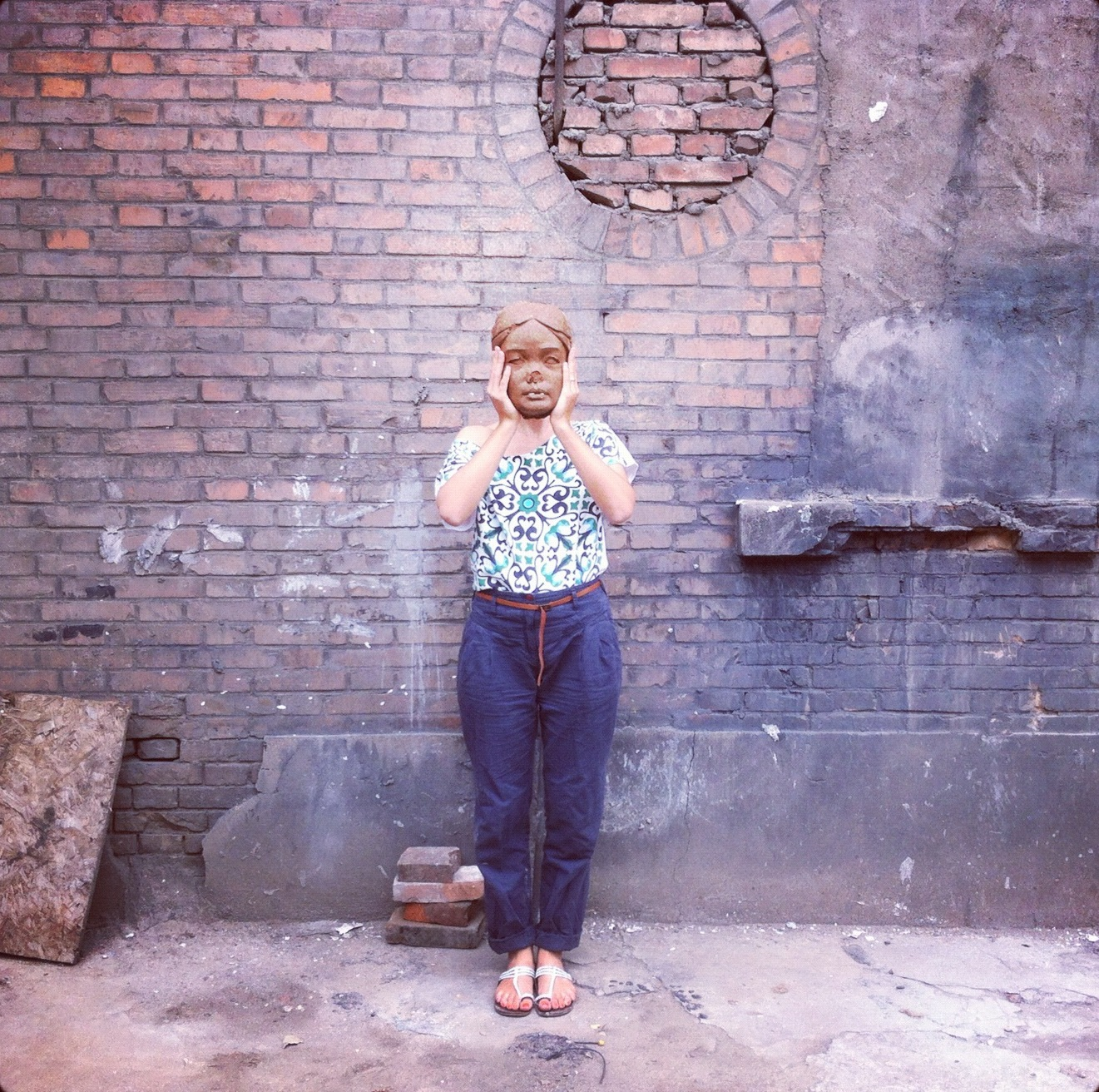
- Nourry in 2013
- Born: 30 January 1985 (age 41); Paris, France
- Known for: sculpture, photography, video
- Website: http://www.prunenourry.com/

Prune Nourry is a French multidisciplinary artist currently working at the Invisible Dog Art Center in Brooklyn, NY.

Specialized in sculpture, she also explores a multitude of media notably through installations that include photography, film and performance.

Prune works on topics ranging from bioethics to women's rights and gender. She brings attention to some of the preoccupying issues that arise from fast-growing scientific discoveries such as sex selection, artificial procreation, and genetic engineering.

== Biography ==
Nourry was born in Paris, France in 1985. She received a degree in wood sculpture from the École Boulle in Paris, and began her career as independent multidisciplinary artist at the end of her final year at the school. She has been an artist-in-residence at the Invisible Dog Art Center in Brooklyn, NY since 2011.

She is married to the artist JR.

In 2016, at age 31, she was diagnosed with breast cancer, and by 2019 had undergone a mastectomy. She made a non-fiction film about these experiences called Serendipity. As of 2018, she was in remission.

== Selected exhibitions and performances ==
Year	Exhibit or performance
2017	Contemporary Archeology, Solo Show, Galerie Daniel Templon, Brussels, Belgium, January 12 - March 4, 2017
2016	Anima, Collective Show at the Invisible Dog Art Center, Brooklyn, NY, March 3 - April 15, 2016
2015	Terracotta Daughters, The Earth Ceremony, burial of the Terracotta Daughters' army, mainland China, October 17, 2015 Terracotta Daughters & Imbalance, Asia Now, Paris Asian Art Fair, Espace Pierre Cardin, Paris, France, October 20–22, 2015 Terracotta Daughters, Solo Show, Simon Studer Art, Geneva, Switzerland, November 4 - December 18, 2015
2014	Terracotta Daughters, Solo Show, curated by Tatyana Franck, Museo Diego Rivera Anahuacalli, Mexico City, November 2014 Terracotta Daughters, Solo Show in collaboration with the French Institute Alliance Francaise (FIAF) for Crossing The Line Festival, with the support of No Longer Empty, China Institute, New York, September 2014 Site-specific installation Imbalance, Rio Grande 179A Grand st. Chinatown, NYC, Sept 13 - Oct 4 2014 Terracotta Daughters, Solo Show, curated by Tatyana Franck, Flux Laboratory, Zurich, Switzerland, June 2014 The Archeological Dinner, Performance in collaboration with Michelin Star Chef Jean Francois Piege, Le Centquatre, Paris, France - May 26 and 27 Girls, Collective Show curated by Pharrell Williams at Galerie Perrotin, Paris, France, May 2014 La Part Animale, Collective Show curated by Tatyana Franck at Galerie Sophie Scheidecker, Paris, France, May 2014 Terracotta Daughters, Avec Motifs Apparents, Collective Show curated by José Manuel Gonçalvè at Le CentQuatre, Paris, France, March 2014 Terracotta Daughters, Solo Show, Magda Danysz Gallery, Paris, France, March 2014
2013	Terracotta Daughters, Solo show, Magda Danysz Gallery, Shanghai, China Genesis, Solo Show, Casino Venier, Venice, Italy At Home, Group Show, Contemporary Art Center, Malaga, Spain Holy Daughters, Solo Show curated by Tatyana Franck at Flux Laboratory, Geneva, Switzerland Holy Daughters, Solo Show at Galerie Henrik Springmann, Berlin, Germany
2012	Nominated for Go Brooklyn, a community-curated project by the Brooklyn Museum, New York, USA Holy Daughters, Solo Show curated by Tatyana Franck at the Invisible Dog Art Center, New York, USA
2011	Holy River, Performance in collaboration with Calcutta Arts Club, Kolkata, India Spermbar, Installation and Performance on 5th Ave, commissioned by the French Institute Alliance Française (FIAF) for Crossing the Line Festival, New York, USA Holy Daughters, Video projection, Centre Pompidou, Paris, France Holy Daughters, Group Show, Polka Gallery, Paris, France Holy Daughters, Art Paris Art Fair at Grand Palais, Polka Gallery, Paris, France Holy Daughters, Solo show, curated by Tatyana Franck, Paris, France
2010	Holy Daughters, Performance, New Delhi, India
2009	Le Dîner Procréatif, Performance and Solo Show, l’Espace « R », Geneva, Switzerland Le Dîner Procréatif, Performance, the Laboratory Studio, Paris, France Gimme More, Group show, Elaine Levy Gallery, Brussels, Belgium
2008	Les Bébés Domestiques, Group show, KJBi Art Space, Brussels, Belgium Les Bébés Domestiques, Performance, Tokyo, Japan Les Bébés Domestiques, Art Brussels art fair, Elaine Levy Gallery, Brussels, Belgium. Publication of a book in limited edition Adoption Day #2, Performance in collaboration with Elaine Levy Gallery, Brussels, Belgium
2007	Les Bébés Domestiques, Installation, Max Lang Gallery, New York, USA Adoption Day #1, Performance, in collaboration with Jaguar Shoes Gallery, London, England Group show, Biennal of Issy, Carte à Jouer Museum, Issy-les Moulineaux, France L’Animalerie, site-specific installation, reconstitution of animal house, Quai de la Mégisserie, Paris, France
2006	Aux Arts Citoyens, Group Show, Espace des Blancs Manteaux, Paris, France
2004	Toit et Moi, two-person exhibition with the artist JR, La Loge Gallery, Paris, France

== Conferences and lectures ==
Year	
2016	Mapping Memory, Keynote Address, CUNY University The Graduate Center, New York City - March 11 Preparing Tomorrow Today – designing a museum for the future, Conference hosted at Aurora Museum with Tatyana Franck (Director of the Musée de l'Elysée in Lausanne), Shanghai - China – March 20
2014	Visiting Artist Lecture, Suny New Platz, New York City - Nov 12th Art et Société: L’Imaginaire Peut-il Influer sur la Réalité?, Conference hosted at Le Centquatre with Sophie Makariou (Directeur of Musée Guimet), Christophe Guilmoto (Sociologist) and Magda Danysz (Galerist), Paris - May 25 French Institute, New York : Discussion with Chien Chung (Didi) Pei, chair of the Board of Trustees of China Institute
2010	Conference Holy Daughters, with the sociologist Ravinder Kaur, moderated by Alka Pande, art adviser and curator. India Habitat Center, New Delhi. The Emergence of Contemporary Indian Art, Musée du Quai Branly, Paris. Moderated by Christine Ithurbide, a researcher in contemporary art.
2009	Interview, Moderated by Malvika Maheshwari, Professor. Auditorium of the Louvre, Paris. Moderated by Sonia Brunel, speaker of National Museums.
2008	How we draw the borderline between humans and animals: Challenging art experiments with hybrid pet babies, University of Tokyo. Moderated by Noriko Nijiima, sociologist.
2007	Interview, Sciences Po, Paris. Moderated by Gerard Rodach, Professor.

== Videos ==
- Terracotta Daughters, Trailer
- Imbalance, Chinatown
- Holy River, Procession
- Holy Holi
- Holy Daughters, Exhibition View
- The Procreative Dinner
