= Zhang Xiao (photographer) =

Chinese photographer

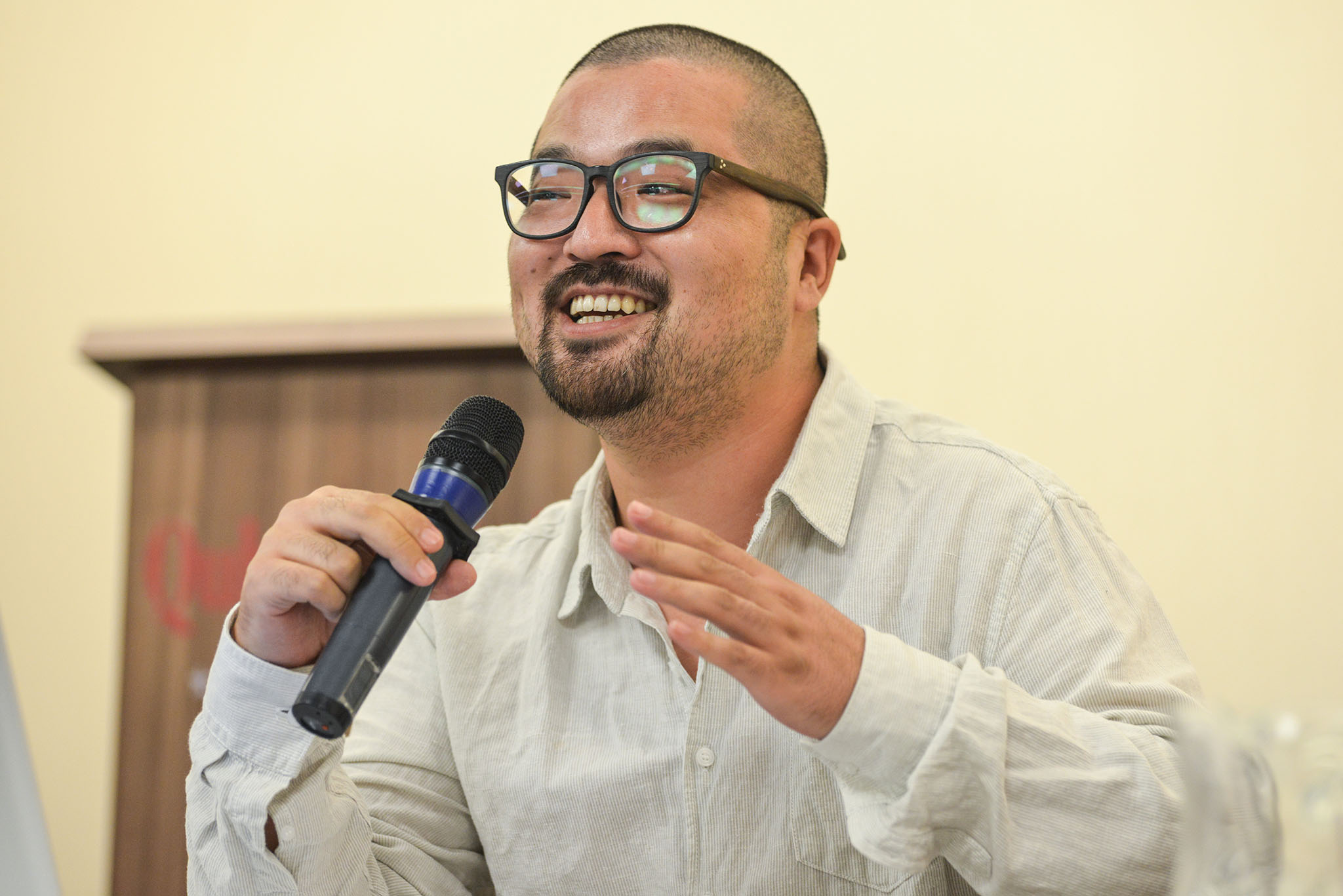
Zhang during FotoArtFestival 2013

Zhang Xiao (simplified Chinese: 张晓; traditional Chinese: 張曉, born 23 November 1981, in Yantai) is a Chinese photographer who has published several series of photographs of China in flux.

== Life and career ==
Zhang graduated in architecture from Yantai University in 2005. From 2006 to 2009, he worked in Chongqing as a photographer for the Chongqing Morning Post (《重庆晨报》). From the start, he carried two cameras: one for work, and a cheap medium format camera for personal use.

Zhang has been inspired by the photography of Diane Arbus, Alec Soth and Boris Mikhailov.

=== They ===
They is a series of photographs mostly taken while Zhang was working in Chongqing; they are of scenes in Chongqing itself but also from nearby on the Yangtze and Jialing rivers and elsewhere. The colour photographs are square format, and employed a Holga camera. A book of the photographs was published in China in 2012; two years later a smaller selection was published in Paris.

=== Coastline ===
For Coastline, Zhang "visited every town and city along the Chinese coastline", from 2009 to 2013. The photographs are colour again, but this time Zhang used a Mamiya 7 II camera. Zhang has described the coastline as "[China's] first area of impact from external culture and the rapid economic development; the series "records subtle and surreal moments of life by the sea".

Cited by Agnès Sire as showing an intimate and contemporary China without any exoticism, Coastline won Prix HSBC pour la photographie 2011, and as a result was widely exhibited and published in book form in Arles by Actes Sud in 2011. Three years later, a different selection was published in Kowloon by Jiazazhi Press, and a smaller selection in Tokyo by Zen Foto Gallery.

=== Envelopes ===
In China, photojournalists are offered cash for their positive comment on a topic they are covering. Although in his career as a photojournalist Zhang declined such offers of envelopes containing large sums of money where he considered it unconscionable to do so, he accepted those with smaller sums where he considered the topic insignificant. He collected the envelopes, which he has exhibited.

=== Shanxi ===
Zhang used a Holga again for the square, colour photographs of traditional rituals surrounding the lunar new year in Shaanxi. The book Shanxi was first published by Little Big Man in the United States; Sean O'Hagan describes it as "a seductive book, a glimpse of a world of pagan custom that somehow endures against the odds, dreamlike and entrancing".

== Exhibitions ==
- Envelope. Lianzhou International Photography Festival (Guangdong, China), 2009.
- They. Pingyao International Photography Festival (Pingyao, Shanxi, China), 2009.
- Coastline. Format International Photography Festival (Derby, England), March–May 2009.
- GIM, Galerie im Medienhaven (Bremen, Germany), 2010.
- She Huo = 社火. MIO Photo Award (Osaka), 2010.
- Coastline, Prix HSBC pour la Photographie; Galerie le Réverbère (Lyon), May–July 2011; Galerie Baudoin Lebon (Paris), September 2011; Galerie L'Arsenal (Metz), September–October 2011; Maison de la Photographie (Lille), November 2011.
- They. Blind Spot Gallery (Wong Chuk Hang, Hong Kong), March–April 2013.
- Shanxi. Pékin Fine Arts (Aberdeen, Hong Kong), October–December 2013. Pékin Fine Arts (Beijing), October–December 2013.
- Coastline = 海岸線. Zen Foto Gallery (Roppongi, Tokyo), September–October 2014.
- Coastline. Singapore International Photography Festival (Singapore), October–November 2014.

== Awards ==
- Houdengke Documentary Photography Award, 2009
- Three Shadows Photography Award, 2010.
- Southern Documentary Photography Award (China), 2010.
- Photography Talent Award (France), 2010.
- Finalist, MIO Photo Award (Japan), 2010.
- Prix HSBC pour la Photographie, 2011.

== Publications ==
=== Publications by Zhang ===
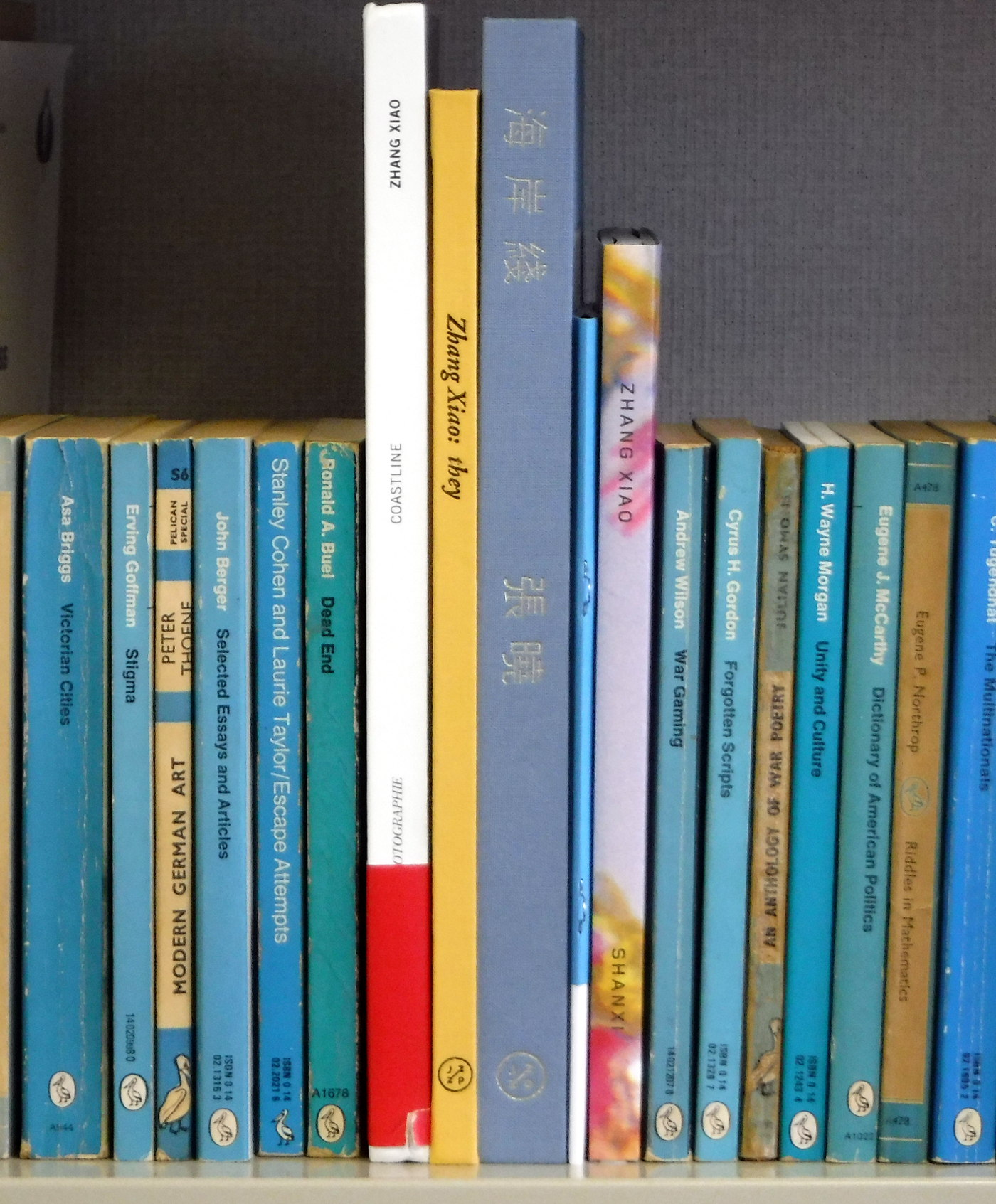
Some photobooks by Zhang Xiao (flanked by irrelevant Pelicans)

- Zhang Xiao 1. Geneva: Boabooks, 2010. ISBN 978-2-940409-30-3. Black and white photographs; no captions, no text; in notepad format. Edition of 40 copies. (Note: The edition size appears in the colophon. Boabooks' web page for Zhang Xiao 1 and Zhang Xiao 2, as it was on 14 September 2014, is available here at the Internet Archive.)
- Zhang Xiao 2. Geneva: Boabooks, 2010. ISBN 978-2-940409-31-0. Black and white photographs; no captions, no text; in notepad format. Edition of 40 copies.
- Coastline. Arles: Actes Sud, 2011. ISBN 978-2-7427-9763-9. Book of colour photographs, no captions. With a preface by Yan Changjiang and an afterword by Jiang Wei; texts in both French and English. (Note: Actes Sud's web page for Coastline is here. Accessed 8 October 2014.)
- They = 《他们》. N.p.: Jia Za Zhi Press, 2012. OCLC 861211083. Book of colour photographs, no captions; text in English and Chinese by Hai Jie (海杰). First edition of 500 copies. (Note: The spine and title page say only They and "Zhang Xiao"; the colophon adds 《他们》 and 张晓. Edition size stated in the colophon. Jiazazhi Press's web page for They is here. Accessed 8 October 2014.)
- They. Zine Collection 11. Paris: Éditions Bessard, 2014. ISBN 979-10-91406-14-7. Stapled booklet of colour photographs (no captions), with one small original print and text by Zhang in English. First edition of 250 copies. (Note: Edition size stated in the front. Éditions Bessard's information about They appears within a pop-up on its top page. Accessed 8 October 2014.)
- Shanxi. N.p.: Little Big Man, 2013. Book of colour photographs, no captions. First edition of 300 copies. (Note: Title and photographer's name are given in Roman letters only. Edition size stated in the colophon. Little Big Man's web page for Shanxi is here. Accessed 8 October 2014.)
- 《海岸綫》 (《海岸线》) = Coastline. Sham Shui Po, Kowloon: Jiazazhi Press, 2014. ISBN 978-988-12631-5-5. Book of colour photographs, no captions. With a booklet containing texts in both Chinese and English by Yan Changjiang (顔長江) and Gu Zheng (顧錚), and other material. First edition of 600 copies. (Note: 《海岸綫》 and 張曉 on the spine and in the colophon, Coastline and "Zhang Xiao" on the front cover and in the colophon, 《海岸线》 on the title page. Edition size stated in the colophon. The publisher's web page for Coastline is here. Accessed 8 October 2014.)
- 海岸線 = Coastline. Tokyo: Zen Foto Gallery, 2014. Stapled booklet of colour photographs; texts by Zhang and Gu Zheng in Japanese, Chinese and English. First edition of 500 copies. (Note: Shashasha's web page for Coastline is here. Accessed 8 October 2014.)

=== Publications with contributions by Zhang ===
- Unfamiliar Familiarities—Outside Views on Switzerland. Zürich: Lars Müller, 2017. Edited by Peter Pfrunder, Lars Willumeit, and Tatyana Franck. ISBN 978-3-03778-510-2. A six-volume set: one volume by Zhang and the others by Alinka Echeverría, Shane Lavalette, Eva Leitolf, Simon Roberts, plus a text volume in English, German, and French. Published to accompany an exhibition at Musée de l'Élysée, Lausanne, Switzerland.
