= Brian Ulrich =

American photographer (born 1971)

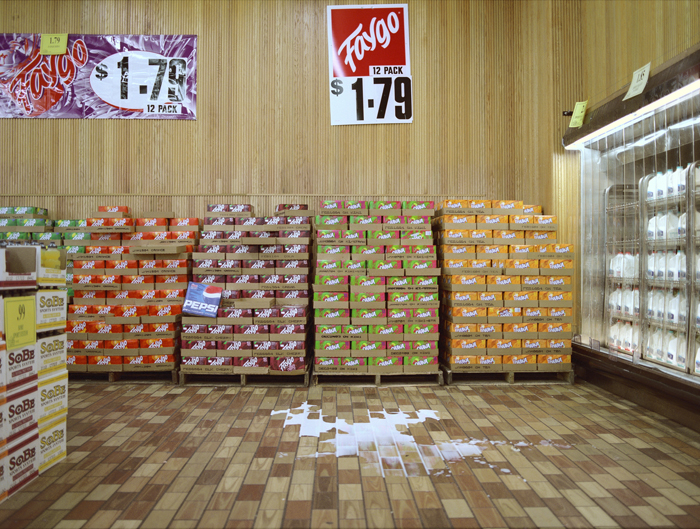
Photograph from Ulrich's Copia series

Brian Ulrich (born 1971) is an American photographer known for his photographic exploration of consumer culture.

== Life and work ==
Ulrich was born in Northport, New York, and lives in Providence, Rhode Island. He received a BFA in photography from University of Akron in Akron, Ohio (1996) and an MFA in photography from Columbia College Chicago (2004). He has taught photography at Columbia College Chicago and Gallery 37, both in Chicago; and at the University of Akron. He is an Associate Professor of Photography at the Rhode Island School of Design.

In 2001 in response to a national call for citizens to bolster the American economy through shopping, Ulrich began a project to document consumer culture. This project, Copia, is a series of large scale photographs of shoppers, retail spaces, and displays of goods. Initially focused on big-box retail establishments and shoppers, the series expanded to include thrift stores, back rooms of retail businesses, art fairs and most recently empty retail stores and dead malls.

Ulrich works with a combination of 4×5 large format and medium format cameras, and also incorporates found objects as sculpture, juxtaposed with his photographs on gallery walls.

== Publications ==
=== Publications by Ulrich ===
- Is This Place Great or What. New York: Aperture; Cleveland Museum of Art, 2011. ISBN 978-1597111928.
- Closeout: Retail Relics and Ephemera. Anderson Gallery, 2013. With an interview with and an essay by Will Steacy.

=== Publications with contributions by Ulrich ===
- MP3: Midwest Photographers Project. New York: Aperture, 2006. ISBN 978-1683951506.

== Exhibitions ==
=== Solo ===
- 12 x 12: Shoppers, Museum of Contemporary Art, Chicago (2005)
- Copia, Museum of Contemporary Art San Diego (2006–2007); Nerman Museum of Contemporary Art, Overland Park, KS (2008)

=== Group ===
- Manufactured Self, Museum of Contemporary Photography, Chicago, IL (2005)
- On the Scene, Art Institute of Chicago, Chicago, IL (2005)
- Photocentric, Minnesota Center for Photography, Minneapolis, MN (2005)
- MP3, Kelli Connell, Justin Newhall, and Brian Ulrich, Museum of Contemporary Photography, Chicago, (2006)
- Presumed Innocence: Photographic Perspectives of Children, DeCordova Museum, Lincoln, MA, (2008)
- World's Away: New Suburban Landscapes, Walker Art Center, Minneapolis, MN; Carnegie Museum of Art, Pittsburgh, PA (2008)
- Made in Chicago, Photographs from the LaSalle Bank Collection, Chicago Cultural Center, Chicago, IL (2008)

== Awards ==
- 2007: Photo District News 30 Emerging Photographers to Watch
- 2009: Guggenheim Fellowship in photography from the John Simon Guggenheim Memorial Foundation

== Collections ==
Ulrich's work is held in the following permanent collections

- Museum of Contemporary Art San Diego: 1 print (as of September 2020)
- Museum of Fine Arts, Houston
- Art Institute of Chicago: 4 prints (as of September 2020)
- Museum of Contemporary Photography, Chicago: 17 prints (as of September 2020)
