= Election Artist =

The Speaker's Advisory Committee on Works of Art of the British House of Commons chooses an official Election Artist to document the election campaigns in the United Kingdom's general elections.

The first Election Artist was Jonathan Yeo, who produced three portraits of party leaders for the 2001 United Kingdom general election.

== Artists ==
Election	Artist
2001	Jonathan Yeo
2005	David Godbold
2010	Simon Roberts
2015	Adam Dant
2017	Cornelia Parker
2019	Nicky Hirst
2019	Joanne Coates
