= Simon Roberts (photographer) =

British photographer (born 1974)

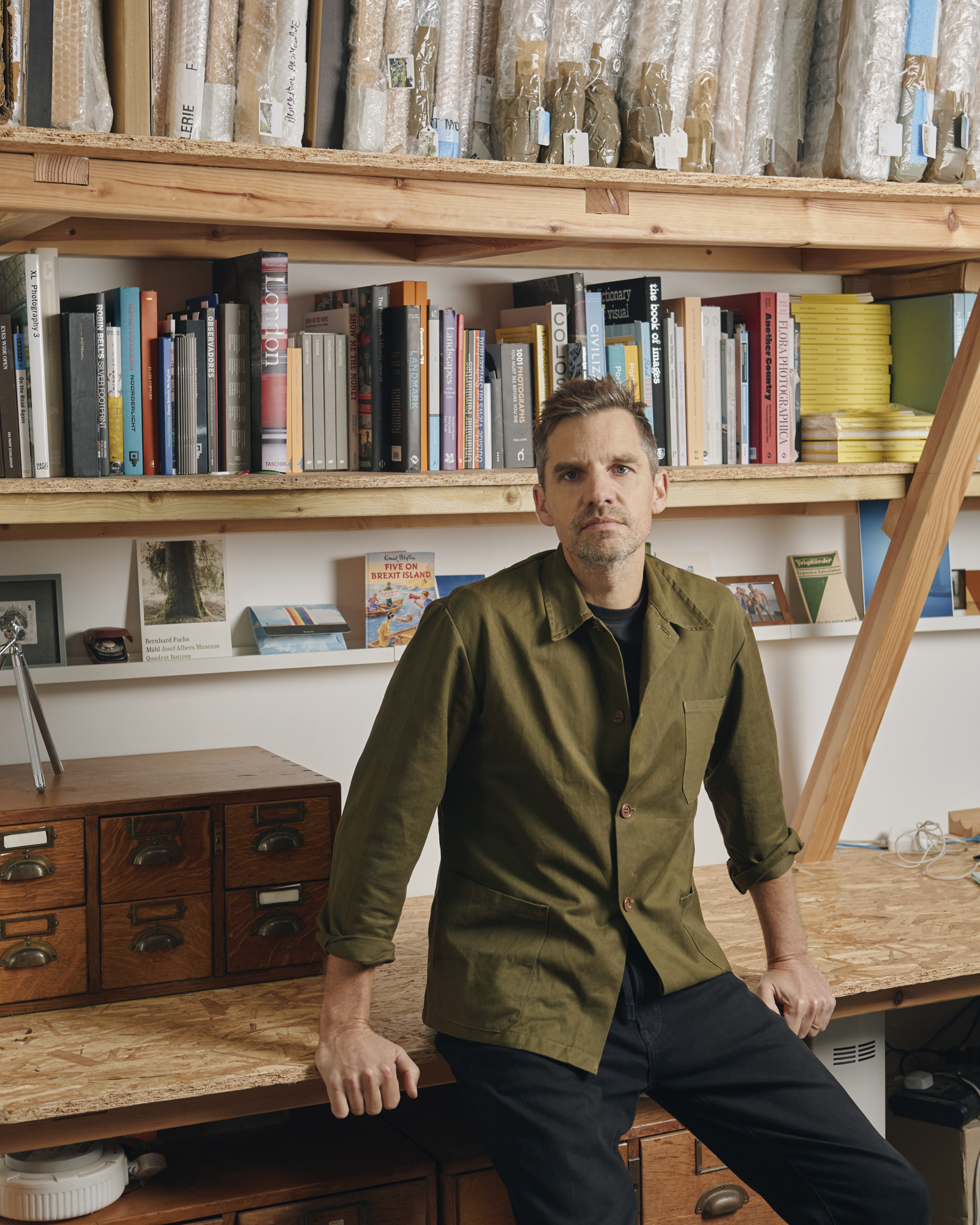
- Simon Roberts in his Brighton studio, 2022.
- Born: 5 February 1974 (age 52); Croydon
- Occupation: Photographer
- Website: simoncroberts.com

Simon Roberts (born 5 February 1974) is a British photographer. His work deals with peoples' "relationship to landscape and notions of identity and belonging."

Roberts' books include Motherland (2007), We English (2009), Pierdom (2013), and Merrie Albion (2017). His work has been exhibited internationally.

The Royal Photographic Society has awarded him an Honorary Fellowship and its Vic Odden Award, and he was commissioned by the UK parliament Speaker's Advisory Committee on Works of Art as the official 2010 British Election Artist.

== Life and work ==
Roberts studied a BA Hons in Human Geography at the University of Sheffield (1996). He currently lives in Brighton, England.

Between July 2004 and August 2005 Roberts travelled throughout Russia, taking in 65 destinations from Kaliningrad to Vladivostok. This resulted in the book and exhibition Motherland and the exhibition Polyarnye Nochi.

Between August 2007 and September 2008 Roberts travelled throughout England in a motor home using a large format camera capturing people at play, and exploring the relationship between people and the places they visit. This resulted in the book and exhibition We English. In the "Observer critics' review of 2011" Sean O'Hagan included the We English exhibition at Flowers East in London in his top 10 photography exhibitions of the year. Parr and Badger include the book We English in the third volume of their photobook history.

Roberts was commissioned by the UK parliament Speaker's Advisory Committee on Works of Art as the official Election Artist to document campaigning activity around the country in the run-up to the 2010 General Election. Roberts travelled the country, again in a motor home, using an old plate camera to photograph from the elevated position of its roof. This resulted in The Election Project touring exhibition and The Election Project Newspaper publication (which was made available free to download in 2012).

Roberts has also made other series of work: Polyarnye Nochi (polar nights), Star Chambers (2011), Landscapes of Innocence & Experience (2011), Credit Crunch Lexicon (2011–2012), Let This Be a Sign (2011–2012), Pierdom (2011–2012), The Last Moment (2011–2012) and XXX Olympiad (2012).

== Publications ==
=== Publications by Roberts ===
- Motherland. London: Chris Boot, 2007. ISBN 978-1-905712-03-8. (Note: Its website is motherlandbook.com.)
- We English. London: Chris Boot, 2009. ISBN 978-1-905712-14-4. (Note: Its website is we-english.co.uk.)
- Pierdom. Stockport: Dewi Lewis, 2013. ISBN 978-1-907893-40-7.
- Landscapes of Innocence & Experience. Eton: Verey Gallery, 2014. Work from various series including We English, The Election Project, XXX Olympiad and Pierdom. With an essay by Martin Caiger-Smith, "Settlement". Catalogue for an exhibition held at the Verey Gallery, Eton College, UK, 2015.
- Merrie Albion: Landscape Studies of a Small Island. Stockport: Dewi Lewis, 2017. ISBN 978-1-911306-19-1. With an introduction by David Chandler and texts by A. L. Kennedy, Alex Vasudevan, Carol Ann Duffy, David Matless, Frank Cottrell-Boyce, Ian Jeffrey, Irenosen Okojie, Nikesh Shukla, and Tristram Hunt.
- Green Lungs of the City. Paris: Bessard, 2018. Edition of 250 copies.

=== Newspapers, zines and postcards by Roberts ===
- The Election Project Newspaper. Self-published. 32-page Berliner format newspaper. (Note: Its website is theelectionproject.co.uk/blog/election-project-newspaper and simoncroberts.com/shop/election-project-newspaper/ where it was available to download.)
  - First edition, 2010. Edition of 3000 copies.
  - Second edition, 2013. Edition of 2000 copies.
- This Is a Sign. Self-published, 2012. 32-page newspaper. Edition of 2000 copies. (Note: Its web page is simoncroberts.com/shop/this-is-a-sign-newspaper/.)
- Credit Crunch Postcards. 2014. According to Roberts's website, "A pack of original postcards featuring different extracts of text from Simon's Credit Crunch Lexicon, launched to coincide with the exhibition 'Show Me The Money: The Image of Finance 1700 to the present' at the Northern Gallery of Contemporary Art."
- Boxing Boys: Britain 1997–1999. Southport: Café Royal, 2015. Edition of 200 copies.
- The Gray Friars of Canning Town. Southport: Café Royal, 2017. Edition of 150 copies.

=== Publications with contributions by Roberts ===
- Generation ’74. Kaunas, Lithuania: Kaunas Photo festival, 2015. ISBN 978-609-8032-10-9. Edited by Ángel Luis González and Irina Chmyreva. Includes profiles of and interview transcripts with eleven European photographers born in 1974: Simon Roberts, Nick Hannes, Kirill Golovchenko, Przemyslaw Pokrycki, Tomáš Pospěch, Mindaugas Kavaliauskas, Vitus Saloshanka, Gintaras Česonis, Borut Peterlin, Pekka Niittyvirta and Davide Monteleone. Edition of 500 copies.
- Unfamiliar Familiarities—Outside Views on Switzerland. Zürich: Lars Müller, 2017. Edited by Peter Pfrunder, Lars Willumeit, and Tatyana Franck. ISBN 978-3-03778-510-2. A six-volume set: one volume by Roberts and the others by Alinka Echeverría, Shane Lavalette, Eva Leitolf, and Zhang Xiao, plus a text volume in English, German, and French. Published to accompany an exhibition at Fotostiftung Schweiz, Winterthur, Switzerland and Musée de l'Élysée, Lausanne, Switzerland.
- The Great British Seaside: Photography from the 1960s to the Present. London: National Maritime Museum, 2018. ISBN 978-0948065989. Published to accompany an exhibition at the National Maritime Museum, London.

== Notable exhibitions ==
=== Solo exhibitions ===
- The Election Project, House of Commons, London, 2010.
- We English, National Media Museum, Bradford, UK, 2010; Klompching Gallery, New York, 2010; Robert Morat Galerie, Hamburg, 2010–2011; Brighton Museum & Art Gallery, Brighton and Hove, UK, 2011; mac, Birmingham, UK, 2011 (also with The Election Project); Light House gallery, Wolverhampton, UK, 2012; Pluie d’Images Festival, Brest, France, 2012.
- Motherland, Robert Morat Galerie, Hamburg, 2011.
- Let This Be a Sign, Swiss Cottage Gallery, London, 2012.
- Pierdom, Flowers Gallery, London, 2013; Klompching Gallery, New York, 2013; Robert Morat Galerie, Hamburg.
- Sight Sacralization: (Re)framing Switzerland Part 1 & Part 2, Hiroshima City Museum of Contemporary Art, Hiroshima, Japan, May–July 2018. Video.

=== Group exhibitions or exhibitions during festivals ===
- Unseen, Museum of Contemporary Art Shanghai, Shanghai, China, 2008. With work by unrepresented Chinese photographers and Roberts, Martin Kollar and Julia Fullerton-Batte.
- This Land Is Your Land, Museum of Contemporary Photography, Chicago, IL, 2008. Work by Roberto Bellini, Peter Granser, Caroline Hake, Christian Jankowski, Simon Roberts, Greg Stimac, and Bryan Zanisnik.
- Motherland, Belfast Exposed, Northern Ireland, 2008.
- Visions of Our Time, Deutsche Börse Art Collection, Berlin, 2009.
- Motherland/Homeland, EX3 Centro per l’Arte Contemporanea, Firenze, 2010. Alongside work by Francesco Carone.
- Landscape Studies of a Small Island, Multimedia Art Museum, Moscow, 2014. Includes work from Motherland, We English, The Election Project, Pierdom and other series. Curated by Karen McQuaid from The Photographers' Gallery, London. Part of the Britain in Focus theme of Photobiennale 2014, the UK-Russia Year of Culture.

== Awards ==
- 1998: Ian Parry Scholarship for young photographers
- 2007: Vic Odden Award, Royal Photographic Society, Bath, UK
- 2010: Third prize, World Press Photo contest in the Daily Life - Stories category, for We English.
- 2013: Honorary Fellowship, Royal Photographic Society, Bath, UK

== Collections ==
Roberts' work is held in the following permanent collections:

- Pallant House Gallery, Chichester, UK.
- Birmingham Central Library, Birmingham, UK.
- Collection of the Deutsche Börse Photography Foundation, Frankfurt, Germany.
- George Eastman Museum, Rochester, NY: 159 works.
- Museum of Contemporary Photography, Chicago, IL.
- National Media Museum, Bradford, UK.
- Nelson-Atkins Museum of Art, Kansas City, MO.
- Wilson Centre for Photography, London.
- Parliamentary Art Collection, London.
