= Zhang Xiao =

Zhang Xiao may refer to:

- Zhang Xiao (photographer) (born 1981), Chinese photographer
- Zhang Xiao (footballer) (born 1988), Chinese footballer

== See also ==
- Zhang Xiaoling (born 1957), Chinese para table tennis player
