= Daylight (magazine) =

- Editor: Taj Forer and Michael Itkoff
- Categories: Photography art photo book art book
- Frequency: Quarterly
- Founded: 2003
- Country: United States
- Based in: Chapel Hill, North Carolina
- Language: American English
- Website: http://www.daylightbooks.org/

Daylight is an English-language documentary photography magazine founded in 2003 by Taj Forer and Michael Itkoff and published by the Daylight Community Arts Foundation. Released quarterly, each issue features a series of selected photographs related to the issue's theme with explanatory essays written by the photographers. The magazine is progressive in outlook and portrays the effects of larger forces and trends on individuals, communities and landscapes. The magazine is headquartered in Chapel Hill, North Carolina.

Since 2010 Daylight has focused on its book publishing program as well as publishing long form features online.

== Published issues ==
Title	Released	No.	Photographers
Debut	Spring 2004	1	Alec Soth, Tom Rankin, Jen Szymaszek, and Sara Gomez
Iraq	Summer 2004	2	Susan Meiselas, Sean Hemmerle, Roger Hutchings, Bruno Stevens, Sheryl Mendez, Samantha Appleton, Daniel Pepper, and Amir Hassanpour
Sustainability	Fall 2004	3	Joel Sternfeld, David Maisel, Edgar Martins, Jeff Whetstone, and a Daylight project examining biodiesel production.
Israel/Palestine	Spring 2006	4	Simon Norfolk, Luc Delahaye, Kai Wiedenhöfer, Paolo Pellegrin, Ahikam Seri, Ori Gersht, Gilad Ophir, Noel Jabbour, and Noa Ben Shalom
Global Commodities	Fall 2006	5	Adam Broomberg, Oliver Chanarin, Ali Chraibi, Kadir van Lohuizen, Ivor Prickett, Heidi Schumann, Allan Sekula, elin o’Hara slavick, Ian Teh, Heinrich Voelkel, and Michael Wolf
The Atomic Issue	Fall 2007	6	Harold Edgerton, Robert Del Tredici, Carole Gallagher, Chris McCaw, Pierpaolo Mittica, Jürgen Nefzger, Simon Roberts, Richard Ros, Paul Shambroom, Ramin Talaie, Hiroshi Watanabe, and Yosuke Yamahata
Agriculture	Fall 2008	7	Michael Ableman, Wout Berger, Tessa Bunney, Jason Houston, Raoul Kramer, Eduardo Martino, Peter Menzel, Brad Phalin, Heinrich Riebesehl, Munem Wasif, and Hiroshi Watanabe
Afghanistan		8	Eren Aytuğ, Adam Broomberg & Oliver Chanarin, Teru Kuwayama & Balazs Gardi, Tim Hetherington, Aaron Huey, Yannis Kontos, Seamus Murphy, Moises Saman, Lana Slezic, Veronique de Viguerie, Farzana Wahidy, Beth Wald
Cosmos		9	Adam Bartos | Robert Canali | Linda Connor | Vincent Fournier | Stan Gaz | Sharon Harper | Jason Lazarus | Charles Lindsay | Noel Rodo-Vankeulen | Phillip Scott Andrews | Greg Stimac | Neilson Tam

== Daylight Multimedia ==
Daylight Multimedia publishes free monthly video podcasts featuring portfolios and narration from contemporary photographers. Podcasts have included Jeff Rich: Watershed, Christopher Sims: Guantanamo Bay, John Duncan: Bonfires, Joshua Lutz: Meadowlands, Joseph Johnson: Megachurches, and Darren Hauck: Elections in Guatemala.
