= Adam Dant =

British artist

Adam Dant (born 1967) is a Jerwood Drawing Prize-winning British artist (2002).

He has won praise from The Guardian and Financial Times for his Hogarthian graphic style. Among the artists that have inspired him, Dant lists Albrecht Dürer, Pieter Bruegel the Elder, J. M. W. Turner, George Cruikshank, Edward Burra and Saul Steinberg. Critics have most often liken Dant to William Hogarth, whose 18th-century satirical prints were created with a moral purpose in mind. "Mine are underpinned by subversion," Dant says, "dressed up in traditional clothes."

== Early life ==
Dant was born in Cambridge in 1967 but now lives and works in London. He was educated at the Liverpool School of Art (1987–1990, Graphic Design BA), the Maharaja Sayajirao University of Baroda Faculty of Fine Arts (1988) and the Royal College of Art (1989–1991, Fine Art Printmaking, MA).

== Career ==
In 1995, Dant created the Donald Parsnips Daily Journal, an art world pamphlet, that appeared daily for five years.

Dant subsequently made a reputation as the creator of "mockuments". These are works based on floor plans of the Louvre, the National Gallery and Tate Britain, in which flowcharts lead from image to image to create a psycho-history of the institution being anatomized.

Dant was the official Election Artist for the 2015 general election.

== Works ==
Dant's investigations into “the interconnectedness of everything” and the arcane, earnest and often quite bizarre “belief systems” that append themselves to such a concept are the artists starting point for large “sepia ink-on-paper” drawings which create “psycho-histories”, “Monuments” and “Panoramas of colliding histories and fictions”.

== Exhibitions ==
Dant has work in the collections of the Victoria and Albert Museum, New York's Museum of Modern Art, the Musee d’Art Contemporain in Lyons, The New Art Gallery Walsall, the Deutsche Bank and UBS collections, and in many leading private collections including that of Charles, Prince of Wales. He has exhibited at Tate Modern, the Hayward Gallery, The New Art Gallery Walsall and the Institute of Contemporary Arts. The art writer Anthony Haden-Guest describes the new work as "witty and richly complex". Dant has produced a contemporary almanac as part of Waddeson Manor's 2017 exhibition, 'Glorious Years: French Calendars from Louis XIV to the Revolution'.
