= Joanne Coates =

English documentary photographer and visual artist

Joanne Coates is an English photographer and visual artist. Born and based in North Yorkshire, she works across the North of England. Coates explores rurality, social histories of class, and inequalities relating to low income through photography, installations, and audio. In 2024 Joanne Coates was appointed the official Election Artist by UK Parliament.

Coates's work is included within the permanent collections of the Government Art Collection, the Middlesbrough Institute of Modern Art, Middlesbrough, and the Arts Council England Collection.

She has had solo exhibitions including at the Baltic Centre for Contemporary Art, the Royal Albert Hall, and Jerwood Space. A central theme in Coates's work is socio-economic class. She participated in the touring show "After the End of History: British Working Class Photography 1989–2024", which examined working class life through documentary photography.

She was awarded Baltic Centre for Contemporary Art Vasseur Artist Award in 2024.

== Early life and education ==
Coates was born in North Yorkshire. She studied BA Hons photography at the London College of Communication, part of the University of the Arts London.

== Career ==
Coates was the subject of a Simon Schama BBC Story of Us, Our Contested Land episode in February 2025, and a BBC Sounds 'Snapshots' show in 2017 Coates has featured on BBC Woman's Hour in 2022 and 2025.

== Personal life ==
She lives in the North of England and still works as a farm labourer.

Coates identifies as a disabled and neurodivergent artist. She has spoken about her experiences with autism and ADHD and how they influence her storytelling and creative process. Her work was included in "Towards New Worlds", an exhibition spotlighting disabled, D/deaf and neurodivergent artists.

== Awards and recognition ==
- The Baltic Vassuer Artist Award (2024)
- Jerwood/Photoworks Award (2021)
- Shutterstock Females in Focus Award (2021)
- Magenta Foundation Flash Forward Emerging Talent (2016)
- Hopper Prize finalist (2024)

== Notable exhibitions ==
- Daughters of the Soil, Farleys House and Gallery (2025)
- Red Herring, Timespan (2025)
- The Middle of Somewhere, Baltic Centre for Contemporary Art (2024)
- Daughters of the Soil, Vane (2022)
- Daughters of the Soil, The Maltings (2022)
- The Lie of the Land, Jerwood Space (2022)
