= Mari Bastashevski =

Danish artist, researcher, and author

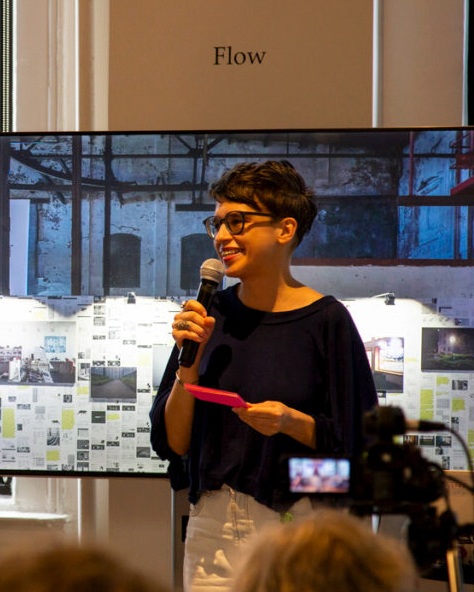
- Bastashevski in 2018
- Born: Saint Petersburg
- Occupation: Art
- Years active: From 2007
- Known for: Her long term investigative art works "State Business", "10.000 Things Out Of China", "Terra Incognita"

Mari Bastashevski is a Danish (previously stateless) artist, writer, and researcher. Her past works—usually a result of extensive online and field investigations—integrate documents, photographs, and texts to explore the role of new technology and social media in creating and sustaining conflicts in status quo. As of 2019 she has been engaged in modelling environments in VR and AR and researching the historical nexus between ecology, technology and cultural, environmental and political violence.

Pete Brook, writing for the Medium Matter, described her work as a "year-long investigation into the trade of cyber-surveillance systems to oppressive nation states."

She has exhibited with Château d'Oiron, The Photographers Gallery, Grand Palais, Bonniers Konsthall, Maison Populaire, Musée de l'Elysée, Haus der Kulturen der Welt, Art Souterrain, Noorderlicht, and has been published by Routledge, Time, The New York Times, Courrier International, Le Monde, e-flux, Vice among others. She was a 2019 artist in residency at Chateau D’Oiron, and a 2017–2018 technology fellow at Information Society Project at Yale and Data & Society Institute in New-York. She has also been awarded art residencies at IASPIS Stockholm and Cité des Arts in Paris. She has received production grants from Magnum Foundation, MAST foundation, Abigail Cohen Foundation, and Helvetia among others.

In 2016 she was named a Yale World Fellow.

== Biography ==
Bastashevski was born in Saint Petersburg. She studied fine art and political science. She holds a PhD in architecture and design. She has been active as an artist, writer, and an academic since 2005.
