= Jonathan Yeo =

British artist (born 1970)

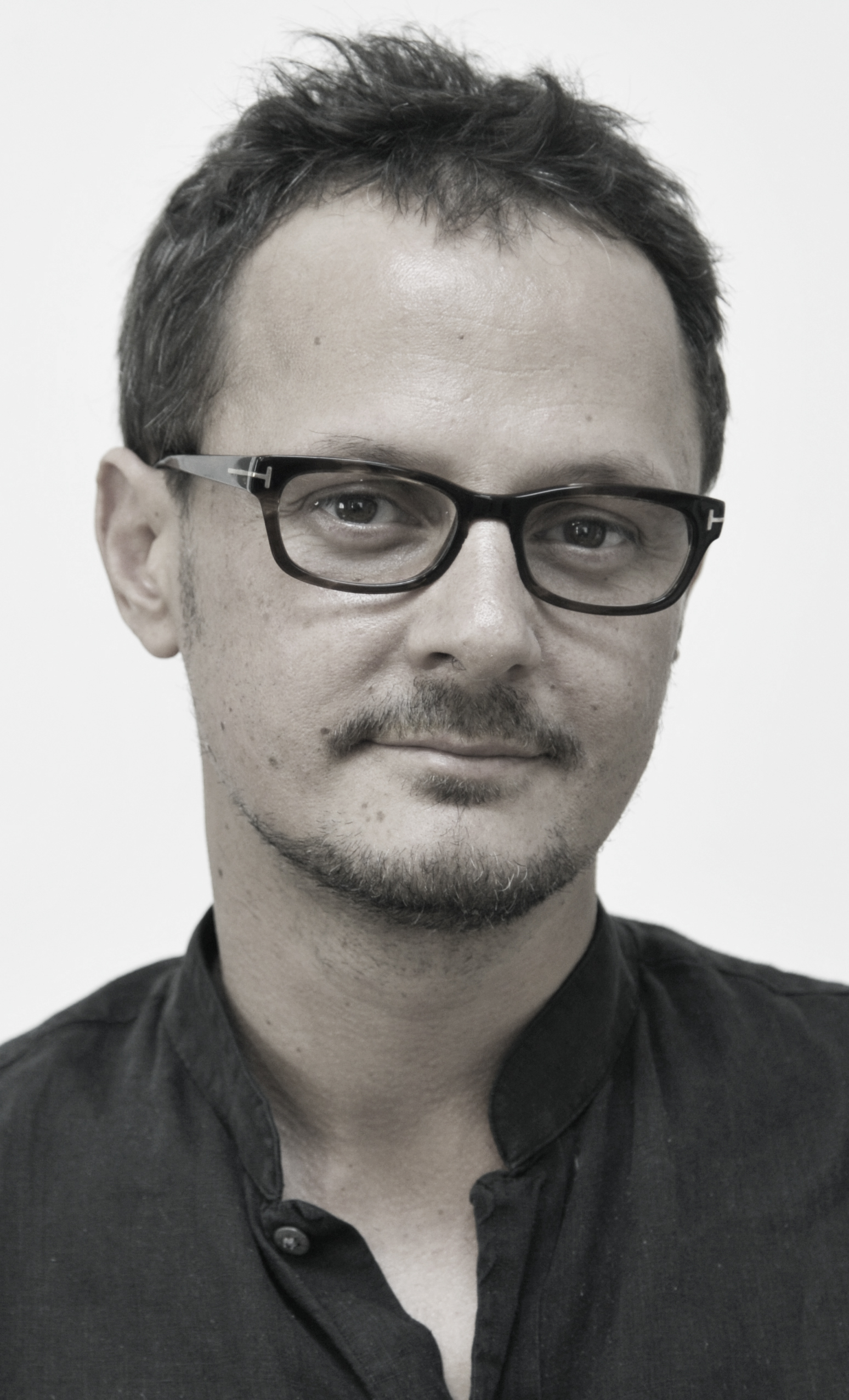
- Yeo in 2012
- Born: 18 December 1970 (age 55); London, England
- Education: Westminster School
- Known for: Portraiture
- Spouse: Shebah Ronay
- Children: 2
- Father: Tim Yeo

Jonathan Yeo (born 18 December 1970) is a British contemporary artist who specializes in both traditional and experimental forms of portraiture. His most celebrated paintings include King Charles III, Malala Yousafzai, Sir David Attenborough, Dennis Hopper, and Cara Delevingne, among others. GQ described him as "one of the world's most in-demand portraitists."

Yeo's work has been the subject of mid-career retrospectives at the National Portrait Gallery, London, in 2013, The Lowry, Manchester in 2014, the Laing Art Gallery, Newcastle-Upon-Tyne in 2015, the Museum of National History at Frederiksborg Castle, Denmark in 2016 and The Bowes Museum, Barnard Castle in 2018.

In 2007, his unauthorised portrait of American president George W. Bush, created from cuttings of pornographic magazines and shown in London, New York and Los Angeles, brought him worldwide notoriety.

Yeo was the subject of a BBC Culture Show Special in September 2013, and a BBC Maestro course in 'Portrait Painting' in 2024 The monograph The Many Faces of Jonathan Yeo, featuring works from throughout his career, was published by London-based publisher Art/Books in the same month. His paintings are included within the permanent collections of the National Portrait Gallery, London, the Laing Art Gallery, Newcastle, The Museum of National History at Frederiksborg Castle in Denmark, the Royal Academy of Arts and the Royal Collection.

In 2018 Yeo was appointed as a trustee of the National Portrait Gallery, London for four years and was reappointed in 2022 for a second term.

He was also awarded GQ Artist of the Year in 2018 which was presented to him by Baroness Doreen Lawrence.

== Early life and education ==
Yeo was born in London in 1970, to Tim Yeo, a Conservative MP and was educated at Westminster School. He first tried oil painting at the age of 14, encouraged by his grandmother.

Prior to beginning his career as an artist he studied English & Film Studies at the University of Kent. In his third year he received treatment for Hodgkin's disease.

Yeo is a self-taught artist whose earliest influences stemmed from the work of cubist painters Pablo Picasso, and Georges Braque and British artists, David Bomberg, Graham Sutherland, Stanley Spencer, Lucian Freud and Euan Uglow.

In 2017 he received an Honorary Doctorate of Art from the University of Kent.

== Career ==
=== Portraiture ===
In 1993, while undergoing chemotherapy, he made his first significant career breakthrough completing a portrait commission of Trevor Huddleston, the famous anti-apartheid campaigner.

Yeo was commissioned by the House of Commons as the official Election Artist for the 2001 general election, and he painted the leaders of the three largest parties. His triptych of Tony Blair, William Hague, and Charles Kennedy, entitled, 'Proportional Representation', had a conceptual element being made up of canvases sized according to the subjects' share of the vote. “Proportional Representation was his political debut and a response to the media-saturated general election of 2001.” Tim Marlow

Through the 2000s, he became known for his contemporary realist portraits of well-known figures. His subjects include the artists Sir Peter Blake and Turner Prize winner Grayson Perry, Savile Row taylor Ozwald Boateng, Prince Philip, Duke of Edinburgh, Queen Camilla, Former Apple Chief Design Officer Sir Jony Ive, actors Helena Bonham Carter, Jude Law, Kristin Scott Thomas, Lily Cole, Nicole Kidman, Giancarlo Esposito, Taron Egerton and Sophia Loren, the former Danish prime minister Helle Thorning-Schmidt, and media tycoon Rupert Murdoch. In 2005, his portrait of Erin O'Connor was used to advertise London's National Portrait Gallery around the world. The painting was used as the front cover of '500 Portraits', a survey of the BP Portrait prize published in 2011.

In January 2008, Yeo's official portrait of former prime minister Tony Blair was unveiled and struck a public chord with its clear Iraq war reference. It showed an older and wearier-looking Blair wearing a red poppy – a symbol of war remembrance for the British. In line with the political subjects that have featured throughout his work, in 2009, Yeo painted a full-length portrait of David Cameron just before his election to Prime Minister, which was sold at auction in 2010 for £200,000.

In April 2011, Queen Elizabeth II commissioned Yeo to paint a portrait of David Attenborough for the Royal Collection.

'Jonathan Yeo Portraits' at the National Portrait Gallery, London (2013–2014) included a selection of new and older works by Yeo. The new portraits included individuals who have made a significant mark on their field of expertise, including: the arts, theatre, and politics. Sitters include Doreen Lawrence, Kevin Spacey, Damien Hirst, Malala Yousafzai, and Grayson Perry and Idris Elba.

Between 2010 and 2012, Yeo created works based on cosmetic surgery procedures. He presents the faces of women in pre and post-operative states, as a counterpoint to the traditional portrait. This collection of paintings was the subject of two solo exhibitions, 'You're Only Young Twice' at Lazarides in London and ‘(I’ve Got You) Under My Skin' at Circle Culture Gallery in Berlin.

'Jonathan Yeo Portraits' at the National Portrait Gallery, London (2013–2014) included a selection of new and older works by Yeo. The new portraits included individuals who have made a significant mark on their field of expertise, including: the arts, theatre, and politics. Sitters include Doreen Lawrence, Kevin Spacey, Damien Hirst, Malala Yousafzai, and Grayson Perry.

In 2014, the exhibition was expanded at The Lowry in Salford where additional portraits were painted representing the city of Manchester including Maxine Peake and John Cooper Clarke. In 2015 it was expanded further at the Laing Art Gallery, Newcastle where new paintings included a portrait of Queen Camilla (Duchess of Cornwall at the time).

Yeo’s first major international retrospective opened at the Museum of National History at Frederiksborg Castle, Denmark in March 2016. Alongside 47 existing works, a new series of paintings of the actor and model Cara Delevingne was unveiled at the museum as part of the exhibition. This series of portraits was made over an eighteen-month period and is concerned with image making and performed identity. Yeo said: "the way we manipulate and read self-portrait images, or 'selfies', in the last five years has far more in common with the activity of the 16th-century portrait artists and audiences than any art movement since the birth of photography". A portrait of the former Danish Prime Minister, Helle Thorning-Schmidt, was also unveiled at the opening of this exhibition and will remain at the museum as part of its permanent collection. A new monograph, titled 'In The Flesh' was published by the museum to accompany the show where the primary text was written by British Art historian, Richard Cork.

In February 2016, Yeo's portrait of the actor Kevin Spacey in the role of President Francis J. Underwood, from the Netflix series House of Cards, was unveiled at the Smithsonian National Portrait Gallery in Washington, DC. Spacey unveiled the painting in character as the fictional President Underwood, joking "I'm pleased the Smithsonian continues to prove itself as a worthwhile institution. I'm one step closer to convincing the rest of the country that I am the president." Netflix made a short film of the collaboration between the museum, actor, and artist to promote the fourth season of House of Cards, which premiered that same evening.

In May 2024, Yeo's portrait of King Charles III, His Majesty King Charles III, was unveiled at Buckingham Palace and quickly became a worldwide phenomenon online, “the painting that “sparked a million memes". The portrait, which was painted between June 2021 and November 2023, a period encompassing Charles' accession to the throne, was the first official portrait of the King since his coronation. Measuring about 8 feet 6 inches (2.59 m) by 6 feet 6 inches (1.98 m) in its frame, the work is in a vivid red and shows Charles in the uniform of the Welsh Guards. The BBC described it as "a vibrant painting", and Queen Camilla reportedly told Yeo approvingly: "Yes, you've got him."

=== Pornographic Collage ===
The Pornographic Collage Series was a sudden departure by Yeo from paint into collage, with the first of these unorthodox works being the portrait titled Bush, which was made in 2007 after an official commission to paint the then President of the United States, George W. Bush, fell through. Yeo's initial frustration led him to making this playful but explicit, collage satirizing the assumed moral superiority of the extreme right in American politics.

The use of clippings from hardcore pornographic magazines as the medium, instead of paint on canvas, gave a humorous and subversive edge to the works. This series, initially known as his ‘Blue Period’, with an exhibition of the same title opening in 2008 at Lazarides Gallery in Soho, saw him depict subjects as diverse as the moral crusader Mary Whitehouse, to Playboy founder Hugh Hefner and portrait painter Lucian Freud; whose fleshy reworking of his famous self-portrait can be seen as a tongue-in-cheek passing of the torch between generations.

“In Yeo’s work, magazine cuttings are used in a similar way to paint. They often become abstract – though pornographic details do rear their provocative heads. They are placed to echo brushstrokes and slabs of colour. The skin-toned paper shapes make the body appear almost sculptural, like the paintings of Lucian Freud, Jenny Saville or even Cubism. The pictures look more finished and painterly than rough-and-ready cut and paste,” Francesca Gavin – Cutting Illusions 2008.

Unlike any of Yeo's painted portraits, none of the subjects of Yeo's collage works are a result of any personal connection with the artist. Rather they are based on the subject's public reputations and, whether rightly or wrongly, they are understood to have traded on their sexuality, nudity or their attitudes towards morality, which is now inseparable from their public image.

The series was further developed into a larger exhibition of the collages, ‘Porn in the USA’ which opened in West Hollywood, USA in July 2010 and included new portraits including Tiger Woods, Sean Connery, Paris Hilton, Sarah Palin and Sigmund Freud alongside a series of decorative wallpaper also made from pornography.

=== Cosmetic surgery ===
Between 2008 and 2018, Yeo created a series of paintings based on cosmetic surgery procedures. He presents the faces and bodies of, predominantly, women in pre and post-operative states, as a counterpoint to the traditional portrait. This collection of paintings was the subject of three solo exhibitions, 'You're Only Young Twice' at Lazarides in London, ‘(I’ve Got You) Under My Skin' at Circle Culture Gallery in Berlin and the retrospective ‘Skin Deep at The Bowes Museum in Barnard Castle.

Yeo’s Aesthetic Surgery Series, begun in 2011, seeks to explore the prevalent trend for cosmetic surgery and the quest for physical ‘perfection’. The concept behind the series first captured Yeo's interest in 2008 when, In dialogue with surgeon friends, Dr Martin Kelly and Dr Miles Berry, Yeo investigated the role of the surgeon as artist or sculptor, and witnessing various operations first hand allowed him to fully engage with this other form of ‘artistry’, which Yeo has described as, “like watching a master craftsman”. It occurred to him that in the same way artists in the pre-photographic era, such as Van Dyck, would often slightly improve their subject's appearance in an idealistic style, the job of the cosmetic surgeon is to sculpt and tweak people into a more idealized version of themselves. In the paintings that depict the lines drawn onto the skin of the patient, showing where the flesh will be cut, pulled and sculpted, the marks allude to the hand of the surgeon and the necessary preciseness that the procedures demand. “I’m documenting the artistry, as plastic surgeons really understand the structure of the human body,” Yeo says. “In the most fundamental way, they’re sculpting with bodies, and there’s an artistry, combined with a casual savagery, to the way they mark their patients before surgery.” Clover Stroud, Sunday Times.

The paintings, which depict procedures such as facelifts, breast enhancements and gender reassignments amongst others, recall the works of Rembrandt and Leonardo da Vinci who depicted human bodies according to their own surgical research. Originally coming at it from the perspective of a portraitist, Yeo has cited the "individual psyche," and collective perceptions of beauty as the core meaning behind his works. Furthermore, he says that since the appetite for procedures will vary at different points in a life, and surgeons are constantly making advances in the science, plastic surgery remains "a rapidly evolving area," and an ongoing lens through which to consider people's motivations and preoccupations.

=== Technology ===
Yeo is reported to be fascinated by the intersection of art and technology and has worked on projects with Google, Apple and Snapchat amongst others.

In 2017 he collaborated with Google and Otoy to make first ever bronze sculpture using an innovative combination of 3D scanning, virtual reality and 3D printing. The final piece was included in the Royal Academy of Arts’ 250th anniversary exhibition ‘From Life’ in 2018 and shown alongside sculptures by Antony Gormley and Yinka Shonibare. As part of the continuing anniversary celebration Jonathan hosted the RA's first ever live-streamed life class to highlight their 250-year tradition of life drawing. It was broadcast across all social media platforms where users from all over the world were invited to participate live from their homes alongside the artists and students in the room.

While isolating in the COVID lockdown of 2020 and unable be in the same room as his sitters Yeo embarked on a new series of paintings called FaceTime Portraits which he painted via video call on an iPad. The first two subjects were Dexter Fletcher and Professor Brian Cox painted via 4 sittings each that were directly live streamed to YouTube and Instagram Live. The final two subjects were Fearne Cotton and Jamie Oliver, which were filmed privately, then uploaded to YouTube.

Also in 2020 Jonathan and his studio created an immersive augmented reality app which invites to the user to explore his painting studio while he is painting his ‘Facetime portrait’ of Jamie Oliver. In 2021 it won a Lovie Award for ‘Best Use of Augmented Reality’, and was nominated for a Design Week Award for App Design.

In 2024 Yeo collaborated with Snapchat to create 3 Snap lenses based upon different styles of his paintings. Using AI technology the Snap augmented reality systems were trained on the back catalogue of Jonathan's paintings so that users can see themselves as if they have had their portrait painted by Jonathan. The three styles of his paintings represented by the lenses are 'Painterly', 'Realist', and 'King Charles' where the user can see themselves painted in the style of his 2024 portrait of King Charles III.

== Curating and judging ==
Yeo is the co-founder of the Art collection at the Soho House group with Nick Jones. He initially co-curated the clubs worldwide with Francesca Gavin, before hiring Kate Bryan in 2016 as head curator. The collection has become one of the biggest contemporary collections in the world with over 10.000 pieces across 4 continents. He designed the now notorious, pornographic leaf wallpaper that adorns several of its walls, including the Dean Street Townhouse in London, Soho House West Hollywood and Soho House, Berlin.

Jonathan Yeo was a judge for the 2010 Art Fund Prize for museums.

In 2014 Yeo was on the panel of judges for the BP Portrait Prize.

In 2021 Yeo was judge for the Venice Film Festival: Immersive.

== Controversy ==
Yeo created a controversial portrait of George W Bush in 2007, entitled 'Bush', which gained worldwide attention. After a commission to paint the US president was reportedly awarded and then withdrawn, Yeo created an image of the President anyway, making a collaged portrait from pornography. The work led to Yeo exhibiting more collages – mainly portraits and nudes – made in the same way.

At the first of these exhibitions in 2008, Yeo presented 'Blue Period' at Lazarides Gallery, owned by Steve Lazarides, a specialist dealer in outsider and street art, known for launching Banksy's career. The show included the Bush porn portrait as well as new collages of Hugh Hefner and Lucian Freud.

'Porn in the USA', Yeo's first US solo show, was staged by Lazarides, taking place in Beverly Hills, Los Angeles, and was met by critical acclaim. Following on from the success of 'Bush' (2007), this exhibition included portraits of Tiger Woods and Sarah Palin created from pornographic collage cutouts.

Yeo had two works involved in the dispute over the sale of the late Dennis Hopper's art collection. He was one of only three artists to have been commissioned by Hopper to paint his portrait, the other two being Andy Warhol and Julian Schnabel. Hopper described his work as 'timeless and exquisite'.

In June 2024, while Yeo's portrait of King Charles III was being exhibited at the Philip Mould Gallery in Central London, the painting was attacked by animal rights protestors. They pasted over the royal portrait with a picture of Wallace, a character from the Wallace and Gromit animations. It was a protest message criticising the welfare standards of RSPCA "assured farm" status, with King Charles a patron of the RSPCA. The painting was not damaged to due its glazing.

== Critical reception ==
In his Guardian review of the Blair portrait, Jonathan Jones accuses Yeo and his subject of conspiring to manipulate the image of the former PM, claiming that, 'Blair is a tacit co-conspirator who walked in wearing the poppy, then sat as bleak as he looks here, in invitation to the artist to home in on that tell-tale paper flower'.

Some commentators have suggested that, by making portraits and other work which poke fun at the politicians and celebrities they depict, he risks alienating the very people whom he used to paint very successfully. NPG director Sandy Nairne was reported as being concerned about Yeo pushing the porn collage theme too far saying 'the Bush collage was a riposte. And there was a certain logic in that riposte. What is more puzzling is what happens after that.'

Charles Saumarez-Smith, former Director of the National Gallery and Royal Academy, said of the porn-collage of Lucian Freud, 'Yeo is the young rising star of portraiture and Freud is the acknowledged master. It's a homage that has its tradition in the past. Painters would quite often do portraits of other artists they admired. Admittedly this one of Freud is rather different as Yeo has used this other dimension – people's private parts.'

At the launch of Yeo's National Portrait Gallery show, The Guardian described him as 'one of the UK's most highly regarded portrait artists', and GQ named him 'one of the world's most in-demand portraitists'. Malala Yousafzai revealed she was touched that Yeo asked to paint her and 'honoured' that her picture would hang in the National Portrait Gallery.

In 2024, following the unveiling of Yeo's painting of King Charles III, the portrait garnered international media attention for a number of weeks due to its unconventional take on the traditions of royal portraiture, particularly its use of the colour red across the entire piece. The artwork was the subject of customised online videos, often using the film of its unveiling at Buckingham Palace to display different content.

The Spectator called the portrait "a triumph", and art historian Philip Mould said "he has succeeded in doing is combining the elusive quality of majesty with an edginess" and called it "something of a unicorn."

Alternatively, the Seattle Times referred to it as "too vampiric" and the New York Post wrote that it "Looks like he's in hell".

== Personal life ==
He lives in London with his wife Shebah Ronay and two daughters.

== Notable exhibitions ==
Solo shows:

- Skin Deep, The Bowes Museum, Barnard Castle, 18 March 2018 – 17 June 2018
- The Museum of Danish National History at Frederiksborg Castle, 20 March 2016 – 30 June 2016
- Exposure, Circle Culture Gallery, Hamburg, 10 July 2015 – 28 October 2015
- The Laing Art Gallery, Newcastle upon Tyne, 8 November 2014 – 15 February 2015
- The Lowry Gallery, 14 March 2014 – 29 June 2014
- National Portrait Gallery, 11 September 2013 – 5 January 2014
- (I’ve Got You) Under My Skin, Circle Culture Gallery, Berlin, 9 November 2012 – 28 February 2013
- You're Only Young Twice, Lazarides, London, 9 December 2011 – 21 January 2012
- Porn in the USA, Lazarides LA, Beverly Hills, 9 July – 8 August 2010
- Blue Period, Lazarides, London, 5 June – 11 July 2008
- Jonathan Yeo's Sketchbook, Eleven, London, 17 February – 17 March 2006
