= Shebah Ronay =

British actress

Shebah Ronay (born 1972, London) is a British former actress, known for her film and television career from 1989 to 1998, including, Reunion (1989), Hollyoaks (1995–1996) and The Man Who Cried (1993). She is married to artist Jonathan Yeo. They have two children. She is the granddaughter of the Hungarian-born food critic Egon Ronay and the daughter of fashion designer and former actress Edina Ronay.

== Filmography ==
- Reunion (1989), Young Countess Gertrud
- The Man Who Cried (1993), Daphne
- Things We Do for Love (1998), Girl (short film)

== Television ==
- Hollyoaks (1995–1996), Natasha Andersen
- Game On (1995), Hairdresser / Jessica
- Love Hurts (1994), Receptionist
- The House of Eliott (1994), Jessica Armstrong
- Covington Cross (1992), Antonia
