= Andrejs Grants =

Latvian photographer and teacher (born 1955)

- Born: March 7, 1955 (age 70); Riga, Latvia
- Education: Latvian State University
- Known for: Photography
- Awards: Higashikawa Prize

Andrejs Grants (born March 7, 1955) is a Latvian photographer and teacher. He studied at the Latvian State University (1973–78), worked in the “Ogre” photo studio (1978–1988). From 1979 he is a teacher at the House of Technical Innovation in Riga, where he gained his reputation as an influential photography teacher of many Latvian contemporary photographers, film-makers and artists, such as Ritums Ivanovs, Arnis Balčus and Gints Bērziņš. At "Ogre" photo studio he formed an informal group "A" with photographers Inta Ruka, Valts Kleins and Gvido Kajons. Having influences by documentary photographers, such as Henri Cartier-Bresson and Robert Frank, group "A" used a reportage style to document everyday life of Soviet Latvia, very often creating photographs full of criticism. Andrejs Grants gained international recognition by collaborating with group "A" ideological leader Egons Spuris' widow Inta Ruka. Their project "Latvia: Changing and Unchanging Reality" has been shown internationally. Similar to Ruka's work, Andrejs Grants' main theme are the people in Latvia. His photographs record a variety of Latvian people of different social levels, professions, nationalities, generations, people in their usual surroundings – in the city or countryside, at work or at home, in festivities or alone. In 2002 a monography "Andrejs Grants" was released by Neputns with a selection of his best work.
