= Michael Itkoff =

Michael Itkoff is an artist and cofounder of both Fabl and Daylight Books.

For over a decade, Itkoff has been deeply involved in the publishing industry in both print and digital media. In addition, he has written for the NYTimes Lens blog, Art Asia Pacific, Nueva Luz, Conscientious blog and the Forward.

Itkoff’s photographic and video work is in public and private collections in the United States, and his work has appeared on the covers of Orion, Katalog, Next City and Philadelphia Weekly. Itkoff was the recipient of the Howard Chapnick Grant for the Advancement of Photojournalism (2006), a Creative Artists Fellowship from the Pennsylvania Arts Council (2007), and a Puffin Foundation Grant (2008). Itkoff’s monograph Street Portraits was published by Charta Editions in 2009. A featured interview on LensCulture contains information about Daylight's evolution and samples of Itkoff's work.
