= Thomas Wrede =

German photographer (born 1963)

Thomas Wrede (born 1963) is a German photographer.

== Life and work ==
Wrede was born in Iserlohn-Letmathe. He studied art at the Academy of Fine Arts in Münster from 1985 to 1991 and later returned as a professor of photography. In 1991 he was the student of Dieter Appelt in Salzburg and Berlin.

He has been included in exhibitions such as Strange Paradise at Städtische Galerie Iserlohn, 2005; Seascapes. Am Meer at Goethe-Institut London and in Helsinki, 2006; Tamed Nature at Brandenburgische Kunstsammlungen, 2005, in Germany; Really True! The Assurance of Reality in Photography at Ruhrlandmuseum Essen, 2004, in Germany; and the Paradise of the Modern at Bauhaus Dessau in Germany. In 2007 he exhibited Real Landscapes at Galerie Herrmann & Wagner, Berlin and Von Oben und von Unten, at Akademie Franz Hitze Haus, Münster.

Published collections of Wrede's work include Strange Paradise (2005), Magic Worlds (2000), Birds Hang in the Air and Crey (1996), Samsoe (1994) and Places and Constellations (1993).

== Subject Matter ==
Wrede's work explores humanity's relationship with nature, including the human affinity for nature and its mediated reception in organic or natural forms. Wrede has acknowledged a creative debt to German philosophy, particularly philosophers such as Immanuel Kant and Friedrich Hegel, who studied the dialectic relation to nature.

Wrede's Real landscapes series features manipulations of landscapes. By adding artificial details into real nature, he creates a staged scenes that blend authenticity with artifice, encouraging viewers to question their perception of nature.
