= František Dostál =

Czech photographer (1938–2022)

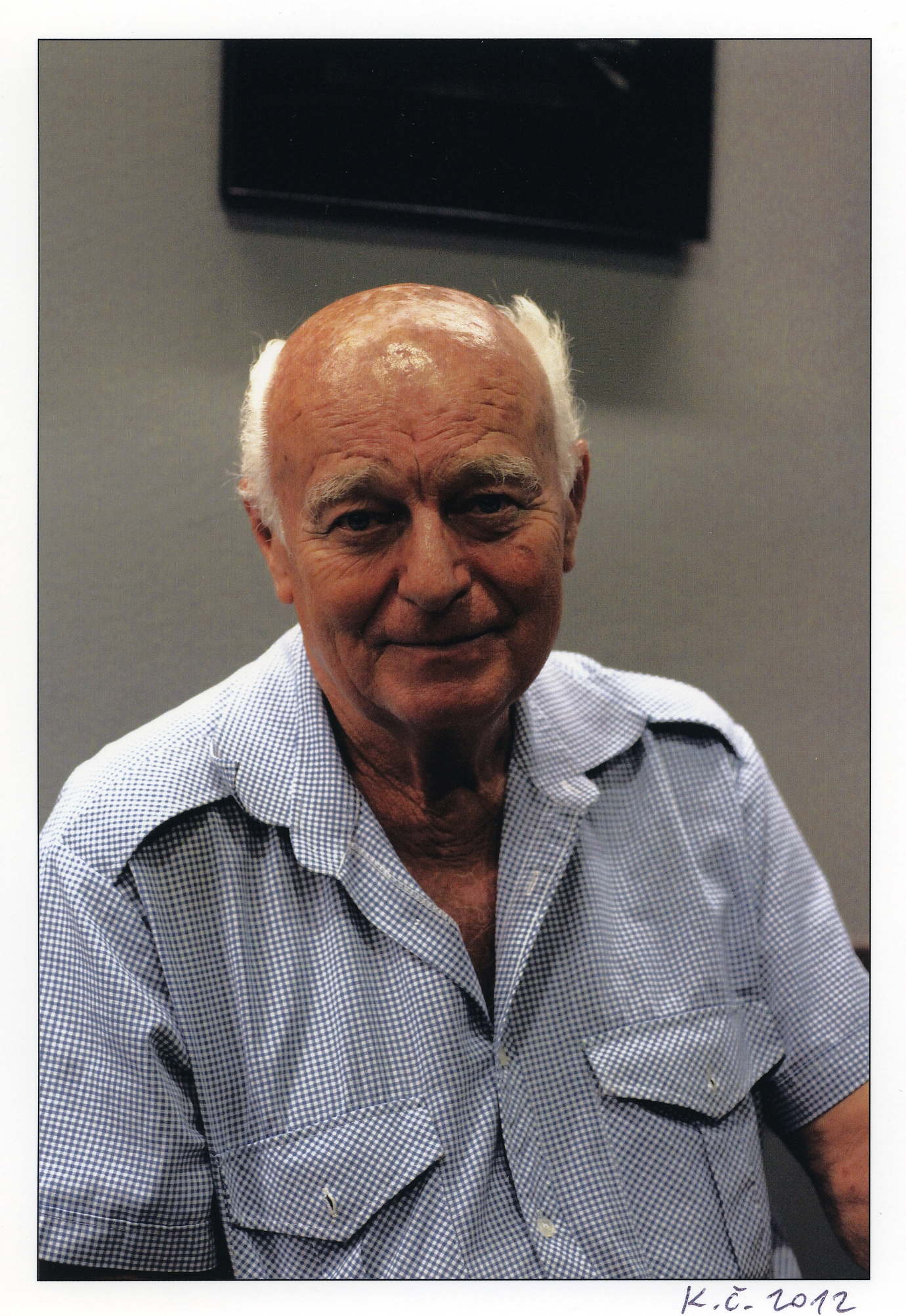
- Born: 21 July 1938; Prague, Czechoslovakia
- Died: 5 December 2022 (aged 84); Prague, Czech Republic

František Dostál (21 July 1938 – 5 December 2022) was a Czech photographer.

== Life and career ==
Born in Prague, the son of a maid and a tailor, during his youth Dostál was a junior national champion in high jump, and a record holder in the sprint relay and high jump. He studied at the Industrial School of Mechanical Engineering and got his first camera at 16 years old. He got his first published photo in 1964, in the weekly magazine Květy. His favorite subjects were ordinary people randomly picked on Prague's streets, and one of his favorite locations was the Sázava Swimming Pool. His most famous work is Letní lidé ("Summer People"), a collection of photographs taken between 1968 and 1990 in the village of Zlenice, on the banks of the Sázava river.

During his career Dostál held about 70 exhibitions, published 20 photo-books and collaborated with numerous magazines and newspapers; his archives consist of several thousand photographs. In spite of his success, he never abandoned his main profession as a machine tool designer. He received over one hundred awards, including in 2008 the Ministry of Culture of the Czech Republic’s Prize for his lifelong contribution to amateur photography. He died on 5 December 2022, at the age of 84.
