= The Invisible Dog Art Center =

Museum and arts center in New York City

Coordinates: 40.68716°N 73.99119°W

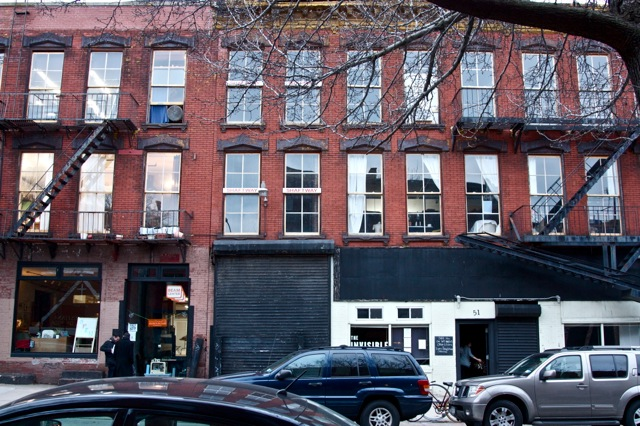
The street view of the Invisible Dog Art Center at 51 Bergen Street.

The Invisible Dog Art Center is a museum and arts center in Boerum Hill, Brooklyn, New York City, established by Lucien Zayan in 2009. The center gets its name from being a former invisible dog factory. Some buckles, belts, molds, and industrial fixtures remain as remnants throughout the building. The Art Center now plays host to performance and visual art, as well as artists in residence, some of whom have taken on inspiration from the industrial nature of their surroundings.

== History ==
Lucien Zayan pitched his idea to the owner after discovering the space in 2008. Upon taking ownership, Zayan immediately cleaned the building, collected all the remnants from the building's days as a factory, and held a flea market. He later said, "What was junk at first glance turned out to be a treasure-trove of vintage merchandise and furniture–particularly the thousands of belts on hand from the 1960s."

In March 2013, American video game and art magazine Kill Screen used the building to host the 2013 two5six conference, which is held every year in a different location throughout New York City.

== Building ==
The Invisible Dog's location at 51 Bergen Street was built in 1863. The building was purchased in the 1950s as a factory to produce belts and jewelry. In the 1970s, the novelty concept of the invisible dog was invented here. When Lucien Zayan came across the building in 2008, "the building was packed full of stuff and junk and furniture. All 68 windows were broken and needed to be replaced."

The building has an operational manual freight elevator and displays a mural by Giuseppe Stampone along the shaft (c. 2009) of illustrated text from Dante's Inferno (in the original Italian).
