= Nicky Hirst =

English sculptor and installation artist

Nicky Hirst (born 27 February 1963 in Nottingham) is an English artist. She is represented by Domobaal Gallery, London.
