= Kelli Connell =

American photographer

- Born: 1974 (age 51–52); Oklahoma City, Oklahoma, United States
- Education: Texas Woman's University
- Known for: Photography
- Movement: Contemporary; Surrealist

Kelli Connell (born 1974) is an American contemporary photographer. Connell is known for creating portraits, which may appear as self-portraits. Her work is held in the collections of the Columbus Museum of Art, the High Museum of Art, the Los Angeles County Museum of Art, the Museum of Fine Arts Houston, the Museum of Contemporary Photography and the Dallas Museum of Art.

== Early life and education ==
Kelli Connell was born in 1974 in Oklahoma City, Oklahoma. Connell took her first photography class as a junior in high school, and was influenced early on by the work of Roni Horn, Francesca Woodman, and Larry Sultan. She received her BFA in Photography and Visual Arts Studies at the University of North Texas. In 2003, Connell received her Masters in Fine Arts in Photography and a minor in Art history from Texas Woman’s University.

== Artistic career ==
Connell became a photographer to explore how photography can raise questions. In 2011, Decode Books released her first monograph, Double Life, in which she presented 36 color photographs of two young women occupied in their day to day activities of pleasure and reflection. Double Life seeks to question ideas of identity, gender roles, and expectations made by society on the individual. The series, which depicts a woman in a romantic relationship with herself, shows the "couple" having intimate and private moments in their lives. Connell uses her art to define the multiple sides of the self in the overall human experience. The portraits are also a case of identity. Connell worked with the same model over a series of years to produce the work.

Until 2025, she served as a professor at Columbia College Chicago, where she taught, mentored, and "established herself as part of an important group of Chicago photographers exploring a distinctive brand of psychological portraiture."

== Collections ==
- Columbus Museum of Art
- Dallas Museum of Art
- Los Angeles County Museum of Art
- "Carnival", 2006, Metropolitan Museum of Art, New York City
- Museum of Contemporary Photography
- Museum of Fine Arts Houston

== Group Exhibitions ==
- FEEL ME, Trapholt Museum of Modern Art and Design, Denmark, 2024
- Gorgeousness, Benrubi Gallery, New York, NY, 2024
- o_ Man!, Kelli Connell and Natalie Krick, Silver Eye Center for Photography, Pittsburgh, PA, 2024
- Traces on the Landscape, Princeton University Art Museum, Princeton, NJ, 2023
- All Roads are Open: Traveling Women Photographers Kunstforum Hermann Stenner, Bielefeld, Germany, 2023
- OFF-SPRING: New Generations, 21c Museum, Chicago, IL, 2023
- Refracting Histories, Museum of Contemporary Photography, Chicago, IL, 2022
- Rewriting Art History, Photographic Center Northwest, Seattle, WA, 2022
- Gaze Maze II: Seeing Double, Elsa Art Space, Bielefeld, Germany, 2022
- ~~Tomorrow~~, and ~~Tomorrow~~, and ~~Tomorrow,~~ The Design Museum of Chicago, Chicago, IL, 2022
- Collaborating with the Archive, Filter Photo, Chicago, IL, 2021
- Selections from the Permanent Collection: Contemporary Art, Westmont Ridley-Tree Museum of Art, Santa Barbara, California, 2021
- Keeper of the Hearth, Houston Center for Photography, Houston, TX, 2020

== Solo Exhibitions ==
- Living with Modernism: Kelli Connell's Pictures for Charis and Double Life, Elmhurst Art Museum, Elmhurst, IL, 2026
- Center for Creative Photography, Tucson, AZ Cleveland Museum of Art, Cleveland, OH, 2025
- High Museum of Art, Atlanta, GA, 2024
- Pictura Gallery, Bloomington, IN Silver Eye Center for Photography, Pittsburgh, PA, 2023
- Sheldon Museum of Art, Lincoln, NE Blue Sky Gallery, Portland, OR, 2022
- Center for Photography Woodstock, NY Alice Austen House, Staten Island, NY, 2021
- Double Life, Columbus Museum of Art, Columbus, Ohio, 2004
- Kelli Connell: Photographs, Kendall College of Art and Design, Ferris State University, Grand Rapids, Michigan, 2009

== Interviews ==
- Kelli Connell - Episode 73, PhotoWork with Sasha Wolf, February 29, 2024
- Q+A: Kelli Connell, Strange Fire with Jess T. Dugan, January 4, 2018

== Publications ==
- Double Life. Seattle: Decode 2011. With Susan Bright. ISBN 978-0-9793373-9-0.
- Pictures for Charis. Aperture 2024. ISBN 978-1-5971155-9-9.

== Personal life ==
Connell is married to sculptor Betsy Odom.
