= Taj Forer =

American entrepreneur and visual artist

Taj Forer (born 1981) is an American entrepreneur and visual artist. He is co-founder of Fabl, the B2B visual storytelling platform (SaaS), and Daylight, an art media publisher.

Born in New Jersey, Forer studied at Sarah Lawrence College and the University of North Carolina, Chapel Hill. He is the author of two books, Threefold Sun, (2007, Edizioni Charta; Milan, Italy) and "Stone by Stone," (2011, Kehrer; Heidelberg, Germany)
