= Alinka Echeverría =

Mexican-British artist and visual anthropologist (born 1981)

Alinka Echeverría (born 1981) is a Mexican-British visual anthropologist, artist, filmmaker, and broadcaster.

She is best known for her work, The Road to Tepeyac, which won the HSBC Prix Pour La Photographie in France in 2011 and has since been exhibited over 33 times.

== Early life and education ==
Alinka Echeverría was born in 1981 in Mexico City, Mexico. She was trained as an anthropologist and earned her master's degree in Social Anthropology from the University of Edinburgh in 2004, with an exchange year at the University of Bologna in Italy. Echeverría then worked on HIV prevention NGO projects in East Africa for several years. She studied photography at the International Center for Photography in New York and graduated with a postgraduate degree in 2008. From 2010 to 2011, she was artist-in-residence at L'École Nationale Supérieure de la Photographie in Arles, France.

== Life and work ==
In an interview with Kate Tiernan, she recognized that the migration of her family to northern England has had an impact on her works regarding themes of separation and union in relation to social and political struggles.

Echeverría hosted a BBC documentary The Art that Made Mexico: Paradise, Power and Prayers in 2017.

=== The Road to Tepeyac (2010) ===
The Road to Tepeyac depicts portraits of Mexican Catholic pilgrims from their back, who were on their way to the church of the Virgin of Guadalupe. This series of work, in Echeverría's words, is a "photographic typology." Through the icons of the Virgin of Guadalupe that was carried on the back of the pilgrims, the artist aimed to observe the visual representations of the Virgin of Guadalupe in contemporary Mexico.

=== Becoming South Sudan (2011) ===
This portrait series sought to capture the gazes of individual South Sudanese at the time of the independence of South Sudan, following decades of war, in 2011. Exploring the becoming and self-determination of individual South Sudanese, this portrait series addresses the powerful representation of these individuals. Echeverría was also interested in investigating the meaning of South Sudan becoming an independent nation for its unification of sixty-nine tribes at the time. She sees this series of works as a collaborative project, in which South Sudanese teenagers would stand in front of her camera and she would expose them to the world. Being photographed a few weeks before the independence of South Sudan, this project captures various South Sudanese across social classes, including refugees to police forces. Echeverría was also interested in the birth of a nation and its transformation from social anomy to civil society, as well as the creation of state institutions.

=== Nicephora (2015–present) ===
In 2015, She started the research-based project Nicephora during the BMW photographer-in-residency at the musée Nicéphore Niépce. This project incorporates various media including collage, sculpture, three-dimensional rendering, sound installation, photography etc. In this project, Echeverría sought to deconstruct how the representations of women have long been constructed by the male gaze in male-dominated practices of early photography. This project stemmed from the photographic archives of Nicéphore Niépce Museum in France, a museum that centers the photography of Nicéphore Niépce, who was the inventor of photography. Echeverría's interest lies in the origins of photography as a medium and Nicéphore Nièpce's obsession with infinitely reproducible images. She appropriated and feminized the photographer's name symbolically as the title of this project. Echeverría's intention was thus to problematize the colonial and male gaze and practices of capturing, reproducing and disseminating images of females in French North Africa at the time. She views such practices to be inherent in photography since the invention of the medium. She scanned approximately four hundred images from the archive, particularly images of females. This project is also Echeverría's exploration of her Latin feminine contemporary perspective.

To Echeverría, this project is a fieldwork, in which the field is the basement of the museum. As an anthropologist and photographic artist, she interrogates and deconstructs how these images ungird colonial and male gaze, seeking a contemporary overturn of these inherently biased practices. The other research objective of this project is to investigate how viewers are conditioned to read these images and how photographers are conditioned to construct them. While the practice of othering females remains to be the code of seeing until this day, Echeverría reframed and rendered these images using techniques such as collage to scrutinize how the purpose of these images can be changed, regarding their contexts and materiality.

Nicephora was later exhibited in a solo exhibition titled ´Simulacra’ at the Montréal Museum of Fine Arts (MBAM, Musée des beaux-arts de Montréal) in 2019.

== Awards ==
- 2020: MAST Foundation overall exhibition prize for work 'Apparent Femininity', commissioned by the Foundation. The exhibition was curated the Urs Stahel.
- 2019: Selected Grantee for the MAST Foundation Grant for Industry and Photography.
- 2017–2020: nominee of Prix Elysée 2017–2020, The Musée de l'Elysée prize for supporting mid-career photography artists.
- 2017: Selected Artist for the Foam Museum Talent Award.
- 2016: Finalist in the Aesthetica Art Award.
- 2016: Artist Commission for the Swiss Foundation for Photography.
- 2015: Selected Artist-in-Residence for BMW Art & Culture.
- 2015: Selected Nominee for the FT/OppenheimerFunds Emerging Voices Awards.
- 2014: given an International Development Fund from the British Council/Arts Council England
- 2014: Fellowship Award for the Kala Art Institute.
- 2013: Nominee for the Foam Paul Huf Award.
- 2013: Finalist in the Terry O’Neill Award.
- 2013: selected as a Nominee for the Prix Pictet.
- 2010–2013: UK Winner of the Magenta Foundation Flash Forward.
- 2012: Echeverría was honoured under the Lucie Awards category International Photography Awards as International Photographer of The Year.
- 2012: selected as a Nominee for the Prix Pictet.
- 2011: Finalist in the Magnum Expression Award.
- 2011: Selected Artist for the National Portrait Gallery Taylor Wessing Prize.
- 2011: HSBC Prize For Photography (Prix HSBC Pour La Photographie) in France.
- 2011: Selected Participant in the Joop Swart Masterclass.
- 2011: Finalist in the Encontros da Imagem Braga Photography Award.
- 2010: Finalist in the FotoVisura Grant.
- 2010: Award Winner for the Center Santa Fe Choice Awards.

== Exhibitions ==
- 2020: Heroine, Light Work, Kathleen O. Ellis Gallery This recent exhibition centers on her project Nicephora (2015–present). By naming the exhibition Heroine, she intends to stress that the heroines of past, present and future are always the women as mothers, gatherers, community leaders, caregivers, inventors, artists and archaeologists.
- 2019: Simulacra: Alinka Echeverría, Montréal Museum of Fine Arts
- 2018: Mexican Cultural Institute, Berlin
- 2018: Preus Museum: National Museum of Photography, Norway
- 2017: Mexican Cultural Institute, Paris, France
- 2016: Becoming South Sudan, The Ravestijn Gallery, Amsterdam
- 2016: Nicephora R Espace BMW Art & Culture, Paris Photo Grand Palais
- 2016: Les Rencontres de la Photographie, Arles, France
- 2015: South Searching, Gazelli Art House
- 2015: Johannesburg Art Gallery, South Africa
- 2015: Casa de Africa, Havana, Cuba
- 2014: The California Museum of Photography, USA
- 2012: Manezh Exhibition Hall, Moscow Photobiennale, Russia
- 2012: French Institute of Latin America, Mexico City, Mexico
- 2011: Maison de la Photographie, Lille, France
- 2011: L’Arsenale, Metz, France
- 2011: Bibliothèque Nationale de France François Mitterrand, Paris, France
- 2008: International Center of Photography, New York, USA
