= Tim Davis (artist) =

American visual artist and poet

Tim Davis (born 1969) is an American visual artist and poet, based in New York City and Tivoli, New York. He is the author and subject of several books of photography, plus a book of poetry. He was awarded the Rome Prize in 2007.

== Life and work ==
Davis was born in Malawi. He graduated from Bard College and earned a Masters of Fine Arts degree from Yale University.

Davis' first body of work, “Office Series,” was made in the offices of the small publishing firm where he worked as an editor. It was exhibited at the Museum of Modern Art, New York, and at the Museum of the City of New York, and published in Blindspot Magazine.

While attending Yale University's MFA Program in Photography, he began a series of pictures of typical American houses, each with the sign from an adjacent multinational corporation reflected in its windows. These works, called Retail, have been shown internationally, at WhiteCube Gallery in London, Galerie Rodolphe Janssen in Brussels, Sikkema Jenkins in New York, at the Rencontres d'Arles, where he was nominated for the Prix Découverte, also at Art and Architecture, 1900–2000, at the Palazzo Ducale in Genoa, Italy, and most recently in The Irresistible Force at the Tate Modern in London. These works are now in the collections of the Whitney, the Guggenheim, the Milwaukee Art Museum, the Fotomuseum Winterthur, and the Citibank Collection. A monograph, Lots, was published by Coromandel Express in Paris reprising this work.

Davis continued this work by photographing in museums around the world. Permanent Collection consists of photographs of paintings, made from oblique angles so that light from the museum itself reflects off the canvases, altering their ostensible meanings. The work was exhibited in solo shows at Sikkema Jenkins, Rodolphe Janssen, Jackson Fine Art in Atlanta, and the Kevin Bruk Gallery in Miami. The series has entered the collection of the Metropolitan, Hirshhorn, Fogg, Walker, Brooklyn, and High Museums, and a monograph was published by Nazraeli Press, with an essay by Walead Beshty.

In 2004 MY Life in Politics opened at the Bohen Foundation in New York photographing this country's political surfaces and spaces, searching for evidence of what the political life of an average American looks like. Aperture published a monograph of this work in 2006.

Davis then exhibited (Ill)illuminations, a series of photographs describing misuses, ill-conceptions and overstatements of light. at Greenberg Van Doren Gallery in New York.

In 2007 he received the Joseph H. Hazen Rome Prize in Visual Art from the American Academy in Rome. The fellowship resulted in two bodies of work. The New Antiquity was exhibited at several galleries and published as a book by Damiani Editore. with an essay by Francine Prose. In Art in America, Jean Dykstra wrote, " Davis has an acute eye for the odd detail, his work is leavened by a sense of delight in the strangeness of the world. " Artnet commented, " Seldom do we find an artist conveying as much sheer, offhanded fun as Davis"

Davis then began a period of working in sound and video. In The Upstate New York Olympics, the artist created fifty new sports, in which he is the only participant. He filmed himself finding these new sports throughout the entire state of New York, in all four seasons. The work has been exhibited internationally and was published as a book by the Dorsky Museum at SUNY New Paltz, NY.

A grant from Bard College helped Davis write and produce a vinyl album of songs called It's OK to Hate Yourself, a collaboration with this brother, Benjamin Lazar Davis. He made videos for each song.

Davis has made many commissioned projects, including Il Technogiro dell' Ornitorinco, about the high speed train line between Bologna and Milan, made for Linea de Confine, and published as a book with an essay by William Guerrieri. The Transformer Station, in Cleveland commissioned a large video installation called Transit Byzantium, consisting of tracking shots of people walking all over the city.

The MACRO museum in Rome then commissioned a large-scale show called Quinto Quarto, consisting of collections of images of graffiti penises, graffiti swastikas and La La Boheme, a video of non-Italian sex workers singing songs in their native languages. It was published as a catalog by Punctum Press.

A second large museum show, at the Tang Teaching Museum in Saratoga Springs, NY followed, called When We Are Dancing (I Get Ideas). This show included some photographs, but centered around video projections and interactive sculptural installations, such as The Library of Ideas, a large bookshelf of books with the word "ideas" in the title, and UNEZ listening, a room full of easy listening LPs, which viewers could place on three turntables simultaneously. The catalog of this show features essays by its curator, Rachel Seligman, and by acclaimed essayist, Lucy Sante.

Aperture published Davis' largest-scale photographic book to date, in 2021. Called I'm Looking Through You, it is a 255 page investigation into the glamorous surface of southern California.

In 2022 the Fondazione di Sardegna commissioned Davis to travel to Sardinia to make a new body of work. The book, Hallucinations, was published by Punctum Press.

== Publications ==
=== Photography ===
- Seduire/Seduce, exhibition catalogue, Coromandel Express, Paris, 2002.
- American Standard, exhibition catalogue, Barbara Gladstone Gallery, New York, 2002.
- Lots, Tim Davis, monograph, essay by David Levi-Strauss, Coromandel Design, Paris, 2002.
- American Whatever, book of poetry by Tim Davis, Edge Books, 2004.
- Permanent Collection, monograph, Nazraeli, 2005.
- My Life in Politics, monograph, Aperture, 2006.
- Vitamin Ph: New Perspectives in Photography, Phaidon, 2006.
- America: Three Hundred Years of Innovation, exhibition catalogue, Shanghai Museum of Art, Shanghai, 2007.
- K/R: Projects, Writings/Buildings, photo essay by Tim Davis, Ten Thousand One, 2007.
- To: Night (Contemporary Representations of the Night), exhibition catalogue, The Hunter College Art Galleries, New York, 2008.
- States of Mind: Young American Photography, exhibition catalogue, TH-Inside, Brussels and Copenhagen, 2008.
- Kings of Cyan, exhibition catalog, Take 5 Editions, Geneva, 2008.
- The New Antiquity, monograph, Damiani Editore, 2009.
- Il Technologiro dell' Ornitorinco, monograph, Linea di Confine, Italy, 2010
- Quinto Quarto. Monograph, Punctum. 2011
- Effects That Aren't Special, exhibition catalog. Opalka Gallery, Sage Colleges, 2018.
- When We Are Dancing (I Get Ideas), large exhibition catalog. Tang Teaching Museum. 2020
- I'm Looking Through You, large monograph from Aperture Foundation, 2021
- Hallucinations, Monograph from Punctum Press, 2022.

=== Poetry ===
- American Whatever. Edge, 2004. ISBN 978-1890311179.

== Exhibitions ==
- Outpost: photographs by Tim Davis, John Lehr and Michael Vahrenwald, Susanne Hilberry Gallery, Ferndale, MI, 2007
- Tim Davis, The Upstate New York Olympics, Multimedia Art Museum, Moscow, 2012
- Heavy Rotation, Franklin Street Works, 2012

== Awards ==
- 2007: Rome Prize from the American Academy in Rome
