= Photo Élysée =

Museum of photography in Switzerland

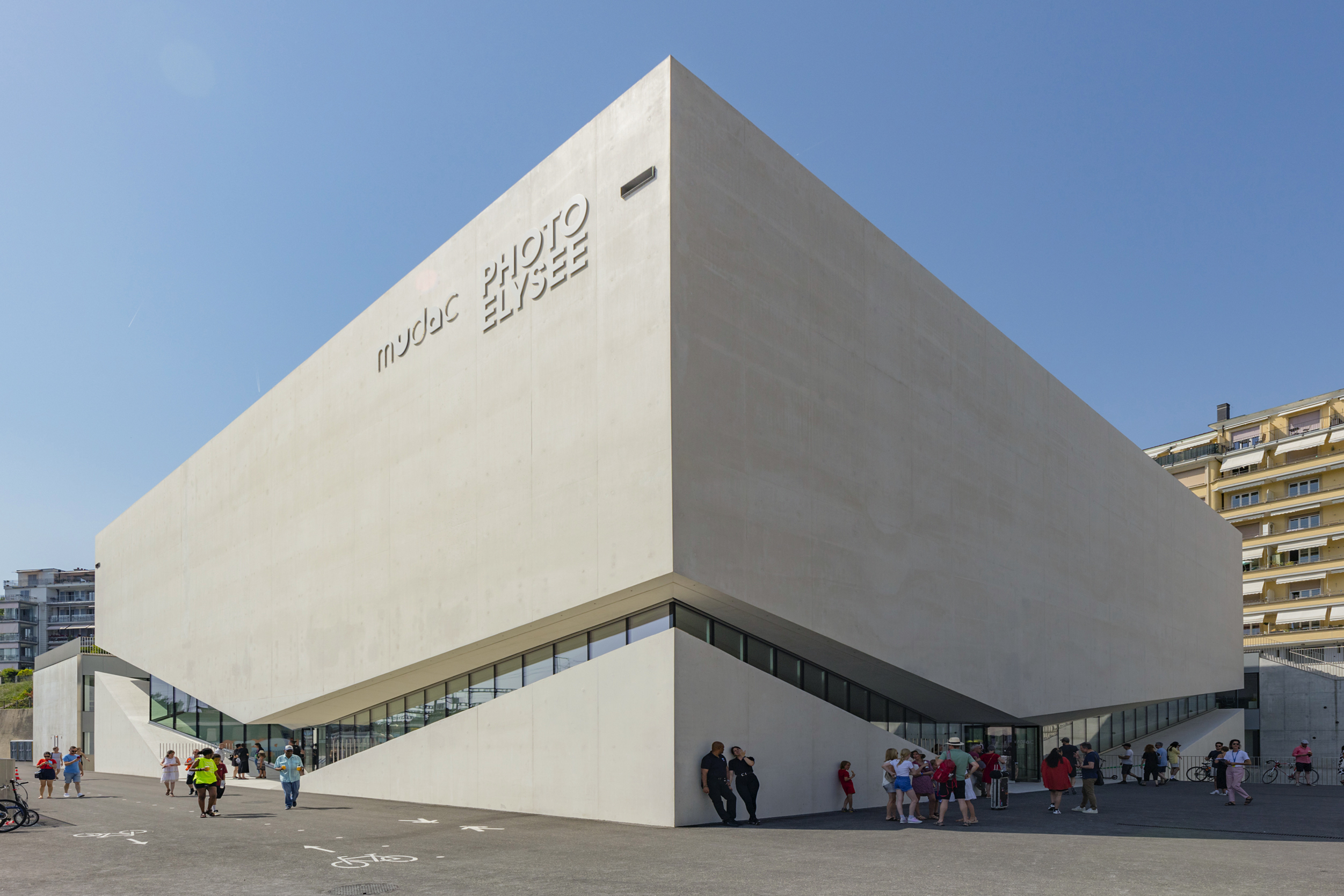
- Photo Élysée building
- Established: 1985
- Location: 18, avenue de l'Élysée, 1014 Lausanne, Switzerland
- Coordinates: 46.5098°N 6.6328°E
- Type: Photography
- Director: Nathalie Herschdorfer
- Website: www.elysee.ch

Photo Élysée, formerly known as Musée de l'Élysée, is a museum in Lausanne, Switzerland, entirely devoted to photography. It is a government-supported institution founded in 1985 by Charles-Henri Favrod. It was housed in an 18th-century mansion until October 2020.

The museum was temporarily closed from October 2020 until June 2022, as it was moving to a new building. The new building is designed by Portuguese architects Aires Mateus. It is housed with two other museums in the [[Plateforme 10]10]] Arts District; the Cantonal Museum of Fine Arts and the Museum of Contemporary Design and Applied Arts.

== Direction ==
- 1985–1994 : Charles-Henri Favrod
- 1995–2009 : William A. Ewing
- 2010–2014 : Sam Stourdzé
- 2015–2021 : Tatyana Franck
- 2022 : Nathalie Herschdorfer

Succeeding Tatyana Franck, Nathalie Herschdorfer has been in charge since June 2022.

== Collection ==
The collection of more than 100,000 photographs covers the whole range of photographic history and technology from 19th century daguerreotypes to contemporary digital prints. Amongst others, it holds collections of works by Adolphe Braun, who worked at the court of Napoleon III, Gabriel Lippmann, Mario Giacomelli, Lucia Moholy, Gilles Caron and Pieter Hugo.

The entire collections of Ella Maillart and Nicolas Bouvier were bequeathed to the museum. In 2011 it acquired Charlie Chaplin's collection of around 10,000 photographs. The museum also holds the collection of Pierre Gilliard, tutor to the children of Emperor Nicholas II of Russia.

== Exhibitions ==
In 2025, Photo Élysée presented an exhibition examining the archives of the Lehnert & Landrock studio, which entered the museum’s collection in 1985. The exhibition focused on early 20th-century photographs taken in North Africa and examined how these images reflected Orientalist views. In the same year, the museum also hosted Gen Z. Ein neuer Blick, a photography exhibition featuring work by young artists from around the world that focused on self-representation.

== Distinction ==
- 2016: Lucies Awards, Spotlight Award

== Events ==
=== The Nuit des Images ===
Photo Elysée organizes the Nuit des Images at the end of June, which was held in the museum gardens until 2020.

=== Prix Elysée ===
Photo Elysée has been awarding the Prix Elysée since 2014.

==== Winners ====
- 2015: Martin Kollár, Provisional Arrangement
- 2017: Matthias Bruggmann, A haunted World where it never shows
- 2019: Luis Carlos Tovar, My Father's Garden
- 2021: Kurt Tong, Dear Franklin
- 2023: Debi Cornwall, Model citizens
- 2025 : Hannah Darabi, Why Don't You Dance?

== See also ==
- List of museums in Switzerland
