= Museum of Contemporary Photography =

Museum in Chicago, Illinois

The Museum of Contemporary Photography
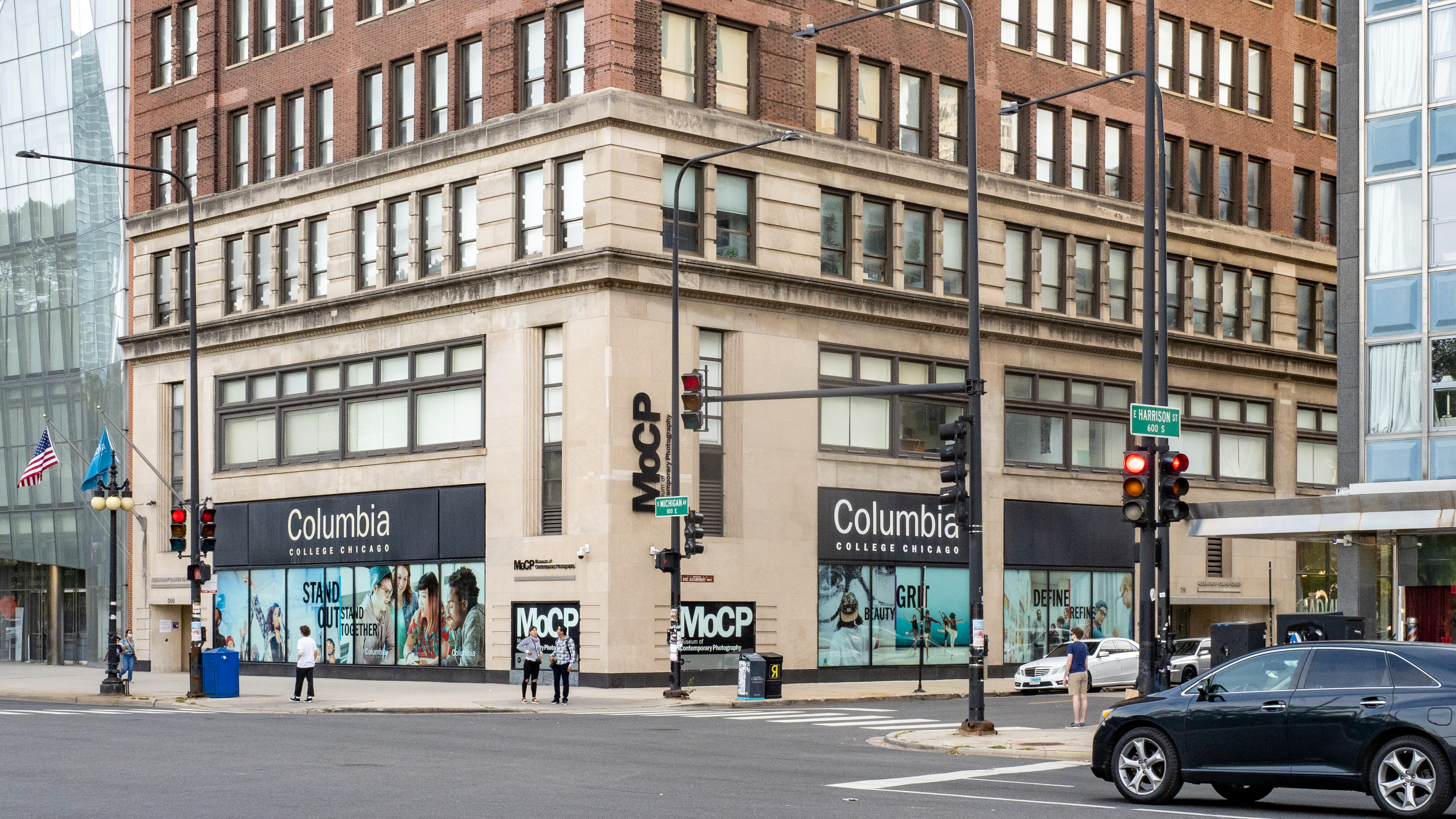
- Viewed from Michigan Avenue
- Established: 1976
- Location: 600 South Michigan Avenue, Near South Side, Chicago, Illinois
- Coordinates: 41.869538°N 87.625597°W
- Type: Photography
- Website: www.mocp.org

The Museum of Contemporary Photography (MoCP) was founded in 1976 by Columbia College Chicago as the successor to the Chicago Center for Contemporary Photography. The museum houses a permanent collection as well as the Midwest Photographers Project (MPP), which contains portfolios of photographers and artists' work who reside in the Midwestern United States. The Museum of Contemporary Photography began collecting in the early 1980s and has since grown its collection to include more than 15,000 objects by over 1,500 artists. The MoCP is accredited by the American Alliance of Museums.

== History ==
MoCP's initial permanent collection was defined as "contemporary", including works by American photographers since the 1950s. In the early 2000s, the date was pushed back to include the Farm Security Administration works of the 1930s and works by international artists.

== Permanent collection ==
The MoCP's permanent collection includes work by Ansel Adams, Harry Callahan, Henri Cartier-Bresson, Julia Margaret Cameron, Walker Evans, Dorothea Lange, Irving Penn, David Plowden, Aaron Siskind, and Victor Skrebneski among the 15,000-plus photographs and photographic objects, including gelatin-silver prints, color work, digital pieces, photograms, and various alternative processes.

== Selected exhibitions ==
Notable exhibitions have included:

- Paul Shambroom: Evidence of Democracy, October–December 2003
- Michael Wolf: The Transparent City and Work/Place, November 2008 – January 2009
- Guy Tillim: Avenue Patrice Lumumba, January–March 2011
- If Emmett Till Lived: Freedom on American Ground - September-December 2026 - featuring commentary from Rev. Wheeler Parker Jr., cousin and witness to the kidnapping of Emmett Till, in honor of Till's would-be 85th birthday.
