= Tatyana Franck =

Museum director

Tatyana Franck (born in Geneva on 12 May 1984) is a museum director and nonprofit executive. She was the director of the Photo Élysée museum in Lausanne from 2015 to 2022. She is the current president of the French Institute Alliance Française in New York.

== Early life and education ==
Between the ages of 8 and 12, Franck attended a school for circus performers. When she was 17, she worked for the art printing house Idem.

In 2006, Franck obtained a double degree in Art History and Law from the Sorbonne University in Paris. In 2007, she obtained a master's degree in Business Law and in 2008 a degree in Art Market Law from the University of Lyon. She also received an EMBA-Global Asia from Columbia Business School, London Business School and the University of Hong Kong in 2016.

== Career ==
Franck is a former alpine skier. training in Val d'Isère under the guidance of former Olympic champion Patrice Bianchi. She participated in several French, European, and World Championships in the "minime" (12–15 years) and "benjamin" categories and received the award for best skier in Île-de-France in 1996 from Paris mayor Bertrand Delanoë. She retired from competition following a torn cruciate ligament.

She interned at Christie's, worked for an art investment fund in London, and at Picasso Administration.

Between 2006 and 2015, she directed the Claude Picasso archives in Paris and Geneva. In particular, she curated the exhibition "Picasso at Work", "Through the Lens of David Douglas Duncan," which was exhibited in Malaga, Roubaix, and Geneva. She also directed a Picasso exhibition at the Bellas Artes in Mexico City.

In March 2015, Franck was named director of the Lausanne Museum of Photography (Musée de l'Élysée), now known as the Photo Elysée. During her tenure as president, she oversaw the construction of a new building to house the museum's collections at Plateforme 10 in Lausanne. In addition to overseeing its move and building the new museum, she has expanded its collections and strengthened its international influence through the development of digital initiatives. She also relaunched the photography magazine ELSE and began allowing donations of artist's entire archives rather than just deposits. As director of the museum, she accepted the Spotlight Award for the Musée de l'Élysée at the Lucie Awards held at Carnegie Hall in New York in 2016.

In March 2022, Franck left the Musée de l'Élysée and was appointed President of the French Institute Alliance Française in New York. At the time of her appointment, she was the youngest ever president of the FIAF.

In the same year, Franck received Chevalier de l’Ordre des Arts et des Lettres honors from the Minister of Culture in France.

== Personal life ==
Franck is the niece of French photographer Henri Cartier-Bresson and Belgian photographer Martine Franck and the daughter of gallery owner Eric Franck. She has four brothers.

== Selected publications ==
- Franck, Tatyana; Martin, Pauline; Gilman, Sondra; Gonzalez-Falla, Celso, eds. (2018). The beauty of lines : the Gilman and Gonzalez-Falla collection. Lausanne. ISBN 978-3-85881-800-3. OCLC 1006461384.
- Franck, Tatyana; Dorner, Lydia, eds. (2021). Prix Elysée : livre des nominés 2020-2022 = The nominees' book 2020-2022. Zürich. ISBN 978-3-03942-013-1. OCLC 1244801646.
