= Rosalind Fox Solomon =

American photographer (1930–2025)

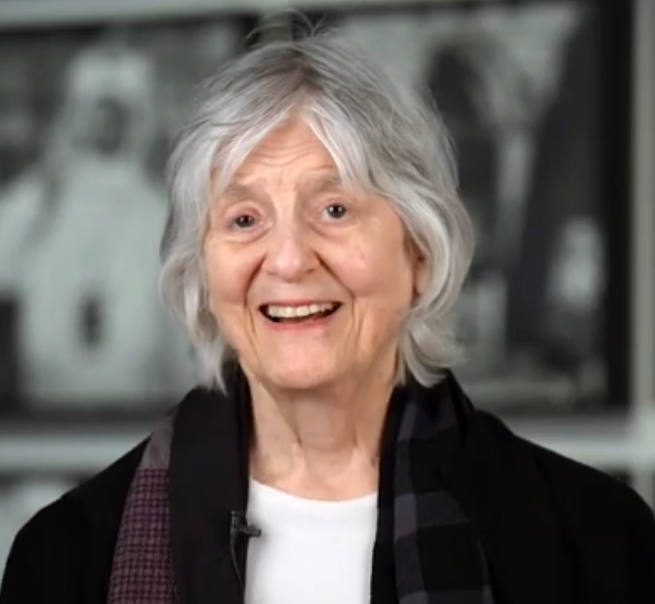
- In a Brooklyn Museum video in 2016
- Born: Rosalind Fox; April 2, 1930; Highland Park, Illinois, U.S.
- Died: June 23, 2025 (aged 95); New York City, U.S.
- Education: Goucher College
- Known for: Photography
- Spouse: Jay Solomon (div. 1984)
- Children: Linda Solomon Wood and Joel Solomon, Jr.
- Awards: Lifetime Achievement – Infinity Award, International Center of Photography; 2019
- Website: www.rosalindfoxsolomon.com

Rosalind Fox Solomon (April 2, 1930 – June 23, 2025) was an American photographer based in New York City.

In 2007, the University of Arizona's Center for Creative Photography acquired Solomon's archive, which includes her photographic archive, books and video work. In 2019, she received the International Center of Photography's Lifetime Achievement Infinity Award. Her work is held in the collections of the Center for Creative Photography, Museum of Modern Art, Bibliothèque nationale de France, Victoria and Albert Museum, and Die Photographische Sammlung/SK Stiftung Kultur.

== Early life and education ==
Solomon was born on April 2, 1930, in Highland Park, Illinois. She graduated from Highland Park High School in 1947. She attended Goucher College in Baltimore, Maryland graduating with a Bachelor of Arts in Political Science in 1951.

== Before photography ==
Later Solomon became the Southern Regional Director of the Experiment in International Living. In this capacity, she visited communities throughout the Southern United States, recruiting families to host international guests and interact with other cultures in a personal way.

In August 1963, Solomon traveled to Washington, D.C. for an interview with the Equal Employment Department of the United States Agency for International Development (USAID), which was then establishing a program for part-time recruiter–consultants in various regions of the United States. Solomon and a group of USAID staff including Roger Wilkins (nephew of Roy Wilkins) joined the March on Washington for Jobs and Freedom, during which Martin Luther King Jr. delivered his famous "I Have a Dream" speech. Subsequently, in her work for USAID, Solomon traveled to historically black colleges in Alabama, Georgia, Mississippi, and Tennessee where she spoke to students and faculty about overseas employment opportunities.

== Photography ==
In 1968, Solomon's volunteer work with the Experiment in International Living brought her to Japan where she stayed with a family near Tokyo. There, at age 38, Solomon began to use an Instamatic camera to communicate her feelings and thoughts. This was the starting point for her photography practice, which also includes prose related to her life experiences.

Upon her return to the United States, Solomon photographed regularly. She purchased a Nikkormat in 1969 and in the garden shed she processed 35 mm black and white film and printed her first pictures. In 1971, she began intermittent studies with Lisette Model during visits to New York City (which continued until 1977). By 1974, she was using a medium format camera. Dolls, children, and manikins were some of her first subjects, along with portraits and rituals. She worked with black and white film exclusively.

In 1975, Solomon began photographing at the Baroness Erlanger Hospital in Chattanooga, Tennessee. She photographed people recovering from operations, wounds, and illness. In early 1977, Solomon photographed William Eggleston, his family and friends in Tennessee and Mississippi. She moved to Washington where she photographed artists and politicians for the series "Outside the White House" in 1977 and 1978. In 1978 and 1979, she also photographed in the Guatemalan Highlands. Her interest in how people cope with adversity, led her to witness a shaman's rites and a funeral and made photographs in Easter processions.

In 1980, Solomon began her work in Ancash, Peru where she returned intermittently for over 20 years. She made photographs in cemeteries where damage from the 1970 Ancash earthquake was still apparent. She continued photographing shamans, cemeteries, funerals and other rituals. She also photographed people of a subsistence economy surviving the extremes of life through Catholic, Evangelist, and Indigenous rites.

With a fellowship from the American Institute of Indian Studies, in 1981 Solomon began photographing festival rites in India. She found an expression of female energy and power in the forms of the goddess figures created in the sculptors' communities of Kolkata (Calcutta). In 1982 and 1983, she continued this work. While there, she photographed artists, including the painter, Ganesh Pyne and the filmmaker, Satyagit Ray. She also made portraits of the Dalai Lama and photographed Prime Minister Indira Gandhi.

In 1987 and 1988, Solomon photographed people with AIDS alone, with their families, and with their lovers. The project resulted in the exhibition, Portraits in the Time of AIDS at the Grey Gallery of Art of New York University in 1988.

In 1988, with concerns about the rise of ethnic violence in the world, she made her first trip to Poland. In 2003, she returned to work again in Poland. Also in 1988, Solomon's interest in race relations and ethnic violence, took her to Northern Ireland, Zimbabwe and South Africa. She continued the project in 1989 and 1990 in Northern Ireland and South Africa. In the 1990s, she visited hospitals in Yugoslavia and rehabilitation centers for victims of mines in Cambodia, and photographed victims of the American/Vietnam War near Hanoi.

Solomon photographed in Israel and the West Bank for five months during 2010 and 2011, part of This Place. She made portraits of people in Israel and the West Bank. She was photographing Palestinians in Jenin, and happened to be only a few minutes away when Israeli–Palestinian actor and director of The Freedom Theatre, Juliano Mer-Khamis, was gunned down in April 2011.

== Personal life and death ==
Solomon sailed to Belgium and France with The Experiment in International Living, a graduation present from her parents. She married Joel W. (Jay) Solomon (1921–1984), with whom she had two children, Joel and Linda. The marriage ended in divorce in 1984, her former husband died a few months later.

Fox Solomon died in New York City on June 23, 2025, at the age of 95.

== Publications ==
=== Books, catalogues, etc of Solomon's photography ===
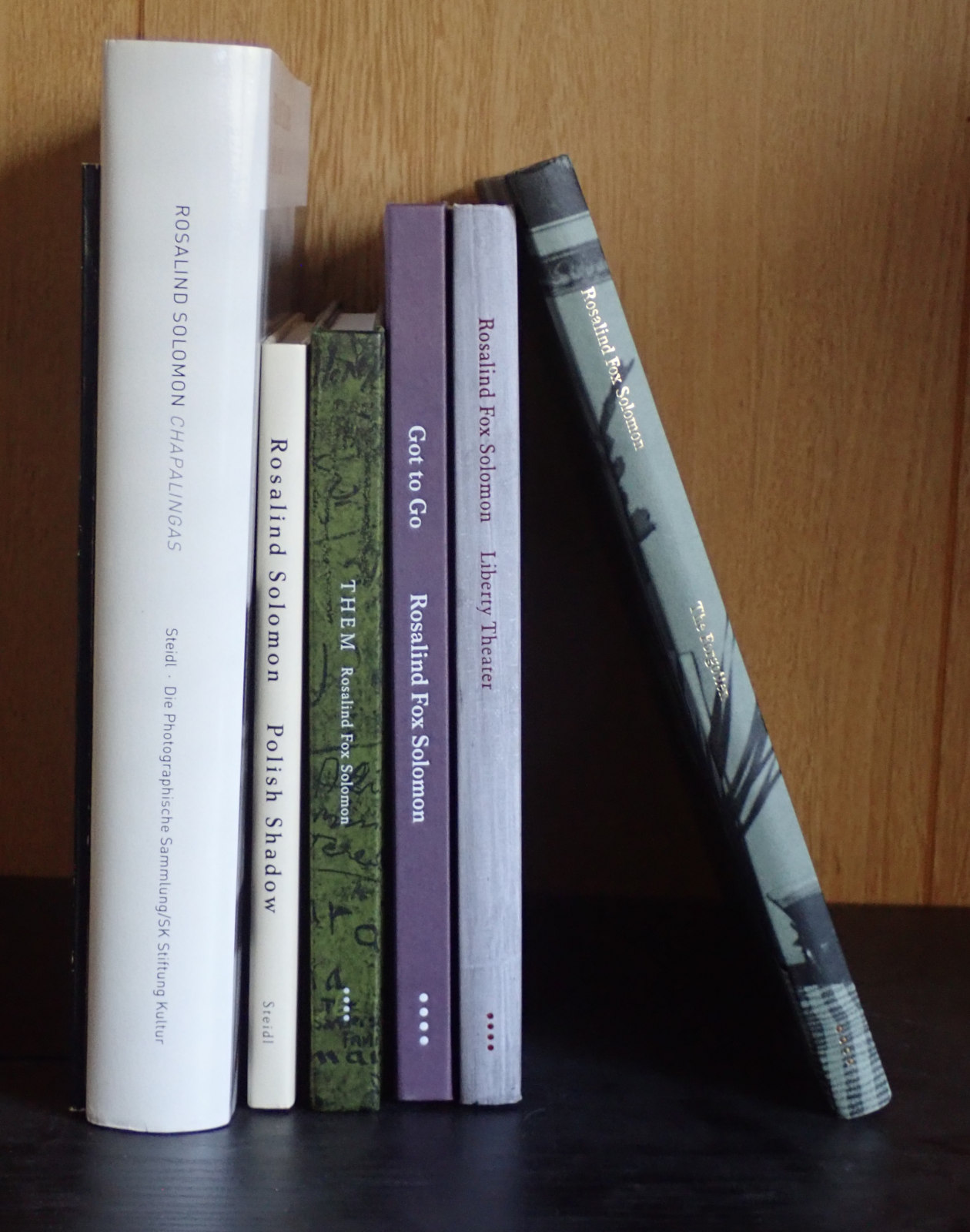
Some photobooks and catalogues by Solomon. (The slim black paperback at the far left is El Perú y Otros Lugares.)

- Union Depot: Photographed 1971–1973. Rosalind Solomon, 1973. Portfolio of 22 photographs. Edition of 100. OCLC 665159920
- Rosalind Solomon, Washington: May 15 – June 29, 1980. Washington, DC: Corcoran Gallery, 1980. Twenty-page exhibition catalogue, text by Jane Livingston. OCLC 6603279
- Rosalind Solomon: Venezia, 13. VII – 14. VIII. 1982. Venice: Ikona Photo Gallery, 1982. Eighteen-page exhibition catalogue, ed. Živa Kraus, text by Ljerka Mifka. OCLC 45754749
- Rosalind Solomon: India: An exhibition of photographs. New Delhi: M. Pistor for the United States Information Service, 1983. Sixteen-page exhibition catalogue, text by Will Stapp. OCLC 37799484
- Rosalind Solomon. Earthrites: Photographs from inside the Third World. San Diego, CA: Museum of Photographic Arts, 1986. Twelve-page exhibition catalogue, text by Arthur Ollman. OCLC 864687499
- Rosalind Solomon. Portraits in the Time of AIDS. New York: Grey Art Gallery & Studio Center, New York University, 1988. ISBN 0934349045. Exhibition catalogue, text by Thomas Sokolowski.
- Rosalind Solomon: Photographs, 1976–1987. Tucson, Arizona: Etherton Gallery, 1988. Thirty-two-page exhibition catalogue. With an essay by Arthur Ollman. OCLC 18130563
- Rosalind Solomon: El Perú y Otros Lugares = Peru and Other Places. Lima: Museo de Arte de Lima, 1996. Exhibition catalogue. With an introductory essay by Natalia Majluf and Jorge Villacorta; text in Spanish and English. OCLC 37465560
- Rosalind Solomon. Chapalingas. Göttingen: Steidl, 2003. ISBN 9783882438772. Photographs and texts by Solomon, catalogue essays by Susanne Lange, Ingrid Sischy and Gabriel Conrath-Scholl. Text in German, English and French. Published to accompany an exhibition at Die Photographische Sammlung/SK Stiftung Kultur, Cologne.
- Rosalind Solomon. Polish Shadow. Göttingen: Steidl, 2006. ISBN 9783865211996.
- Rosalind Fox Solomon. Them. London: Mack, 2014. ISBN 9781910164013.
- Rosalind Fox Solomon. Got to Go. London: Mack, 2016. ISBN 9781910164198.
- Rosalind Fox Solomon. Liberty Theater. London: Mack, 2018. ISBN 978-1-912339-22-8. With an essay, "The Play of Freedoms", by Stanley Wolukau-Wanambwa.
- Rosalind Fox Solomon. The Forgotten. London: Mack, 2021. ISBN 9781913620479.
- Rosalind Fox Solomon. A Woman I Once Knew. London: Mack, 2024. ISBN 9781915743404.

=== Recordings by Solomon ===
- Corazón: Songs and Music Recorded in Peru by Rosalind Solomon. Folkways Records FSS 34035, 1985. Recorded, produced and with photographs by Solomon. Reissued by Smithsonian Folkways. (Note: Described here in the Smithsonian Institution's website.)
- Indian Love Rites: Durga Puja and Kali Puja in Calcutta. Ethnic Folkways Records FE 4349, 1986. Recording produced by Solomon, and with photographs by her. The sounds of Durga Puja and Kali Puja. Reissued by Smithsonian Folkways. (Note: Described here in the Smithsonian Institution's website.)

=== Other publications ===
- John Szarkowski. Mirrors and Windows: American Photography Since 1960. Catalog of exhibition held at the Museum of Modern Art, 1978, and elsewhere, 1978–1980. ISBN 0870704753, ISBN 0870704761.
- Susan Kismaric. American Children: Photographs from the Collection of the Museum of Modern Art. New York: Museum of Modern Art, 1980. ISBN 0870702327, ISBN 0870702297.
- Keith F Davis, ed. Wanderlust: Work by eight contemporary photographers from the Hallmark photographic collection. Kansas City, MO: Hallmark Cards. Distribution: Albuquerque, New Mexico: University of New Mexico Press, 1987. ISBN 0875296211.
- Susan Kismaric. American Politicians: Photographs from 1843 to 1993. New York: Museum of Modern Art, 1994. ISBN 9780870701573, ISBN 9780810961357, ISBN 9780870701580.
- Vincent Gerard and Cedric Laty. Eggleston on Film. 85 minutes. 2005
- Amerika: die soziale Landschaft 1940 bis 2006: Meisterwerke amerikanischer Fotografie = America: The social landscape from 1940 until 2006: Masterpieces of American photography. Bologna, Italy: Damiani; Vienna: Kunsthalle Wien, 2006. ISBN 9788889431689. Catalogue of an exhibition held at Kunsthalle Wien.
- Charlotte Cotton, ed. This Place. London: Mack, 2014. ISBN 9781910164136. Photographs of Israel and the West Bank by Frédéric Brenner, Wendy Ewald, Martin Kollar, Josef Koudelka, Jungjin Lee, Gilles Peress, Fazal Sheikh, Stephen Shore, Solomon, Thomas Struth, Jeff Wall and Nick Waplington.
- Gabriele Conrath-Scholl and Stephan Berg, eds. Mit anderen Augen. Das Porträt in der zeitgenössischen Fotografie = With Different Eyes: The Portrait in Contemporary Photography. Cologne: Snoeck, 2016. ISBN 978-3-86442-158-7. Catalogue of the 2016 exhibition.

== Exhibitions ==
=== Solo exhibitions ===
- 1972: University of Tennessee, Chattanooga, Union Depot.
- 1973: Neikrug Galleries, New York, Journey through India and Nepal.
- 1975: Birmingham Museum of Art, Birmingham, Alabama, First Mondays in Scottsboro.
- 1976: Neikrug Galleries, New York, Dolls and Manikins.
- 1977: National Women's Conference, Houston, Texas, Third World Women.
- 1978: Sander Gallery, Washington, D.C. and The Photographers' Gallery, London, Alabama Portraits.
- 1980: Sander Gallery, Washington, D.C., Selected Images.
- 1980: Corcoran Gallery of Art, Washington, D.C., Rosalind Solomon: Washington.
- 1981: University of Tennessee, Chattanooga, First Mondays in Scottsboro.
- 1982: George Eastman House, Rochester, New York, Rosalind Solomon: India, Marianne Fulton (tour included Smithsonian American Art Museum).
- 1982: Film in the Cities, Minneapolis, Minnesota Rosalind Solomon: Peru.
- 1982: Ikona Gallery, Venice, Italy, Rosalind Solomon: Peru.
- 1984: American Center, New Delhi, Rosalind Solomon: India.
- 1984: Kraushauer Gallery, Goucher College, Towson, Maryland, Rosalind Solomon Photography.
- 1984: Tisch School of the Arts, The Photo Gallery, New York University, Rosalind Solomon Photographs.
- 1985: National Museum of Natural History, photographs of Indian festivals.
- 1986: Museum of Photographic Arts, San Diego, California, Rosalind Solomon: Earth Rites.
- 1986: Museum of Modern Art, New York, Rosalind Solomon: Ritual, Photographs 1975–1985, Peter Galassi.
- 1986: Espace, Union des Banques, Paris, Rosalind Solomon Photographies, Ghislaines Richard-Vitton.
- 1986: Lieberman and Saul Gallery, New York, Rosalind Solomon.
- 1987: Catskill Center for Photography, Woodstock, New York, In a New Light.
- 1988: Museum voor Volkenkunde, Rotterdam, the Netherlands, Rosalind Solomon: Earthrites.
- 1988: Grey Art Gallery and Study Center, New York University, New York, Rosalind Solomon: Portraits in the Time of AIDS.
- 1988: Etherton Gallery, Tucson, Arizona, Rosalind Solomon: Ritual, Photographs 1976–1987.
- 1989: Winfisky Gallery, Salem, Massachusetts, Rosalind Solomon.
- 1990: Museum of Contemporary Photography, Chicago, Illinois, Rosalind Solomon: Rites and Ritual.
- 1990: Kathleen Ewing Gallery, Washington DC.
- 1991: PGI Photo Gallery International, Tokyo, Rosalind Solomon: Photographs.
- 1992: Instituto de Estudios Norteamericanos, Badalona and Bilbao Cultural Center, Bilbao, Spain, Rosalind Solomon: Disconnections.
- 1995: Port Washington Public Library, Port Washington, New York, Rosalind Solomon: Photographs.
- 1995: Beth Urdang Gallery, Boston, Massachusetts, Rosalind Solomon: Photographs.
- 1996: Museo de Arte de Lima, Lima, Peru, El Perú y Otros Lugares = Peru and Other Places. Curated by Natalia Majluf and Jorge Villacorta.
- 2003: Galerie Thomas Zander, Cologne, Germany, Eleven Portraits of Eggleston.
- 2003: Die Photographische Sammlung/SK Stiftung Kultur, Cologne, Germany, Chapalingas.
- 2005–2006: Musée Nicéphore Niépce, Chalon-sur-Saône, France, Chapalingas. Seventy prints.
- 2005: Willy-Brandt-Haus, Berlin, Close and Distant – Poland.
- 2006: Foley Gallery, New York, American Pictures from Chapalingas 1976–2000.
- 2008: Bruce Silverstein Gallery, New York, Inside Out. Self-portraits.
- 2010: Bruce Silverstein Gallery, New York, Ritual.
- 2013: Bruce Silverstein Gallery, New York, Portraits in the Time of AIDS, 1988.
- 2015: Paris Photo (presented by Bruce Silverstein gallery), Portraits in the Time of AIDS, 1988.
- 2016: Bruce Silverstein Gallery, New York, Got to Go. 25 prints and a ten-minute video.
- 2018: Stephen Bulger Gallery, Toronto, Liberty Theater.
- 2021: Foley Gallery, New York, The Forgotten.

=== Group exhibitions ===
- 1987: Burden Gallery, Aperture Foundation, New York, Mothers and Daughters. With Bruce Davidson, Joel Meyerowitz, Niki Berg, Danny Lyon, Kathleen Kenyon and Jill Freedman.
- 1996: Brooklyn Museum of Art, New York, Latin American Photography: A Spiritual Journey, curated by Barbara Milstein.
- 2002: Sepia International, New York, Dream Street. Prints by 50 photographers.
- 2006: MUSA Museum auf Abruf, Vienna, part of the European Month of Photography / Monat der Fotografie.
- 2006: Kunsthalle Wien, Vienna, Americans, part of the European Month of Photography / Monat der Fotografie. Photographs by Helen Levitt, Robert Frank, Lee Friedlander, Bruce Davidson, Gordon Parks, Burk Uzzle, Diane Arbus, Peter Hujar, Richard Avedon, Larry Clark, Rosalind Solomon, Ed Templeton, Ryan McGinley; curated by Peter Weiermair.
- 2006: Museum of Modern Art, New York, Person, People, and Place.
- 2006: Sepia International, New York, Sepia at Seven.
- 2006: Salle d’exposition du quai Antoine ler, Monaco, La Trajectoire de regard: Une exposition de photographies du XXe siècle.
- 2006: Photo Gallery International, Tokyo, American Photographers: Fine Prints.
- 2006: Rubin Museum of Art, New York, Holy Madness: Portraits of Tantric Siddhas.
- 2007: Lisette Model and Her Successors, Aperture Foundation, New York. An exhibition of 14 photographers.
- 2008: Lisette Model and Her Successors, Presentation House Gallery, North Vancouver.
- 2009: Lisette Model and Her Successors, Mt. Holyoke College Art Gallery, MA.
- 2010: Discoveries, Bruce Silverstein Gallery, New York.
- 2010: Museum of Modern Art, NY. The Original Copy: Photography of Sculpture, 1839 to Today.
- 2010: Museum of Modern Art, NY. Pictures by Women: A History of Modern Photography. Four prints.
- 2014–2015: DOX Centre for Contemporary Art, Prague. This Place. First of a series of exhibitions of This Place, by Frédéric Brenner, Wendy Ewald, Martin Kollar, Josef Koudelka, Jungjin Lee, Gilles Peress, Fazal Sheikh, Stephen Shore, Solomon, Thomas Struth, Jeff Wall, Nick Waplington.
- 2015: Tel Aviv Museum of Art. This Place.
- 2015: MoMA PS1, New York. Greater New York. 11 prints.
- 2015–2016: Norton Museum of Art, West Palm Beach, Florida. This Place.
- 2016: Die Photografische Sammlung/SK Stiftung Kultur, Cologne; Kunstmuseum Bonn. Mit anderen Augen. Das Porträt in der zeitgenössischen Fotografie = With Different Eyes: The Portrait in Contemporary Photography.
- 2016: Brooklyn Museum of Art, NY. This Place.

== Major collections ==
In 2007, the University of Arizona's Center for Creative Photography acquired Solomon's archive, which includes her photographic archive, books and video work.

- Center for Creative Photography, University of Arizona, Tucson, Arizona.
- Museum of Modern Art. "57 works online".
- Bibliothèque nationale de France, Paris. Over 90 prints.
- Victoria and Albert Museum, London. 27 prints.
- Die Photographische Sammlung/SK Stiftung Kultur. About 50 works.

== Awards ==
- 1979: Guggenheim Fellowship
- 1989: National Endowment for the Arts fellowship
- 1980s: Grants from the American Institute of Indian Studies
- 2011: Honorary degree from Goucher College
- 2016: Lucie Award in Achievement in Portraiture category
- 2019: International Center of Photography Infinity Award: Lifetime Achievement
