= List of Korean photographers =

This is a list of Korean photographers.

== A ==
- Jun Ahn

== B ==
- Bae Bien-u (1950-)
- Chan-Hyo Bae (1975-)
- Bae Doona (1979-)

== H ==
- Han Youngsoo (1933-1998)
- Hyun Hyo-jae

== J ==
- Ina Jang (1982-)

== K ==
- Atta Kim (1956-)
- Kim Jung-man (1954-2022)
- Miru Kim (1981-)

== L ==
- Jungjin Lee (1961-)
- Nikki S. Lee (1970-)

== P ==
- Park Jongwoo (1958-)
- Park Jung-geun (1988-)
- Park Nohae (1957-)
- Soi Park

== S ==
- Min Chung Sik (1890-1977)

== Y ==
- Yoo Byung-eun (1941-2014)
