= Frédéric Brenner =

French photographer (born 1959)

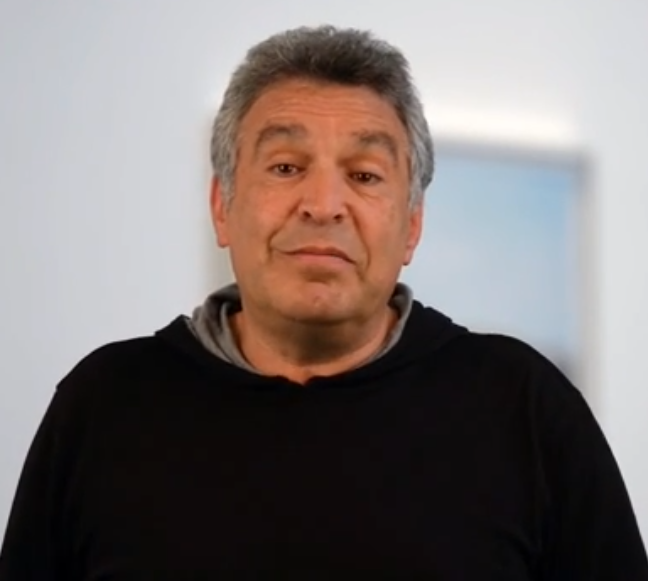
- In a Brooklyn Museum video in 2016
- Born: 1959 (age 66–67); Paris, France
- Known for: Photography
- Website: www.fredericbrenner.com

Frédéric Brenner (born 1959) is a French photographer known for his documentation of Jewish communities around the world. His work has been exhibited at the International Center of Photography in New York, the Musée de l'Élysée in Lausanne, Rencontres d'Arles in Arles, the Brooklyn Museum in New York, and the Joods Historisch Museum in Amsterdam.

In 1996, Brenner created an installation on Ellis Island, in New York, featuring several prominent Jewish Americans, including Lauren Bacall, Justice Ruth Bader Ginsburg, Mark Spitz and Mayor Ed Koch among others. The installation, and events leading up to it, was filmed by the documentary director Kevin Weyl.

== Early life and education ==
Brenner was born in Paris and grew up in France. In 1981, Brenner received a B.A. in French Literature and Social Anthropology from the Paris-Sorbonne University. He went on to study at the École des hautes études en sciences sociales and received a M.A. in Social Anthropology, also awarded by the Sorbonne.

Brenner is the recipient of the Niépce Prize and his book Diaspora: Homelands in Exile won the 2004 National Jewish Book Award in Visual Arts.

== Career ==
At age 19, Brenner began photographing Orthodox Jews in the Mea Shearim neighborhood of Jerusalem. Initially, he believed this was "authentic Judaism," but his approach quickly evolved into an exploration of the multiplicities of dissonant identities.

In 1981, Brenner began photographing Jewish communities around the world, exploring what it means to live and survive with a portable identity and how Jews adopted the traditions and manners of their home countries and yet remained part of the Jewish people. He spent 25 years chronicling the diaspora of the Jews across the world from Rome to New York, India to Yemen, Morocco to Ethiopia, Sarajevo to Samarkand. Brenner has published five books and directed three films. His work has been shown in museums and galleries around the world. He has been represented by Howard Greenberg Gallery in New York since 1990.

Brenner’s opus Diaspora: Homelands in Exile was published as a two-volume set of photographs and texts by HarperCollins in 2003 and appeared in four foreign editions. Diaspora was also a major exhibition, which opened in New York at the Brooklyn Museum in 2003 and traveled to nine other cities in America, Europe and Mexico. In reviewing the book, The New Yorker wrote: "Brenner's work—elegiac, celebratory, irreverent—transcends portraiture, representing instead a prolonged, open-ended inquiry into the nature of identity and heritage." NPR's Robert Siegel has described Brenner's work as "a celebration of the diversity and complexity of diaspora."

In 2006, Brenner founded This Place, a collective photography project aimed at recontextualizing Israel from multiple perspectives. The photographers working on this project include Wendy Ewald, Martin Kollar, Josef Koudelka, Jungjin Lee, Gilles Peress, Fazal Sheikh, Stephen Shore, Rosalind Solomon, Thomas Struth, Jeff Wall, and Nick Waplington. This Place will be exhibited internationally, beginning at the DOX Centre for Contemporary Art in Prague in the fall of 2014.

== Publications ==
- Jerusalem, Instants d'Eternité. Paris: Éditions Denoël, 1984.
- Israel. New York: HarperCollins; London: Collins Harville, 1988. With texts by A. B. Yehoshua
- Marranes. Paris: Editions de la Différence, 1992. With an essay by Y.H. Yerushalmi.
- Jews/America/A Representation. New York: Abrams Books, 1996. With an essay by Simon Schama.
- Exile at Home. New York: Abrams Books, 1998. With a poem by Yehuda Amichai.
- Diaspora: Homelands in Exile. New York: HarperCollins, 2003.
- An Archeology of Fear and Desire. London: Mack, 2014.

== Filmography ==
- 1991, Les derniers Marranes (The Last Marranos), with Stan Neumann, produced by Les Films d’Ici, distributed by Europe Images International.
- 2003, Tykocin, with Jérôme de Missolz, ZKO Films.
- 2003, Madres de Desaparecidos, ZKO Films.

== Exhibitions ==
- 1982 Musée Nicéphore-Niépce, Chalon-sur-Saône, France
- 1983 Consejo Mexicano de Photographias, Bellas Artes, Mexico City
- 1991 Joods Historisch Museum, Amsterdam
- 1992 International Center of Photography, New York
- 1990 Rencontres d'Arles, Arles
- 1993 Howard Greenberg Gallery, New York
- 1993 Musée de l'Elysée, Lausanne
- 1994 Rencontres d'Arles, Arles
- 1996 Howard Greenberg Gallery, New York
- 2003 Brooklyn Museum, New York
- 2004 United Nations, New York
- 2022 Joods Museum, Amsterdam
