= Sunmin Lee =

South Korean photographer (born 1968)

- Born: 1968 (age 57–58); Seoul, South Korea
- Education: Sungshin Women's University, Ewha Womans University, Chung-Ang University
- Known for: Photography
- Awards: Kangwon Documentary Photographer Award (2006), Songeun Art Award (2009), Richards’ Family Trust Award, Dong Gang International Photo Festival’s Now and New Exhibition Award.
- Website: sunminlee.com

Sunmin Lee (Korean: 이선민; born 1968) is a South Korean photographer whose work focuses on the role of women in South Korean society. Her photographs challenge the idealized representation of traditional Korean families and deal with various themes such as patriarchy, gendered domestic work, family hierarchies and migration.

== Biography ==
Sunmin Lee was born in 1968 in Seoul, South Korea. Initially encouraged by her family to pursue a career in education, she later realized that she wanted to dedicate her time to photography. At the beginning of her career, she approached this medium by working as a photographer for travel magazines.

=== Education ===
After completing a bachelor's degree in Chinese Literature at Seongshin Women's University in 1991, she received several undergraduate academic degrees, including a Bachelor of Arts in Music from Ewha Womans University, and a Bachelor of Arts in Photography from Chung-Ang University. She also received a Master of Fine Arts in Plastic Art and Photography (1997) from Chung-Ang University Graduate School of Photography in Seoul, Korea.

==== Awards and recognitions ====
Sunmin Lee has received multiple prizes throughout her career. In 2006 she received the Kangwon Documentary Photographer Award by the Kangwon province. Three years later, she was awarded the Songeun Art Award by the SongEun Art and Cultural Foundation. In 2019 she won a residency program at the Youngeun Museum of Contemporary Art and the Richards’ Family Trust Award at the Griffin Museum of Photography. She also won the Dong Gang International Photo Festival’s Now and New Exhibition award.

== Artwork ==
=== Woman's House I (1998 - 2004) ===
Sunmin Lee is known for her photographs that document the role of women in contemporary society and their lives inside and outside the traditional Korean nuclear family. One of her first photographic series, Woman's House I (1998 - 2004), depicts mothers in relation to their children in everyday scenes within the home environment. It differs greatly from traditional family portraits popular in South Korea since the 1960s, which typically present all family members posed in a studio to emphasize their social status and roles. In contrast, Lee's photographs focus on the reality of being a mother and a wife. They show exhausted mothers, domestic tensions, and the emotional distance between wife and husband. By doing so, this series challenges the traditional idea of the sacrificing mother promoted by Korean society, who loses herself and smiles while doing so.

Unlike her later works, this series is deeply autobiographical and explores her new identity as a newlywed and as a mother following her marriage in the late 1990s. To better understand this new identity, she portrays not only herself, but also her close friends who shared the same lifestyle and experiences as her.

==== Woman's House II (2004) ====
Woman's House I was followed by the series Woman's House II (2004), in which the artist depicts extended families during traditional holidays in the Korean countryside, such as Chuseok (Korean Thanksgiving Day) and the Lunar New Year, during which they perform ancestral rites. As with the first series, Lee chose to photograph the families of friends and acquaintances, who were more open to being photographed inside their own home environment.

Unlike in the first series, in these photographs Lee carries out a more general and less autobiographical reflection. She reflects upon the patriarchal family unit and how it functions during holidays and important events, when everyone meets and the power relationships between the family members are shown. These power imbalances are expressed through the need to ask the male members of the family for permission in order to create these photographs.

Lee Sun-Ja's House #1 Ancestral Rites (2004) is a focal photograph in this series. It depicts Lee Sun-Ja's family during an ancestral rite, which is held annually to commemorate ancestors, strengthen connections within the family and reinforce hierarchy. Such rites are more common in rural areas of Korea rather than in large cities such as Seoul, where traditions fade rapidly. During these rites, women usually prepare the room and the food, while men take part in the ritual itself. In this photograph, women observe the ritual from outside the room. The woman to the right of the photograph does not look at what is happening in the room, but turns her gaze to the camera, identifying for a moment with the photographer and with her position as an outsider towards the ritual. At the same time, the child at the center of the photograph seems to be the only one to escape the behaviors imposed by the traditional Korean family, and one wonders whether, as he grows up, he too will become part of this same pattern.

Through this photograph, Sunmin Lee leads the viewer to reflect on the role of women within the traditional Korean family and on how it is (or can be) questioned.

==== Dogye Project (2004 - 2005) ====
Between 2004 and 2005, Sunmin Lee undertook another project called Dogye Project. Dogye is a town located in the Gangwon Province in South Korea, whose economy was mainly based on coal mines until the 1990s. After that period, the city started to experience depopulation, with the younger generation deciding to move to other cities to find more opportunities. Lee's series reflects on how family dynamics change when younger generations decide to leave their hometown.

In the photographs of this series, Lee portrays several Dogye families inside their homes, many of which belonged to the town's old mining company, or visiting their ancestors' tombs. Through these images, she reflects on ancestral ties and on how patriarchal family structures are challenged after the death of the family head.

==== Twins I (2005 - 2006) and Twins II (2007 - 2011) ====
The series Twins I (2005–2006) and Twins II (2007–2011), explores relationships between parents and their children. For Sunmin Lee, these bonds are central to shaping individual identity.

In Twins I, Lee portrays several pairs of mothers and daughters or sisters dressed alike, as if to demonstrate the connection between them and the influence of the parental figure on the child’s development. They are portrayed within the domestic environment and often direct their gaze towards the camera. In Twins II, the photographer uses the same visual language to portray pairs of mothers and daughters or fathers and sons engaged in hobbies or outdoor activities.

==== Translocating Women (2011 - 2013) ====
Translocating Women examines the lives of immigrant women from Southeast Asia. In this photographic series, Lee not only portrays immigrant women in domestic or public settings, but she also photographes their neighbourhoods and the objects they brought with them to South Korea.

== Exhibitions ==
=== Solo exhibitions ===
Throughout her career, Lee took part in numerous solo exhibitions, especially in South Korea, where many of her works are permanently exhibited at the Haslla Arts Museum (Gangneung, Korea), Youngwol Y. Park (Youngwol, Korea) and the National Museum of Modern and Contemporary Art in Seoul. Her last solo exhibition took place in Seoul in 2022 and it was titled MZ in Yuljiro, preceded by From the Father's Times II (2020), held at Bandal Gallery in Seongnam and From the Father's Times I (2020) at Gallery LUX in Seoul. Her first solo exhibition was The Golden Helmet, held at Namy Gallery in Seoul in 1996.

=== Group exhibitions ===
She has also been invited to numerous group exhibitions and photography festivals, such as the Photoville International Photo Festival, held in New York in 2017, and the Seoul Photo Festival - Our Good Day at the North Seoul Museum of Art, in which she participated twice, in 2013 and 2015. She recently exhibited her works at the Contemporary Korean Photography at the Budapest Korean Cultural Center in Hungary (2023), after participating in the group exhibition Cheerful Hertz the previous year at the Art Center MARU in Seoul. Her first group exhibition was City Story, held at the Fuji Photo Salon in Seoul in 1994.

== See also ==
- Korean Photographers
