= Chan-Hyo Bae =

Korean photographer

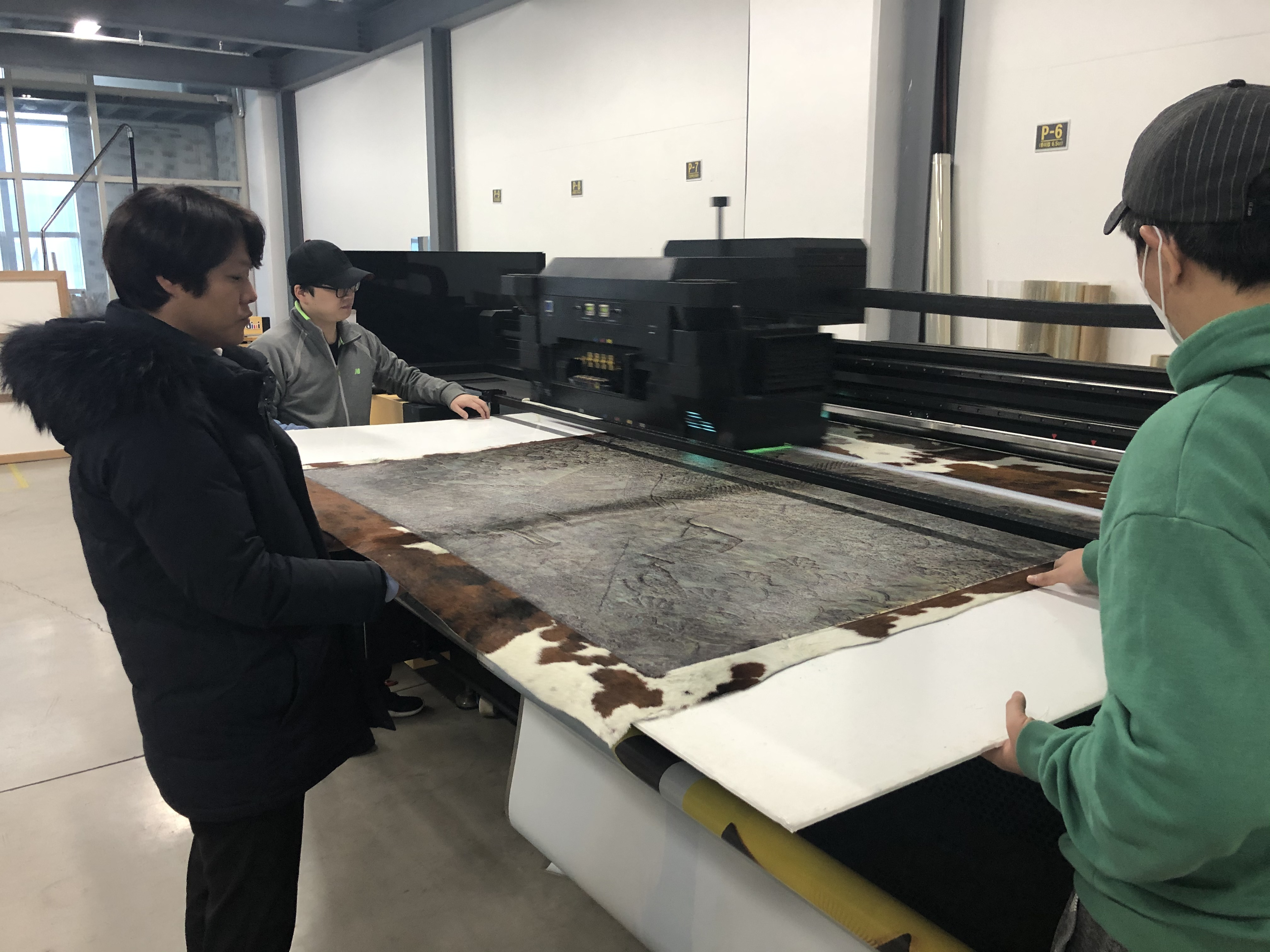
Bae

Chan-Hyo Bae (Korean: 배찬효; born 1975 in South Korea) is a visual artist based in London. He earned a Master of Fine Arts from The Slade School of Fine Art in University College of London in Fine Art Media and a Bachelor of Arts in Photography from Kyungsung University in South Korea. He is currently living and working in London.

== Biography ==
Chan-Hyo Bae was born June 22, 1975, in Busan, South Korea. He studied Photography at Kyungsung University in South Korea. He was initially a photojournalist but then a decision to study fine art in the UK changed everything. In September 2005 he started at the Slade School of Fine Art where he was taught by John Hilliard, a world-renowned conceptual artist who uses photography. This encounter was to alter Bae's perspective and approach as he became a fine artist. Living in London for the past decade has not always been an easy experience for Bae. He has at times felt alienated and isolated; an outsider using an unfamiliar language and living in a different culture. He describes a sense of dislocation, almost disconnection. He also experienced, for the first time, racial prejudice which forced him to consider Western centric ideology that seeks to place a man like himself as ‘other’. He describes this as the Western need to “exclude and diminish differences”. This sense of ‘outsiderness’ has become a core part of his work, as has his exploration of his own identity.

He has produced a range of work using photography. His style of approach is very theatrical and staged producing large scale color prints. In his first series of work entitled Existing in Costume (2006-2007) there is a central subject shown in full length portrait style wearing costumes and holding objects. His next series Fairy Tales Project (2008-2010) has more elaborate staged shots involving quite large props and often several characters played by actors. In Punishment Project (2011-2012) there is one main central figure, with glimpses of other people and characters in the frame. His latest series Witch Hunting Project (2013-2016) involves larger shots, often in landscape format, but in which only one main character appears along with scenes of miraculous events. Evolving across and between all these series are common concerns and themes which give a sense of his artistic voice.

Bae currently lives and primarily works in London, the UK.

== Works ==
Culture, Prejudice and Stereotypes are explored in the work of Korean Artist Chan-Hyo Bae. Since moving into London for further studying from South Korea, He has expressed in his work the feelings of cultural and emotional estrangement he experienced in the UK. Several series with the title Existing in Costume (2006 – 2016) saw him posing in variety of female historical western costumes, integrating himself into a history and society from which he felt excluded. Researched in meticulous detail, he created elaborate scenes of himself as a noblewoman from Elizabethan to Victoria periods.

More recent work in Existing in Costume series has drawn further on the idea of placing oneself into a collective consciousness within the dimensions of nationality. He has chosen as his subject Tudor history as well as the realms of western fairytales: stories that have permeated our culture and become embedded into our general psyche.

In his series, Jumping Into, Chan-Hyo Bae places himself at the center of paintings from the collection of the National Gallery in London by celebrated western painters, Titian, Rubens and Jan de Beer. He has selected paintings of Christian or Mythological subject. His historical impersonations enter the realm of the surreal, as the artist sets himself into a newly crafted animal skin patchwork painting. The paint seems to be cracking, disappearing in parts, as the artist pastes in the layers of his new composition.

From the latest work, Chan-Hyo Bae had a question asking whether absolute faith and extreme beliefs are the fundamental causes leading to the hatred and detestation, rejection and oppression, and madness and violence. He is seeking answers to this question from Occident's Eye project (2019-2020). Occident's Eye exposes the reality of violence represented by absolute faith. It recognises generosity and tolerance for others and the presence of communities living in ways different from humans, and asserts we need to try to live in harmony with all living things. And He challenged the limits of photography and attempted to extend the work to multi-dimensional installations and videos.

== Exhibitions ==
Chan-Hyo Bae's work has been shown in many international exhibitions including Kunsthalle Wien in Austria; Museum of Quai Branly in France; Jewish Museum in the UK; The Museum of Fine Art in USA; National Museum of Modern and Contemporary Art in Korea; Natural History Museum in France; Russian Museum in Russia; LEEUM Samsung Museum of Art in Korea; Vestfossen Kunst Laboratorium in Norway; Worker and Kolkhoz Woman Museum in Russia; Seoul Museum of Art in Korea; Daegu Art Museum in Korea; The Museum of Modern Art in Azerbaijan; Royal Academy of Arts in the UK; Pohang Museum of Steel Art in Korea; Museum of Arts and Design in USA; Seoul Olympic Museum of Art in Korea; Colorado Photographic Arts Center in USA; Cite Internationale des Arts in France; GoEun Museum of Photography in Korea; Aberystwyth Arts Centre in the UK; Gothenburg Museum of Art in Sweden; Baerum Kunsthall in Norway; Santa Barbara Museum of Art in USA; Govt. College of Fine Arts Museum in India; National Museum of Singapore in Singapore; The Museum of Photography in Korea; Savina Museum of Contemporary Art in Kore; Saatchi Gallery in the UK; Format International Photography Festival in the UK; Progetti Arte Contemporanea in Italy; Chosun University Museum of Art in Korea; Wu-Min Art Center in Korea, Fondazione Palazzo Magnani in Italy, Lithuanian National Museum of Art Vilnius in Lithuania, Korean Cultural Center, Brussels in Belgium, Palazzo Tagliaferro Contemporary Culture Center, Andora in Italy, Busan International Photo Festival in Korea, National Museum of Modern and Contemporary Art, Cheongju in Korea, The State Russian Museum Exhibition Centre ROSPHOTO, Saint-Petersburg in Russia, Deagu Photo Biennale, Deagu in Korea, Fondazione Palazzo Magnani, Reggio Emilia in Italy, Vestfossen Kunst Laboratorium, Vestfossen in Norway, Le Murate. Progetti Arte Contemoranea, Florence in Italy, etc...

== Public collections ==
Chan-Hyo Bae's work is found in major museum collections worldwide, including

- Museum of Fine Arts in Huston, USA
- Deutsche Bank Art Collection in the UK
- Leeum Samsung Museum of Art in Korea
- Victorian and Albert Museum, London in the UK
- Santa Barbara Museum of Art in USA
- Korea University Museum in Korea
- Vestfossen Kunstlaboratorium, Vestfossen in Norway
- Statoil Art Collection in Norway
- University of Warwick Art Collection in the UK
- Suwon Ipark Museum of Art in Korea
- Seoul Museum of Art in Korea
- ARARIO Museum in Korea
- Aberystwyth Arts Centre in the UK
- University of Nottingham Museum, Nottingham in the UK
- Art Bank National Museum in Korea
- Colorado Photographic Arts Center in USA
- Sovereign Art Foundation in Hong Kong
- Hasselblad Foundation in Sweden
- Space K Museum in Korea
- Seoul National University Museum of Art, Seoul in Korea
- The Museum of Photography in Korea
- Ben Uri Gallery and Museum in the UK
- Bærum Kunsthall, Fornebu in Norway
- Clamp Art Gallery in New york, USA
- National Museum of Modern and Contemporary, Seoul in Korea

== Publications ==
- A Cultural History of Fairy Tales in the Modern Age, Bloomsbury Academic, London: UK, 2023
- Imaging Migration in Post-War Britain_Artists of Chinese, Korean, Japanese and Taiwanese Heritage, Routledge: UK, 2022
- Queering the Subversive Stitch_Men and the Culture of Needlework, Bloomsbury Publishing, London: UK, 2021
- Occident's Eye, The Museum of Photography, Seoul: Korea, 2020
- The Routledge Companion to Media and Fairy-Tale Cultures, Routledge: UK, 2018
- Existing in Costume, The Museum of Photography, Seoul: Korea, 2018
- Contemporary Korean Photography, HATJE CANTZ: Germany, 2017
- from DOG BRIDEGOOM to WOLF GIRL, Wayne State University Press: USA, 2015
- Contemporary Photography In Asia, PRESTEL; USA, 2013
- Fairy Tales Transformed?: Twenty-First-Century Adaptations and the Politics of Wonder,
- Wayne State University Press; USA, 2013
- Looking in: Photographic Portraits by Maud Sulter and Chan-Hyo Bae, Jewish Museum of Art; UK, 2013
- New Photography in Korea, Galerie Paris-Beijing; France, 2011
- Korean Eye; Contemporary Korean Art, SKIRA; UK, 2010
- Chaotic Harmony; Contemporary Korean Photography, Yale University Press: USA, 2009
