= This Place (art project) =

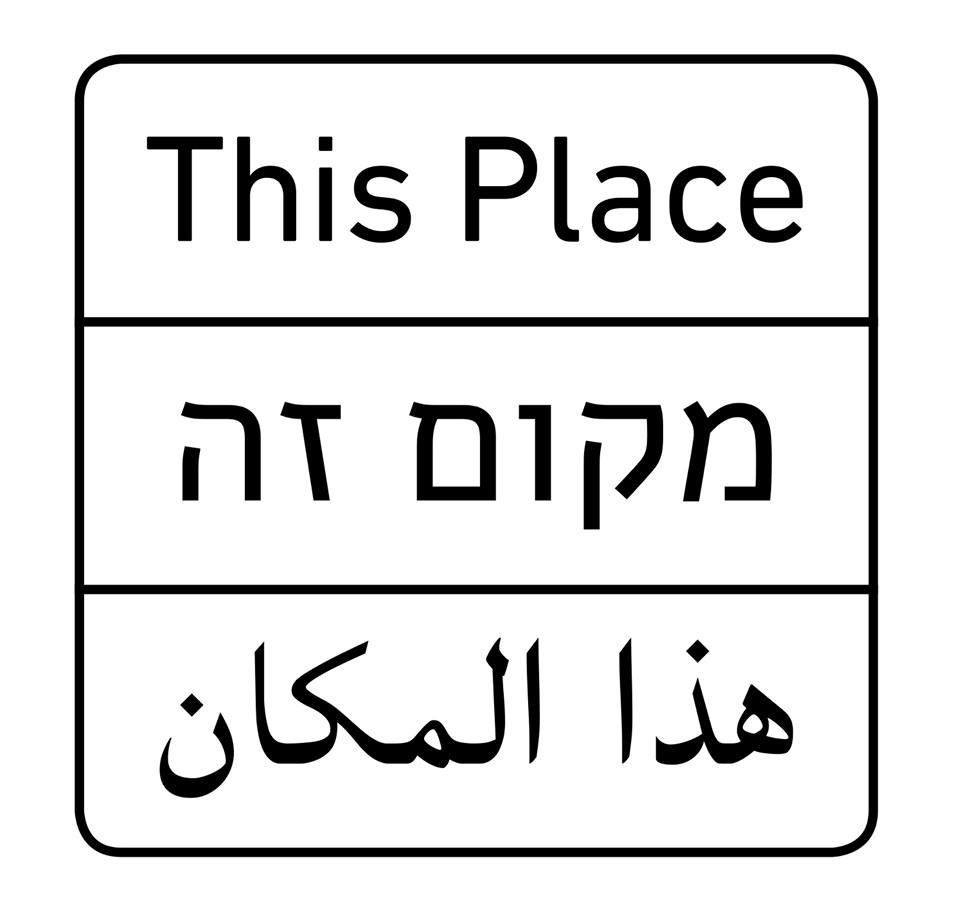
- Company type: Cooperative
- Industry: Photography
- Founded: 2006
- Founder: Frédéric Brenner
- Area served: Worldwide
- Website: this-place.org

This Place was a global art project that explored the complexity of Israel and the West Bank through the eyes of twelve photographers: Frédéric Brenner, Gilles Peress (France); Wendy Ewald, Fazal Sheikh, Stephen Shore, Rosalind Solomon (USA); Martin Kollar (Slovakia); Josef Koudelka (Czech Republic); Jungjin Lee (South Korea); Thomas Struth (Germany); Jeff Wall (Canada); and Nick Waplington (Britain). Each photographer created works in response to his or her own experience in the area; a total of over 500 images were exhibited internationally and published in a series of monographs.

== History ==
Initiated by Frédéric Brenner, the project followed in the tradition of endeavors such as the Missions Héliographiques in nineteenth-century France and the Farm Security Administration in the United States, which gathered artists who used photography to ask essential questions about culture, society and the inner lives of individuals. Each artist spent about six months in residence, traveling throughout Israel and the West Bank, following his or her own line of investigation. Brenner offered the photographers initial exploratory visits, so they could decide if, and how, they wanted to be involved with the project. According to Time: "This Place is not an act of photojournalism, nor does it contain — or send – a clear, unified message."

== Exhibitions ==
The completed work was organized into an exhibition, curated by Charlotte Cotton, who stated that “Each artist has created a profound and personal narration of Israel and the West Bank, that, collectively, act a series of guides, leading the viewer into a deeper identification with the complexities and conflicts of the Holy Land." The exhibition was scheduled to open at DOX Centre for Contemporary Art in Prague on October 24, 2014, thereafter traveling to the Tel Aviv Museum of Art, the Brooklyn Museum, the Norton Museum of Art, and other museums in Europe, the United States, and Asia.
