= Andrew B. Bocarsly =

American academic

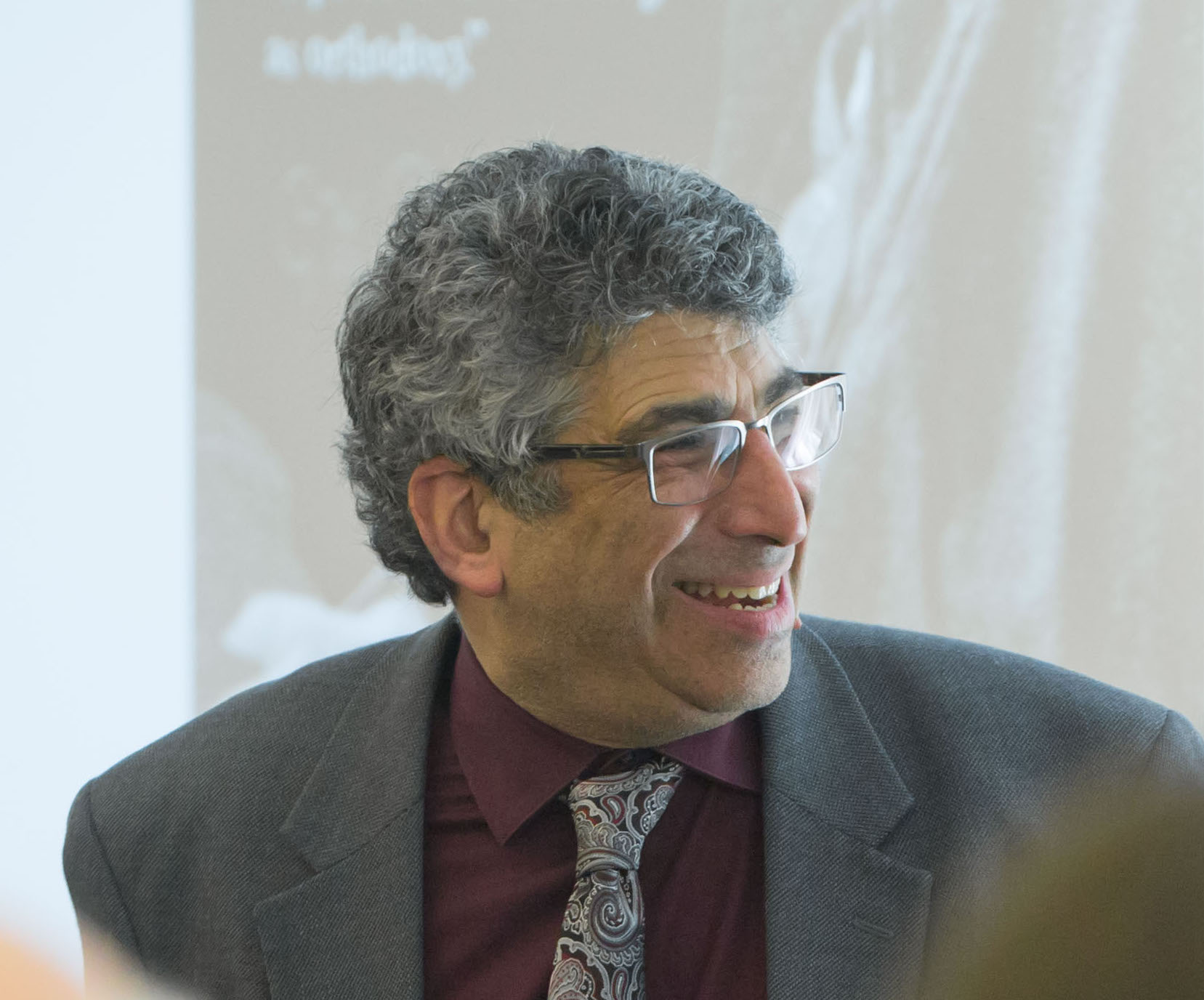
- Born: April 23, 1954; Los Angeles, California, USA
- Education: University of California, Los Angeles, Massachusetts Institute of Technology
- Scientific career
- Workplaces: Princeton University

Andrew Bruce Bocarsly (born April 23, 1954) is currently a professor at Princeton University, New Jersey. His primary research interests lie in physical inorganic chemistry. He conducts research in electrochemistry, photochemistry, solids state chemistry, and fuel cells, and is known for his work on alternate energy solutions involving processes and materials for photo-reduction and electro-reduction.

== Education and career ==
Bocarsly graduated with a B.S., magna cum laude, from the University of California, Los Angeles with a double major in chemistry and physics (June 1976). There he worked with John Gladysz on research involving metal vapor synthesis. In June 1980 he received his PhD from Massachusetts Institute of Technology for research on charge transfer processes on semiconductors. Starting in 1980, he was assistant and associate professor at Princeton University where he is currently a full professor. Bocarsly currently teaches the second course of the introductory General Chem sequence at Princeton.

== Carbon dioxide ==
Bocarsly's publications include around 200 refereed journal papers, multiple patents, and the edited book Fuel Cells and Hydrogen Storage (2011). Bocarsly has published on catalysts for the reduction of carbon dioxide to organic products. With Emily Barton Cole, he has worked on the selective conversion of carbon dioxide to methanol. This interest in artificial photosynthesis led to the founding of the company Liquid Light in 2009.

== Awards ==
Bocarsly has been recognized with the following awards.

- Sloan Research Fellow (1986)
- American Chemical Society, EXXON Solid State Chemistry Fellowship (1984)
- The Camille and Henry Dreyfus Foundation Newly Appointed Faculty Grant (1980)
- DuPont Young Faculty Grant (1980)
- Sigma Pi Sigma - National Physics Honor Society
- President's Undergraduate Research Fellowship UCLA (1975)
