= Alison Cornyn =

Alison Cornyn is a Brooklyn and Hudson Valley-based interdisciplinary artist, activist and educator. She is a founding partner and the Creative Director of Picture Projects Studio Cornyn is also the Creative Director of the Guantanamo Public Memory Project and States of Incarceration. She was a TED Resident in 2017 and gave a TED Talk that was released in November 2017. In addition, Cornyn teaches at SVA, in the Design for Social Innovation MFA program. She has also taught at Parsons The New School's Humanities Action Lab and New York University Tisch School of the Arts Interactive Telecommunications Program. Her work revolves around combining traditional media and modern technology to foster dialogue concerning social justice issues, especially around the criminal justice system. Cornyn serves on the board of the New York City Municipal Archives and Library. She and her partner, Gilles Peress, live in Brooklyn with their three children.

Over the course of her career, Cornyn has created many exhibitions, web platforms, films, and physical installations that focus on modern social justice issues. Cornyn has received multiple grants and awards for her work in social justice and media, including a Peabody Award.

== Education ==
Cornyn received her bachelor's in Fine Arts and Art History at Connecticut College. She also received a Master of Fine Arts degree at Hunter College as well as a Master of Professional Studies at NYU's Tisch School of the Arts in the Interactive Telecommunications Program (ITP). She then went on to complete the Whitney Museum's Independent Study Program (ISP) in New York City.

== Exhibitions, web platforms and films ==
Cornyn's projects have been showcased at exhibitions and film festivals around the world as well as on the web. Her projects include Incorrigibles, the Sonic Memorial Project, and 360 Degrees- Perspectives on the U.S. Criminal Justice System,, which is a web documentary that examines incarceration from multiple perspectives. Another one of her works is The Sand Counting Lab, which was a large-scale project focused on counting over two million grains of sand in an effort to represent the number of people incarcerated in the United States. Incorrigibles is a long-term project about the history of young women's incarceration. Short films in collaboration with Heather Greer include 'The Halfway Between All This' which premiered at The Calgary International Film Festival and screened at The Big Apple Film Festival in NYC and Venezia Shorts where it won "Best Experimental Short". The documentary short, "Hilda O. vs. The State of New York," premiered at the Raindance Film Festival in London. and won 'Best Documentary' in the New York State Film Festival in Albany.

== Awards and grants ==
Cornyn has received several awards for her work. Among these was the first Peabody Award to go to a web documentary, the 62nd Annual Peabody Award. She has also been awarded with the Gracie Allen Award for Women in Media and a Webby Award for net.art.

Cornyn's has also received several grants and fellowships throughout her career. Among these was a National Endowment for the Humanities grant, a grant from the Creative Capital Foundation, a fellowship from the New York Foundation for the Arts and grants from the New York State Council on the Arts (NYSCA). She was a grant recipient in the inaugural round of New York City's groundbreaking "Made in NY" Women's Film, TV & Theatre Fund from the Mayor's Office of Film, Theatre & Broadcasting. Her project Incorrigibles has received Post-Incarceration Humanities Partnership (PIHP) grants from Humanities New York and the Andrew W. Mellon Foundation PIHP is a cohort-based program that supports organizations that incorporate the humanities into their work of serving formerly incarcerated individuals and their families.
