= Jay Solomon =

American businessman

10th Administrator of the General Services Administration
- In office April 30, 1977 – March 31, 1979
- President: Jimmy Carter
- Preceded by: Jack Eckerd
- Succeeded by: Rowland G. Freeman III

Personal details
- Born: June 22, 1921 Chattanooga, Tennessee, US
- Died: July 30, 1984 (aged 63) Nashville, Tennessee, US
- Political party: Democratic

Joel Warren "Jay" Solomon (June 22, 1921 – July 30, 1984) was an American businessman who served as Administrator of the General Services Administration from 1977 to 1979. During his tenure, he worked to root out corruption in his agency.

A native of Chattanooga, Tennessee, he was the son of Abe J. and Ida Borisky Solomon. He was a graduate of Vanderbilt University. His family owned a move theatre chain, which they later sold and he became involved in developing shopping centers. His first marriage was to the photographer Rosalind Fox Solomon (1953 – 1984). They had two children together, Joel and Linda.

He died of kidney problems on July 30, 1984, in Nashville, Tennessee at age 63. The U.S. Post Office and Courthouse Building in Chattanooga was renamed in his honor.
