= Min Chung Sik =

Korean documentary photographer

Min Ch'ung-Sik (born 민충식; 1890 - 1977) was a Korean documentary photographer and a forerunner of Korean Modern photography. Born in Seoul, most of his works were produced during the era of portrait photography (1910s to 1940s). Min's unique art norm showcased the circumstances of the continuum of aesthetics of modern photography. He is best known for teaching portrait photography as a tool of recreation and expression. His strong influence led the trends of defining the developing genre of photography and its relationship with visual art culture. From the 1880s to the 1940s, Min Ch'ung-Sik experimented with artistic trends before liberation from Japan through portraits of family, landscapes, objects, and places.

== Background ==
Min Ch'ung-Sik showed a passion for photography through the spirit of documenting the everyday interactions under a colonized Korea. His works can be categorized throughout the early stages of Korean art photography, whilst breaking away from the norm of studio or landscape photos. He mainly worked with portrait photography and drew inspiration from Korean ink paintings that date back to the Joseon dynasty, which are still deeply rooted in symbolic origins. Photography reflects Min's strong artistic emotions and reactions to modernization, while living under a colonized country of the early twentieth century.

=== Education ===
Min Ch'ung-Sik learned the techniques and the art of photography from classes offered at the Seoul YMCA and then went on to graduate and teach photography. Min was among the first graduates of the YMCA Photography department in 1910. After studying at Ryeongshin School, he went to Meiji University in Japan and majored in economics. In 1920, he worked for the Kodak office in Shanghai, and in 1927, he became a founding member of the Association of Photographers in Seoul. . Between 1910 and 1920, the various photographic works he produced proved his penchant for creating documentaries. In 1927, Min published a small thesis on the documentary quality of photography. Three years later, he opened the Taepyeongyang Photo Studio in Nakwon-dong and mainly produced panoramic photographs of Seoul.

=== Career ===
Before returning to Korea, Min Ch'ung-Sik briefly worked as a salesman in Shanghai, China. Due to majoring in economics, he was also able to be successful with the scale and promotion method of his photography studio. He experimented with photographs of Seoul and published them in Japanese art books, which had not been done before by other Korean photographers.

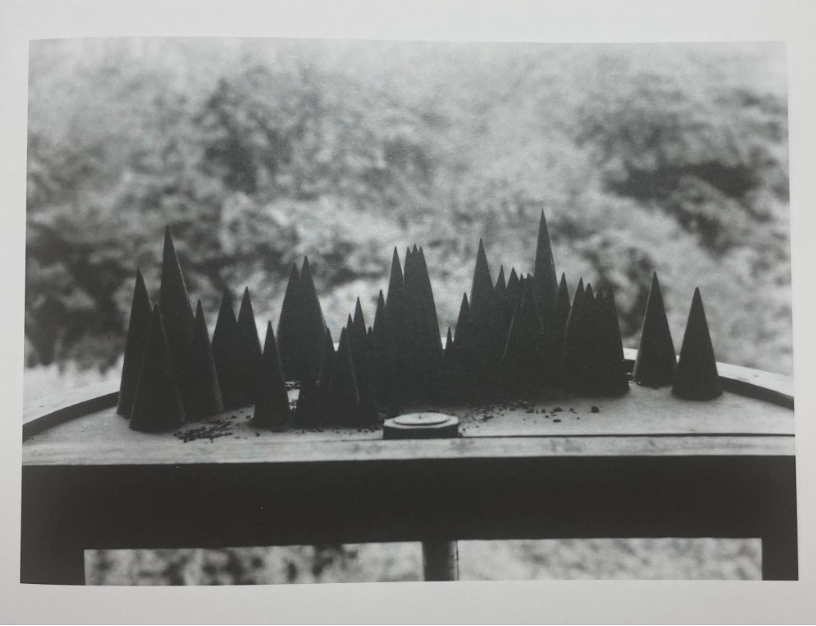
Panoramic Still Life of Mount Geumgang, Seoul. Circa 1910-1920s

His work was included in The Five Forerunners of Korean Modern Photography exhibition at the Museum of Photography in Seoul, and in a show of Korean modern art at the Los Angeles County Museum of Art.

== Genre of photography and works ==
=== Portrait photography ===
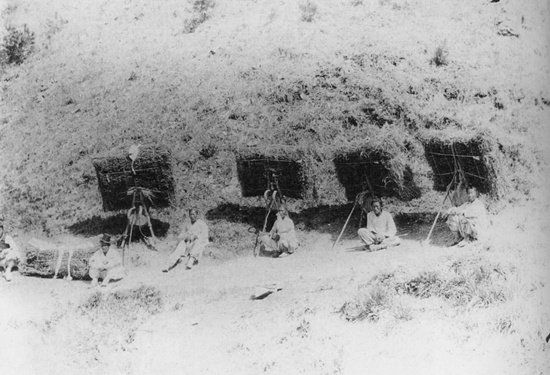
Firewood Vendor, circa 1907 Documentary filmed between Dae-jeon and Geum-san

"Even if you try, it's impossible to hide anything in a photograph. Since photography is an art that captures all the things that are there in a specific time. Photography is a record of fact, so [that is where] I store all my films. For instance, let us assume that we've discovered scripture. It is difficult to maintain scripture eternally. Also, as time flows, it gets worn out. However, if you just take a photo of that scripture, you still have access to it ten thousand years after. From now on, if you photograph places, they become artifacts of the world."

This quote spoken by Min Ch'ung Sik, explains the captivity of photography. As an artist, Min had a passionate understanding of the importance of photography and the value it holds. He believed that most other ordinary photographs failed to acknowledge.

Continual photography consisted of motion and facial features. For example, through the model of a magician is in midst of a trick or striking a pose, Min depicted the magician comically through a silent narrative of photography.

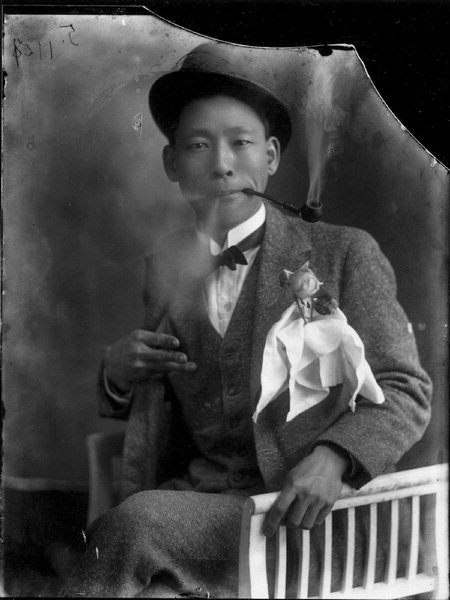
Portrait 3 called the Cigarette Man. Part of the Magican SeriesGelatin silver print, Circa 1930s

=== Works ===
Panoramic Photographs of Seoul
Title	Between 1910 and 1920	Size
Self Portrait Magician Series |, ||, |||	Unknown	16.5 x 12.1 cm
Jong-ro Yeondong Church	Circa 1900	13.5 x 18.3 cm
Western-Style Wedding Ceremony |	Circa 1910	8.8 x 14.4 cm
Western-Style Wedding Ceremony ||	Circa 1910	8.3 x 14.2 cm
Still Life of Mount Geumgang	Unknown	11.2 x 16.2 cm
Young Child	Unknown	20.4 x 26.9 cm

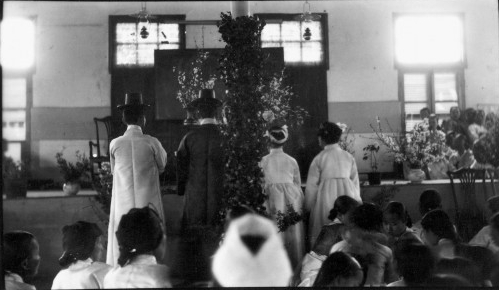
A commemorative photo taken during the wedding ceremony at Yeondong, Seoul Church.

=== Era of portrait photography from 1910 to 1920 ===
Between 1910 and 1920, the various photograph works he produced proved his penchant for creating documentary photography. Up until the 1940s, his works include photographs of Yeondong Church, Western-style wedding ceremonies, scenic panoramic photographs of Seoul, and self portraits. The continual photography focuses on capturing places and events. This allowed Min to capture and experiment with the moments and perspective of everyday life and culture in a modernizing, yet colonized era.

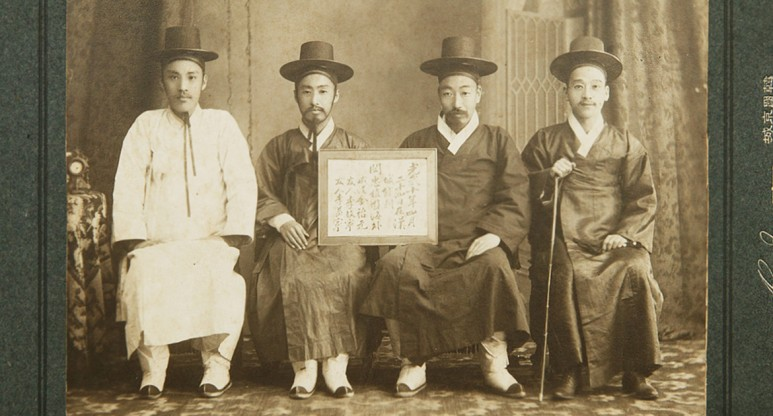
This photo was taken with friends on April 24, 1906, before Min left to study abroad. In the photo, it is presumed that the person on the far right wearing glasses, holding a cane, and wearing Western-style shoes is Min Chu'ng-sik.

This portfolio of camera work was published in conjunction with the exhibition called 'The Five Forerunners of Korean Modern Photography' at the Museum of Photography, Seoul. The first generation of photographers are considered as having strongly influenced the history of Korean photography. Among many different artists, this volume takes a closer look at Min Ch'ung-Sik active years during the era of portrait photography (1910s to 1940s). Min's exhibition included in this photography catalog discusses the era of portrait photography. During the first half of the twentieth century, Min Ch'ung-Sik heavily influenced the history of Korean photography during Japanese colonization.

=== The genre of artistic photography ===
Photography requires two fundamental elements in order to understand the deeper process of its unique history: to define the internal principle of the medium with which the art genre has grown and developed, and to discover relationships between the medium and other surrounding art perspectives. Photography has created its foundation through the process of its historical unfolding, and has close relationships with other art genres, intellectual, and cultural contexts. Koreans have traditionally used the word "Sajin" to refer to photographs. However, today's concept and dynamic connotation of Sajin has been developed in the Western world and Europe. Examining and studying how photography was introduced in Korea, the East Asian belief system, and how photography captures cultural conflicts, has helped to being Korean-ness and a national identity to light. Also, discovering the identity and media-driven culture of Korea has directly dominated the life of modern Korea, when the principles of a camera were first introduced.

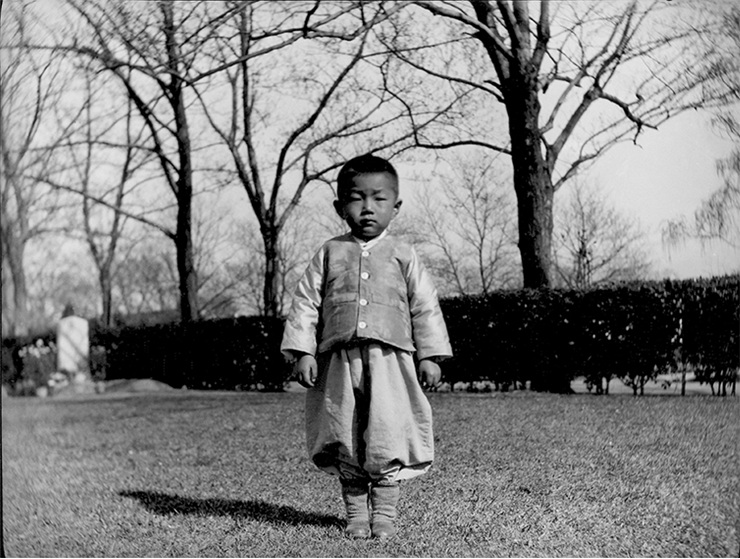
Child Photography, taken circa 1910~1920sGelatin Silver Print (14.5cm x 8.9 cm)

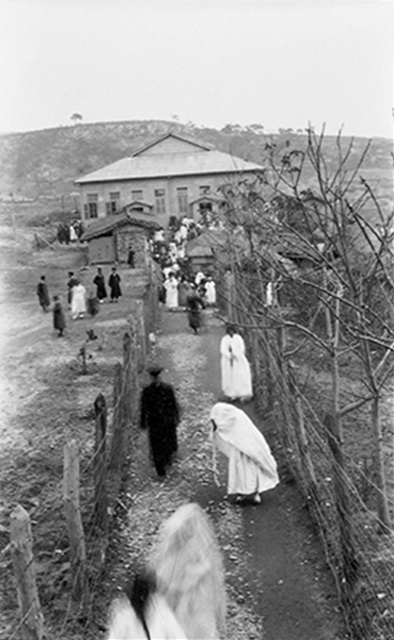
Jongno-Yeondong Church (Village Road)Gelatin Silver Print (16cm x 11.1 cm)

== Legacy ==
During the time that Min Ch'ung-Sik was active, artistic values were imposed on Korean photography and photos Korea's first photography exhibition was held in 1929, welcoming the modernization of Korean photography. Min not only serve as a bridge between early modern photography and portrait photography, he also laid the foundation to portray Korean subjects as more human and unique during the harsh realities of Japanese Colonization. The works of Min can be categorized into the early stages of Korean art photography, whilst breaking away from the norm of studio or landscape photos.

Min Ch'ung-Sik experimented and expressed beauty during times when Korean culture was struggling due to the flood of colonialism and Western foreigners. Overall, his exhibition reflects artistic emotions and reactions to modernization, His experimentation went beyond the confines of the norm by examining the representation of how western and eastern thematics blend together to underscore portrait photography.

=== Influence and contributions ===
Min Ch'ung-Sik's was a part of a generation of pioneers who played with art forms. These original black and white photographs filled a chasm not only in the visual archive of modern Korean photography, but also in the visual vernacular of this particular period. The captivating imagery in Min's collection showcases a pivotal role in the development of photography. Through his influence and later as a teacher, Min revealed everyday life through visual diversity as important aspects of Korea's nearly forgotten past. The photographs offer a counter-narrative of ordinary lives during this turbulent period of Korean colonialism. These photographs are documentary, but at the same time aesthetically charged, illustrating and illuminating the traces and trails of Korean life as seen through Korean eyes. Min Ch'ung-Sik moved away from art photography to advocating realism and documentary photography, thus becoming a founder and leader in the realist movement during the era of portrait photography.
