= Jungjin Lee =

Korean photographer and artist (born 1961)

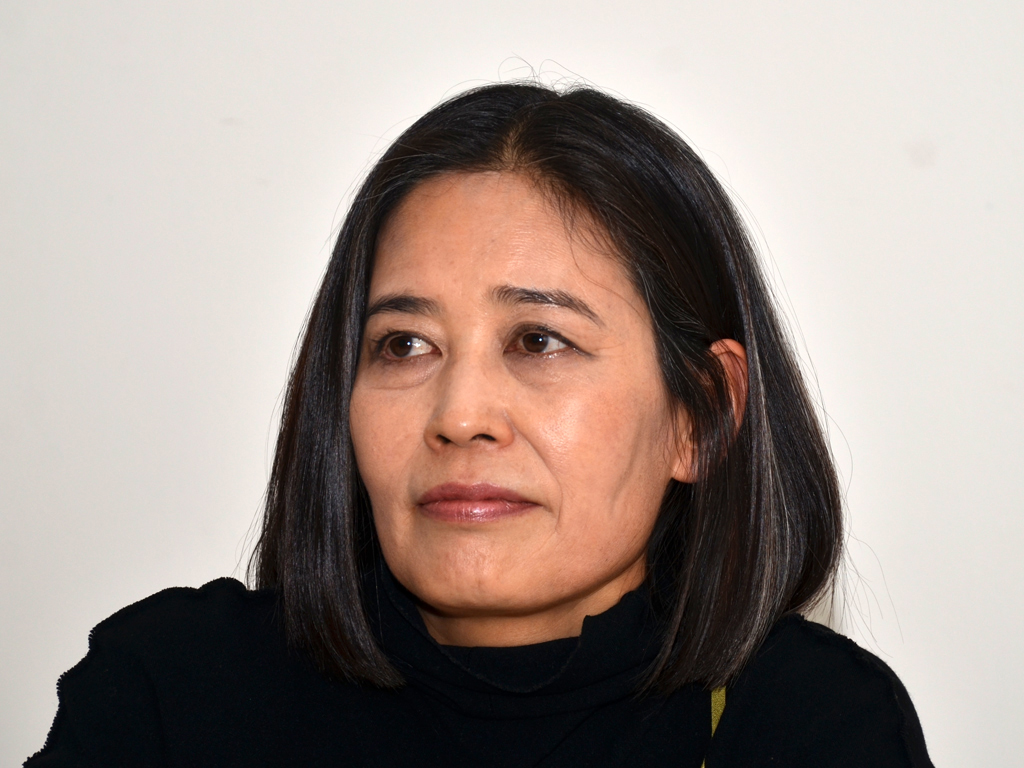
- Jungjin Lee (2014)
- Born: Jungjin Lee; 1961 (age 64–65); South Korea
- Education: Hongik University, New York University
- Known for: Photography
- Awards: Photography Award, The Camera Club of New York, Anonymous Was A Woman Award, New York, Dong Gang Photography Award, Yeongwol, Korea

Jungjin Lee (born 1961) is a South Korean photographer and artist who currently lives and works in New York City.

== Early life and education ==
Lee was born in South Korea in 1961. She studied calligraphy in childhood and majored in ceramics at Hongik University, graduating with a Bachelor's of Fine Art in 1984. She earned a Master of Arts in photography from New York University in 1992. After graduating Lee worked as a photojournalist and later as a freelance photographer.

In 1987, she completed a year-long project documenting the life of an old man who made his living hunting for wild ginseng. This experience motivated Lee to enrol on an MA in photography at New York University in New York City.

== Work ==
While in New York City, Lee worked for the photographer Robert Frank. Later, she took a road trip across the United States. In her travels she encountered the American desert, a landscape that she was deeply moved by and which became the subject of several of her photographic series, including Desert (1990–94), American Desert I–IV (1990–1996), On Road (2000–01), Wind (2004–07) and Remains (2012–). Lee photographs these barren landscapes when they are transformed by the tumultuous weather, discarded refuse, decaying structures and by her own photographic process.

Lee's Unnamed Road (2010–12) was part of This Place.

== Photographic process ==
Lee uses a medium format panoramic camera. She prints on traditional Korean paper which she hand sensitizes with a brush using Liquid Light. This print is then scanned and Lee further manipulates the image in Photoshop. The resulting image is a high contrast black and white print, in which the indexical brush marks are still visible. Lee effaces the technological capability of her digital camera to communicate her emotional state of mind at the time she takes the photograph to the viewer. This process also results in an image that recalls traditional Asian ink painting.

== Recognition ==
Lee's photographic practice is important within the context of contemporary Korean photography.

Photo scholar and critic Eugenia Parry explores Lee's series through the lens of Buddhist spirituality in the essay that accompanies Lee's photobook Wind. Parry observes that in Lee's photographs she contrasts discarded props of human life with the land, symbolically acting as her on Buddhist teacher, asking viewers to "view ordinary things, love change, tolerate absolute incomprehensibility. Contemplate the temporal, recognize the celestial".

Photo critic and historian Vicki Goldberg observes that Lee's landscapes represent her own, "introspective states and thoughts." While the majority of Lee's work focuses on the land; in several series she explores other subjects including Pagodas (1998); crumbling Buddhist sculptures, Buddhas (2002); everyday objects, Thing (2003–06) and portraits, Breath (2009–).

== Publications ==
- Lee, Jungjin (1988). Lonely Cabin in a Far Away Island. Seoul: Yeolwha-Dang Art.
- Lee, Jungjin (1993). Jungjin Lee: The American Deserts. Seoul: Shigak.
- Lee, Jungjin (1997). Wasteland. Seoul: Art Space Seoul.
- Lee, Jungjin (2000). Jungjin Lee: Beyond Photography. Seoul: Shigak.
- Lee, Jungjin (2001). On Road/Ocean. Seoul: Kukje Gallery.
- Lee, Jungjin (2002). Desert. New York: Jungjin Lee and Sepia International.
- Lee, Jungjin (2005). Thing. Seoul: Minseogak.
- Lee, Jungjin (2006). Jungjin Lee. Seoul: Yeolwha-Dang Art.
- Lee, Jungjin (2009). Wind. New York: Aperture Foundation/Sepia International.
- Lee, Jungjin (2014). Unnamed Road. London: Mack.
- Lee, Jungjin (2016). Everglades. Paso Robles, USA: Nazraeli.
- Lee, Jungjin (2016). Echo. Germany: Fotomuseum Winterthur, Spector Book.
- Lee, Jungjin (2016). Everglades. USA: Nazraeli Press.
- Lee, Jungjin (2017). Opening. USA: Nazraeli Press.
- Lee, Jungjin (2017). Desert. USA: Radius Books.
- Lee, Jungjin (2021). Simmani. Korea: IANN Books.
- Lee, Jungjin (2022). Voice. USA: Nazraeli Press.
- Lee, Jungjin (2023). Unnamed Road. Korea; USA: Goeun Museum Of Photography; Nazraeli Press.
- Lee, Jungjin (2025). Thing. Korea: Datz Press.

- A Lonely Cabin In A Far Away Island, The Camera Club of New York, New York City, 1989
- Blue Sky Gallery, Portland, OR, USA, 1992
- Self Portrait, PaceMacGill Gallery, New York City, 1995
- Buddha, Museum of Photography, Seoul, Korea, 2002
- Blue Sky Gallery, Portland, OR, USA, 2003
- Road To The Wind, Goeun Museum Of Photography, Busan, Korea, 2008
- Wind By Jungjinlee, Aperture Gallery, New York City, 2011
- Thing, Andrea Robbi Museum, St.Moritz, Switzerland, 2013
- Echo, Fotomuseum Winterthur, Winterthur, Switzerland, 2016; Stadtische Galerie Wolfsburg, Wolfsburg, Germany, 2017; National Museum of Modern and Contemporary Art, Gwacheon, South Korea, March–July 2018 A retrospective.
- "Jungjin Lee: Unseen", Huxley-Parlour, London, England, 2025

== Collections ==
Lee's work is held in the following public collections:

- Metropolitan Museum of Art: 9 prints (as of 27 December 2021)
- Whitney Museum of American Art: 1 print (as of 27 December 2021)
- Museum of Photography, Seoul
