= Gilles Peress =

French photographer (born 1946)

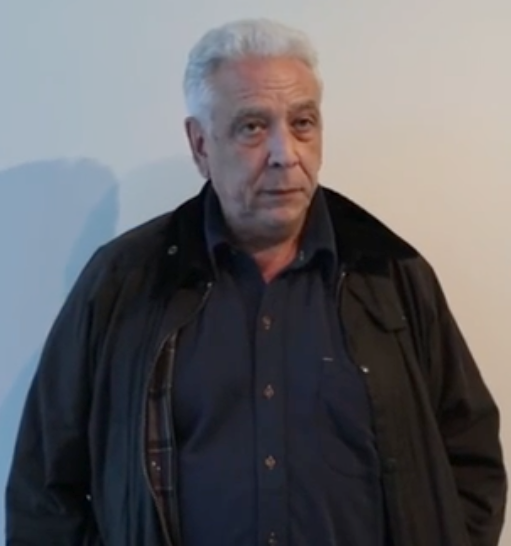
- In a Brooklyn Museum video in 2016
- Born: 29 December 1946 (age 79); Neuilly-sur-Seine, France
- Education: Institute d'Etudes Politiques; University of Vincennes
- Occupation: Photographer

Gilles Peress (born 29 December 1946) is a French photographer and a member of Magnum Photos.

Peress began working with photography in 1970, having previously studied political science and philosophy in Paris. One of Peress' first projects examined immigration in Europe, and he has since documented events in Northern Ireland, Lebanon, Palestine, Iran, the Balkans, Rwanda, the U.S., Afghanistan and Iraq. His ongoing project, Hate Thy Brother, a cycle of documentary narratives, looks at intolerance and the re-emergence of nationalism throughout the world and its consequences.

Peress' books include Whatever You Say, Say Nothing; Annals of the North; Telex Iran; The Silence: Rwanda; Farewell to Bosnia; The Graves: Srebrenica and Vukovar; A Village Destroyed; and Haines.

Peress' work has been exhibited and is collected by the Museum of Modern Art, Metropolitan Museum of Art, Whitney Museum of American Art and MoMA PS1, all in New York; Art Institute of Chicago; Corcoran Gallery of Art, Washington, D.C; San Francisco Museum of Modern Art; J. Paul Getty Museum in Los Angeles; Walker Art Center and Minneapolis Institute of Arts; Victoria and Albert Museum in London; Musée d'Art Moderne de la Ville de Paris, Musée Picasso, Parc de la Villette and Centre Georges Pompidou in Paris; Museum Folkwang, Essen; and Sprengel Museum in Hannover.

Awards and fellowships Peress has received include a Guggenheim Fellowship, National Endowment for the Arts grants, Pollock-Krasner and New York State Council on the Arts fellowships, the W. Eugene Smith Grant for Humanistic Photography and the International Center of Photography Infinity Award.

Peress is Professor of Human Rights and Photography at Bard College in New York and Senior Research Fellow at the Human Rights Center at UC Berkeley. Peress joined Magnum Photos in 1971 and served three times as vice president and twice as president of the co-operative. He and his wife, Alison Cornyn, live in Brooklyn with their three children.

== Life and work ==
Peress was born 29 December 1946, in Neuilly-sur-Seine, France and grew up in Paris with his mother, an orthodox Christian from the Middle East, and his father, who was of Jewish and Georgian descent. Peress studied at the Institute d'Etudes Politiques in Paris from 1966 to 1968 and then at the University of Vincennes until 1971. Peress began working as a photographer in 1970, embarking on an intimate portrayal of life in a French village, Decazeville, as it emerged from the ashes of a debilitating labor dispute. In 1973 he photographed Turkish immigrant workers in West Germany and documented the European policy to import cheap labor from the third world. He then joined Magnum Photos.

Peress soon traveled to Northern Ireland to begin an ongoing 20-year project about the Irish civil rights struggle. One of his most famous pictures from this period captures a young man named Patrick Doherty moments before he was killed whilst crawling to safety in the forecourt of the Rossville flats during Bloody Sunday. Whatever You Say, Say Nothing a book that synthesizes his years of work in Northern Ireland, is the third part of his ongoing project called Hate Thy Brother, a cycle of documentary stories that describe intolerance and the re-emergence of nationalism in the postwar years. Farewell to Bosnia was the first part of this cycle, and The Silence, a book about the genocide in Rwanda, was the second. The Washington Post said Whatever You Say, Say Nothing, which was awarded the Special Mention at the 2021 Recontres d'Arles book awards, "will surely go down as one of the most compelling photographic works of our time."

In 1979 Peress traveled to Iran in the midst of the Revolution. His book, Telex Iran: In the Name of Revolution, is about the fragile relationship between American and Iranian cultures during the hostage crisis. Peress has also completed other major projects, including a photographic study of the lives of Turkish immigrant workers in Germany, and an examination of the contemporary legacy of the Latin American liberator Simon Bolivar.

Peress participated in the photography collective This Place, organized by photographer Frédéric Brenner. For his project, Peress focused on the village of Silwan, where there are frequent violent clashes between Palestinians and Jewish settlers, and used large format cameras to document his experience.

Peter Galassi, Chief Curator of the Department of Photography at the Museum of Modern Art in New York has said of Peress, "Over the past four decades, in one ambitious project after another, Gilles Peress has creatively transformed and reinvigorated photography's tradition of engaged reportage. Perhaps the most ambitious and sustained of all of those projects is his richly textured and deeply moving visual essay on two decades of bitter conflict that devastated Northern Ireland in the wake of Bloody Sunday in 1972. That extended essay has the gripping immediacy and epic sweep of a novel by Tolstoy."

== Publications ==
- Telex Persan. With Gholam Hassan Saedi. France: Contrejour, 1984
  - Telex Iran: In the Name of Revolution, USA: Aperture, 1984, ISBN 978-0-89381-118-1
  - Telex Iran: In the Name of Revolution, Switzerland: Scalo, 1997, ISBN 978-3-931141-36-3
- Eye for an Eye. New York: Aperture, 1988.
- Farewell to Bosnia. Switzerland: Scalo, USA: Distributed Art Publishers, 1994. ISBN 978-1-881616-22-1
- The Silence. Rwanda. Switzerland/USA/Germany: Scalo, 1995. ISBN 978-1-881616-38-2
- The Graves: Srebrenica and Vukovar. Switzerland/USA/Germany Scalo, 1998. With Eric Stover. ISBN 978-3-931141-76-9
- Here is New York: A Democracy of Photographs. Scalo, 2002. Photography collective. Photo editing, sequencing, and design by Peress. ISBN 3-908-247-66-7
- A Village Destroyed. UC Press, 2002. Photographs by Peress, with text by Eric Stover and Fred Abrahams. ISBN 0-520-23303-4
- Haines, Photo Poche. Actes Sud, 2004. Photographs and text by Peress. ISBN 2-7427-5355-9
- The Rockaways. Concord Free Press, 2013. Photographs by Peress, edited with an introduction by Hamilton Fish. ISBN 978-0-9847078-8-1
- Whatever You Say, Say Nothing. Steidl, 2021. ISBN 9783958295445
- Annals of the North. Steidl, 2021. By Chris Klatell and Peress, with texts by Klatell. ISBN 9783958297937

== Filmography ==
- A Peruvian Equation (1992). Part of the series "The Magnum Eye", made for TV Tokyo.
- Street Musicians (1992). Filmed in NY for M. & Co. Agency, for Benetton.
- Farewell to Bosnia (1994). Video essay.

== New media ==
- Bosnia: Uncertain Paths To Peace. Interactive multimedia photojournalism project for The New York Times, on-Line, 1996. Concept and design Peress with Fred Ritchin. (Note: See https://www.nytimes.com/specials/bosnia/)
- Farewell To Bosnia. with Picture Projects: Text and photographs by Gilles Peress, 1995. (Note: See "PICTURE PROJECTS _ Farewell to Bosnia". Archived from the original on 26 July 2011.)
- Crimes of War. Concept and Design Gilles Peress with html/editorial by Pixelpress. (Note: See "Crimes of War". Archived from the original on 7 December 2013.)
- Human Rights Center at UC Berkeley. Concept and Design Peress with HTML by Pixelpress. (Note: See http://www.hrcberkeley.org/)
- DNA and Human Rights. Concept and Design Peress with html/editorial by Pixelpress. (Note: See http://www.hrcberkeley.org/dna/)
- A Village Destroyed. Concept and Design Peress. (Note: See http://www.hrcberkeley.org/avillagedestroyed/avdhome.html)

== Group projects ==
- Crimes of War Project, co-founder and member of the Board of Directors, 1998 to 2008.
- Crimes of War: What the Public Should Know, WW Norton, 1999, edited by Roy Gutman and David Rieff, concept and design concept by Peress.
- Here is New York: A Democracy of Photographs exhibition Co-founder, 2001, Concept by Peress.
- Access To Life, The Global Fund to fight AIDS with Magnum Photos.
- Postcards From America (Florida) with Magnum Photos.

== Awards ==
- 1977, Apeiron: Artist in Residence
- 1979, National Endowment for the Arts
- 1981, American Institute of Graphic Arts Award
- 1981, Art Director's Club Award
- 1981, Overseas Press Club Award
- 1981, Prix du Premier Livre/Foundation Kodak Pathe
- 1981, Prix de la Critique Couleur
- 1983, Imogen Cunningham Award
- 1983, Fondation Nationale pour la Photographie
- 1984, W. Eugene Smith Award for Humanistic Photography, W. Eugene Smith Memorial Fund. A $15,000 grant "to continue his work documenting the life and the conflict that surrounds it in Northern Ireland".
- 1984, National Endowment for the Arts Fellowship
- 1986, Gahan Fellowship at Harvard University
- 1989, Art Director's Club Award
- 1989, Ernst Haas Award
- 1990, Art Matters Grant
- 1992, National Endowment for the Arts Fellowship
- 1992/93, Guggenheim Fellowship, John Simon Guggenheim Memorial Foundation
- 1993, La Fondation de France Fellowship
- 1995, International Center of Photography Infinity Award for Journalism
- 1995, Camera Works, Inc. Artist Grant
- 1995, Dr. Erich Salomon Award from the German Society for Photography
- 1996, International Center of Photography Infinity Award for The Silence
- 1997, Open Society Institute's Individual Project Fellowship: Hate Thy Brother
- 1997, Art Director's Club Award for NY Times Web site design: Bosnia: Uncertain Paths to Peace
- 1999, Alfred Eisenstaedt Awards: Eyewitness Photo and Journalistic Impact
- 2000, Alfred Eisenstaedt Awards: Journalistic Impact – Photo Essay, "Exile and Return", The New Yorker
- 2000, Overseas Press Club: 1999 Olivier Rebbot Award, "Exile and Return", The New Yorker
- 2000, Mosaique Programme Grant, "Difference/Indifference" Centre National de L'Audiovisuel, Luxembourg
- 2002, Brendan Gill Prize: Here is New York: a democracy of photographs exhibition
- 2002, Cornell Capa Award (International Center of Photography Infinity Awards): Here is New York: a democracy of photographs
- 2002, New York State Council on the Arts, Individual Artists Project Grant
- 2002, Pollock-Krasner Foundation Grant

== Collections ==
Presess' work is held in the following public collections:

- Art Institute of Chicago, Illinois
- Arts Council of Great Britain, London
- Bibliotheque Nationale, Paris
- First Bank of Minnesota
- Fogg Museum, Cambridge, Massachusetts
- Fondation Leitz, Rueil-Malmaison, France
- Fondation Nationale pour la Photographie, Paris
- Fotomuseum Winterthur, Zurich, Switzerland
- Galerie du Château d'Eau, Toulouse, France
- International Museum of Photography, Rochester, NY
- Getty Museum, Los Angeles, CA
- International Center of Photography, New York, NY
- Kiyosato Museum of Photographic Arts, Kiyosato, Japan
- Metropolitan Museum of Art, New York
- Minneapolis Institute of Art, Minnesota
- Musée d'Art Moderne de la Ville de Paris, Paris
- Musée de l'Élysée, Lausanne, Switzerland
- Museum of the Moving Image, New York
- Museum of Fine Arts, Houston, Texas
- Museum of Modern Art, New York, NY
- New York Historical Society New York, NY
- Philadelphia Museum of Art, Philadelphia, PA
- San Francisco Museum of Modern Art. San Francisco, CA
- Archive of Modern Conflict, London
- The Whitney Museum of American Art, New York, NY
- Victoria and Albert Museum, London

== General references ==
- Linfield, Susie. The Cruel Radiance: Photography and Political Violence. Chicago: The University of Chicago Press, 2010.
- Gilles Peress Biography, NYTimes.com
- Interview with Gilles Peress
- Magnum Photos Biography
