= Nick Waplington =

British photographer

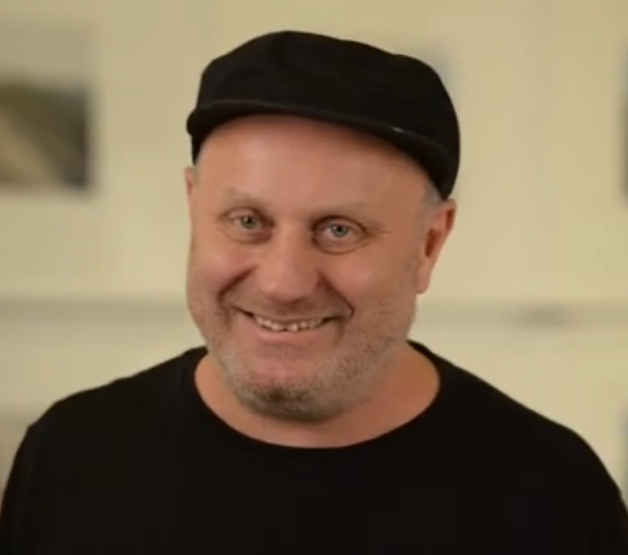
- In a Brooklyn Museum video in 2016
- Born: 1965 (age 60–61); Aden, Yemen
- Education: West Sussex College of Art & Design; Trent Polytechnic; Royal College of Art
- Occupation: Photographer

Nick Waplington (born 1965) is a British artist and photographer. Many books of Waplington's work have been published. His work has been shown in solo exhibitions at Tate Britain and The Photographers' Gallery in London, at Philadelphia Museum of Art in the USA, and at the National Museum of Photography, Film & Television in Bradford, UK; and in group exhibitions at Venice Biennale, Italy and Brooklyn Museum, New York City. In 1993, he was awarded an Infinity Award for Young Photographer by the International Center of Photography. His work is held in the permanent collections of the Solomon R. Guggenheim Museum in New York City, Victoria and Albert Museum and Government Art Collection in London, National Gallery of Australia, the Philadelphia Museum of Art, and Royal Library, Denmark.

== Early life and education ==
Waplington was born in Aden, Yemen. He traveled extensively during his childhood as his father worked as a scientist in the nuclear industry.

Waplington studied art at West Sussex College of Art & Design in Worthing; Trent Polytechnic in Nottingham; and the Royal College of Art in London.

== Career ==
From 1984, Waplington would regularly visit his grandfather on the Broxtowe Estate in Aspley, Nottingham, where he began to photograph his immediate surroundings. Friends and neighbours of his family became his subject matter of choice. He continued with this work on and off for the next 15 years and from it came two books (Living Room and Weddings, Parties, Anything) and numerous exhibitions.

In 2001, Waplington's work Learn How to Die the Easy Way (2002) was part of the group exhibition at the Venice Biennale 2001.

In 2003, Watlington collaborated with Miguel Calderon to create the graphic novel, Terry Painter.

From 2008-09, Waplington worked on a major book project with the fashion designer Alexander McQueen, called Working Process (2013). The title refers to both McQueen's working process as a fashion designer and Waplington's working process as an artist making photo books. In March 2015 this project became the first one-person exhibition by a British photographer in the main exhibition space at Tate Britain in London.

In 2011, Waplington self-published Lackadaisical, using a print on demand service, his response to increasingly expensive photobooks. It was later edited and expanded in the form of another edition called Extrapolations.

While continuing to make photographic works, since 2010, Waplington has devoted most of his time to his practice as a painter.

Waplington participated in the photography collective This Place, founded by Frédéric Brenner, contributing the book Settlement (2014), a study of Jewish settlers living in the West Bank, portrait and landscape photographs taken with a large format camera.

Waplington played the Wembley Photographer in the 2025 Josh-Safdie-directed movie Marty Supreme.

== Work ==
Waplington's 1994 book Other Edens focused on environmental concerns and, although it was conceived and worked on at the same time as Living Room, was seen as a major departure in style and content. This work is global in nature and its ideas are ambiguous and multi-layered.

Safety in Numbers (1997) is a study of the ecstasy drug culture in the mid-1990s.

The Indecisive Memento (1999) is a global road trip where the journey itself was the artwork (1999).

Truth or Consequences (2001) is a pictorial game based on the history of photography using the town of Truth or Consequences, New Mexico as a backdrop, inspired by the rules of the 1950s television show.

In You Love Life (2005) Waplington uses pictures taken over a 20-year period to construct an autobiographical narrative.

== Exhibitions ==
=== Solo exhibitions ===
Year	Title	Institution	Location	Ref
1990-1991	Living Room	The Photographers' Gallery	London	
1992	Living Room	Philadelphia Museum of Art	Philadelphia	
1992	Circles of Civilization	Philadelphia Museum of Art	Philadelphia	
1994-1995	Other Edens	The Photographers' Gallery	London	
1996	Weddings, Parties, Anything	National Museum of Photography, Film & Television	Bradford	
2007		Project space, Whitechapel Gallery	London	
2015	Working Process,	Tate Britain	London	

=== Group exhibitions ===
Year	Title	Institution	Location	Notes	Ref
1995	The Dead	National Museum of Photography, Film & Television		Curated by Val Williams and Greg Hobson	
2001		58th Venice Biennale	Venice		
2016	This Place	Brooklyn Museum	Brooklyn		
2017	A Handful of Dust	Le Bal	Paris		
2017	A Handful of Dust	Whitechapel Gallery	London	Curated by David Campany	

== Awards ==
- 1993: Infinity Award: Young Photographer, International Center of Photography, New York City

== Collections ==
Waplington's work is held in the following public collections:

- Gallery of Modern Art, Glasgow, UK
- Government Art Collection, London: 1 print
- Museum of Modern Art (MoMA), New York City
- Solomon R. Guggenheim Museum, New York City
- National Gallery of Australia, Canberra, Australia: 5 prints
- Philadelphia Museum of Art, Philadelphia, PA: 4 prints
- Royal Library, Denmark
- Science Museum Group, UK: 2 prints and a book (as of 24 October 2022)
- Victoria and Albert Museum, London: 14 pieces

== Publications ==
=== Books by Waplington ===
- Living Room.
  - Manchester: Cornerhouse, 1991.
  - New York: Aperture, 1991. ISBN 978-0893814816.
- Other Edens. New York: Aperture, 1994. ISBN 978-0893815875. Marianne Wiggins contributes an introduction.
- Weddings, Parties, Anything. Irvine Welsh contributes an essay.
  - Weddings, Parties, Anything. New York: Aperture, 1996. UK edition.
  - The Wedding. New York: Aperture, 1996. ISBN 978-0893816070. US edition.
- Safety in Numbers.
  - London: Booth Clibborn, 1997.
  - London: Booth Clibborn, 2002. ISBN 978-1861540966.
- The Indecisive Memento. London: Booth Clibborn, 1999. ISBN 978-1861541222.
- Truth or Consequences. London: Phaidon, 2001. ISBN 978-0714840543.
- Learn how to die the easy way. London: Trolley, 2002. ISBN 978-0954207977. Waplington's contribution to a group exhibition at Venice Biennale in 2001.
- Terry Painter. Self-published, 2003. Graphic novel, art directed, story and concept by Waplington and Miguel Calderon and illustration by Domingo & Celilia.
- You Love Life. London: Trolley, 2005. ISBN 978-1904563426.
- Double Dactyl. London: Trolley, 2008. ISBN 978-1904563679.
- Working Process. New York: Damiani, 2013. ISBN 978-88-6208-295-2.
- Surf Riot. New York: Little Big Man, 2011. Edition of 300 copies.
- Lackadaisical. New York: self-published, 2011. Edition of 100 copies.
  - Second expanded edition. New York: self-published, 2011. Edition of 100 copies.
- Extrapolations. New York: self-published, 2011. Edition of 100 copies.
- The Patriarch's Wardrobe. Melbourne: PAMBook, 2012. ISBN 978-0980369663.
- Settlement. London: Mack, 2014. ISBN 9781907946523.
- Made Glorious Summer. Tokyo: Powershovel, 2014. ISBN 978-4-9902101-7-5. 3 volumes and 1 insert. Edition of 500 copies.
- Living Room Work Prints. New York: Little Big Man, 2015. Edition of 700 copies.
- Cunt Away. London: Morel Books. ISBN 978-1907071485. Irvine Welsh contributes an essay. Edition of 200 Copies
- We Live As We Dream, Alone. London: Morel, 2016. Edition of 500 copies.
- Neither A Salt Spring Nor A Horse. New York: Pacific, 2018. Edition of 400 copies
- Hackney Riviera. Jesus Blue, 2019.
- The Search for a Superior Moral Justification for Selfishness. London: Morel, 2019.
- Anaglypta 1980–2020. Self-published / Jesus Blue, 2020. ISBN 978-1-8380354-9-5. Edition of 1000 copies.
- Comprehensive. Phaidon Press, 2023. ISBN 1838666214.

=== Zines by Waplington ===
- A Good Man's Grave Is His Sabbath. Deadbeat Club 32. Deadbeat Club/Little Big Man, 2015. Edition of 400 copies.
- Sesquipedalian. Geneva: Innen, 2017. Edition of 500 copies.
- Thomas Floored. Self Published: JesusBlue Books, 2020 Edition of 25 copies.
- SOMMAT. London & New York: JesusBlue Books / 1972, 2021. Edition of 650 copies.

=== Book paired with another ===
- Working Process. Bologna, Italy: Damiani, 2013. Edited by Alexander McQueen. ISBN 9788862082952. With a foreword by Susannah Frankel.
