= Park Jongwoo =

South Korean photographer (born 1958)

Park Jongwoo (박종우)
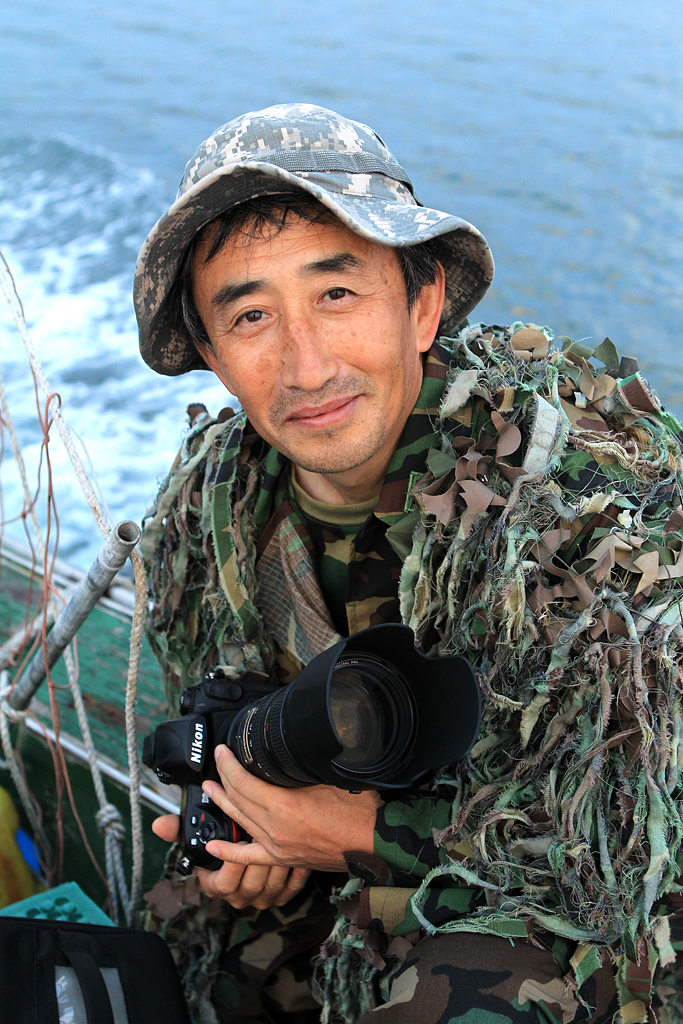
- Park Jongwoo in 2010
- Born: 1958 (age 67–68); Seoul, South Korea
- Occupations: Photographer, Documentary Filmmaker
- Known for: Documentary photography and video of the Korean Demilitarized Zone
- Website: https://parkjongwoo.com/

Park Jongwoo (박종우; born 1958) is a South Korean photographer and documentary filmmaker best known for documentary work on the Korean Demilitarized Zone (DMZ). He has also produced extensive documentary work in the Himalayas.

In 2009, Park received official permission from the South Korean Ministry of National Defense to photograph inside the DMZ, reportedly becoming the first civilian granted such access.

His photographs were exhibited in the Allied Museum in 2023. His DMZ photographs were published in DMZ: Demilitarized Zone of Korea (Steidl, 2017).

== Career ==
From 1983 to 1995, Park worked as a photojournalist for The Korea Times. After 1995, he worked as a stringer photographer for publications including The New York Times and the Los Angeles Times.

From 1995 onward, his independent projects focused on documenting vanishing cultures and minority communities, including a multi-decade body of work in the Himalayan region.

=== Himalayan work ===
Park’s Himalayan work began in the late 1980s and developed into a sustained documentary investigation of high-altitude communities and historic trade routes. In 1987, he participated in the production of the television documentary Trans-Himalaya, filmed across Pakistan, India, Nepal, and the Tibetan Plateau.

In the early 1990s, Park identified and documented sections of the Tea–Horse Road (Chamagodo), leading to a three-year project photographing and filming Tibetan and Kham regions. This work culminated in the television documentary Tibet Salt Valley’s Last Caravan, later released internationally as The Last Salt Caravan.

He has also worked on television productions including Mongolian Route (KBS-TV, 2001), The Last Capitalism (SBS-TV, 2012), and The Last Power (SBS-TV, 2013).

In 2009, Park published the photo book Himalaya: Twenty Year’s Odyssey and presented related exhibitions, including Himalayan Monograph at the Goeun Museum of Photography in Busan.

=== DMZ and military landscapes ===
In 2009, Park was commissioned by the South Korean Ministry of National Defense to document the DMZ in connection with commemorations of the sixtieth anniversary of the outbreak of the Korean War. His later work has also examined military landscapes and fortifications, including anti-tank obstacles commonly known as “dragon’s teeth,” photographed in Korea and parts of Europe.

== Exhibitions ==
His solo exhibitions include:

- Himalayan Monograph – Goeun Museum of Photography, Busan, Korea (2009).
- The Tea-Horse Road – Tokyo Canon Salon, Tokyo, Japan (2011).
- Asian Portraiture – Asian Cultural Centre, Gwangju, Korea (2016).
- On the Border – Yeongwol Museum of Photography, Yeongwol, Korea (2019).
- DMZ – Goeun Museum of Photography, Busan, Korea (2020).
- In the Shadow of the DMZ – Allied Museum, Berlin, Germany (2023).

== Awards ==
Park has received awards including the Korea Press Award (1994), the Steidl Book Award Asia (2017), and the 18th Donggang International Photo Award (2019).

== Publications ==
Park’s publications include:

- Himalayan Odyssey (Edition Zero Publishing, 2009).
- Imjin River (Noonbit Publishing, 2017).
- DMZ: Demilitarized Zone of Korea (Steidl, 2017).
