= Liquid Light =

Liquid Light, Inc.
- Type: Private
- Industry: Process technology to make chemicals from carbon dioxide
- Headquarters: Monmouth Junction, New Jersey, U.S.
- Key people: Dave Law, Chief Executive Officer; Emily Cole, Chief Science Officer & Co-founder; Dr. Andrew Bocarsly, Co-founder
- Website: www.llchemical.com

Liquid Light is a New Jersey–based company that develops and licenses electrochemical process technology to make chemicals from carbon dioxide (CO_{2}). The company has more than 100 patents and patent applications for the technology that can produce multiple chemicals such as ethylene glycol, propylene, isopropanol, methyl-methacrylate and acetic acid. Funding has been provided by VantagePoint Capital Partners, BP Ventures, Chrysalix Energy Venture Capital, Osage University Partners and Sustainable Conversion Ventures. Liquid Light's technology can be used to produce more than 60 chemicals, but its first targeted process is for the production of monoethylene glycol (MEG) which has a $27 billion annual market. MEG is used to make a wide range of consumer products including plastic bottles, antifreeze and polyester fiber.

== Company history ==
Liquid Light began operations in 2009 with seed capital from Redpoint Ventures after being co-founded by Kyle Teamey, Emily Cole, Andrew Bocarsly, Fouad Elnaggar and Nety Krishna. The company licensed technology developed by Bocarsly and Cole at Princeton University for electrochemical conversion of carbon dioxide to chemicals and subsequently began to develop additional technology for commercial implementation and to broaden the potential product offerings. After validating the technology at lab scale and beginning engineering scale-up, the company unveiled the first product, a process for making MEG, in March 2014 and subsequently won significant industry recognition including the CCEMC Grand Challenge, the CleanTech 100 Rising Star of the Year, and a #1 ranking in Biofuels Digest's 40 Hottest Smaller Companies in the Advanced Bioeconomy. The company closed a $15 million series B round of investment in September 2014 from investors including VantagePoint Capital Partners, Chrysalix Energy Venture Capital, Osage University Partners, Sustainable Conversion Ventures, and BP Ventures.

On January 10, 2017, Avantium announced its acquisition of Liquid Light for an undisclosed amount.

== Technology ==
Liquid Light's core technology is based on the principles of electrochemistry and electrochemical reduction of carbon dioxide. The process under development for production of MEG first converts carbon dioxide into a two carbon intermediate called oxalate or oxalic acid. Oxalate is then converted to MEG in separate process steps that have potentially lower costs of production than petroleum-based processes. Liquid Light has developed additional technology to make other products from oxalic acid including glycolic acid, glyoxylic acid, acetic acid, and ethanol.

== See also ==
Carbon dioxide
