= Rami Hyun =

Hyun Hyo-jae
- Known for: photographs of war veterans
- Website: https://projectsoldierkwv.imweb.me/

Hyun Hyo-jae (mainly known as Rami Hyun) is a South Korean photographer. He is mainly known for his Project Soldier, in which he has photographed Korean War veterans from 22 countries.
