= Josef Koudelka =

Czech–French photographer (born 1938)

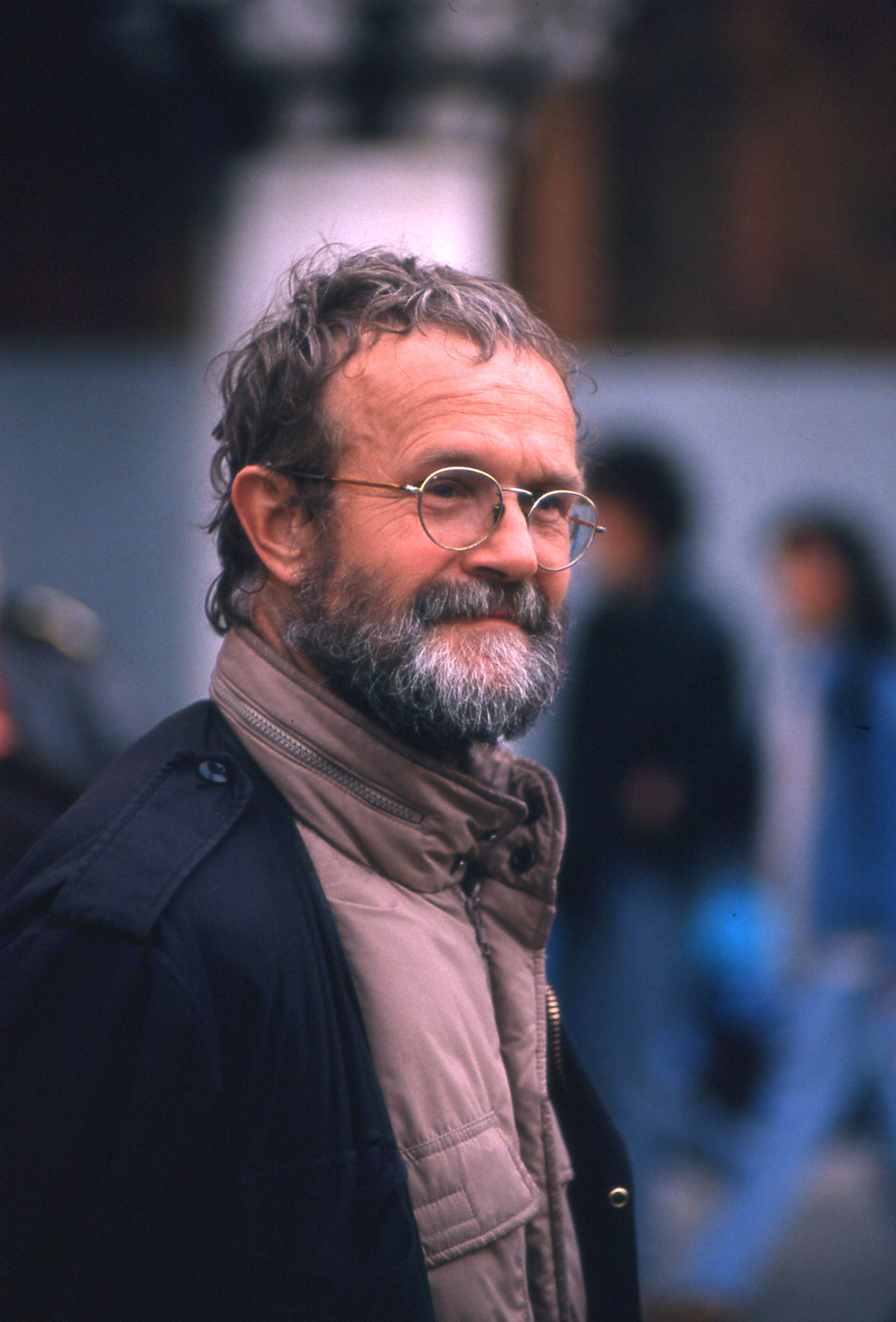
- Koudelka in Venice, Italy, 1986
- Born: 10 January 1938 (age 88); Boskovice, Czechoslovakia
- Citizenship: Czech; French
- Occupation: Photographer
- Known for: Street photography

Josef Koudelka (born 10 January 1938) is a Czech-French photographer. He is a member of Magnum Photos and has won awards such as the Prix Nadar (1978), a Grand Prix National de la Photographie (1989), a Grand Prix Henri Cartier-Bresson (1991), and the Hasselblad Foundation International Award in Photography (1992). Exhibitions of his work have been held at the Museum of Modern Art and the International Center of Photography, New York; the Hayward Gallery, London; the Stedelijk Museum Amsterdam; and the Palais de Tokyo, Paris.

== Biography ==
Koudelka was born in 1938 in the small Moravian town of Boskovice, Czechoslovakia. He began photographing his family and the surroundings with a 6×6 Bakelite camera. He studied at the Czech Technical University in Prague (ČVUT) in 1956, receiving a degree in engineering in 1961. He staged his first photographic exhibition the same year. Later he worked as an aeronautical engineer in Prague and Bratislava.

Koudelka began taking commissions from theatre magazines, and regularly photographed stage productions at Prague's Theatre Behind the Gate on a Rolleiflex camera. In 1967, he decided to give up his career in engineering for full-time work as a photographer.

Between 1962 and 1971, Koudelka travelled throughout Czechoslovakia and rural Romania, Hungary, France and Spain photographing Romani people. The Romani led a nomadic lifestyle and each summer Koudelka would travel for the project, "carrying a rucksack and a sleeping bag, sleeping in the open air, and living frugally".

He had returned from photographing Romani people in Romania just two days before the Soviet invasion, in August 1968. He witnessed and recorded the military forces of the Warsaw Pact as they invaded Prague and crushed reforms of the so-called Prague Spring. Some of Koudelka's negatives were smuggled out of Prague to the Magnum Photos agency, and published anonymously in The Sunday Times Magazine under the initials P. P. (Prague Photographer) for fear of reprisal to him and his family.

Koudelka's pictures of the events became dramatic international symbols, and came to be "recognised as one of the most powerful photojournalistic essays of the 20th century". In 1969 the "anonymous Czech photographer" was awarded the Overseas Press Club's Robert Capa Gold Medal for photographs requiring exceptional courage. Many of his photographs of these events were not seen until decades later.

With Magnum to recommend him to the British authorities, Koudelka applied for a three-month working visa and fled to England in 1970, where he applied for political asylum and stayed for more than a decade. In 1971 he joined Magnum as an Associate Member and became a Full Member in 1974. He continued to wander around Europe with his camera and little else.

Throughout the 1970s and 1980s, Koudelka sustained his work through numerous grants and awards, and continued to exhibit and publish major projects like Gypsies (1975) and Exiles (1988). Sean O'Hagan, writing in The Observer in 2011, described Gypsies as "a classic of documentary photography". Since 1986, he has worked with a panoramic camera and issued a compilation of these photographs in his book Chaos in 1999. Koudelka has had many other books of his work published, including in 2006 the retrospective volume Koudelka.

He and his work received support and acknowledgment from his friend the French photographer Henri Cartier-Bresson. He was also supported by the Czech art historian Anna Farova.

In 1987, Koudelka became a French citizen, and was able to return to Czechoslovakia for the first time, in 1990. He then produced Black Triangle, documenting the wasted landscape in the Podkrušnohoří region, the western tip of the Black Triangle's foothills of the Ore Mountains, located between Germany and the Czech Republic.

Koudelka lives in France and Prague and is continuing his work documenting the European landscape. He is the father of two daughters, one being Lucina Hartley Koudelka, and a son, Nicola Koudelka.

== Work ==
Koudelka's early work significantly shaped his later photography, and its emphasis on social and cultural rituals as well as death. He soon moved on to a more personal, in depth photographic study of the Gypsies of Slovakia, and later Romania. This work was exhibited in Prague in 1967. Throughout his career, Koudelka has been praised for his ability to capture the presence of the human spirit amidst dark landscapes. Desolation, waste, departure, despair and alienation are common themes in his work. His characters sometimes seem to come out of fairytales. Still, some see hope within his work – the endurance of human endeavor, in spite of its fragility. His later work focuses on the landscape removed of human subjects.

His most recent book, Wall: Israeli and Palestinian Landscapes, was published by Aperture Foundation in 2013. This book is composed of panoramic landscapes that he made between 2008 and 2012, as his project for the photography collective This Place, organized by photographer Frédéric Brenner. A documentary about Koudelka's work there, Koudelka Shooting Holy Land, was released in 2015.

== Publications ==
- Diskutujeme o morálce dneška. Czechoslovakia: Nakladatelství Politické Literatury, 1965.
- Kral Ubu: Rozbor inscenace Divadla Na Zábradlí v Praze (with Alfred Jarry). Czechoslovakia: Divadelní Ústav, 1966.
- Rozbor insenace Divadla Na zábradlí v Praze, 1966.
- Josef Koudelka, 1968.
- Gitans = Gypsies
  - Gitans: la fin du voyage. Paris: Delpire, 1975. ASIN B0014M0TV8.
  - Gypsies. New York: Aperture, 1975. ISBN 978-0-912334-74-5.
  - Gypsies. New York: Aperture, 2011. Revised and enlarged edition. ISBN 978-1-59711-177-5. With an essay by Will Guy.
  - Roma. Göttingen: Steidl, 2011. ISBN 978-3-86930-388-8. German language edition.
- Josef Koudelka: I Grandi Fotografi. Italy: Fabbri, 1982.
- Josef Koudelka. Photo Poche, Centre National de la Photographie, France, 1984.
- Josef Koudelka. Photographs by Josef Koudelka. Introduction by Bernard Cuau. Centre National de la Photographie, Paris, 1984.
- Exiles.
  - Paris: Centre National de la Photographie; Paris: Delpire; New York: Aperture; London: Thames & Hudson, 1988. ISBN 978-0-500-54208-8.
  - Revised edition. Paris: Delpire; New York: Aperture, 1997.
  - Revised and expanded edition. London: Thames & Hudson (ISBN 978-0-500-54441-9); New York: Aperture, 2014 (ISBN 978-1-59711-269-7). Essay by Czesław Miłosz. Commentary with Josef Koudelka and Robert Delpire.
- Josef Koudelka, Mission Photographique Transmanche. France: Différence, 1989.
- Animaux. France: Trois Cailloux/maison de la Culture d'Amiens, 1990.
- Prague 1968. France: Centre National de la Photographie, 1990.
- Josef Koudelka: Fotografie Divadlo za branou 1965–1970. Czech Republic: Divadlo za Branou II, 1993.
- Josef Koudelka. Photographs by Josef Koudelka. Hasselblad Center, 1993.
- Černý Trojúhelník – Podkrušnohoří : Fotografie 1990–1994 (The Black Triangle: The Foothills of the Ore Mountain). Czech Republic: Vesmír, 1994.
- Photopoche: Josef Koudleka. France: Cnp, 1997. ISBN 978-2-09-754114-7.
- Reconnaissance Wales. Cardiff, UK: Fotogallery/ National Museums and Galleries of Wales, 1998. ISBN 978-1-872771-45-8.
- Chaos. France: Nathan/Delpire; UK: Phaidon Press; Italy: Federico Motta Editore, 1999. ISBN 978-0-7148-4594-4.
- Lime Stone. France: La Martinière, 2001.
- Josef Koudelka. Czech Republic: Torst, 2002. ISBN 978-80-7215-166-0.
- Théâtre du Temps. France: Actes Sud. ISBN 978-2-7427-4435-0; (Teatro del Tempo), Italy: Peliti Associati; Greece: Apeiron, 2003.
- L'épreuve totalitaire. Paris: Delpire, 2004. With an essay by Jean-Pierre Montier.
- Koudelka: Camargue. France: Actes Sud, 2006. ISBN 978-2-7427-6174-6.
- Koudelka. France: Delpire; Italy: Contrasto; New York: Aperture; UK: Thames & Hudson; Germany: Braus; Spain: Lunwerg; Czech Republic: Fototorst, 2006.
- Joseph Koudelka Photofile. Thames & Hudson, 2007. ISBN 978-0-500-41083-7.
- Invasion 68: Prague. New York: Aperture. ISBN 978-1-59711-068-6; France: Tana. ISBN 978-2-84567-438-7, 2008.
- Koudelka Piedmont. Contrasto, 2010. ISBN 978-88-6965-217-2.
- Lime. Paris: Xavier Barral, 2012. ISBN 978-2-9151-7385-7.
- Wall. New York: Aperture, 2013. ISBN 978-1-5971-1241-3.

== Awards ==
- 1967: Award by Union of Czechoslovak Artists, Czechoslovakia
- 1969: Robert Capa Gold Medal Award, National Press Photographers Association, US, for his invasion photographs; the prize is dedicated to "an unknown Czech photographer"
- 1972: British Arts Council Grant to cover Kendal and Southend, UK
- 1973: British Arts Council Grant to cover Gypsy life in Britain, UK
- 1976: Arts Council of Great Britain grant to cover life in the British Isles, UK
- 1978 Prix Nadar, France
- 1980: National Endowment for the Arts Council, US
- 1987: Grand Prix National de la Photographie, French Ministry of Culture, France
- 1989: Grand Prix National de la Photographie.
- 1991: Grand Prix Henri Cartier-Bresson, France
- 1992: Hasselblad Award, Sweden
- 1998: The Royal Photographic Society's Centenary Medal and Honorary Fellowship (HonFRPS) in recognition of a sustained, significant contribution to the art of photography in 1998.
- 2004: Cornell Capa Infinity Award, International Center of Photography, New York City
- 2015: Dr. Erich Salomon Award

== Exhibitions ==
- 1961 – Divadlo Semafor, Prague
- 1967 – Josef Koudela: Cikáni – 1961–1966, Divadlo za branou, Prague
- 1968 – Josef Koudela: Divadelní fotografie – 1965–1968, Divadlo za branou, Prague
- 1975 – Josef Koudelka, Museum of Modern Art, New York
- 1977 – Gitans: la fin du voyage, Galerie Delpire, Paris; Kunsthaus Zürich, Zürich, Switzerland; The Tel-Aviv Museum, Israel; Victoria and Albert Museum, London.
- 1978 – Stedelijk Museum Amsterdam, Amsterdam, Netherlands
- 1984 – Josef Koudelka, Hayward Gallery, London. An exhibition of the Prague invasion pictures, crediting Koudelka for the first time.
- 1988/89 – Josef Koudelka, Centre national de la photographie, Palais de Tokyo, Paris; International Center of Photography, New York; Akademie der Künste, Berlin; Museum Folkwang, Essen, Germany; IVAM, Valencia, Spain.
- 1989 – Josef Koudelka, Mission Transmanche, CRP Galerie de l'Ancienne Poste, Douchy-les-Mines, France
- 1990 – Josef Koudelka z Fotografického dila 1958–1990, Umeleckoprumyslové museum, Prague
- 1994 – Černý trojúhelník – Podkrušnohoří : Fotografie 1990–1994 = The Black Triangle : the foothills of the Ore mountains, Salmovsky Palac, Prague
- 1995/97 – Periplanissis: following Ulysses' Gaze, Mylos, Thessaloniki, Greece; Zappeion, Athens; Centre culturel Una Volta, Bastia, France; ville de Rodez, France; Tokyo Metropolitan Museum of Photography, Tokyo; Museo di Storia della Fotografia, Fratelli Alinari, Firenze, Italy.
- 1998 – Reconnaissance: Wales, National Museum and Gallery of Wales, Cardiff, UK
- 1998 – From Behind the Iron Curtain, Lyttleton foyer, Royal National Theatre, London
- 1999/2001 – Chaos, Palazzo delle Esposizioni, Rome; Cantieri Culturali della Zisa, Palermo, Italy; Palazzo Marino alla Scala, Milan; The Snellman Hall, Helsinki; sala de exposiciones de Plaza de España, Madrid.
- 2002 – Josef Koudelka: Fotograf, National Gallery, Prague
- 2002/03 – Rétrospective, Rencontres d'Arles, Arles, France; Museo del Palacio de Bellas Artes, Mexico City; Museo de Arte Contemporáneo de Monterrey, Monterrey, Mexico.
- 2003 – Teatro del Tempo, Mercati di Traiano, Rome
- 2006 – Rencontres d'Arles, Arles, France: exhibition and laureate of the Discovery Award
- 2008
  - Screening at Théâtre antique d'Orange, Rencontres d'Arles, Arles, France
  - Prague 1968, Aperture Gallery, New York
  - Koudelka, Benaki Museum, Athens
  - Josef Koudelka, Pera Museum, İstanbul
  - Invaze = Invasion, Old Town Hall, Prague
- 2010 – Invasion Prague 68, Photo Cube Market Square, Guernsey
- 2011 – Invasion 68 Prague, The Lumiere Brothers Center for Photography, Moscow
- 2012 – Zingari, Fondazione Forma, Milan
- 2013 – Vestiges 1991–2012, Centre de la Vieille Charité, Marseilles, France
- 2013/2014 – Josef Koudelka Retrospective, The National Museum of Modern Art, Tokyo
- 2014/2015 – Josef Koudelka: Nationality Doubtful, Art Institute of Chicago, Chicago, Illinois; Getty Center, Los Angeles; Fundacion Mapfre, Madrid
- 2016/2017 – "Exiles | Wall" Netherlands Photo Museum
- 2018 – Josef Koudelka: Returning, Museum of Decorative Arts, Prague
- 2019 – Josef Koudelka: Exiles, Sofia City Art Gallery, Sofia

== Collections ==
Koudelka's work is held in the following permanent collections:

- Stedelijk Museum Amsterdam, Amsterdam, Netherlands

== See also ==
- Josef Sudek
