= Soi Park =

Soi Park is a Korean artist working in the photographic medium.

== Education ==
Park earned her B.A. in Visual Communication Design from Ewha Womans University. After several years of working as a junior art director at an advertising agency in Seoul, Park moved to the US and studied photography at State University of New York at Purchase. She received her Master of Fine Arts degree from Yale University School of Art in 2011.

== Career ==
Park's work has appeared in The New Yorker and was included in the ENGAGING ARTISTS (EA) program in 2015. Her preference to photograph human migration began while she was still at Yale, when she placed street advertisements with the phrase Buscar Trabajo. This work culminated in the monograph "Dear Home", which was exhibited at the CUE Art Foundation. For her series K-town, she explores her surroundings in Korea Town. Park would photograph Korean communities in Los Angeles and New York City named after towns in South Korea, then revisited the original sites of those place names. This work was combined with her community project titled "The Funeral Portrait: Young Jeong Sajin", which is a series of portraits crystallizing the complex facial expressions of over 200 Korean-American seniors. Park's recent project, which covers the interior space of a mosque built by members of a Muslim community who are living in Korea, is currently on view. Originally, Park's attempt to make the journey began when she encountered issues related to the Yemeni refugees in Jeju. While her project was yet abstract, Park has been seeking the meaning of borders and migration, which is intertwined with Islamic culture and life attached to Muslims through community service in Korea.

== Exhibitions ==
- 2020 Gyeonggi Creation Center Open Studio, organized by Choa Bang, Gyeonggi Cultural Foundation, South Korea
- 2020 0-person Perspective, curated by Choa Bang, Gyeonggi Creation Center, Gyeonggi Cultural Foundation, South Korea
- 2016-2017 HOME(WARD) curated by Lorissa Rinehart, Nathan Cummings Foundation, New York, New York
- 2016 AHL Visual Art Award Winner's Exhibition organized by Eun Young Choi, Art Mora, New York, New York
- 2016 The Funeral Portrait: Young Jeong Sajin, organized by Gina Fazio, Queens Library Flushing Branch, Queens, New York
- 2016 The Funeral Portrait: Young Jeong Sajin, organized by Carlos Chavez, The New York Public Library Seward Park Branch, New York, NY
- 2016 Engaging Artists, curated by Lorissa Rinehart, The Queens Museum, Queens, New York
- 2015 14th Dong Gang International Photo Festival curated by Suejin Shin, Dong Gang Museum of Photography, Gangwon, South Korea
- 2014 Faculty Biennial, curated by Heidi Leitzke, Main Gallery, Pennsylvania College of Art & Design, Lancaster, Pennsylvania
- 2013 Photographic Being, curated by Orestes Gonzalez, Jeffrey Leder Gallery, Long Island City, New York
- 2013 Soi Park: Dear Home, curated by An-My Lê, CUE Art Foundation, New York, New York
- 2011 Yale Photo MFA 2011, curated by John Pilson, Nicole Klagsbrun Gallery, New York, New York
- 2011 Chain Letter, curated by Camilo Alvarez Samsøn Project, Boston, Massachusetts
- 2011 MFA Thesis Show, Green Gallery, New Haven, Connecticut
- 2011 Art Chicago and NEXT_New Insight 2011, curated by Susanne Ghez, The Merchandise Mart Plaza, Chicago, Illinois
- 2010 Soi Park: Where Are We Going?, organized by Sam Messer, Aisling Gallery at THE STUDY, New Haven, Connecticut
- 2010 SPECTRA 2010, curated by Brian Paul Clamp, Silvermine Guild Arts Center, New Canaan, Connecticut
- 2010 Group show 37- TASCHEN, curated by Jon Feinstein, Humble Arts Foundation, New York, New York

== Awards ==
- Awarded the Wolhee Choe Memorial Award in 2016.
- Awarded the Engaging Artists Public Art Grant in 2015.
- Awarded the Alice Kimball English Traveling Fellowship in 2011.
