= Museum of Photography, Seoul =

Coordinates: 37.516571°N 127.1117693°E

The Museum of Photography, Seoul is a photography museum in Bangi-dong, Songpa District, Seoul, South Korea.

== See also ==
- List of museums in South Korea
