= Wendy Ewald =

American photographer and educator (born 1951)

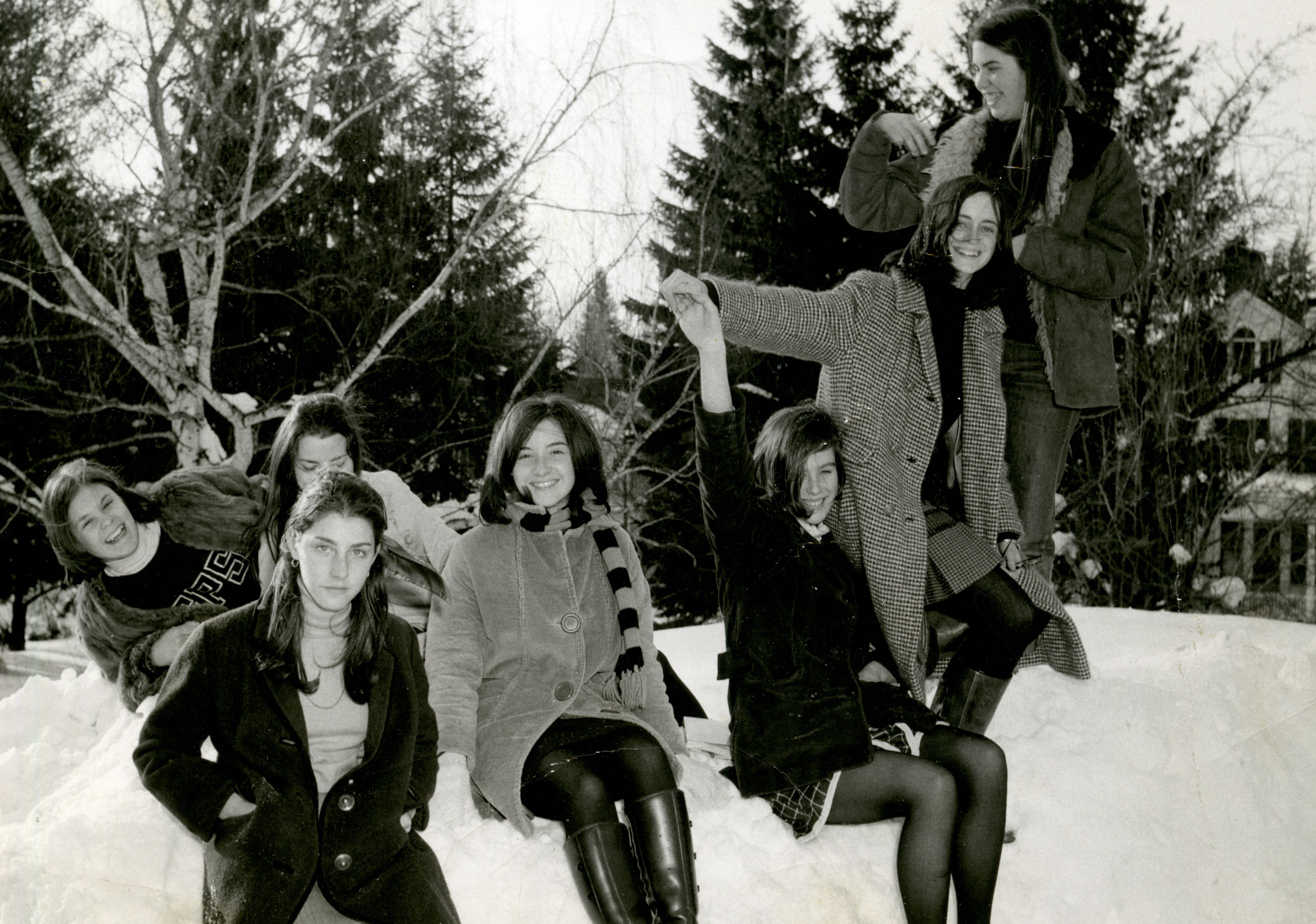
- Wendy Ewald and classmates in 1969
- Born: 1951 (age 74–75); Detroit, Michigan, United States
- Education: Antioch College; Massachusetts Institute of Technology
- Occupations: Photographer, professor at Duke University
- Spouse: Tom McDonough
- Website: wendyewald.com

Wendy Ewald (born 1951) is an American photographer and educator.

== Early life and education ==
Wendy Ewald was born in Detroit, Michigan, graduated from Abbot Academy in 1969 and attended Antioch College between 1969 and 1974, as well as the Massachusetts Institute of Technology, where she studied photography with Minor White.

== Photography career ==
She embarked on a career teaching photography to children and young people internationally. In 1969/1970, she taught photography to Innu and Mi'kmaq Native-American children in Canada. Between 1976 and 1980 she taught photography and film-making to students in Whitesburg, Kentucky, in association with Appalshop, a media co-op. In 1982, she traveled to Ráquira, Colombia, on a Fulbright fellowship working with children and community groups; spending a further two years in Gujarat, India.

Her work is directed toward "helping children to see" and using the "camera as a tool for expression". In recent years, Ewald has produced a number of conceptual installations—for example, in Margate, England, and in Amherst, Massachusetts—making use of large-scale photographic banners. Ewald was one of the founders of the Half Moon Photography Workshop in the East End of London; and in 1989 she created the "Literacy through Photography" programmes in Houston, Texas, and Durham, North Carolina.

She was senior research associate at the Center for International Studies at Duke University, visiting artist at Amherst College and director of the Literacy through Photography International program and artist in residence at the Duke University Center for International Studies.

In 2012, Ewald, along with Elizabeth Barret, was awarded a Guggenheim Fellowship for Creative Arts - Photography. For the Fellowship, they collaborated on a multimedia project called Portraits and Dreams: A Revisitation. The project is a sequel to Ewald's previous book, Portraits and Dreams. Published in 1985, this book is a collection of photographs and writings that focused on students Ewald taught in the Appalachian Mountains. Ewald re-engaged with the former students, now in their forties, to curate photographs, objects, and audiovisual material related to those years, as well as create new materials for their installation.

Ewald was invited to participate in the photography collective This Place, centered around Israel and the West Bank. For her project she distributed cameras to 14 different groups of people, gathered thousands of images, and selected 500. She gave cameras to owners of stalls and stores at the Mahane Yehuda marketplace in Jerusalem, Arab women and Romanis in Jerusalem's Old City, schoolchildren in Nazareth, residents of Hebron, Negev Bedouin and high-tech employees in Tel Aviv. This was Ewald's first attempt to document an entire country, and the first use of digital cameras and color photography in her international projects.

Throughout Ewald's career, she has had individual exhibitions at multiple galleries, including the International Center of Photography in New York City, the Fotomuseum Winterthur, Switzerland, the Corcoran Gallery of Art, and the Whitney Biennial in 1997.

Ewald is a visiting artist of photography at Bard College.

== Personal life ==
Ewald is married to Tom McDonough, a writer and cinematographer. They live in the Hudson Valley of New York with their son, Michael.

== Publications ==
- Appalachia: A Self-Portrait (Edited) Foreword by Robert Coles, Text by Loyal Jones, (Frankfort, KY: Gnomon Press for Appalshop, 1979)
- Appalachian Women: Three Generations (Whitesburg, KY: Appalshop, 1981)
- Retrato de un Pueblo (Bogotá, Colombia: Museo de Arte Moderno, 1983).
- Portraits and Dreams: Photographs and Stories by Children of the Appalachians, with an introduction by Robert Coles, afterword by Ben Lifson, (New York: Writers and Readers Publications, Inc., 1985)
  - Mack, 2020. ISBN 978-1-912339-89-1.
- Magic Eyes: Scenes from an Andean Girlhood from stories told by Alicia Ewald and María Vásquez, photographs by Wendy Ewald and children of Ráquira (Seattle, WA: Bay Press, 1992)
- I Dreamed I Had a Girl in My Pocket: The Story of an Indian Village with stories and photographs by the children of Vichya, India (New York: Doubletake Books and W.W.Norton,1996)
- Secret Games: Collaborative Works with Children 1969-1999 (Zurich; New York: Scalo, 2000)
- I Wanna Take Me A Picture: Teaching Photography and Writing To Children (Boston; Beacon Press, 2001)
- American Alphabets (Zurich; New York: Scalo, 2005)
- The Best Part of Me, Children talk about their bodies in pictures and words (Boston; New York; London: Little, Brown and Company, 2002) ISBN 978-0-316-70306-2
- In Peace and Harmony: Carver Portraits, Hand Workshop (Virginia: Visual Arts Center of Richmond, 2006)
- Towards A Promised Land (Göttingen: Steidl, 2006) ISBN 978-3-86521-287-0
- Who Am I In This Picture: Amherst College Portraits. Amherst: Amherst College Press. 2009. ISBN 978-0-943184-13-5.]
- American Alphabets (Scalo Verlag Ac, 2005) ISBN 978-3-90824-781-4
- This Is Where I Live (Mack) 2015 ISBN 978-1-910164-09-9
- America Border Culture Dreamer: The Young Adult Immigrant Experience from A to Z (Little Brown Books for Young Readers 2018), a Carter G. Woodson Book Award winner at the middle level for 2019

== Awards ==
- 1992: MacArthur Fellowship
- 2010: Visionary Woman Award from Moore College of Art & Design
- 2012: Guggenheim Fellowship for Creative Arts - Photography from the John Simon Guggenheim Memorial Foundation, with Elizabeth Barret, for Portraits and Dreams: A Revisitation

== Bibliography ==
- Thomas Frick, Wendy Ewald at Clarence Kennedy, Art in America (July 1986), 127, 129.
- Taylor Holliday, Children's photos at Whitney Biennial: 1997 Whitney Biennial exhibition features collaborative work by photographer Wendy Ewald and child photographers from around the world, The Wall Street Journal, Wednesday, March 14, 1997, A20.
- Charles Hagen, Wendy Ewald: exhibition of photographs at the James Danzinger Gallery, New York, New York, The New York Times, Friday, June 10, 1994, C18.
- Caitlin Kelly, Magic Eyes: Scenes from an Andean Childhood, The New York Times Book Review, Sunday, November 29, 1992.
- Barbara Mujica, Magic Eyes: Scenes from an Andean Girlhood, Americas, English Edition, vol. 45, no. 5 (September–October, 1993), 60–61.
