= List of Bard College people =

This is a list of notable people associated with Bard College in Annandale-on-Hudson, New York, United States. It includes graduates, attendees, and faculty of the college.

== Alumni ==
=== Arts ===
==== Dance ====
- Arthur Aviles, dancer and choreographer

==== Film, television and theatre ====
- Ashim Ahluwalia, filmmaker
- Raphael Bob-Waksberg, actor, producer, writer (BoJack Horseman)
- Anne Bogart, theater director
- Jordan Bridges, actor
- Salvador Carrasco, film director (The Other Conquest)
- Chevy Chase, comedian, writer, and television and film actor
- Joel and Ethan Coen, filmmakers
- Adam Conover, comedian, writer, and television host
- Gia Coppola, film director
- Pauline Chalamet, French-American actress
- Blythe Danner, actress
- Daisy Eagan, American actress
- Mia Farrow, actress
- Theodore J. Flicker, sculptor/film director
- Lola Glaudini, actor (The Sopranos)
- Griffin Gluck
- Wynne Greenwood
- Adrian Grenier, actor (Entourage)
- Christopher Guest, actor/director (This is Spinal Tap, Waiting for Guffman, Best in Show)
- Larry Hagman, actor
- K8 Hardy
- Todd Haynes, filmmaker
- Jonah Hill, actor
- Peter Hobbs, actor
- Gaby Hoffmann, actress
- Hellin Kay, filmmaker and photographer
- Lola Kirke, actress
- Howard Koch, screenwriter (Casablanca, Letter from an Unknown Woman)
- Annie Korzen, actress, comedian and writer
- Joshua Lutz, photographer
- Rhoda Levine, choreographer, theatre and opera director (NYC Opera), Play it By Ear, children's book writer
- Ezra Miller, actor
- Tracy Nelson, actress
- Olde English, sketch comedy group
- Ellen Parker, actress, the Guiding Light
- Jeff Preiss, filmmaker
- Rosalie Purvis, theater director
- Marianne Rendón, actress
- Peter Sarsgaard, actor
- Eric Schaeffer, writer, director, actor
- Jeff Scher, American filmmaker, animator and painter
- Peter Stone, playwright
- Michael Tolkin, filmmaker, novelist
- Lana Wachowski, film and television director, writer and producer
- Alexandra Wentworth, actor/comedian
- Yang Jin-mo, South Korean film editor
- Sherman Yellen, screenwriter/playwright/lyricist; political essayist for Huffington Post and The Environmentalist

==== Music ====
- Walter Becker, musician and co-founder of Steely Dan
- Ran Blake, pianist
- Knox Chandler, musician
- Frances Bean Cobain, musician and daughter of the late Kurt Cobain of Nirvana
- Carl Davis, composer and conductor
- Drop the Lime, electronic dance musician
- Donald Fagen, musician and co-founder of Steely Dan
- Ear, electronic music duo
- Joel Harrison, jazz guitarist, singer, composer, and arranger
- Jeanne Lee, jazz singer, poet and composer
- Jack Lewis, musician (known as "Lesser Lewis")
- Gilda Lyons, composer, vocalist, visual artist
- Soul Khan, hip-hop artist
- Michael Montes, composer
- Zeena Parkins, avant-garde harpist
- Steve Vibert Pouchie, Latin jazz vibraphonist
- PWR BTTM
- Elliott Sharp, musician
- Richard M. Sherman, songwriter and screenwriter
- Robert B. Sherman, songwriter and screenwriter
- Libby Titus, singer, songwriter and actor
- Told Slant
- Jonathan Tunick, composer and arranger
- Stefan Weisman, composer
- Bruce Wolosoff, composer
- Adam Yauch, musician, Beastie Boys
- Nick Zinner, musician (Yeah Yeah Yeahs, Head Wound City)

==== Visual arts ====
- Sadie Benning, video artist
- Cecilia Berkovic, artist
- Nayland Blake, artist
- Paul Chan, artist
- Ronald Chase, artist, director & educator
- Frances Bean Cobain, visual artist, model, and musician
- Adriana Farmiga, visual artist
- Daniel Gordon, artist
- Joanne Greenbaum, painter
- Duncan Hannah, painter and author
- David Horvitz, artist
- Tapu Javeri, photographer
- Jamie Livingston, photographer/cinematographer
- Mary Lum, visual artist
- Joshua Lutz, photographer
- Holly Lynton, photographer
- Malerie Marder, photographer
- Kambui Olujimi, visual artist
- Lothar Osterburg, printmaker and multimedia artist
- Lee Knox Ostertag, American cartoonist and writer
- Serkan Ozkaya, artist
- R.H. Quaytman, artist
- Herb Ritts, photographer
- Carolee Schneeman, artist
- Amy Sillman, painter
- Xaviera Simmons, artist
- Rudi Stern, multimedia artist
- Gordon Stevenson, multimedia artist
- Arthur Tress, photographer

==== Writing ====
- Jedediah Berry, writer
- Keith Botsford, author, editor, journalist, translator, composer
- Jesse Browner, novelist, essayist, translator
- Mary Caponegro, writer
- Phyllis Chesler, author
- Chris Claremont, comic book writer (X-Men)
- Cyrus Console, poet and essayist
- Rikki Ducornet, writer
- Andrew Durbin, novelist, editor
- J.F. Englert, author, poet, journalist
- Camonghne Felix, American writer and poet
- Louise Fitzhugh, author
- Daphne Gottlieb, poet, author
- Ken Grimwood, author
- Anthony Hecht, poet
- Pierre Joris, poet and translator
- Charlotte Mandell, literary translator
- Hal Niedzviecki, novelist
- Albert Jay Nock, author and theorist
- Daniel Pinkwater, children's author, humorist and NPR commentator
- Tad Richards, poet and novelist
- Thomas Rockwell, author, How to Eat Fried Worms, Shakespeare Scholar
- Elizabeth Royte, writer
- Mary Lee Settle, author, won National Book Award
- Rachel Sherman, author
- Juliana Spahr, poet and critic
- Wesley Updike, father of John Updike, inspiration for The Centaur
- Tessa Gräfin von Walderdorff, writer
- John Yau, poet, publisher

=== Business ===
- James Cox Chambers
- Asher Edelman, investment banker, served as the basis for the character Gordon Gekko in Wall Street due to his 1985 takeover of Datapoint
- Erika McEntarfer, head of the Bureau of Labor Statistics

=== Fashion ===
- Brandon Blackwood, fashion designer and philanthropist
- Tom Ford, fashion designer and filmmaker

=== Science ===
- Harvey Bialy, molecular biologist
- László Z. Bitó, scientist and novelist
- John Joseph Bittner, cancer geneticist
- Stephanie Chasteen, American physicist and science educator
- Matthew J. DeGennaro, American mosquito scientist
- Zoe R. Donaldson, American neuroscientist
- Tatiana Prowell, oncologist
- Ann Reid, biologist
- Elie A. Shneour, neurochemist, biophysicist and author
- Giga Zedania, academic and educational manager in the country of Georgia

=== Journalism ===
- Dylan Byers, media reporter
- David Cote, critic and writer
- John Curran, financial journalist
- Michael Deibert, author and journalist
- Mark Ebner, journalist and author
- Ronan Farrow, journalist and author, co-recipient of 2018 Pulitzer Prize for Public Service
- Tim Griffin, curator-in-chief of the Kitchen and editor-in-chief of ArtForum International
- Wafa Mustafa, Syrian journalist and activist
- Alexis Papahelas, journalist
- Jonathan Rosenbaum, film critic
- Richard Rovere, journalist, author
- Matt Taibbi, journalist (The Nation, The eXile, The NY Press, Rolling Stone)
- Lucian Wintrich, artist and White House correspondent for The Gateway Pundit in 2017

=== Other ===
- Loren AliKhan, judge of the United States District Court for the District of Columbia
- Sonita Alizadeh, Afghan rapper and activist
- Hannah Bronfman, American DJ, influencer, and entrepreneur
- Susan D'Agostino, American mathematician and science journalist
- Elio Fox, American poker player
- Bo Bo Nge, Burmese economist, vice governor of the Central Bank of Myanmar, and political prisoner
- Bruce Chilton, Biblical scholar
- Wayne L. Horvitz, labor mediator
- Tokata Iron Eyes, Native American activist
- Kalina Konstantinova, Bulgarian entrepreneur and politician
- Pamela Merritt, American writer and reproductive justice activist
- Sana Mustafa, Syrian refugee, author, activist and non-profit founder
- Andrew J. Nicholson, scholar of Asian religions
- Susan Playfair (1940–2021), stockbroker, designer, and author
- Gary Robinson, software engineer, graduated 1979, developed anti-spam algorithms
- David Rolf, president of SEIU Local 775
- Karen Saxe, mathematician
- Michael Sylvester (politician), American politician and member of the Maine House of Representatives
- Diya Vij, Commissioner of the New York City Department of Cultural Affairs

== Faculty ==
- Peggy Ahwesh
- Thurman Barker
- Jonathan Brent
- Franklin Bruno
- Ian Buruma
- Mary Caponegro
- Caleb Carr
- Anne Carson
- Bruce Chilton
- Teju Cole
- Mark Danner
- Moyra Davey
- Tim Davis
- Jeremy Denk
- Liz Deschenes
- Mitch Epstein
- Gidon Eshel
- John Esposito
- Barbara Ess
- Elizabeth Frank
- Neil Gaiman
- Kyle Gann
- Jackie Goss
- Diana Al-Hadid
- Benjamin Hale
- Ed Halter
- Michael Hudson
- Bill T. Jones
- Jeffrey Kahane
- Ani Kavafian
- Ida Kavafian
- Robert Kelly
- So Yong Kim
- Verlyn Klinkenborg
- David Krakauer
- Ann Lauterbach
- An-My Lê
- Gideon Lester
- Erica Lindsay
- Norman Manea
- Walter Russell Mead
- Edie Meidav
- Daniel Mendelsohn
- Peter N. Miller
- Bradford Morrow
- Salahuddin Mustafa Muhammad
- Vik Muniz
- Kamau Amu Patton
- Gilles Peress
- Judy Pfaff
- Francine Prose
- Kelly Reichardt
- Jennifer Ringo
- John Ryle
- Lucy Sante
- Peter Serkin
- Stephen Shore
- Amy Sillman
- Mona Simpson
- Alexander Soros
- Michael Specter
- Richard Teitelbaum
- Joan Tower
- George Tsontakis
- Dawn Upshaw
- Laura van den Berg
- Cecelia Watson
- Lawrence Weschler

== Former faculty ==
- Chinua Achebe
- Andre Aciman
- JoAnne Akalaitis
- Artine Artinian
- John Ashbery
- Alfred Jules Ayer
- Bruce Baillie
- Emily Barton
- Bernard Iddings Bell
- Saul Bellow
- Kenneth M. Bilby
- Heinrich Blücher (buried in the Bard Cemetery with his wife, Hannah Arendt)
- Benjamin Boretz
- James Clarke Chace
- Paul de Man
- Jacob Druckman
- Ralph Ellison
- Heinz Insu Fenkl
- Donald Finkel
- Harvey Fite
- William Gaddis
- Leah Gilliam
- Karen Greenberg
- Daron Hagen
- Felix Hirsch
- Bob Holman
- William Humphrey
- Peter Hutton
- Mat Johnson
- Joel Kovel
- Harvey J. Levin
- Roy Lichtenstein
- Ken Lum
- Mary McCarthy
- Allan McCollum
- Adolfas Mekas
- Franco Modigliani
- Toni Morrison
- Elizabeth Murray
- Jacob Neusner
- Albert Jay Nock
- Arthur Penn
- Orhan Pamuk
- Paul Ramirez Jonas
- David Rieff
- Roswell Rudd
- Mary Lee Settle
- Isaac Bashevis Singer
- Wadada Leo Smith
- Wilhelm Sollmann
- Joseph Somers
- William Weaver
- Ted Weiss
