= Joseph Somers =

Joseph Somers may refer to:

- Joseph Somers (artist)
- Joseph Somers (cyclist)

== See also ==
- SoMo (Joseph Anthony Somers-Morales), American singer and songwriter
