= Rift Valley Institute =

East Africa think tank

The Rift Valley Institute (RVI) is an independent, non-profit research and training organisation working with communities and institutions in Eastern Africa, including Sudan, South Sudan, the Horn of Africa, and the Great Lakes region. Established in 2001, the RVI has offices in Kenya, the US and the UK.

== Local knowledge, global information ==
The aim of the Institute is to bring local knowledge to bear on global information systems, advancing education, combating institutional amnesia, and modifying development practice.

== Action-oriented social research and advocacy ==
The RVI's core activities can be summed up as action-oriented education: field research and the dissemination of knowledge about Eastern Africa, within the region and beyond. The RVI's research projects are designed to record and preserve indigenous culture, support local research capacity, promote human rights and inform global advocacy efforts.

== Annual RVI courses ==
The RVI works with educational institutions across the region and runs several in-country training courses. In the summer of 2012, there were three primary courses, covering Sudan/South Sudan, the Horn of Africa and the Great Lakes. Each featured an intensive, week-long syllabus and was taught by both internationally recognized scholars and local experts. RVI courses emphasise the practical application of academic and technical knowledge to politics and development for local and expatriate aid workers, diplomats, peace-keepers, researchers and business people. An enlarged course schedule for 2013 will be announced in December 2012.

== A knowledge network ==
The Institute maintains an open-access digital library, the Sudan Open Archive of historical and contemporary books, documents and audio-visual media. The RVI's own website features free-to-download digital editions of the Institute's reports and publications, including The Sudan Handbook (2011).

== Senior staff, Fellows & Associates ==
The RVI's Executive Director is Professor John Ryle, who founded the Institute with Jok Madut Jok and Philip Winter. Fellows of the Institute are practitioners and academic specialists in the fields of human rights, history, anthropology, political science, economics, development, media, and law.

Hala al-Karib is a Sudanese fellow of the Rift Valley Institute and a member of the board of the Musawah organisation who try to ensure equality and justice in Muslim family laws.

== Funders ==
The RVI has received financial support from organisations including the Open Society Institute, the J.M. Kaplan Fund, the Sigrid Rausing Trust, the United States Institute of Peace, UNICEF, UNEP, and the UK Government Department for International Development (DFID). It has received donations from Small Voice (UK) and Times Newspapers and technical support from Compactive Digital Services (Budapest) and Halcrow Ltd (London).

== Partners ==
The Institute works in collaboration with other organisations including the University of Juba, Sudan, the Southern Sudan Commission for Census, Statistics and Evaluation, the International Rescue Committee, the Bahr-el-Ghazal Youth Association, Save The Children Fund (UK), Bard College (New York), the Royal African Society, the Royal Institute of International Affairs, the British Institute in Eastern Africa, Rumbek Senior Secondary School; the Shading Tree; the World Bank; and the Poetry Translation Centre at the School of Oriental and African Studies in London.

== See also ==
- Rift Valley Technical Training Institute
