= Hala al-Karib =

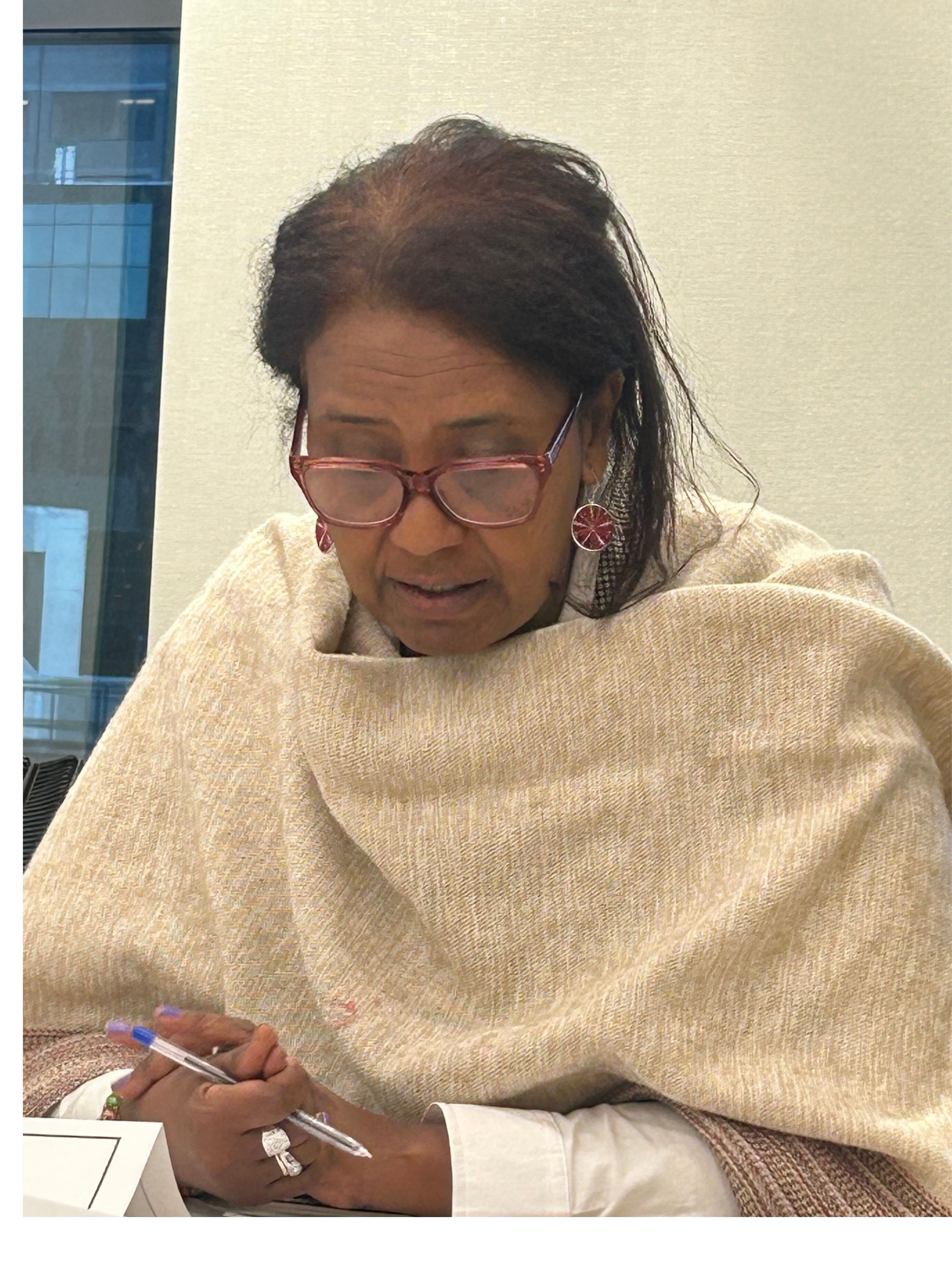
- Hala al-Karib moderating a panel at the UN Women Headquarters in New York City during the 69th Session of the Commission on the Status of Women in March 2025.
- Born: Sudan
- Employer: Strategic Initiative for Women in the Horn of Africa

Hala al-Karib or Hala Alkarib is a Sudanese activist against sexual violence in war. She is the regional director of the Strategic Initiative for Women in the Horn of Africa (SIHA).

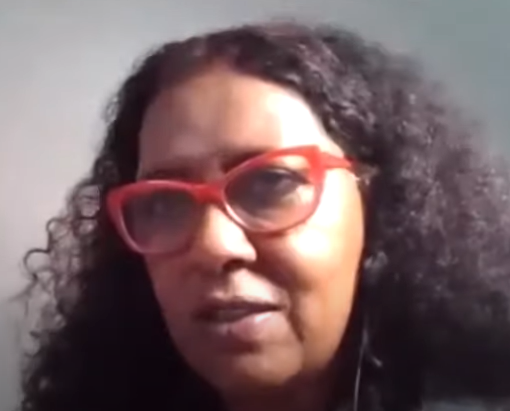
Hala al-Karib, pictured as a speaker for the United States Institute of Peace's discussion on "The Shocking Rise in Coups- Day1: Sudan and Mali"

== Life ==
Al-Karib was born in Sudan and her childhood was spent there and in Canada. Early in her career she worked in South Sudan at the University of Juba.

== Education ==
Hala Al Karib studied human rights, women's studies, and psychology; although we do not know where she carried out her studies, we do know that it led her to multiple research positions with universities across the world, such as Juba University in South Sudan and American University in Cairo, Egypt.

== Career ==
She works for the Strategic Initiative for Women in the Horn of Africa (SIHA) which combines the interests of 75 organisations to work in nine African countries to reduce the subordiation of women in the horn of Africa. SIHA was created in 1995 and al-Karib became its regional director and she is based in Uganda. SIHA publishes an annual journal "Women in Islam" and Al-Harib is the lead editor. The journal covers "gender relations and women’s rights within Muslim communities in the Great Horn of Africa.

== United Nations engagement ==
In 2021 the United Nations Security Council discussed the situation in Sudan. Al-Karib prepared a statement at their request summarising the civil situation. The Security Council met again in 2023 to discuss Sudan and al-Karib was again asked to prepare a statement. She has been involved in peace negotiations if only to point out that there are so few influential women involved that any outcome is unlikely to be even-handed.

== Advocacy for Women’s Participation in Peace Processes ==
Hala Al-Karib has been an outspoken advocate for increasing women’s participation in peace negotiations and protests across the Horn of Africa. In a United Nations Office to the African Union podcast discussion, she emphasized how women’s exclusion from formal peace tables limits the sustainability of peace agreements and undermines community-level recovery. She argued that women’s rights groups possess crucial knowledge on local conflict drivers, displacement, and grassroots security concerns, making their involvement fundamental to durable peace building efforts. Al-Karib also highlighted the need for structural reforms, including safer political environments and protection for women activists, to ensure that women can meaningfully influence negotiation spaces.

== Publications ==
Hala Al Karib is a researcher and an essayist with many publications that focus on women empowerment in Africa. She is the editorial head of “Women In Islam”, this is a journal that discusses women’s struggles in islamic societies such as rights, and gender equality. She often contributes opinion pieces to multiple magazines and outlets regarding female activism.

== International Engagement and Recognition ==
Al-Karib has also been profiled for her contributions to global feminist legal advocacy, including recognition by the ATLAS Women network, which highlights leading women in law and international justice. The profile describes her as a prominent voice defending women’s rights in conflict-affected societies and promoting legal reforms that confront gender-based violence, discriminatory laws, and state repression. Through her international engagements, she has advanced intersectional approaches to women’s rights that link local activism, regional organizing, and global accountability frameworks.

== Award and memberships ==
In 2024 her work was recognised when she joined the BBC's 100 inspiring Women. She is a fellow of the Rift Valley Institute and a member of the board of the Musawah organisation who try to ensure equality and justice in Muslim family laws.
