= Before the Flood (film) =

2016 documentary on climate change

- Theatrical release poster
- Directed by: Fisher Stevens
- Written by: Mark Monroe
- Produced by: Fisher Stevens; Leonardo DiCaprio; Jennifer Davisson; James Packer; Brett Ratner; Trevor Davidoski
- Narrated by: Leonardo DiCaprio
- Cinematography: Antonio Rossi
- Edited by: Brett Banks; Geoffrey Rickman; Abhay Sofsky; Ben Sozanski
- Music by: Gustavo Santaolalla; Trent Reznor; Atticus Ross; Mogwai
- Production companies: RatPac Documentary Films; Appian Way Productions; Insurgent Docs; Diamond Docs; Mandarin Film Productions
- Distributed by: National Geographic Documentary Films; Fox Searchlight Pictures (uncredited)
- Release date: October 21, 2016
- Running time: 96 minutes
- Country: United States
- Language: English

Before the Flood is a 2016 documentary film about climate change directed by Fisher Stevens. The film was produced as a collaboration between Stevens, Leonardo DiCaprio, James Packer, Brett Ratner, Trevor Davidoski, and Jennifer Davisson Killoran. Martin Scorsese is an executive producer.

The film covers effects of climate change in various regions of the world, and discusses climate change denial. Numerous public figures are interviewed in the documentary. To offset the carbon emissions of the production, the filmmakers paid a voluntary carbon tax. The soundtrack features compositions by Trent Reznor and Atticus Ross, Mogwai and Gustavo Santaolalla.

The film premiered at the Toronto International Film Festival in September 2016, and was released theatrically on October 21, before airing on the National Geographic Channel on October 30. As part of National Geographic's commitment to covering climate change, the documentary was made widely available and free of charge on various platforms. It received generally positive critical reviews.

== Background ==
At the European premiere in London in October 2016, DiCaprio introduced the film as follows:

Before The Flood is the product of an incredible three-year journey that took place with my co-creator and director Fisher Stevens. We went to every corner of the globe to document the devastating impacts of climate change and questioned humanity's ability to reverse what may be the most catastrophic problem mankind has ever faced. There was a lot to take in. All that we witnessed on this journey shows us that our world's climate is incredibly interconnected and that it is at urgent breaking point. ... We wanted to create a film that gave people a sense of urgency, that made them understand what particular things are going to solve this problem. We bring up the issue of a carbon tax, for example, which I haven't seen in a lot of documentaries. Basically, sway a capitalist economy to try to invest in renewables, to bring less money and subsidies out of oil companies. These are the things that are really going to make a massive difference. ... We need to use our vote ... We cannot afford to have political leaders out there that do not believe in modern science or the scientific method or empirical truths ... We cannot afford to waste time having people in power that choose to believe in the 2 percent of the scientific community that is basically bought off by lobbyists and oil companies.

== Content ==
The Garden of Earthly Delights

The film shows DiCaprio visiting various regions of the globe exploring the impact of global warming. As a narrator, DiCaprio comments these encounters as well as archive footages. DiCaprio repeatedly references a 15th-century triptych by Hieronymus Bosch, The Garden of Earthly Delights, which, he explains, hung above his crib as an infant, and which he uses as an analogy of the present course of the world toward potential ruin as depicted on its final panel. The film also documents, in part, the production of DiCaprio's 2015 film The Revenant.

DiCaprio's comments and inquiries focus extensively on climate change denial, mostly among corporate lobbyists and politicians of the United States.

The interview with British-born astronaut Piers Sellers, a NASA scientist who flew on three space missions, discusses his desire to publicize the perils of global warming in the short time he expected he had remaining to live, as he had stage IV pancreatic cancer as he was being filmed. He died on December 23, 2016.

== Cast ==
Along with DiCaprio, the documentary's subjects include Piers Sellers, Barack Obama, Pope Francis, Sunita Narain, Anote Tong, John Kerry, Elon Musk, Alejandro González Iñárritu, Johan Rockström, Greg Mankiw, Gidon Eshel, Farwiza Farhan, Ian Singleton, Lindsey Allen, Jeremy Jackson, Thomas Remengesau Jr., Alvin Lin, Ma Jun, Michael E. Mann, Philip Levine, Jason E. Box, Enric Sala, Michael Brune, and Ban Ki-Moon.

Subjects for the DVD's extra or deleted scenes include: Mark Z. Jacobson, Steven Chu, Andrew Baker, Ben Kirtman, and Sala. Topics include education, politics, coral, hurricanes, and urgency.

== Broadcast and streaming ==
The film was made available freely on the internet between October 30 and November 6, 2016, the run up to US Election Day, having aired on the National Geographic Channel in 171 countries and on some countries' national television channels. The film is subtitled in 45 languages, making it accessible for non-English audiences. The film had been viewed more than 2 million times on the day following its release. Within weeks, it had been viewed by more than 60 million people, making it arguably one of the most watched documentaries in history. As of November 2022, it is available for streaming on Disney+.

== Carbon tax ==
The film takes a closer look into the possibility of a carbon tax benefiting the American nation. In addition, they state that, "the carbon emissions from Before the Flood were offset through a voluntary carbon tax."

== Reception ==
=== Critical response ===
The film received mostly positive reviews from critics. On review aggregator Rotten Tomatoes, it has a 75% approval rating, based on 32 reviews with an average score of 7.0/10. The website's critics' consensus reads, "A fervent call to action where there is no time to waste, lest our future be left in the mud; Leonardo DiCaprio makes it his mission to deliver this urgent message Before the Flood." On Metacritic, it has a score of 63 out of 100, based on 10 critics, indicating "generally favorable" reviews.

Before the Flood was described as "surprisingly moving" in W and as "a heartfelt, decent, educational documentary about the most important issue of our time" by The Guardian.

Variety praised the fact that "given the sincerity of its message, its ability to assemble such a watchable and comprehensive account gives it an undeniable urgency," stating that "where the film succeeds the most is by focusing on the ground-level victims of climate change, whether the polar bears of the Arctic, or the inhabitants of island nations like Kiribati."

=== Accolades ===
Award	Date of ceremony	Category	Recipients	Result	Ref.
Evening Standard British Film Awards	December 8, 2016	Best Documentary	Before the Flood	Won	
Hollywood Film Awards	November 6, 2016	Hollywood Documentary Award	Leonardo DiCaprio and Fisher Stevens	Won	

== Soundtrack ==
The film's soundtrack was written and performed by Mogwai, Trent Reznor, Atticus Ross, and Gustavo Santaolalla.

== See also ==
- Don't Look Up
