= Enric Sala =

Spanish marine biologist (born 1968)

- Born: November 26, 1968 (age 57); Girona, Catalonia, Spain
- Education: Ph.D. University of Aix-Marseille II, France, 1996; B.Sc. University of Barcelona, 1991
- Scientific career
- Fields: Marine ecology Ocean conservation Media
- Workplaces: National Geographic

Enric Sala (born November 26, 1968) is a marine ecologist, author, and conservationist. He is known for his work in ocean conservation and his leadership of National Geographic Society Pristine Seas initiative.

== Early life and education ==
Sala was born in Girona, Catalonia, Spain on November 26, 1968. He grew up watching Jacques Cousteau's shows and dreamt of being a diver on the Cousteau's boat, the Calypso. He earned a B.Sc. in biology from the University of Barcelona in 1991 and received a Ph.D. in ecology from the Aix-Marseille University in 1996.

== Career ==
Following his academic studies, Sala was a professor at Scripps Institution of Oceanography in La Jolla, California.

In 2006, Sala moved back to Spain to take on a newly created post as a marine conservation ecology researcher at the Spanish National Council for Scientific Research (CSIC). Sala eventually left academia, citing that he was "tired of writing the obituary of ocean life."

=== Pristine Seas ===
In 2008, Sala launched the Pristine Seas initiative with National Geographic Society, a project designed to document and advocate for the protection of marine environments. In 2011, he and filmmaker James Cameron were named National Geographic Explorers in Residence.

Pristine Seas has produced over 200 peer-reviewed scientific publications and 30 documentary films to inspire governments and the public to take action. As of 2026, the project had conducted over 50 expeditions and has contributed to the establishment of 31 marine protected areas covering more than 6.9 million square kilometers.

=== 30x30 ===
Sala was one of the principal architects of the 30x30 movement to protect 30% of the land and sea by 2030. He was the lead author of a study published in Nature in 2021 that made the case for conserving the ocean for the benefit of biodiversity, food supply, and the climate. At the UN Biodiversity Conference in 2022, UN member states adopted the 30x30 target as part of the Kunming-Montreal Global Biodiversity Framework. In 2025, he co-authored a study published in Marine Policy that outlined the pathway to protect 30% of the ocean by 2030.

=== Writing and film work ===
In 2020, Sala published The Nature of Nature: Why We Need the Wild, a combination of memoir and science writing that makes the case for ocean conservation and tells the story of his transition from academia to advocacy.

Sala has served as a producer on dozens of films about the ocean. The 2020 National Geographic Pristine Seas film The Last Ice won an Emmy Award for Outstanding Nature Documentary. Sala is also an executive producer and science advisor of Ocean with David Attenborough, a full-length feature film that released in May 2025. Ocean with David Attenborough won two Emmy Awards, for Outstanding Cinematography for a Nonfiction Program and Outstanding Sound Editing for a Nonfiction or Reality Program.

=== Scientific Research ===
Sala's research interests include marine ecology, specifically the study of human impact on ocean health and the effectiveness of no-take marine reserves.

Notable findings from his research include:

- 2008 – Contributions to the identification of inverted biomass pyramids in coral reef ecosystems.
- 2018 – Research on the economic viability of high-seas fishing, which concluded that a significant portion of current activity is dependent on government subsidies.
- 2021 – Lead author on an international study identifying priority areas in the global ocean for the preservation of biodiversity, food, and climate regulation.

== Filmography ==
- 2009 – Journey to Shark Eden (National Geographic Channel, 2009)
- 2010 – Shark Island (NatGeo Wild, 2010)
- 2011 – Secrets of the Mediterranean: Cousteau's Lost World (NatGeo Wild, 2011)
- 2012 – Lost Sharks of Easter Island (NatGeo Wild, 2012)
- 2013 – Sharks of Lost Island (NatGeo Wild, 2013)
- 2013 – Wild Gabon (NatGeo Wild, 2013)
- 2014 – Africa's Wild Coast (NatGeo Wild, 2014)
- 2015 – Russia's Far North (NatGeo Wild, 2015)
- 2016 – Inn Saei (Hrund Gunnsteinsdottir, 2016)
- 2016 – Palau: Pristine Paradise (NatGeo Wild, 2016)
- 2016 – Wild Galapagos: Pristine Seas (NatGeo Wild, 2016)
- 2016 – Before the Flood (Fisher Stevens, 2016)
- 2017 – Cape Horn: The sea at the end of the world (National Geographic Channel International, 2017)
- 2017 – Juan Fernández: The sea forever (National Geographic Channel International, 2017)
- 2017 – Revillagigedo: Mexico's wildest seas (2017)
- 2020 – The Last Ice (Disney+, 2020) — Emmy Award Winner for Outstanding Nature Documentary (2021)
- 2025 – Ocean with David Attenborough (Disney+, 2025) — Executive Producer and Scientific Advisor

== Publications ==
Sala has authored over 150 publications; a selection is listed here.

- Jackson, Jeremy B.C., Alexander, Karen E., Sala, Enric (2011). Shifting Baselines: The Past and Future of Ocean Fisheries. Island Press.
- Sala, Enric (2015). Pristine Seas: Journeys to the Ocean's Last Wild Places. National Geographic.
- Sala, Enric (2020). The Nature of Nature. National Geographic.
