= John Ryle (anthropologist) =

British writer and anthropologist

John Rowland Ryle OBE
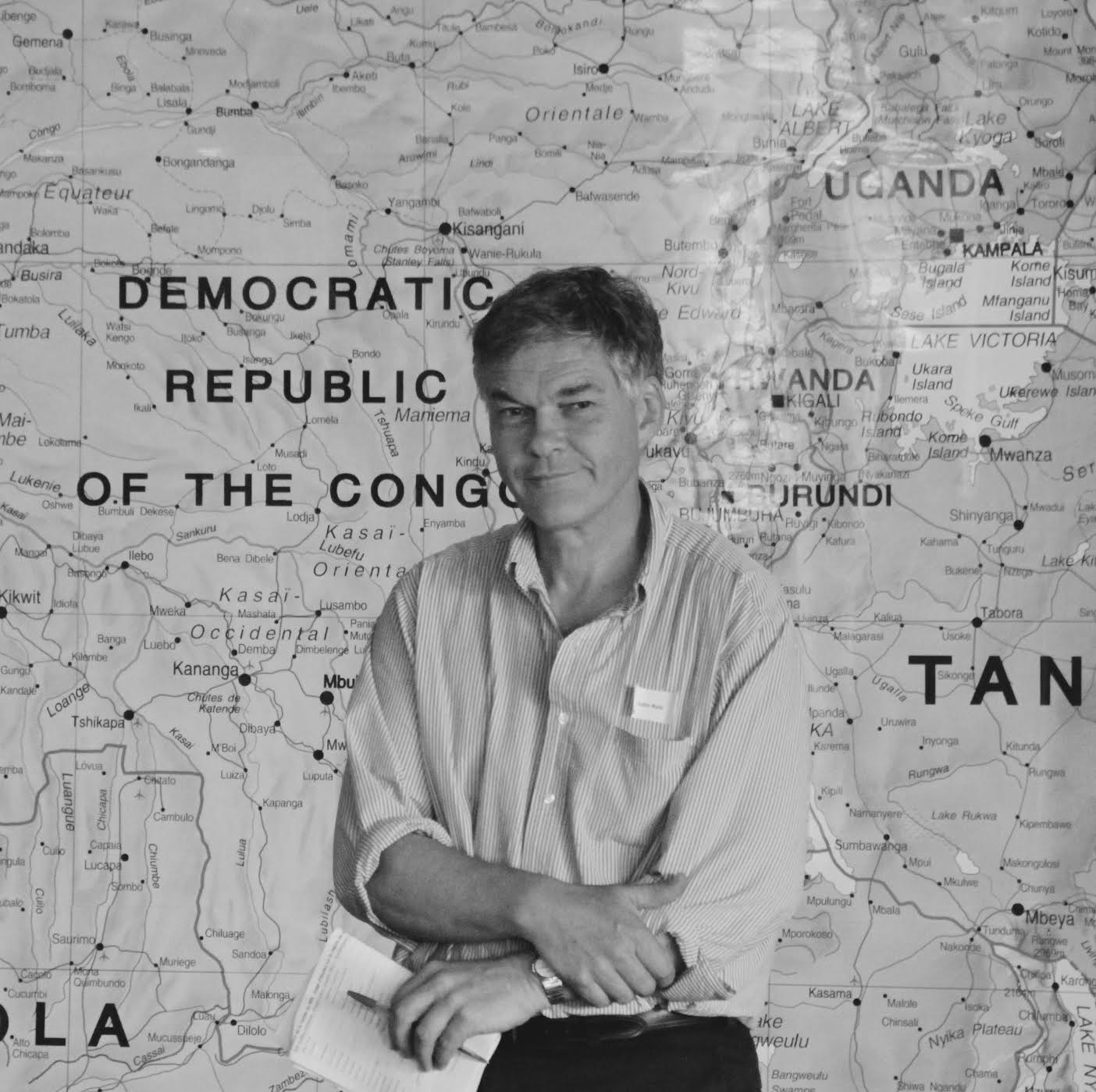
- John Ryle teaching on Rift Valley Institute Sudans Course
- Born: Shrewsbury, Shropshire, United Kingdom
- Occupations: Writer, anthropologist, film-maker, editor
- Writing career
- Genres: Ethnography, reportage, essays, literary criticism
- Subjects: Eastern Africa, Brazil, Human Rights, Religion, Visual Arts, Music and Literature
- Website: johnryle.com

John Rowland Ryle OBE is a British writer, anthropologist, social activist, filmmaker, teacher and publisher, with an interest in the history and culture of Eastern Africa. He is co-founder of the Rift Valley Institute, and Legrand Ramsey Professor of Anthropology at Bard College, New York.

== Background ==
His father, John Creagh Ryle, a medical doctor and alpinist, was a general practitioner in Shrewsbury, Shropshire, where Ryle was born. His mother, Melody Ryle, née Jackson, was a stalwart of the local Family Planning Association and a noted amateur botanist and gardener. Ryle is a grandson of the pioneer of social medicine John Alfred Ryle, a nephew of the astronomer Sir Martin Ryle, a great-nephew of the philosopher Gilbert Ryle, and a great-great grandson of John Charles Ryle, evangelical Bishop of Liverpool in the last decades of the nineteenth century.

== Life and work ==
Ryle was educated at Shrewsbury School and Oxford University, where he graduated in English Language and Literature. He pursued postgraduate studies in social anthropology, conducting fieldwork among the Agar Dinka communities in today's South Sudan. In 1975 he became an assistant editor at The Times Literary Supplement. During the printers' strike at Times Newspapers, he founded, with Richard Boston, the acclaimed but short-lived periodical Quarto (1978–1981). From 1982 to 1986 he worked for the Sunday Times in London as Deputy Literary Editor and, subsequently, as a feature writer. He has written for the London Review of Books, the New York Review of Books, the New Yorker, the Los Angeles Times and various scholarly periodicals, and is a contributing editor of Granta.

Ryle also worked as a doorman at the Embassy Club in Bond Street, London, as a roustabout for the Royal American Shows and the Canadian Pacific Railway, as ghost-writer of Mick Jagger's unpublished autobiography, and as a travel writer.

In the late 1980s, Ryle was a project officer at the Ford Foundation in Brazil and lived in an Afro-Brazilian community in Salvador da Bahia. In the 1990s, he worked as a consultant to relief and development organisations in Sudan and the Horn of Africa, including Save the Children Fund (UK). His weekly newspaper column, "City of Words", appeared in The Guardian from 1995 to 1999. From 1996 to 1997, he was a research fellow of Nuffield College, Oxford. In the 1990s he became an activist in the International Campaign to Ban Landmines.

From 2001 to 2017, Ryle was successively chair and executive director of the Rift Valley Institute, a research and public information organisation operating in Eastern Africa that he founded with Jok Madut Jok and Philip Winter. He was a member of the International Eminent Persons Group, reporting on slavery and abduction in Sudan. Since 2007, he has been Legrand Ramsey Professor of Anthropology at Bard College, a liberal arts college in New York state. He has been a board member of the Human Rights Watch Africa Division, the Media Development Investment Fund and the scholarly journal African Affairs.

In 2022 he established a publishing company, City of Words, concentrating on works of reportage, life-writing and general non-fiction.

Ryle was appointed an Officer of the Order of the British Empire (OBE) in the Queen's 2021 Birthday Honours for services to research and education in Sudan, South Sudan and the Horn of Africa.

== Selected bibliography ==
=== Books ===
- Ryle, John; Willis, Justin; Baldo, Suliman; Madut Jok, Jok, eds. (2012). The Sudan Handbook (digital ed.). London: Rift Valley Institute. ISBN 978-1847010308.
- Warriors of the White Nile: the Dinka (Time-Life Books, 1982) with Sarah Errington ISBN 978-0-7054-0700-7

=== Technical reports and academic research ===
- Local Peace Processes in Sudan: A Baseline Study (2006), with Mark Bradbury, Kwesi Sansculotte-Greenidge, Michael Medley
- Register of Persons Abducted from Northern Bahr-el-Ghazal, Sudan, 1983–2002 (2004/2005), with Jok Madut Jok, Fergus Boyle, Brown Kanyangi Budambula
- Slavery, Abduction and Forced Servitude in Sudan: Report of the International Eminent Persons Group (2002)
- Report of an Investigation into Oil Development, Conflict and Displacement in Western Upper Nile, Sudan (2001), with Georgette Gagnon

=== Essays, reporting and other contributions ===
- "Remembering Paul Robeson" (2018), The New York Review of Books
- "The Nuba" (2008), Granta, with Jack Picone
- "The Many Voices of Africa" (2006), Granta
- "Disaster in Darfur" (2004), The New York Review of Books
- "Translating Caetano" (2002) Granta
- "At Play in the Bush of Ghosts: Tropical baroque, African reality and the writings of Ryszard Kapuscinski" (2001), The Times Literary Supplement
- "Burying the Emperor" (2001), Granta
- "Children at War" (2000), The New York Review of Books
- "The Hazards of Reporting Complex Emergencies in Africa" (2000), Transnational Law & Contemporary Problems
- "Children in Arms" (1999), The New York Review of Books
- "Zero Grazing" (1992), London Review of Books
- "The Road to Abyei" (1992), Worst journeys: The Picador book of travel ISBN 978-0-3303-2140-2
- "Kiss and tell" (1990), London Review of Books
- "Miracles of the people: attitudes to Catholicism in an Afro-Brazilian religious centre in Salvador da Bahia" (1988), Vernacular Christianity: essays in the social anthropology of religion presented to Godfrey Lienhardt

=== Translations ===
- Virginia Rodrigues: Afro-Sambas, Deutsche Grammophon (2003)
- Caetano Veloso: Noites do Norte (2001)

== Film and video ==
- The Price of Survival (1994) Bright Star Productions (cameraman & co-director, with Bapiny Tim Chol)
- Witchcraft among the Azande (1982) Granada TV Disappearing World (anthropologist)
