= Planeat =

- Directed by: Or Shlomi; Shelley Lee Davies
- Written by: Or Shlomi; Shelley Lee Davies
- Produced by: Or Shlomi; Shelley Lee Davies; Christopher Hird
- Starring: T. Colin Campbell; Caldwell Esselstyn; Gidon Eshel; Peter Singer
- Cinematography: Or Shlomi; Amiram Bukowski
- Edited by: Or Shlomi
- Music by: Ernie Wood
- Distributed by: Studio At 58
- Release dates: 25 April 2010 (Newport Beach Film Festival); 20 May 2011 (United Kingdom)
- Running time: 72 minutes
- Country: United Kingdom
- Language: English

Planeat is a 2010 British documentary film by Or Shlomi and Shelley Lee Davies. The film discusses the possible nutritional and environmental benefits of adopting a whole foods, plant-based diet based on the research of T. Colin Campbell, Caldwell Esselstyn and Gidon Eshel. The film also features the views of Peter Singer.

According to Shelley Lee Davies, the film purposely does not cover any purported animal rights arguments (as opposed to animal welfare) for adopting a plant-based (vegan) diet, but concentrates on the health and environmental reasons instead.

Planeat premiered at the 2010 Newport Beach Film Festival. It released theatrically in the United States in April 2011 and the United Kingdom in May 2011. The film was privately screened by the film's directors and Willie Bain MP at Somerset House in March 2011 and in the House of Commons in May 2011.

== Critical reception ==
Jamie Russell of Total Film gave it 4 stars out of 5 and called it “Punchy and inspirational” and "Forceful stuff, though we can take or leave the kale sandwiches."

Jennie Kermode of Eye For Film gave it 4 stars out of 5 and praised the cinematography “For fans of cookery programmes it is likely to be love at first sight. Bright, crisp cinematography perfectly captures a dazzling array of beautifully prepared foods which one can almost smell”

Cath Clarke of The Guardian gave the movie 2 stars out of 5 and, speaking as a vegetarian convert, speculated on her reasons for disliking the film: "Maybe it's the tippy-toe, softly-softly tone, sprinkling inspiration between the science, with visits to boutique organic farms and kooky vegan cupcake bakeries. Possibly it ought to come with a warning: contains traces of smugness."

Charlotte O'Sullivan of the London Evening Standard writes, "PlanEat is on a serious mission but its lack of focus is infectious. My big question as the credits rolled: why are so many vegan chefs covered in tattoos?"

Christopher Long of Movie Metropolis gave the movie a 5 out of 10 saying, "a movie by true believers for true believers, and I am not one."

Awards and Festivals The Jury Selection, UK Green Film Festival Award FICMA, Barcelona International Environmental Film Festival London International Documentary Film Festival Newport Beach Film Festival Environmental Film Festival in the Nation's Capital European Documentary Film Festival Melbourne Environmental Film Festival Slow Motion Food Film Festival, Nova Scotia Tutti Nello Stesso Piatto Festival, Italy Ecocup Moscow Film Festival Do Something Reel Film Festival Raindance Film Festival Oneonta Film Festival Cinema Verde Environmental Film and Arts Festival

== See also ==
- List of vegan and plant-based media
