= Holly Lynton =

American photographer

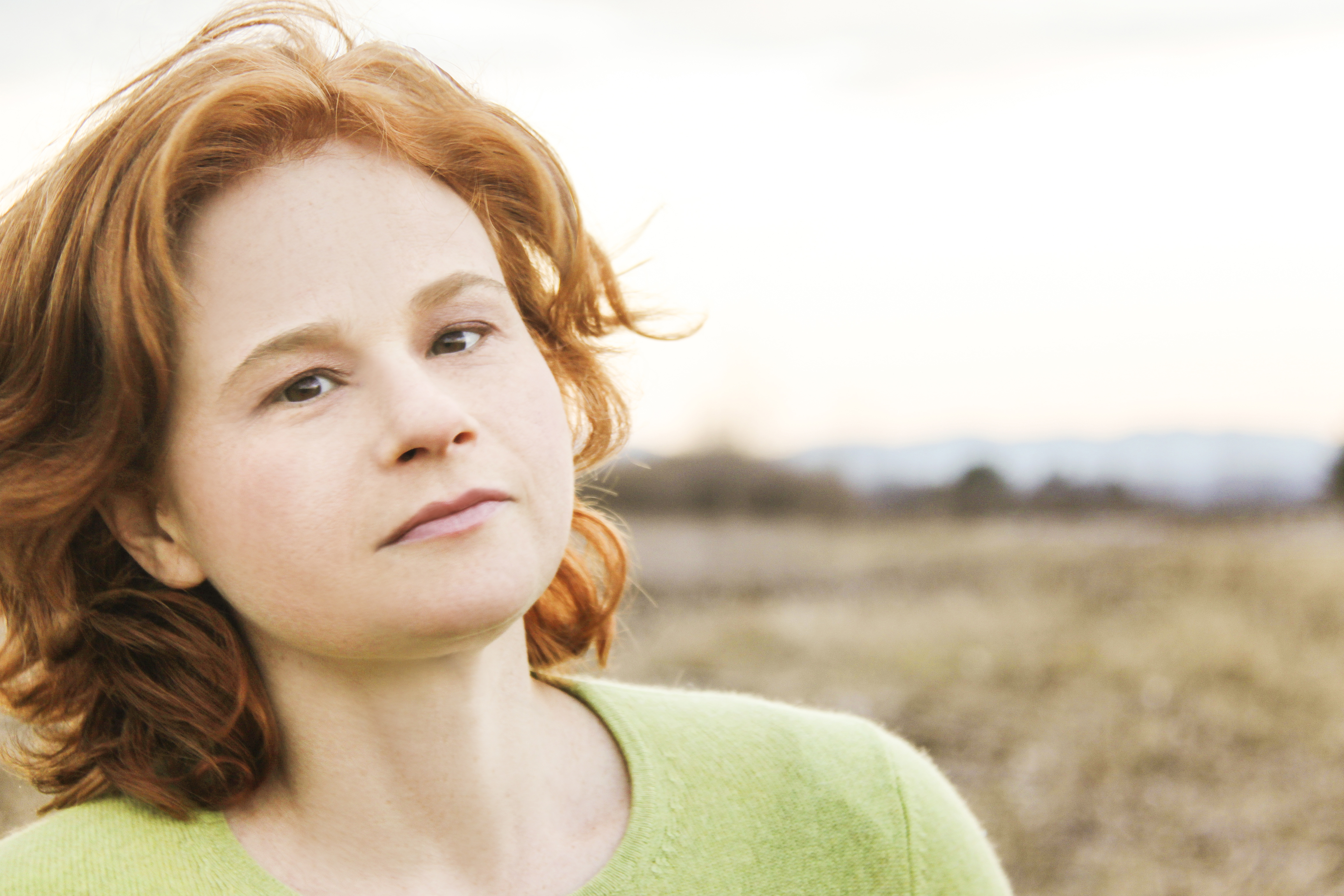
- Born: 1972 (age 53–54); Boulder, Colorado, U.S.
- Education: BA, Yale University; MFA, Bard College
- Known for: Photography
- Notable work: Bare Handed

Holly Lynton (born 1972) is an American photographer based in Massachusetts. Her portraits of modern rural communities and agrarian laborers in America have been exhibited both nationally and abroad.

== Early life and education ==
Born in Boulder, Colorado in 1972, Lynton attended Yale University, where she majored in psychology and studied photography under Lois Conner and Tod Papageorge. After graduating with a BA in Psychology in 1994, Lynton went on to receive an MFA in Photography from Milton Avery Graduate School of the Arts at Bard College in 2000.

== Career ==
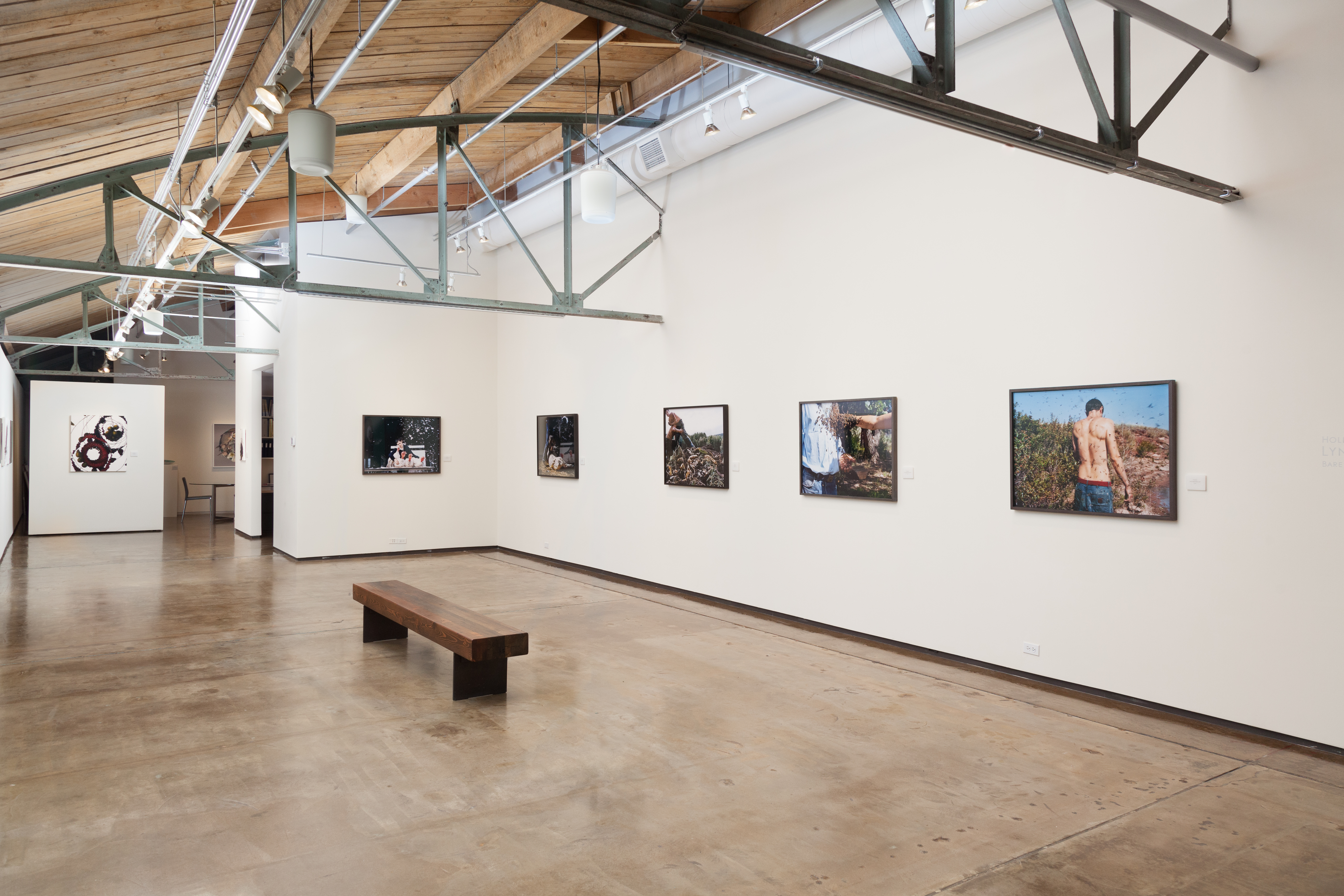
Holly Lynton's Bare Handed on exhibition at Goodwin Fine Art, Denver in 2015

Lynton's work has explored themes concerning human relationships, religion/spirituality, and natural environments, while her aesthetic has been described as evoking a dream-like perspective. In 2000, her first solo exhibition In Between was presented by the Kathryn Markel Fine Arts Gallery in New York City; the series depicts fragmented images that together form a visual narrative of Lynton, her husband, and an older man engaging in child-like play outdoors amidst the tension of ambiguous relationships.

Since then, Lynton's photographs have been exhibited both nationally and internationally and can be found in the collections of the Lowe Art Museum at the University of Miami, the Center for Creative Photography at the University of Arizona, The Fidelity Collection, and the Yale University Art Gallery.

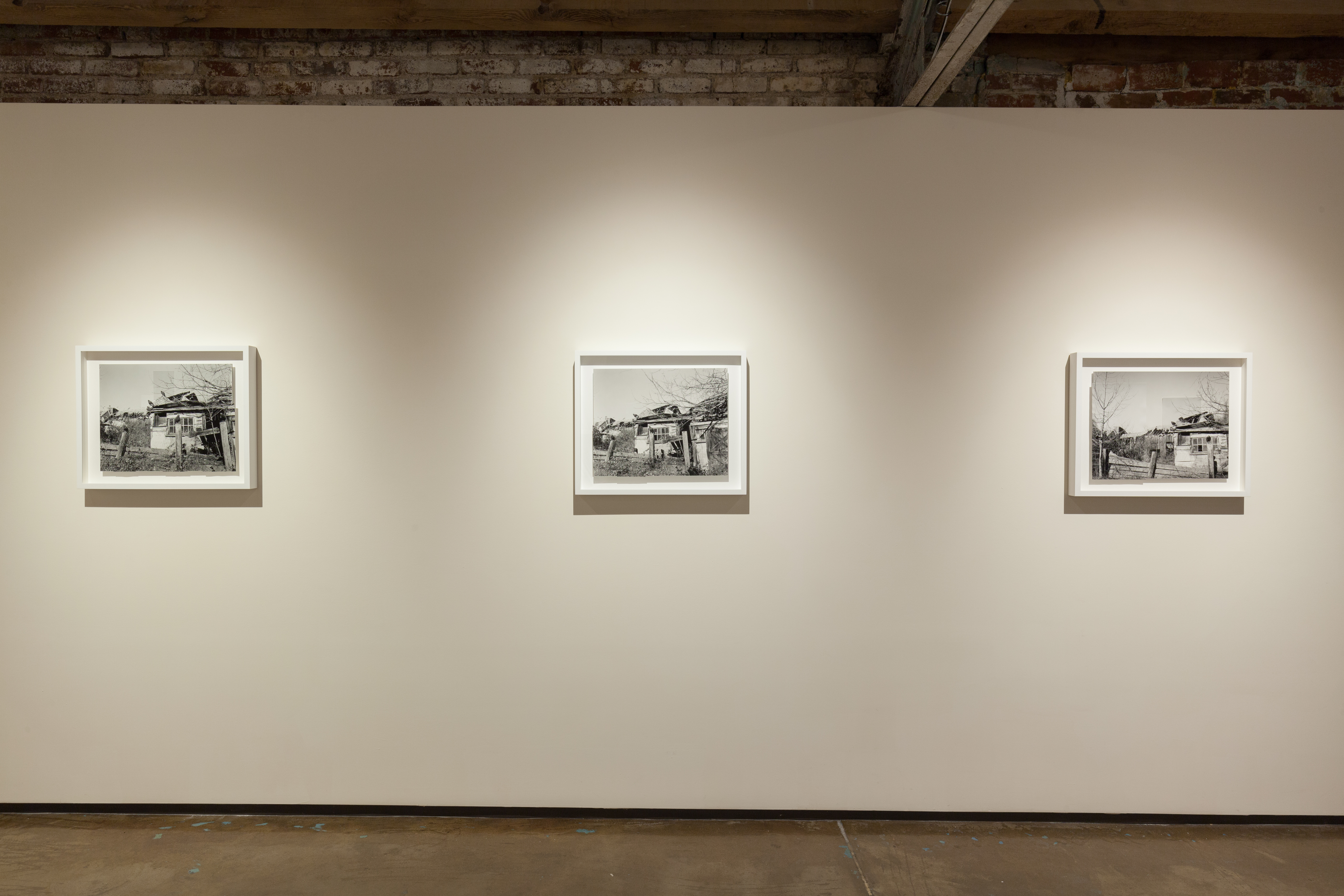
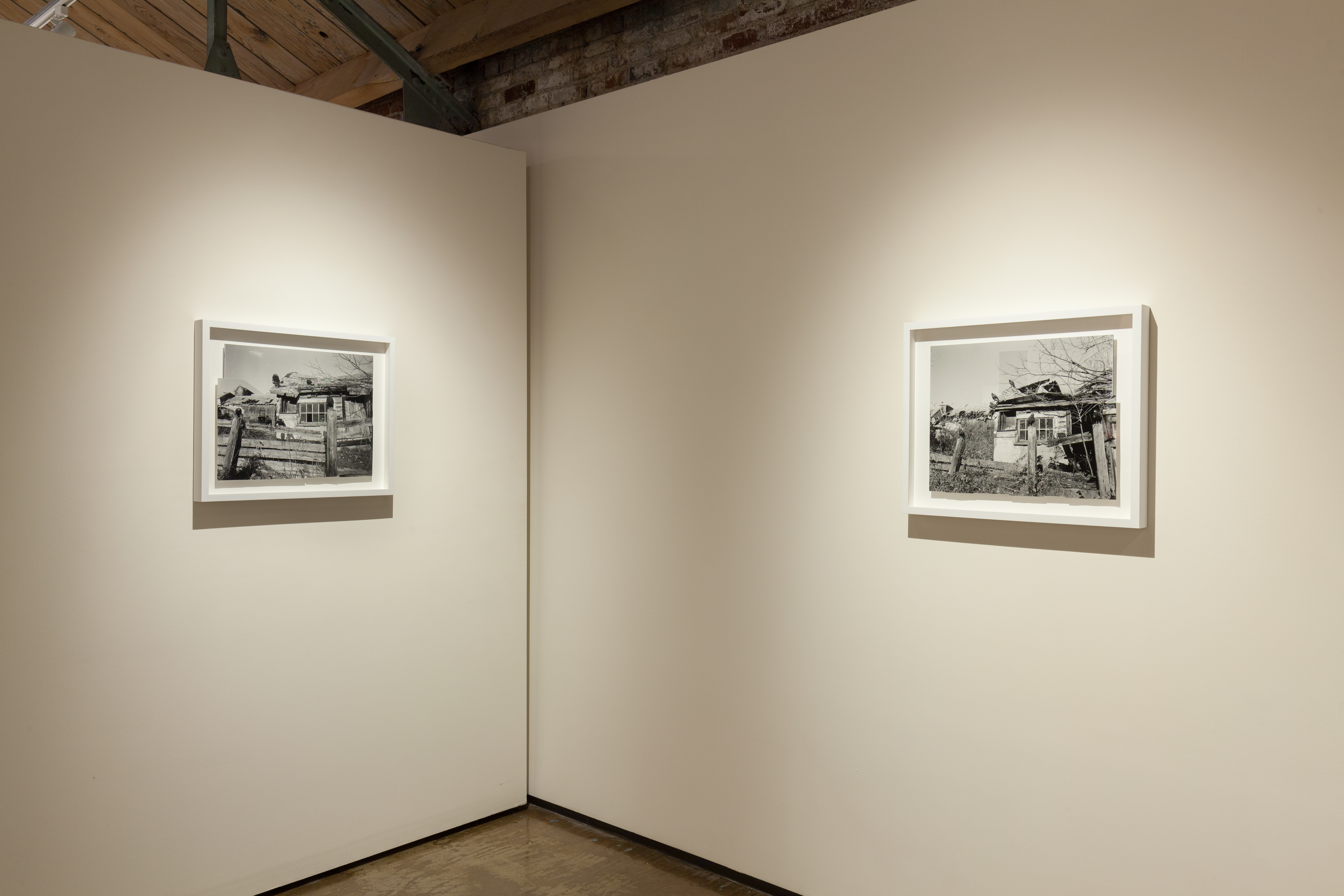
Lynton's series The Birds on exhibition at Goodwin Fine Art, Denver in 2017

One of Lynton's best known works is Bare Handed, a series exploring the spiritual connection between man and nature through the perspective of “rural communities struggling to maintain their agrarian traditions and natural resources despite the challenges of globalization, competing technology, agribusiness, and even weather.” In 2008, Lynton was inspired to develop Bare Handed after photographing a New Mexico beekeeper and his apprentice handling a swarm without protective gear. In reference to Lynton's image "Stephen, Mayflies, Oklahoma, 2009," Adam Monohan, curator for Center for Creative Photography in Arizona, has stated: "Like Weston, Holly Lynton takes rural life as her subject in this photograph. Made in the context of the artist’s Bare Handed series, a sweeping chronicle concentrating on the connection between humans and their natural environment, the photograph presents a vision of the rural South that is refreshingly free from common visual tropes.” The images in Bare Handed have also been compared to photography of the Depression-era, when the Farm Security Administration hired photographers to document the economic devastation experienced by poor famers. Lynton has stated she intentionally sought to contrast those “historical images of hardship” produced by the FSA by instead depicting American agricultural workers engaged in reverent, mutually beneficial relationships with their environment. In 2013 one of the images from Bare Handed, "Turkey Madonna," was awarded first prize in the Syngenta Photography Award Open Competition for its exploration of the tension between rural and urban environments. That same year, Lynton's work on Bare Handed was also recognized by the Mass Cultural Council with an Artist Fellowship Award for Photography. In 2016, she was honored with an Individual Photographer's Fellowship from the Aaron Siskind Foundation.

Since 2017, Lynton has been working on a new series titled Under the Brush Arbor, which examines the modern legacy of Methodist camp meetings in South Carolina; the title is a reference to the practice of brush arbor revivals. In support of her adjacent research exploring the origins of and the Civil War's influence on Methodist camp meetings, Lynton was awarded a postdoctoral fellowship from the Gilder Lehrman Center for the Study of Slavery, Resistance, and Abolition at Yale University in 2019.

In addition to her photography work, Lynton has served as a visiting instructor at Amherst College in Massachusetts and on the faculty of Maine Media Workshops + College. She has given lectures and artist talks for numerous venues, including the Williston Northampton School, the Philadelphia Photo Arts Center, and Yale University. Her images and essays have appeared in publications such as The New Yorker, Southern Cultures,Oxford American, and Gravy (Southern Foodways Alliance), among others.

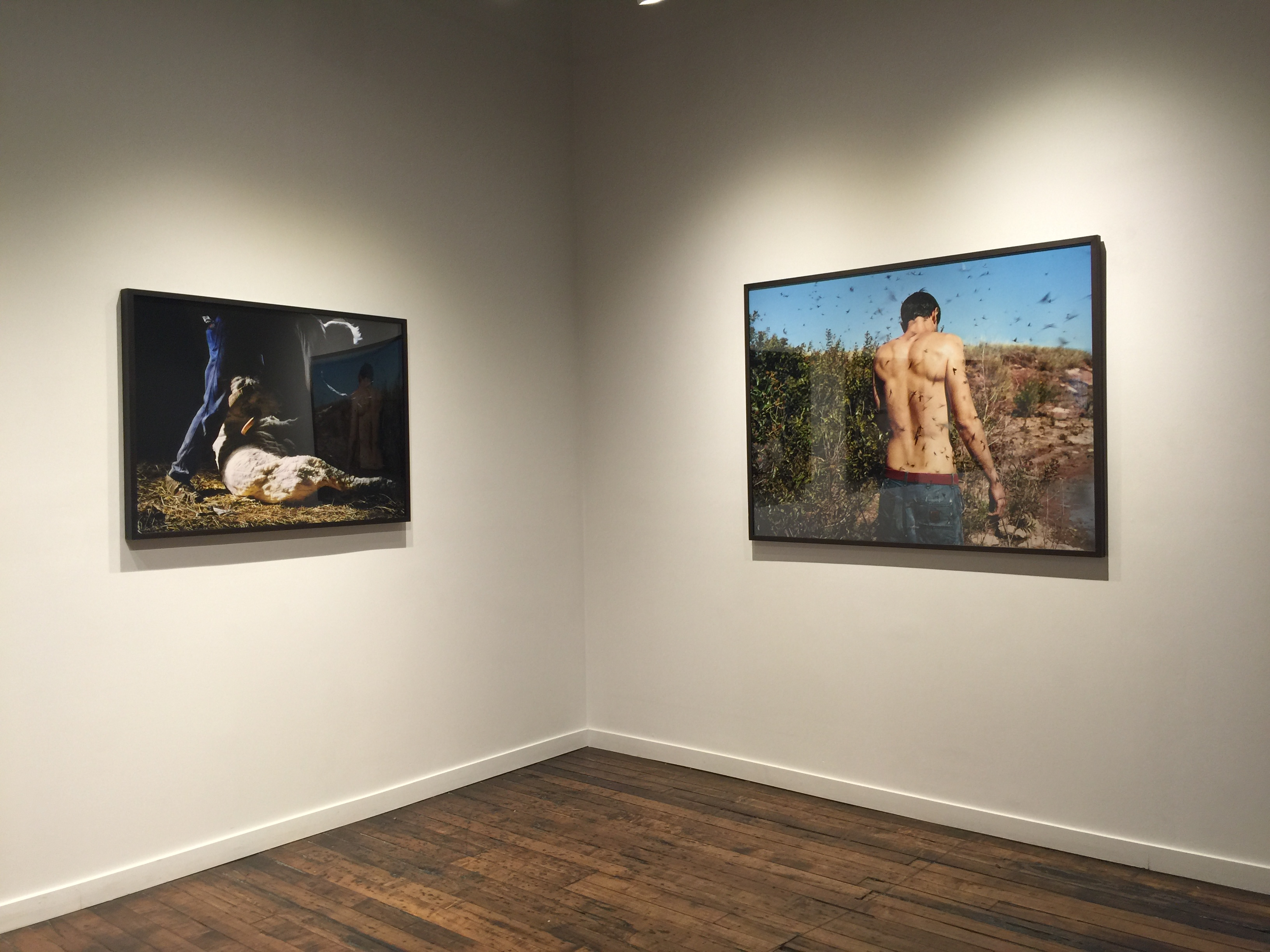
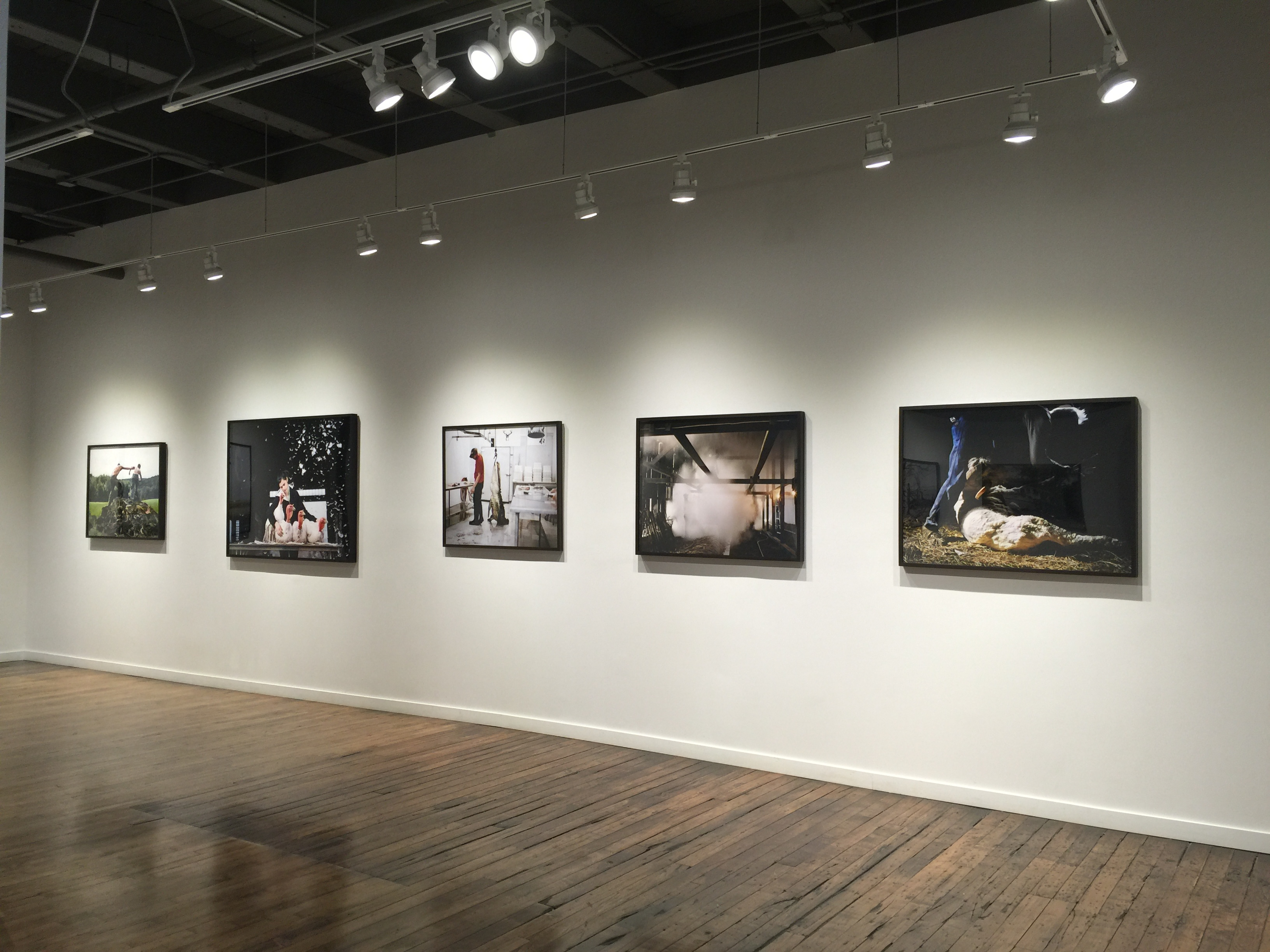
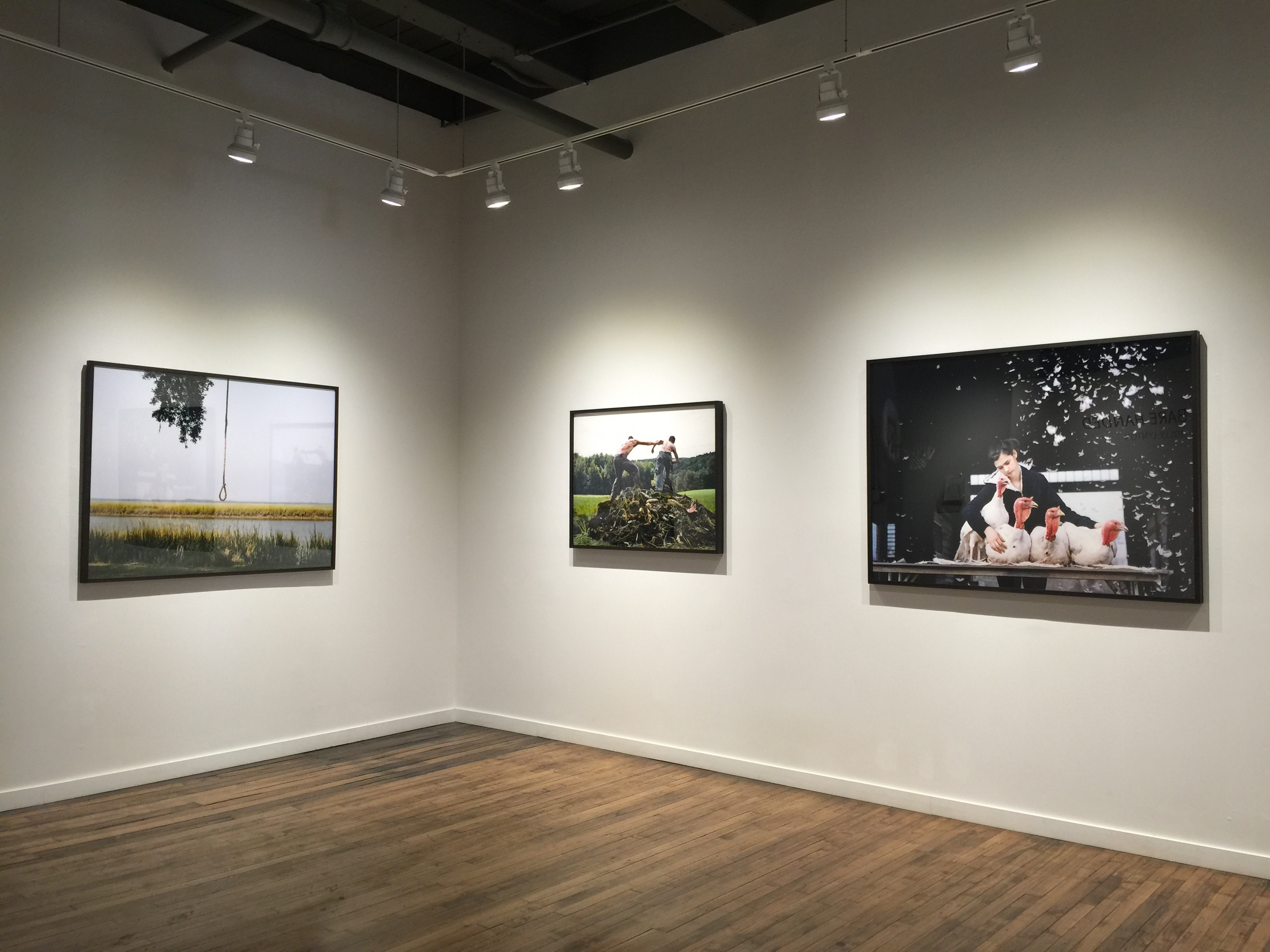
Lynton's series Bare Handed on exhibition at Filter Space, Chicago in 2016

== Selected awards and fellowships ==
- 2021 – Critical Mass 2021, Top 50
- 2020 – Critical Mass 2020, Finalist
- 2019 – Gilder Lehrman Center for the Study of Slavery, Resistance, and Abolition at Yale University, Postdoctoral Fellowship
- 2016 – Aaron Siskind Individual Photographer's Fellowship Award
- 2013 – Massachusetts Cultural Council Artist Fellowship Award
- 2013 – Syngenta Photography Award, First Prize

== Selected solo exhibitions ==
- 2020 – Bare Handed, Williston School, Easthampton, MA
- 2017 – The Birds, Goodwin Fine Art, Denver, CO
- 2016 – Bare Handed, Filter Space, Chicago, IL
- 2015 – Bare Handed, Dina Mitrani Gallery, Miami, FL
- 2014 – Pioneer Valley, Miller Yezerski Gallery, Boston, MA
- 2011 – Fleeced, Bernice Steinbaum Gallery, Miami, FL
- 2008 – Holly Lynton, Galerie Schuster, Berlin, Germany
- 2006 – Solid Ground, Jen Bekman Gallery, New York, NY
- 2005 – Orange Tickle, Jersey City Museum, Jersey City, NJ
- 2004 – Mean Ceiling, Mixed Greens, New York, NY
- 2000 – In Between, Kathryn Markel Fine Art, New York, NY

== Selected group exhibitions ==
- 2021 – On the Basis of Art: 150 Years of Women at Yale
- 2021 – In Conversation with the Land
- 2021 – Four Degrees: Eco Anxiety and Climate Change
- 2021 – UnBound10!, Candela Gallery, Richmond, VA
- 2018 – We Feed the World, London, UK
- 2017 – Animal as Metaphor, Howard Yezerski Gallery, Boston, MA
- 2017 – On Freedom, Aperture Gallery, New York, NY
- 2016 – FIX, Photo London, London, UK
- 2015 – Field Study, David Weinberg Gallery, Chicago, IL
- 2014 – Massachusetts Cultural Council Photography Awards Exhibition, New Art Center, Newtonville, MA
- 2013 – Syngenta Photography Awards Exhibition, Somerset House, London, England
