= Gidon Eshel =

American geophysicist

- Occupation: Geophysicist

Gidon Eshel is an American geophysicist best known for his quantification of the "geophysical consequences of agriculture and diet". As of 2017, he is research professor at Bard College in New York. He is known for his research on the environmental impacts of plant-based diets.

== Career ==
Eshel studied physics and earth sciences at Technion – Israel Institute of Technology, before obtaining a Master of Arts (MA) degree, MPhil, and a PhD on mathematical physics at Columbia University. His Ph.D. thesis at Columbia was titled Coupling of deep water formation and the general circulation : a case study of the Red Sea. Eshel was then a postdoctoral NOAA Climate & Global Change (C&GC) Fellow at the Harvard Department for Earth & Planetary Physics, a staff scientist at the Woods Hole Oceanographic Institute, and also a faculty member of department of geophysics at the University of Chicago. Eshel also advises Bluefield Technologies on livestock methane emissions.

== Research ==
Gidon Eshel's early research found that the mean American diet that is rich in animal products such as red meat releases more carbon dioxide (CO_{2}) into the atmosphere than a lacto-ovo vegetarian, poultry-based, pescatarian, or vegan diet. Compared with a plant-based diet, the mean American diet results in 1,500 kilograms of CO_{2} per person annually. He has campaigned against beef consumption as cattle grazing increases greenhouse gas production and negative environmental impacts such as wildlife displacement, soil erosion and damage to river systems. He has commented that "save going all-out vegan, the most impactful change that you can make is to ditch beef altogether and replace it with poultry—just beef to poultry".

Recent examples of his work compare several livestock and land and water use, fertiliser-based water pollution, and greenhouse gas emissions per factor unit of product. His highest cited paper is "Forecasting Zimbabwean maize yield using eastern equatorial Pacific sea surface temperature" at 445 times, according to Google Scholar.

In 2019, it was reported in the Scientific American that Eshel and his colleagues published findings in the Nature journal which found that "if all Americans switched away from meat, it would eliminate the need for pastureland and reduce the amount of high-quality cropland under cultivation by as much as 25 percent." His research has shown that by switching to a plant-based diet it would eliminate about 80 percent of greenhouse-gas emissions from agriculture in the United States.

== Personal life ==
Eshel supports plant-based diets and has described his own diet as "mostly vegan".

== Selected publications ==
=== Articles ===
- Forecasting Zimbabwean maize yield using eastern equatorial Pacific sea surface temperature. Nature 370, 204–205, 21 July 1994 (with Mark Cane and R.W. Buckland)
- Diet, Energy, and Global Warming. Earth Interactions. 2006. 10: 1- 17. (with Pamela A. Martin)
- Geophysics and nutritional science: toward a novel, unified paradigm. The American Journal of Clinical Nutrition 89, no. 5, (2009): 1710S. (with Pamela A. Martin)
- Land, irrigation water, greenhouse gas, and reactive nitrogen burdens of meat, eggs, and dairy production in the United States. PNAS Vol. 111, No. 33 (August 19, 2014), pp. 11996-12001 (with Alon Shepon, Tamar Makov and Ron Milo)
- The opportunity cost of animal based diets exceeds all food losses. Proceedings of the National Academy of Sciences of the United States of America, 2018.
- Environmentally Optimal, Nutritionally Sound, Protein and Energy Conserving Plant Based Alternatives to U.S. Meat. Nature, 2019.

=== Books ===
- Spatiotemporal data analysis, 2012. Princeton University Press

=== Films ===
- Starred in British documentary film Planeat
- Starred in the Leonardo DiCaprio documentary film Before the Flood
