= Jack Picone =

Australian documentary photographer, author, and academic

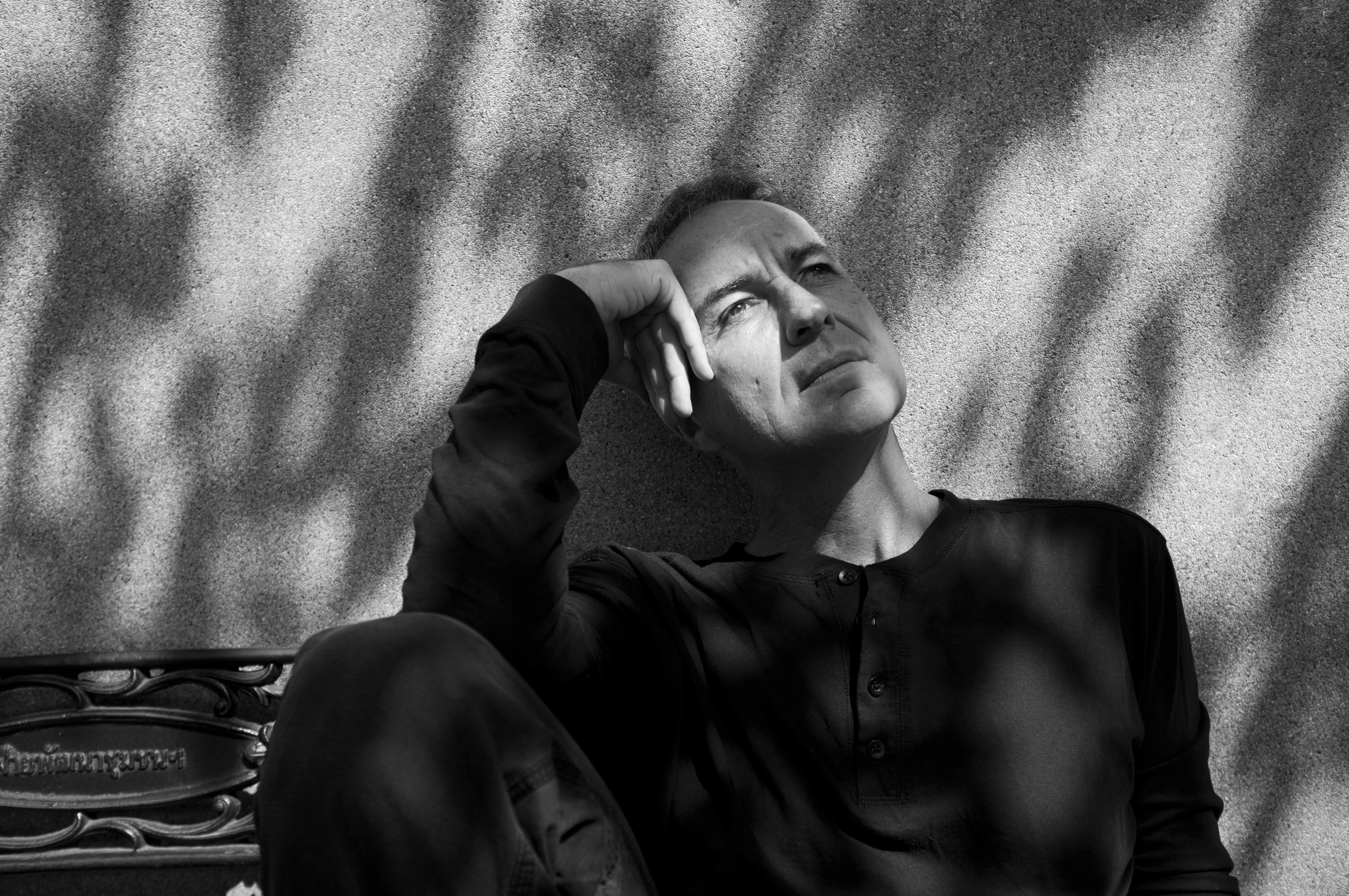
- Self-portrait of Jack V. Picone
- Born: Jack V. Picone; 1958 (age 67–68); Moree, New South Wales, Australia
- Occupations: Documentary photographer, photojournalist, author, tutor, academic
- Years active: 1987–ongoing
- Known for: War correspondence, Positive Lives project, Nuba photoessays, Reportage Festival/workshops, Degree South Collective
- Website: Official website

Jack V. Picone (born 1958) is an Australian documentary photographer, photojournalist, author, festival/collective founder, tutor and academic. He specialises in social-documentary photography.

Picone's coverage of war zones and social issues is internationally prominent, and over a career spanning more than three decades, his photojournalism has encompassed 10 conflicts across three continents, the global HIV/AIDS pandemic and the Nuba peoples of Sudan, Africa, among many other subjects.

His work has been featured in a wide range of international publications including Time, Newsweek, The Sydney Morning Herald (SMH), The Age, Liberation, Der Spiegel, L'Express, Granta, Independent (UK) and The Observer. As of 2016, Picone's work is held at various venues including the Australian War Memorial, State Library of NSW and National Portrait Gallery of Australia, and his exhibited work has been displayed at numerous international venues, including the Australian Centre of Photography, University of Berkeley, United Nations headquarters and Visa Pour L'Image Perpignan. Picone has also authored/coauthored seven books.

Among his list of honours, Picone is a three-time winner of the Picture of the Year International (POYi) award; a winner of the UNESCO Humanity Photo award, the Mother Jones/IFDP Grant for Social Documentary Photography award and the World Press Photo award; and a finalist of both the Walkley Awards and the Amnesty International Media Awards.

Picone received both his Master of Visual Arts (MVA) and PhD from Griffith University, Queensland, Australia, and he was an "Artist-in-Residence" visiting professor of Lingnan University in Hong Kong from 2012 to 2014. As of the beginning of 2017, he is a lecturer at Mahidol University in Thailand.

== Early life and education ==
Born in Moree, New South Wales (NSW), Australia, in 1958, Picone grew up in rural Australia, and is of an Italian Australian and English Australian background, a period that was later self-described as a "privileged middle-class background". Picone's grandfather served with the Australian military in Papua New Guinea during World War II, and this would later influence the direction of his photographic career.

During his early childhood, Picone was intermittently cared for by an Australian-Aboriginal nanny who he knew as "Ilene"; in 2016, Picone recounted the times when Ilene would be driven back to the local mission where she lived: "I vividly recall at the end of each working week my father putting Ilene and me in his big 1966 Chevrolet car and driving us out of town … We drove 'down the track' to drop Ilene back to the 'mission' (Aboriginal settlement) to be reunited with her family and friends."

Between 1971 and 1977, Picone completed his high-school certificate at Waverley College in Sydney, Australia. His master's studies at Griffith University commenced much later in 2002, lasting until 2006, and he eventually received his PhD in documentary photography from the same institution in 2014.

== Work ==
In her 2007 book Photography and Australia, Helen Ennis writes that Picone is among a group of photographers and photojournalists who emerged during the postmodernism of the post-1980s era, when documentary photography "unexpectedly resurfaced". Ennis explains that documentary photography and photojournalism had become divided during the 1970s due to ideology, but this gap was lessened in the 1990s due to factors such as the introduction of glossy weekend magazines, which presented photographic essays on contemporary life. Ennis includes Picone as one of the "social documentary" photographers alongside Stephen Dupont and David Dare Parker.

Picone's first professional role was that of a staff photographer at the prominent Australian daily newspaper, SMH, as well as its weekend glossy magazine, Good Weekend, which is a position he began in 1987. Around the same time, Simon O'Dwyer and Trent Parke were gaining experience, also as staff photographers, at The Age and The Australian, respectively. In 2015, however, Picone revealed that the SMH job became "repetitive and unchallenging", leading him to enthusiastically indicate his interest in the role of Gulf War photojournalist in 1991 when the opening was announced by one of the SMH photo editors.

=== War/conflict ===
Picone explained to the VICE publication in 2013 that, in contrast with the stereotypical "adrenaline junkie" and voyeur perceptions of war correspondents, he was actually seeking to challenge himself to see if he could remain headstrong under such arduous conditions after having considered the prospect for a number of years: "I wanted … to see if I would be able to keep my head—literally and metaphorically." Picone would later explain that the role of the war photographer is to provide a voice for the "invisible" and the disempowered.

The "final catalyst", in Picone's words, was the Laurie Lee book As I Walked Out One Midsummer Morning, a fictional account of a young man who leaves his home in Cotswolds, England, UK, in 1943 and eventually finds himself in the Spanish Civil War. Picone explained in 2013 that Lee "really captured the atmosphere of the Spain he saw, coloured by his young man idealism."

After his acceptance of the Gulf War assignment, Picone was sent to Baghdad, Iraq, but his introduction to war photojournalism was brief, as he was soon arrested by the Iraqi secret police for having transmitted photographs of Iraqi troops entering Kuwait, and this was followed by his deportation to Jordan. Also in 1991, Picone managed to clandestinely enter Gaza with the assistance of the Palestine Liberation Organisation (PLO), because he "didn't want to be officially attached to the Israeli Army". But again, he was deported, this time by Israeli authorities, after he was caught photographing the death of a young Palestinian.

Picone was subsequently sent to cover the First Nagorno-Karabakh War in Armenia, which he has called his "first 'real' war experience". Arriving in Armenia in 1992, aged 30 years, Picone has described the trench warfare of the conflict as akin to that of the First World War. During one mountain-side attack that led to shrapnel injuries, Picone recalls experiencing an "affirming, edifying euphoria that comes with escaping death".

Following Armenia, Picone not only relocated to London, UK, but his war work also changed continents as he commenced his coverage of his first-ever conflict in Africa, which was to lead to further work in the region. In 1992, he entered the war zone of the Somali Civil War during a famine, and this was followed by his time in Angola from 1993 to 1995, which was also dealing with a civil war. In Angola, Picone spent time in the city of Quito, where he experienced an "ominous" silence and was struck by how "war weary" the women and children appeared. Picone's Angolan work also includes images of the MPLA (Popular Movement for the Liberation of Angola) soldiers, sick children, and ex-soldiers who had been chained to mechanical parts in mental hospitals. Picone wrote of Angola in 2015: "No matter how many times I photographed scenes of poverty and desperation … I never failed to be confronted by the pathos of it."

Following the publication of his Angolan images throughout Europe, Picone was subject to public criticism regarding a set of images wherein a young civilian Angolan male is beaten and shot by MPLA soldiers for refusing the compulsory-conscription campaign of the MPLA. Picone, who was accused of voyeurism, later recalled that he was unsure if the man eventually died, but asserted that he was helpless to prevent the incident, and risked being shot by the soldiers if he attempted to intervene.

In 1994, Picone spanned two continents, covering the Bosnian War in the former Yugoslavia and the "100 Days of Slaughter" in Rwanda, Africa. In Bosnia, Picone captured images of Bosnian Muslim fighters engaged in trench warfare and children during the Siege of Sarajevo; he described the children of the conflict as typically stressed, aggressive and erratic. The photographer's Rwandan experience was described in 2016 as a "dark journey into a country rapidly descending into a vision of hell." In his recounting, Picone's focus is the rural town of Rukara, where "nobody was spared"—the parish church was the scene of many devastated corpses, and mounds of dead bodies were piled up in the nearby woods. Since his return to London that year, Picone affirmed in 2016 that "the nightmare of Rwanda has never left me."

The First Liberian Civil War was the subject of Picone's correspondence in 1996, but it was not until 2001 that he returned to another conflict zone. After returning to Australia in 1998, where he founded the Sydney branch of the now-defunct Network Photographers agency, Picone was accompanied by a fellow Australian photographer to the Thai/Myanmar-border town of Mae Sai, where fighting had broken out between the Shan State Army and the Burmese Army.

Picone's war photography was then featured in the 2002 "Beyond the Facade: Twentyone Years of Photojournalism From Network Photographers" exhibition that commemorated the 21st anniversary of the Network agency, which had been founded in London by young photographers looking to publish "politically concerned pictures". Over the course of the agency's lifespan, Picone contributed to the forming of its reputation as a source of "hard-hitting" photojournalism.

Picone was based in Bangkok at the time of the 2010 Thai political protests that were organised by the United Front for Democracy Against Dictatorship ("Red Shirts"), and his detailed account of two army snipers, who he was physically alongside while they were engaged in conflict, was published in SMH. His coverage produced the photographic essay "Battle for Bangkok", for which Picone became a finalist at the 2010 Walkley Awards.

=== HIV/AIDS ===
After the launch of the Positive Lives project in 1993, a HIV/AIDS photographic collaboration between the Terrence Higgins Trust and Concern Worldwide, Picone volunteered as a contributor over a nine-year period. The volunteer-led project sought to use photography to address the stigma and prejudices surrounding the virus, and reached over two million people during a 15-year period.

Although Picone's documentation was varied, comprising a Thai monastery hospice, a Thai children's home for orphans living with the virus, the Hong Kong/China border where sex workers and truck drivers had become unwitting viral transmitters, and Australian HIV-positive activists, it was his work with Andrew Knox that became the most prominent. Knox had contracted the virus at the age of 14 years through a blood transfusion and subsequently invited Picone to document his life story until he died in 1999. Knox was diagnosed with Aids Dementia Complex (ADC), which made it impossible for him to live at home. In addition to memory loss, seizures and violent mood swings, he was hospitalised frequently with pneumonia.

In accordance with Knox's invitation, Picone remained with Knox until his last living moment, when he was surrounded by his family. Picone's body of Positive Lives work regarding Knox then formed a central component of the 2004 "experimental piece" The Scent of Positive Lives: (Re)Memorializing Our Loved Ones by Angela Kelly, then a doctoral student with La Trobe University's Australian Research Centre in Sex, Health and Society, and Aaron Kerner, then a lecturer at San Francisco State University. Kelly wrote in the article, which was published in the academic journal Qualitative Inquiry:

Jack Picone, a photographer with the project, requested Andrew, his family, and my involvement … The images captured and presented in Positive Lives are positive, in both living and dying … The exhibition itself is a positive response to HIV … I feel united with those in the images of Positive Lives. I feel united with those of the epidemic who remain faceless, those who attended and continue to attend the exhibition.

The series of images that Picone captured formed part of the Reveries: Photography and Mortality exhibition that was held at the National Portrait Gallery in Canberra, Australia, in 2007; additionally, Picone published an article entitled "Andrew's Story" in the Al Jazeera Magazine publication in 2015.

=== Nuba ===
After becoming interested in the Nuba people through the work of now-deceased German filmmaker and photographer, Leni Riefenstahl—most notable for her role as the lead propagandist of Adolf Hitler's Nazi regime—Picone became the third-ever person to enter the Nuba Mountain area to document the corresponding tribespeople. Riefenstahl had published her images in works like The Last of the Nuba (1974), while deceased British photojournalist and Magnum Photos founder George Rodger preceded her in 1949. Picone explained in 2006 that he had "researched the area fairly thoroughly but it was still a 'locked' expanse of geography and had been for approximately fifteen years."

Picone eventually sought to not only address the "dearth of accurate information from inside the mountains" that he encountered, but he also wanted to create "visual footsteps" in a "storytelling sense":

… the idea that this noble group of people living in a very remote region, that had been a closed door to the rest of the world, fuelled my imagination. It gave me a powerful desire to go there; document their lives and tell their story. I so much wanted to see how their world had changed in the time that eclipsed since Riefenstahl and Rodger had been there.

The photographer completed two trips to the Nuba Mountains, in 1994 and 1996, and his first entry was facilitated by a commander from the Sudanese People's Liberation Army (SPLA), which was warring with the Khartoum government troops at the time. Picone was forced to leave the Nuba Mountains in 1994 due to his contraction of malaria; however, his subsequent report to Médicins Sans Frontières (MSF) led to the delivery of emergency medicines to the region. In 2011, Picone described the remarkable cultural activities that he witnessed and captured, including a rain dance and a scarification ceremony; both involved the Nuba women, who danced at the end of the harvest period, while a woman was scarified by a pig tusk "when she first menstruated, when she formed breasts and then when she gave birth."

Picone's photos regarding the Nuba were first published in the British literary magazine Granta in the late 1990s, as "The Nuba", with the text provided by journalist John Ryle. A feature article entitled "Vanishing People" was later published in SMH on 1 November 1997, and this was followed by the Nuba exhibition as part of the 2011 Ballarat International Foto Biennale in Ballarat, Victoria, Australia. In 2006, Picone stated that the Nuba people remain an "enigma" and that the "story is still unfinished" for him.

After seeing Picone's published work on the Nuba, Riefenstahl invited him to meet with her in Germany—she sent Picone a letter in the late 1990s in which she expressed her interest in hearing the photographer's experiences with the Nuba. To the confusion of his journalist friends, Picone declined the invitation because he "felt uneasy" being "in the same orbit of a woman who was that close to Hitler." In 2006, Picone admitted that "in retrospect it was probably a mistake not to go."

=== Social issues ===
Picone was commissioned by a major Australian magazine in 1996 to report on the issue of alcoholism among the Indigenous population of Alice Springs in desert Australia. He encountered violence and drunken behaviour, and was compelled to intervene after one episode wherein a woman named "Nancy" was beaten by a heavily intoxicated male—Picone drove her to an Aboriginal community where alcohol was not allowed, hoping that she would be safe there. Picone recalled in 2016 that the town "resembled … another planet."

After his relocation to Southeast Asia in 2000, Picone documented the experiences of the Karen ethnic group, including the Kayan tribe, in relation to the ongoing conflict in Myanmar. For this work, Picone visited the Mae La border camp, the border town of Mae Sot and the Golden Horse monastery in the hills of the Golden Triangle, the latter of which provides refuge to orphaned boys from Myanmar's Shan State.

In October 2015, Picone published a photographic essay on the Nai Soi village, where Kayan tribespeople have become self-sufficient through the tourism income they earn since fleeing Myanmar. Visitors who want to see the "long-necks" or "giraffe women" who wear the customary brass neck rings of the hill tribe are charged an entry fee to walk through the village.

Also for Al Jazeera, Picone visited the Ban Khun Samut Chin fishing village in Thailand in 2015 with respect to the impact of climate change. According to the village chief, the whole community is anxious because the village has faced "rising seas and coastal erosion for over 30 years".

=== Reportage Festival and Documentary Photography Workshops ===
The inaugural Reportage Festival of photojournalism, cofounded by Picone, Dupont, Dare Parker and Michael Amendolia, another documentary photographer, was held in Sydney after the concept was first conceived of in Bondi, Sydney, in 1999. The founders hired the now-defunct Valhalla Cinema venue in the inner-city suburb of Glebe, wherein two Kodak carousels that alternated between large-scale projections of vertical and horizontal photojournalism images were set up.

For the 2013 instalment of the event that was held annually for a period after its inception, U.S. photographer James Nachtwey showed his Testimony collection at an outdoor exhibition at Circular Quay, which includes images from El Salvador, Nicaragua, Guatemala, Lebanon and Afghanistan. Further, one of the workshops was hosted by Alex Webb and Rebecca Norris Webb from Magnum Photos. A partnership was formed for the first time with the Vivid Sydney festival for the 2013 Reportage event, but a non-negotiable censorship decision from the then-CEO of Destination NSW, the organisational owner of the Vivid brand, resulted in the placement of a considerable burden upon the Reportage festival directors who were forced to rearrange sophisticated technology to ensure that projections that had been planned for the outdoor venues were only seen in indoor settings including the works of international artists like Francesco Zizola. Walkley Award-winning photojournalist Andrew Quilty used the term "nanny state" in an interview with a Junkee Media writer, clarifying that what upset him most was the implementation of merely an individual's decision. Picone and Dupont appeared on the Australian breakfast TV programme Sunrise on 7 to further discuss the issue publicly.

Picone founded the Reportage photography workshops that allow participants to undertake international assignments on location with experienced photojournalists who are familiar with the corresponding places in 2005 initially as "Communiqué"—the "Reportage" renaming occurred later. Partnering with Dupont, the first postrenaming workshop was held in Cambodia in 2010, and this was sequentially followed by Nepal, Indonesia and Myanmar. Video footage of the Nepalese workshop, shot in Kathmandu, was published on the Vimeo platform by the Reportage multimedia tutor Ed Giles.

== Other work ==
=== Wind Riders ===
During the period wherein Picone covered war zones in Africa, he accumulated images of fishing workers off the east coast of Africa (south Somalia and Kenya) for "therapy and restoration". The images eventually formed the Wind Riders collection.

=== The Shearers ===
Around the turn of the 21st century, Picone shot The Shearers collection in the rural NSW area of Australia that he had grown up in, documenting an occupation that had "epitomised the machismo and romanticism of the outback." Picone recalls childhood memories of "strong, sunburnt, irreverent men who worked hard and played hard." In 2016, he contributed the Shearers image "Road Stop #1" to the Project 365 + 1 online art project for which poetry and photography are combined.

=== Lake Providence ===
During the late 1990s, Picone read that the small U.S. town of Lake Providence, Louisiana, had been identified as the country's socio-economically poorest area, and this led him to travel to the town to capture images for his Small Town America series.

=== Portraiture ===
As part of his portrait work, Picone spent time with gay activist, writer and artist Quentin Crisp in 1990, at his apartment in New York City, New York, U.S. Crisp died nine years later, slightly prior to his 91st birthday.

== Documentary photography and photojournalism ==
In terms of his overall perspective regarding documentary photography and photojournalism, Picone made the following statement in 2011:

Documentary photography enables me to approach people from cultures vastly different to my own and communicate with them. As I document people and tell their stories, communication is exchanged between myself and them. Finally when those photographs are published in another place, it becomes a catalyst for further communication between different cultures. I like the idea that my reportages can be a conduit of communication between different cultures in different places. It is like the beginning of an intriguing conversation … Photography enables me to tell their story on a micro level but it also points to a story about the world we all live in, on a macro level.

He further explained "documentary practice" in 2013 in terms of storytelling; that is, it is driven "by [a] human need to know, to tell, to share and connect with others on both rational and non-rational levels."

Regarding war correspondence specifically, Picone's attitude was expressed as part of a feature piece in Volume 36 of Australia's Digital Photography magazine in 2014, wherein he said to the interviewer that one's role is not voyeuristic, but it is instead to "give someone a voice who doesn't have one." He also acknowledged, however, that the "grey area" of conflict zones means that he has approached each case according to its own circumstances, and he concluded with the warning that those who seek to "save the world and help everyone" on every assignment will not achieve their original goal.

In a 2012 interview with a Bond University-thesis student, in which all four of the Reportage Festival founders participated, Picone explained the major danger-related challenges faced by photojournalists of his ilk:

I mean photojournalists do tend to take great risks, more than most average people do, and go to places they probably shouldn't because a lot of the things that they're covering are either conflict or they're just contentious in their own right. So they do tend to put themselves in harm's way at different times, not all the time, but there's definitely an element of danger and risk for one's, anything from one's health to one's life.

When asked about his advice for aspiring "conflict zone photojournalists" in March 2016, Picone revealed that he wants to tell such people that they should not proceed, but what he typically says in actuality is that they should not go to any conflict zone unless they "have the greatest well founded conviction for going there in the first place" because it "is not the movies and it is not a computer game … You can die."

In 2013, Picone described his "deep shock" after his coverage of Rwanda. He explained that the "emotional hangover of witnessing the genocide can't be described" and that he "began experiencing nightmares which continued for eight years." In a number of interviews over the course of his career, however, Picone has clarified that he has never been concerned so much with dying, but it has been the idea of becoming a burden to his family due to injury that has been the overwhelming issue for him.

== Equipment and technique ==
Picone is a brand ambassador of Fujifilm Australia after he was first recruited in 2011 for the launch of the X100 product. Picone has since worked on the launches of the X-Pro1, X100s and X-E2 products; for the X100s, Picone traveled to Myanmar and Cambodia with Swedish filmmaker Gerhard Joren to use the camera model. In March 2016, Picone identified his preferred camera models and explained why Fujfilm's products are his favoured photography gear:

Their film cameras … GS645 medium format and the Fujilfilm TX 1 Panorama. Their latest digital release the X-Pro-2 is "off the graph" in terms of sensor quality, has a small discreet retro style that is easy to run with in a war zone and it doesn't scream out "kill me" for my ostentatious—worth way too much money—DSLR camera.

Picone said in 2014 that he had sold all of his DSLR cameras in 2011 because he had ceased using them. DSLR cameras had become cumbersome for him, and had become an "affront" in the sensitive situations that he often documents, whereby the subjects could "freeze up and react".

On his website, Picone states that his long-term, ongoing passion for black-and-white photography and traditional darkroom printing is due to the medium's "capacity for both subtlety and drama." Picone quotes photographer Robert Frank, who said in 1951: "To me they [black-and-white photographs] symbolise the alternatives of hope and despair to which mankind is forever subjected." Regarding their Reportage workshops, Picone and Dupont apply the dictum of Eddie Adams: "If it makes you laugh, if it makes you cry, if it rips out your heart, that's a good picture."

== Publications ==
- 24 Studen Im Leben der katholischen Kirche, Random House GmbH, Munich, 2005.
- Proud To Be Nuba: Faces and Voices, Stories of a Long Struggle, Code X Publishing, 2007.
- Reveries: Photography and Mortality, Australian National Portrait Gallery, 2007 – book accompaniment for the photographic exhibition.
- This Day of Change: 132 Photographers Capture Hope, Courrier Japon, Kodansha, 2009.
- War: A Degree South Collection, T&G Publishing, Hardcover, 2009.
- Blood and Love, self-published book of 20 years of documentary photography, 2010.
- 10X100: FINEPIX X100 by 10 Australian Photographers, T&G Publishing, Hardcover, 2011.
- Shaman of Bali by John Greet, Monsoon, Paperback/eBook, 2016 – cover photograph by Picone.

== Selected exhibitions ==
- 2021: IMAGINE: REFLECTIONS ON PEACE MUSEUM OF THE INTERNATIONAL RED CROSS GENEVA.
- 2021: IMAGINE: REFLECTIONS ON PEACE BRUSSELS.
- 2020: INTERNATIONAL CENTRE OF RED CROSS ZURICH "Peace."
- 2018: APERATURE INTERNATIONAL CONFERENCE "Photography Ethics."
- 2017: MUSEE DE L'HOMME PARIS "Human Rights."
- 2017: MUSEUM AAN DE STROOM HOLLAND "BODY ART"
- 2017: MONASH GALLERY OF ART "PEACE": A Degree South Collective Exhibition.
- 2011: BALLARAT INTERNATIONAL FOTO BIENNALE "The Nuba of Sudan."
- 2010: AUSTRALIAN CENTRE OF PHOTOGRAPHY "War: South."
- 2007: NATIONAL PORTRAIT GALLERY OF AUSTRALIA, Reveries: Photography And Mortality.
- 2007: NATIONAL PORTRAIT GALLERY OF AUSTRALIA "Reveries: Photography And Mortality."
- 2007: UNIVERSITY OF BERKELEY "State of Place: Refugee Life on the Thai-Burma Border."
- 2006: SHEFFIELD INTERNATIONAL DOCUMENTARY FESTIVAL "Vanessa, portrait of a transsexual dedicated to promoting awareness of HIV."
- 2006: FOTOFREO FESTIVAL Audio-visual projection of recent work.
- 2005: POSITIVE LIVES Positive Responses to HIV. An exhibition in situ on the platform of Madrid's Central Railway Station.
- 2004: VISA POUR L'IMAGE, PERPIGNAN, FRANCE Exhibition of 50 prints from personal book project "1200 Miles: Life and Death on the Thai-Burma Border."
- 2004: ACTIONAID XV International AIDS Conference held in Bangkok. An exhibition to expose the extreme stigma attached to HIV/AIDS.
- 2004: UNITED NATIONS, New York, "Positive Lives."
- 2003: FIFTY CROWS "Social Change Photography" at the Fifty Crows Gallery in San Francisco.
- 2002: NETWORK 21 EXHIBITION "21 years of Photojournalism."
- 2002: AUSTRALIAN CENTRE FOR PHOTOGRAPHY "Witness: An Exhibition of Australian Photography."
- 2002: CONDE NAST TRAVELLER "Truth in Travel" A group exhibition in aid of the Tusk Trust, which supports the conservation of African wildlife.
- 2001: SOUTH AFRICAN NATIONAL GALLERY "Positive Lives."
- 2000: THE AUSTRALIAN MUSEUM "Body Art," an exhibition about body adornment among indigenous peoples around the world.
- 1999: LEICA/CCP Documentary Photography Exhibition and Award at the Centre for Contemporary Photography, Melbourne.
- 1999: REPORTAGE "A celebration of Australian Photojournalism."
- 1995: AMNESTY INTERNATIONAL "YES" an exhibition of photographs dedicated to the resilience of the human spirit at the Myer Gallery, Melbourne.
- 1995: VISA POUR L'IMAGE PERPIGNAN, FRANCE "Genocide Rwanda" Audiovisual projection.

== Selected awards ==
- 1998/1999: Australian Best Commissioned Magazine Photography – Category: Portraiture.
- 1999: Leica/ CCP Documentary Photography Exhibition and Award – Finalist.
- IFDP (International Fund for Documentary Photography) award for photographic essay Living with Aids on Thailand.
- Pictures of the Year International (U.S.) 56th POYi – "Riders of the Sea", Dhow boats in Zanzibar.
- Pictures of the Year International (U.S.) – "War Children of Bosnia".
- Pictures of the Year International (U.S.) 59th POYi – "Surviving Aids".
- 1999: World Press Photo Awards (Holland) – Honorable Mention, News category.
- 1998: World Press Photo Awards (Holland) – 1st Place, Daily Life category.
- 2006: UNESCO HPA (Humanity Photo Awards) – 1st Place, Documentary Award, Daily Life category, "The Mountain People Time Forgot – The Nuba of Sudan".
- 2009: PX3 | Prix de la Photographie Paris – 1st Place Category: Water.
- 2009: Amnesty International Media Award Finalist for "Excellence in Human Rights Reporting" (multimedia category) on post-election violence in Kenya.
- 2010: Walkley Awards, Australia, Finalist for Photographic Essay Battle for Bangkok on 2010 political insurrection in Thailand.
