= Jackie Goss =

American media artist

- Born: 1967 (age 58–59); Snowville, New Hampshire, U.S.
- Education: Brown University; Rensselaer Polytechnic Institute
- Occupation: Media artist

Jackie Goss (born 1967 in Snowville, New Hampshire) is an American media artist, utilising videos and web-based projects, often featuring Flash animation techniques. Goss graduated from Brown University and received an M.F.A from Rensselaer Polytechnic Institute. She teaches at Bard College in New York.

Her work has shown in the New York Film Festival, London Film Festival, Rotterdam Film Festival, and Wexner Center for the Arts among other venues. She has received awards from the Tribeca Film Institute, Creative Capital Foundation, the Rockefeller Foundation, the Alpert Awards in the Arts, and the Berliner Kunstlerprogramm. Her videos are distributed by Video Data Bank in Chicago.

== Filmography ==
- 2007 - Stranger Comes to Town
