= Susan Playfair =

American author of food books (1940–2021)

Susan Roberta Playfair (August 23, 1940 – February 7, 2021) was an American author, who wrote two books on the industry and food of the US region of New England.

== Biography ==
Playfair was born in Plymouth, Massachusetts, on August 23, 1940, and grew up in Duxbury, Massachusetts, where she was a lifeguard and came to love the land and the sea of New England. She attended Bard College, and got a degree in fine arts. She attended a number of schools for design and fashion (Parsons School of Design, the Art Students League of New York, and the Fashion Institute of Technology), and after working on Wall Street (from 1965-1968) and in Boston (1970-1971) as a stockbroker, she opened up a clothes store in Gloucester, Massachusetts, before becoming a fashion designer. She designed clothes under the name Playfair, and sold them to Bergdorf Goodman and others. In the 1980s she moved into interior design for commercial clients.

Later in life, Playfair wrote two books on the landscape, seascape, and industry of New England. Both were published by the University Press of New England: Vanishing Species: Saving the Fish, Sacrificing the Fishermen (2003), and America's Founding Fruit: The Cranberry in a New Environment (2014). She died on February 7, 2021, at the age of 80, after a brief illness.

== Books ==
America's Founding Fruit: The Cranberry in a New Environment has chapters on the production of the cranberry, and on the families who produce it. Playfair details their livelihood, which is often marginal, and discusses the Ocean Spray cooperative. She also indicates how climate change might influence the production of cranberries, which may have to be grown further north.
