= Rosalie Purvis =

- Born: 1975 (age 50–51)
- Education: Bard College (BA); Brooklyn College (MFA); Cornell University

Rosalie Purvis (born 1975) is a Dutch-American theatre director and choreographer. She earned her Bachelor of Arts in literature and dance from Bard College, a Master of Fine Arts in directing from Brooklyn College, and a Doctor of Philosophy in performing and media arts at Cornell University. Much of her stagecraft was associated with the prestigious Duke Romijn Theatre in Amsterdam. She also co-wrote the best-selling Dutch children's book, Jana’s nachtreis, with Ceseli Josephus Jitta.

Purvis later moved to the United States and founded an avant-garde theater company, Token 150, in New York City.

In the United States, Purvis is best known for her work on Berthold Brecht's The Good Person of Szechwan and for reviving Jonathan Levy's classic, Charlie the Chicken for contemporary audiences. She has also staged new works by T.D. Mitchell and Mya Kagan.

Purvis is currently Libra Assistant Professor of English and Theatre at the University of Maine.
