= Mary Caponegro =

American experimental fiction writer

Mary Caponegro (born November 21, 1956) is an American experimental fiction writer whose collections include Tales from the Next Village, The Star Cafe, Five Doubts, The Complexities of Intimacy, and All Fall Down. Her stories appear regularly in Conjunctions and in other periodicals. She was awarded the Rome Prize in Literature in 1992, and is also the recipient of The General Electric Award for Younger Writers, the Bruno Arcudi Prize, and the Charles Flint Kellog Award in Arts and Letters. She has taught at Brown University, RISD, the Institute of American Indian Arts, Hobart and William Smith Colleges and Syracuse University. She is the Richard B. Fisher Family Professor of Writing and Literature at Bard College. Her work has been praised for its syntactic complexity and its surreal, fabulist content.

== Books ==
- Addressing the Negative (Open Studio, 1981)
- Tales from the Next Village (Lost Roads, 1985)
- The Star Cafe (Scribner, 1990)
- Five Doubts (Marsilio, 1998)
- The Complexities of Intimacy (Coffee House, 2001)
- All Fall Down (Coffee House, 2009)
