= Joshua Lutz =

American academic and photographer (born 1975)

Joshua Lutz (born July 18, 1975) is an American academic and artist, working with large-format photography and with video. He is the head of the photography department and a professor at the State University of New York at Purchase in Purchase, New York.

== Career ==
During the summer of 2004, Lutz was given his first solo exhibition at the Gitterman Gallery in New York City.

In 2008, Lutz's first book, Meadowlands, was published with powerHouse Books. In essayist Robert Sullivan's introduction to the book, he describes the Meadowlands as "… that giant swath of swamp and space that separates New Jersey from New York City, or, put another way, from New York City and the rest of the United States of America." The New Yorker magazine wrote "Joshua Lutz takes the New Topographics of Adams, Shore, and Sternfeld into its current era of urban sprawl."

In the fall of 2008, Lutz had a solo exhibition for the Meadowlands series at the ClampArt Gallery in New York City.

He saw the publication of Hesitating Beauty book in 2013. A series of photographs revealing a different side of Lutz's photography, it tells the story of his mother.

Mind the Gap book, published in 2018, is "an exploration through photographs and text of how our society and the things we experience affect our mental health".

== Publications ==
- Meadowlands. powerHouse, 2008. ISBN 978-1576874424.
- Hesitating Beauty. Schilt, 2013. ISBN 978-9053307762.
- Mind the Gap. Schilt, 2018. ISBN 9789053308943.

== See also ==
- List of American artists 1900 and after
- List of photographers
- List of State University of New York at Purchase people
