= Cyrus Console =

American poet

Cyrus Console (Cyrus Console-Şoican) is an American poet, essayist, and memoirist from Topeka, Kansas. Console studied biology as an undergraduate at the University of Kansas. He also earned an MFA in writing from the Milton Avery Graduate School of the Arts at Bard College and a PhD in literature and creative writing from the University of Kansas. His first book of poetry, Brief Under Water, was published in 2008, and his second book of poetry, The Odicy, appeared in 2011. A memoir, Romanian Notebook, was published in March 2017 by Farrar, Straus and Giroux. Console is currently an assistant professor at the Kansas City Art Institute.

== Bibliography ==
- Console, Cyrus (2008). Brief Under Water. Providence, RI: Burning Deck. ISBN 9781886224872.
- Irby, Kenneth (2009). Waugh, Kyle; Console, Cyrus (eds.). The Intent On: Collected Poems, 1962–2006. Berkeley, CA: North Atlantic Books. ISBN 9781556438332.
- Console, Cyrus (2011). The Odicy. Richmond, CA: Omnidawn. ISBN 9781890650520.
- Ionescu-Quintus, Mircea (2013). The Devil's Grinder. Paula and Cyrus Console-Șoican, trans. Las Vegas, NV: Parmenides. ISBN 9781930972810.
- Console, Cyrus (2017). Romanian Notebook. New York: Farrar, Straus and Giroux. ISBN 9780865478305.
