= Zoe R. Donaldson =

American neuroscientist

Zoe Donaldson
- Born: Reno, Nevada, U.S.
- Education: University of California, Los Angeles; Emory University; Columbia University
- Known for: Using prairie voles to study the neural mechanisms of social behavior
- Awards: 2019 IBANGS Young Scientist Award Edinburgh, 2018 NIH New Innovator Award Recipient, 2009 Robert Wood Johnson Health & Society Scholar, 2003 HHMI Predoctoral Fellowship
- Scientific career
- Fields: Neuroscience
- Workplaces: University of Colorado Boulder

Zoe R. Donaldson is an American neuroscientist and assistant professor at the University of Colorado Boulder. Donaldson explores the neurobiological and genetic mechanisms of social bonding and social behavior in rodents. Her work will help to elucidate how variations in genetics and circuit activity across the population predispose certain individuals to mental illness. Donaldson is a pioneer in the use of the monogamous prairie voles to study social behaviors and has been developing novel genetic tools, since her graduate work at Emory University, to study voles in the lab to better understand the neural circuits underlying pair bonding.

== Early life and education ==
Donaldson was raised in Reno, Nevada. At the age of 16, Donaldson left high school to pursue college level classes at Bard College at Simon's Rock in Great Barrington, Massachusetts. In 2000, she had completed her Associate of Arts Degree and decided to pursue her undergraduate studies at the University of California, Los Angeles. During her time at UCLA, Donaldson travelled to West Africa to study Malaria, and later conducted research under the mentorship of Barney Schlinger. Her research, supported by a Howard Hughes Undergraduate Research Fellowship, focused how androgen steroid signalling impacted courtship behavior in birds. She presented her work at several conferences.

In 2002, Donaldson completed her Bachelors of Science at the age of 21 and decided to pursue her graduate studies at Emory University in Atlanta, Georgia. Donaldson studied under the mentorship of Larry J. Young in the Department of Psychiatry at Emory. She used the monogamous Prairie Vole as a model organism to study the neural correlates of social behavior and the roles of oxytocin and vasopressin in driving social behaviors in these organisms. specifically studied how genetic diversity in the regulatory genetic elements located upstream of the vassopressin receptor gene (VIaR) affect behavior. She first explored variation at the AVPR1A locus in primates and found both single and duplicated alleles of this gene. Following these findings, Donaldson created three mouse lines with which to study variation in the upstream regions of the AVPR1A gene. In addition to her mouse models, Donaldson also created transgenic voles and RNAi technologies with which to probe the implications of variation in this gene on Vole social behavior. Since her tools enable dissection of variations at the level of DNA and RNA and in two different model organisms, her graduate work equipped the field with the ability to probe the role of V1aR in novel and innovative ways. Donaldson later probed the role of V1aR in the formation and expression of partner preferences in voles and found that V1aR is necessary for each of these processes to take place.

Donaldson completed her PhD in Neuroscience in 2009, and moved to New York City to pursue her postdoctoral training at Columbia University under the mentorship of René Hen. In Hen's lab, Donaldson probed the role of the Serotonin 1A autoreceptor in behavior. She first examined how suppression of 5-HT_{1A} signalling in the raphe neurons early in life impacted anxiety and social behaviors. Donaldson found that this early life decrease in 5-HT_{1A} signalling led to increased anxiety and decreased social interaction later in life. After seeing how early life modulation of 5-HT_{1}R signalling impacted behavior later and predisposition to disease-like states, Donaldson then honed in on a specific polymorphism in this 5-HT_{1A}R promoter that had been previously linked with psychiatric diseases. Donaldson found that the rs6295G allele of 5-HT_{1A}R is associated with increased risk for substance abuse, psychiatric hospitalization, and suicide attempts. When they probed the expression of HTR1 in the brains of donors with the allele, they found that patterns of disrupted transcription correlated with depression and suicide.

== Career and research ==
In 2016, Donaldson was recruited to University of Colorado, Boulder and became an assistant professor in the Department of Molecular, Cellular, and Developmental Biology. Donaldson is also affiliated with the Center for Neuroscience as an Assistant Professor of Psychology and Neuroscience. Donaldson is the principal investigator of the Donaldson Lab, where she leads a research program centered around using mice and voles to explore the biological bases of variation in behavior. Donalson's work will help to elucidate why specific genetic or environmental factors increase the likelihood of mental illness in certain individuals. Specifically, Donaldson focuses on how social relationships modulate mood and behavior. She tries to understand how losing a partner, social loss, causes pain and grief at the neural circuit level. One of the main techniques that Donaldson uses to probe neural activity, and its relation to specific genes and behaviors, is in vivo calcium imaging and she also develops novel genetic tools with which to study neural mechanisms in voles.

=== Social buffering ===
Social buffering is a phenomenon in which animals, in the presence of another animal, have attenuated stress and fear responses upon presentation of typically fearful stimuli. Donaldson explored the potential in activating neurons involved in social processing to attenuate fear, mimicking the experience of social buffering. She tagged neural ensembles that were activated upon encoding of a cagemate, and found that reactivation of these social ensembles in fearful contexts attenuated fear responses.

=== Neural correlates of pair bonding ===
Since Donaldson is a pioneer in the use of voles to study social behavior, she wanted to pursue a very fundamental question about the neural mechanisms that drive monogamous voles to form pair bonds. Using in vivo calcium imaging, Donaldson imaged the activity of neurons in the nucleus accumbens during pair bond formation and found that neurons specifically responded to partner approach and that the ensemble of neurons encoding partner approach increased in size over time and predicted the strength of the pair-bond.

== Awards and honors ==
- 2019 IBANGS Young SCientist Award Edinburgh
- 2018 NIH New Innovator Award Recipient
- 2018 National Science Foundation Edge Award
- 2018 Dana Foundation Award - Grant Mahoney Neuroimaging Program
- 2017 Whitehall Foundation Award
- 2009 Robert Wood Johnson Health & Society Scholar
- 2003 HHMI Predoctoral Fellowship
