= Joseph Somers (artist) =

Joseph Somers is an American artist and painter known for his canvases, three-dimensional in both their structure and illusion. Somers opened his first shop in 1989.

His work has been featured at International Art Show Las Vegas and in Home Magazine.

== Personal life ==
Somers was orphaned at a young age and was sent to an orphanage in upstate New York. He dropped out of high school during his teens to join the Army. Somers would go on to complete his high school degree when he was 57, during which time he was diagnosed with a learning disorder.

== Artistic influences and style ==
Somers's art has been influenced by artists such as Vincent van Gogh and Paul Gauguin, as well as Escher and Dali. His style utilizes a technique that Somers uses to create the illusion of three dimensions. For his canvasses Somers utilizes a series of vertical wedges, usually three per work, painted in a realistic style on each side of the wedge. The images are arranged so that, when seen from one point, the images on the various wedges form a realistic whole with slight breaks in the visual field. His furniture is often whimsical with painted surfaces, anthropomorphic legs, and plant-like growths.
