= Archaeocryptography =

Pseudoscientific study of ancient monuments

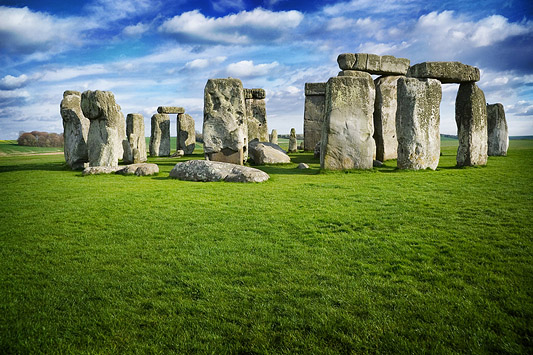
Stonehenge located in Wiltshire, United Kingdom, is one of the world's best known megalithic structures.

Archaeocryptography (from Greek ἀρχαῖος, arkhaios, "ancient" and κρυπτός (kruptós), "hidden, secret"; and γράφειν (graphein), "to write") is the attempt to decode an ancient monument or structure by supposing an underlying mathematical order beneath the proportions, size, and placement to find any re-occurring or unusual data in respect to that which is being studied, or within another monument or structure.

Archaeocryptography is not a recognized branch of archaeology or of any other academic discipline. It is an example of pseudoscience or pseudoarchaeology that employs contrived calculations involving many free parameters to achieve an impressive-looking result.

== Description ==
The word archaeocryptography is derived from archaeology, which is the study of human activity in the past, and cryptography, which is the study of techniques for secure communication in the presence of third parties.

== Methods ==
Mathematical coordinates including π may be used to form Grid Point Values

Archaeocryptologists try to find underlying correlations with respect to what is being studied or decoded. Some factors taken into consideration while deciphering an object, structure or megalithic monument can include the features such as faces, stairs, sides, and terraces. The geolocation or mathematical operations are performed on latitude and longitude coordinates as well as astronomical alignments, such as those found in archaeoastronomy. The incorporation of grids, the use of numerical ordering, mathematical constants, Biblical gematria, and any other re-occurring number that might stand out from the decoding process are determining factors.

Archaeocryptologists can then use different mathematical formulas to find correlations within that which is being studied or between other monuments or structures that share any underlying factors. Popular examples are the Orion correlation theory between the Giza pyramid complex and the three middle stars of the constellation Orion, and also theories about the region of Cydonia on Mars.

== History ==
The coining of the word archaeocryptography is often attributed to Carl P. Munck, who after retiring from the United States military in the late 1970s began studying cartographic material, among other topics, trying to search for better answers as to why certain megalithic monuments exist. This led him to a formula he believes architects used to place and design various megalithic monuments. Munck's theory claims that calculations using selected numbers or dimensions found in megalithic monuments or Egyptian pyramids yield the latitude or longitude of the site. However, in Munck's findings, the prime meridian does not run through Greenwich, but through the Great Pyramid in Giza. His theory is known simply as "The Code" and asserts that an ancient numerological system known as gematria is used in the manipulation of numbers to other key locations, mathematical components and positions of sites in the geometry of their construction.

The theory later become popularized and among other practitioners and researchers in pseudo-scientific fields, such as Michael Lawrence Morton, Richard C. Hoagland, Bruce Cathie, and Hugh Harleston Jr. They adapted archaeocryptography to their own studies, developing different theories and books based on the topic.

== In literary studies ==
The marginal, or even fictional, status of archaeocryptography was suggested in Zachary Mason's novel The Lost Books of the Odyssey, which purports to be a collection of lost works which the author describes as being as old as the Odyssey and which he claims to have decoded from a manuscript he had uncovered. In the author's biography at the conclusion of the book he describes himself as "the John Shade Professor of Archaeocryptography and Paleomathematics at Magdalen College, Oxford". The "lost books" were actually written by Mason and, as reviewers have noted, Mason is a novelist and computer scientist who lives in California, John Shade is a fictional poet in Vladimir Nabokov's Pale Fire, and no such professorship exists.

== See also ==
- Pyramid (geometry)
- Geometry
- Metrology
- Numerology
- Cartography
- Paleomagnetism
- Geomathematics
- Geotargeting
- Global Positioning System
