= Elizabeth Blodgett Hall =

American school administrator (1909–2005)

- Born: November 16, 1909; New York City, New York, U.S.
- Died: July 18, 2005 (aged 95); New Canaan, Connecticut, U.S.
- Education: Miss Hall's School; Radcliffe College
- Occupations: College president, educator
- Known for: Founder of Simon's Rock at Bard College
- Spouse: Livingston Hall

Elizabeth "Betty" Blodgett Hall (November 16, 1909 – July 18, 2005) was an administrator of both secondary and college level institutions. She was a pioneer and innovator of the 'early college' model of post-secondary education.

== Early life ==
Hall was born on November 16, 1909, in New York City, New York as the only child of Thomas Harper Blodgett and Margaret Carroll Kendrick. As a young girl she attended the Ethical Culture School, before her family moved to the Berkshire Hills of western Massachusetts. Hall was raised in Great Barrington, and in 1928 she graduated from Miss Hall's School in nearby Pittsfield.

In 1928, Hall attended her father's alma mater, Knox College, for one year. While raising her four children and commuting from the suburbs, she became one of the first older adults to study at Radcliffe College, where she graduated in 1946.

== Career ==
From 1949 to 1963 she was headmistress for Concord Academy, an independent college preparatory school in Concord, Massachusetts. During her time there, Mrs. Hall was responsible for developing Concord Academy into a demanding college preparatory school.

In 1964 on the grounds of her family's Great Pine Farm, Hall founded Simon's Rock with financial support from a family foundation established by her mother. The school was designed as an early college, accepting students coming from their sophomore or junior years of high school and usually before receiving high school diplomas. The first class at Simon's Rock entered in 1966. Hall served as the school's president from 1964 to 1972. In 1979 Simon's Rock became affiliated with Bard College. Hall served on the Simon's Rock Board of Overseers and the Board of Trustees of Bard College. In 1996 she was named an emerita member of both boards.

== Personal life ==
On September 13, 1930, Hall married Livingston Hall at St. James Episcopal Church in Great Barrington, Massachusetts. They had four children. Hall died July 18, 2005, at the age of 95 in Canaan, Connecticut.

== Legacy ==
Hall earned a reputation as a capable educational administrator and pioneered an innovative and sustainable institution. In recognition for her leadership at Concord Academy and Simon's Rock, Hall received the Distinguished Alumna Award from Miss Hall's School, "for the leadership to guide a fledgling girls' school from obscurity to national prominence, for the vision to create a new and almost totally original institution, for the dedication, perseverance, and philanthropic commitment to turn that dream into a reality, and for her devotion to the betterment of young people."
