= Livingston Hall =

- Born: May 5, 1903; Chicago, Illinois
- Died: November 18, 1995 (aged 92); Great Barrington, Massachusetts
- Occupation: Roscoe Pound Professor of Law
- Spouse: Elizabeth Blodgett Hall

Livingston Hall (May 5, 1903 – November 18, 1995) was most notably the Roscoe Pound Professor of Law at Harvard Law School. He graduated from Harvard Law in 1927 before working in private practice and as a US Attorney. Hall returned to Harvard and began teaching in 1932. He retired in 1971.

During World War II, Hall served in the Army as a lieutenant colonel. He received the Congressional Medal of Freedom in 1946. In 1985, the ABA established the Livingston Hall Juvenile Justice Award due to Hall's efforts in the area of juvenile law.

During Hall's career, he participated in a number of committees and studies. A collection of over 3000 papers has been assembled and made available for study.

Hall was married to Elizabeth Blodgett Hall, founder of Simon's Rock College.

== Sources ==
- Saxon, Wolfgang (November 22, 1995). "Livingston Hall, 92, Former Vice Dean At Harvard Law". The New York Times.
- ABA Livingston Hall Juvenile Justice Award
