= Shalako =

Zuni ceremonial dance

Shalako is a series of dances and ceremonies conducted by the Native American Zuni people for the Zuni people at the winter solstice, typically following the harvest. The Shalako ceremony and feast has been closed to non-native peoples since 1990.

Nancy Bonvillain described the Shalakos, "They brought good fortune, abundant crops, and many children." They are chosen at Winter Solstice, when they begin to learn the chants they will recite in the early December ceremony.

== The Koyemshi ==
Nine offspring and the father, Awan Tatchu, constitute the Koyemshi of Zuni mythology, who accompany and interpret the kachinas. The children have characteristics of their father, dun-colored and marked with welts, they include Awan Pekwin (Priest-speaker of the Sun), Awan Pithlashiwanni (Bow Priest-warrior), Eshotsi (the Bat), Itsepasha (the Glum or Aggrieved), Kalutsi (the Suckling), Tsathlashi (Old-youth), Muyapona (Wearer of the Eyelets of Invisibility), Posuki (the Pouter), and Nalashi (Aged Buck).

== Council of the Gods ==
Shulawitsi, Little Fire God, and his father, Shulawatsi An Tatchu, precede the Shalako. Shulawitsi, portrayed by a young boy carrying cedar bark torches, lights preparatory fires. They are followed by Saiyatasha or Longhorn, Rain Priest of the North, and Hututu, Rain Priest of the South, accompanied by a Yamuhakto, their helpers. All are protected by the Salimopia, Warriors of the Six Directions. They are called Salimopia Shelow'ona (from the south), Salimopia Kohan'ona (from the east), Salimopia Thlian'ona (from the west), Salimopia Thluptsin'ona (from the north), Salimopia Shikan'ona (from the nadir), and Salimopia Itapanahnan'ona (from the zenith).

== The Shalako ==
Each kiva selects two men, one to portray one of the six Shalakos, and one who alternates in the role, the Shalako Anuthlona. They appear after the Council of the Gods complete their journey around the village at dusk. They approach the village from the south, coming down Greasy Hill. Each Shalako enters their designated house, and chants commence recounting the creation of the Zuni, and their search for the Middle. After midnight, a feast is consumed by all, followed with dancing by the Shalako. The ceremony finishes at dawn when Saiyatasha completes his final prayer.

== Additional reading ==
- Charles Francis Saunders, The Indians of the Terraced Houses, Chapter XVI: Of the Night Dance of the Shálako Gods, pp. 153–166. G.P. Putnam's Sons, 1912.

== See also ==
- Dance Hall of the Dead
