= Void Star =

2017 novel by Zachary Mason

- Author: Zachary Mason
- Publisher: Farrar, Straus and Giroux
- Publication date: April 2017
- Pages: 400
- ISBN: 978-0-374-28506-7

Void Star is a 2017 near-future science fiction novel by American writer Zachary Mason. It is his second novel, published after The Lost Books of the Odyssey. Set in a near-future San Francisco, the book explores themes of artificial intelligence, philosophy, linguistics and immortality.

== Plot ==
The plot revolves around three protagonists: Irina, a corporate consultant, who translates AI "glyphs," or waves of thought, for other people to understand; Thales, the son of a Brazilian politician; and Kern, petty thief raised in the favelas and self-taught martial artist. They are brought together when Irina and Thales, both of whom have cranial implants that enable perfect memory recall, learn that the contents of these implants can be exfiltrated.

== Reception ==
Wired praised the book for being "written with the syntactic precision you might expect from a linguist, a computer scientist, a mathematician. Or a person who is all three" but criticized the "plot [that] may leave you scratching your head." The Guardian criticized the chapters set in virtual reality, writing that "as its storylines converge in virtual spaces, everything begins to seem ethereally confusing and abstract," but praises the other chapters, with their return "in the most satisfying of the various characters’ endings, to the physical realities of fire and steel."
