= Alberta Devor =

American comedian and software engineer

- Devor in 2026
- Born: Brooklyn, New York, US

Instagram information
- Page: Alberta Tech
- Years active: 2022–present
- Followers: 321K

Substack information
- Newsletter: Computers were a mistake
- Notes: @albertatech
- Years active: 2025–present
- Subscribers: 3.3K+

TikTok information
- Page: Alberta Tech
- Followers: 175.2K

X information
- Handle: @albertadevs
- Display name: Alberta Tech
- Years active: 2015–present
- Followers: 21K

YouTube information
- Channel: Alberta Tech
- Years active: 2023–present
- Subscribers: 476K
- Views: 510M
- Last updated: September 25, 2026
- Website: albertatech.co

Alberta Devor, also known online as alberta.nyc and Alberta Tech, is an American comedian and software engineer who posts educational and satirical videos about technology and artificial intelligence.

== Early life and education ==
Alberta Devor was born and grew up in Brooklyn, New York City. She attended P.S. 58 The Carroll School in Carroll Gardens, then Bard High School Early College in Manhattan, graduating in 2015.

After high school, Devor attended Brown University. She says she was not sure she would be interested in computer science when she took her first class in college; however, when that class included a musical theatre performance teaching about object-oriented programming, she knew she wanted to be in that show. Two years later she was directing the show as a teaching assistant, four years later she graduated with a degree in the field, and nearly a decade later she still makes skits about programming.

== Career ==
Devor as "Clawdbot", in 2026

After graduation, Devor worked for Google as a software engineer for over six years. She first worked on Google Maps data infrastructure, then on YouTube Labs features.

In 2020, Devor was bored due to the COVID-19 lockdowns, so she began making and posting comedy TikTok videos. Initially she satirized daily life during the lockdown, but then switched to making funny videos about working in technology companies. Starting in 2022, she began making both educational and satirical videos about artificial intelligence and the boom of generative AI. Devor says that she loves both comedy and education, and is especially happy using comedy to educate. Initially she kept her full name secret, and posted only as alberta.nyc.

In the fall of 2022, one of her TikTok videos, in which she pretended she was being laid off from Snap Inc. during the tech company's 20% layoffs, went viral, with viewers being split between those realizing it was satirical and those believing it to be real. In 2023, when Google itself had mass layoffs of 12,000 employees, Devor posted a video in support of the Alphabet Workers Union. She used her full name to lead a public union demonstration against the layoffs in front of the Google Store in New York City.

Devor as tech company planning poker champion, in 2025

More popular alberta.nyc videos were released in 2024, including a story about how Amazon.com, Inc. criticized workers for overusing its "Daily Fruit Program", and an explanation of why AI models couldn't answer how many "r"s were in the word "strawberry". Others were more personal, such as a two-part story about how she was defrauded by a teledentistry scam, and not supported by her own insurance company. Yet others were about the intersection of personal life and AI, such as one about how a likely AI decision made Uber Eats deliver her a pregnancy test instead of a COVID test.

By 2026, Devor had over 161,000 followers on TikTok, 278,000 followers on Instagram, and 433,000 subscribers on YouTube, and was interviewed about AI by international outlets like Usercentrics, the BBC, and The Guardian. In May 2026, she left Google to become a full-time content creator as "Alberta Tech".
