= Bard Academy =

Coordinates: 42.209581°N 73.380432°W

Bard Academy at Simon's Rock
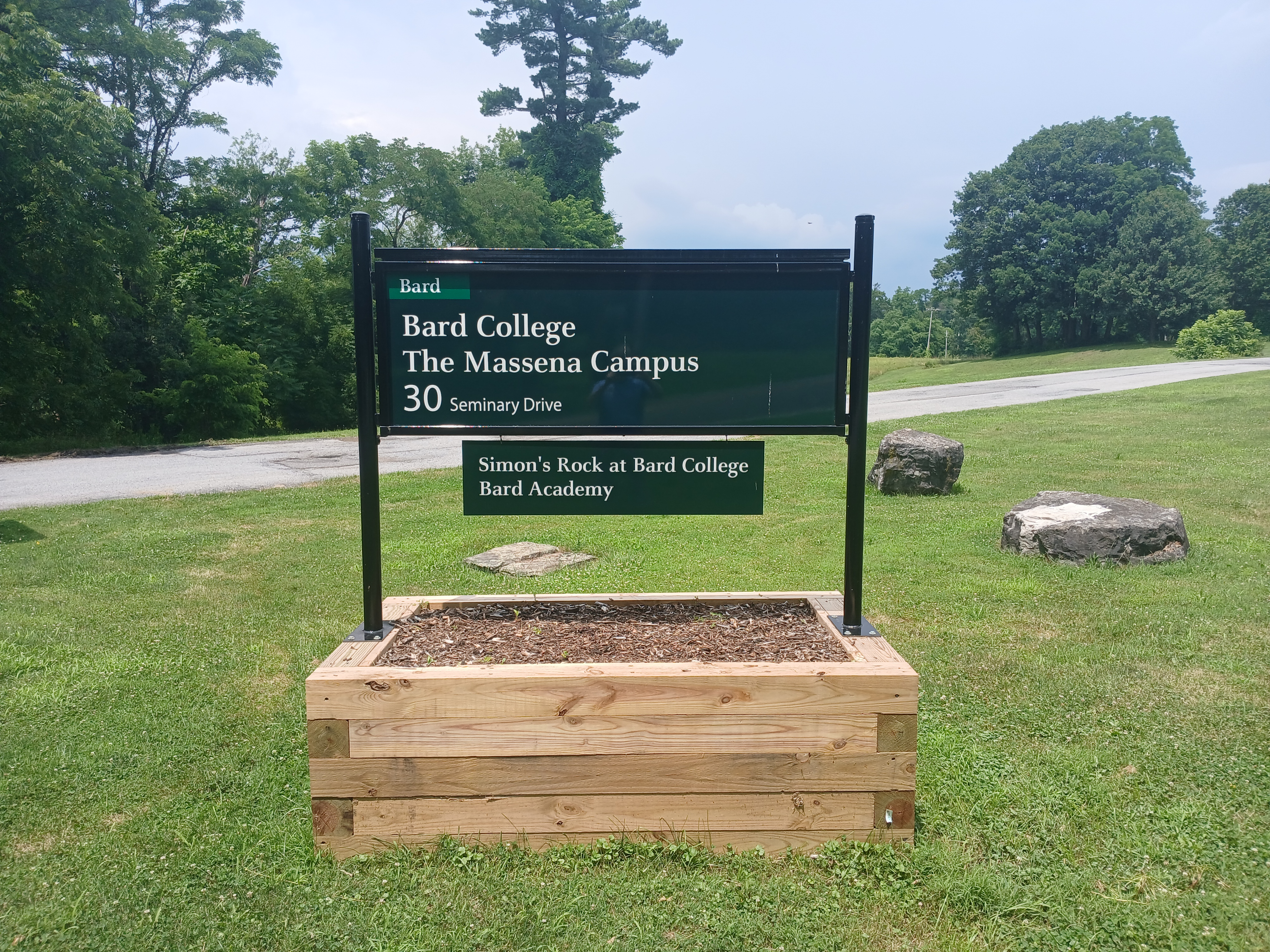

Location
- 30 Seminary Drive; Barrytown, Dutchess, New York 12507; United States

Information
- Type: Independent, College-prep, Day & Boarding
- CEEB code: 220912
- President: Leon Botstein
- Provost and Vice President: Ian Bickford
- Faculty: 50
- Grades: 9-10
- Gender: Coeducational
- Enrollment: 43 Students; 79% Boarding (2017)
- Average class size: 15
- Student to teacher ratio: 8:1
- Campus size: 275 acres (1.11 km^{2})
- Campus type: Rural
- Tuition: $51,944 Day; $72,634 Boarding (2025)
- Feeder to: Simon's Rock at Bard College
- Website: simons-rock.edu/academy/index.php

Bard Academy is a private, co-ed boarding school for grades 9 through 10 located in Barrytown, New York. It was formerly located in Great Barrington, Massachusetts, USA until summer 2025. Students finish high school in two years, and after 10th grade, students have guaranteed admission to early college at Simon's Rock at Bard College. Students at Bard Academy are taught by the same professors as Simon's Rock. Together the programs create a six-year course of study, consisting of three two-year programs: Bard Academy, the A.A. degree, and the B.A. degree. Students can enter at the academy or A.A. sections. Some students transfer after the A.A. degree, while others stay for the B.A. Ian Bickford, a graduate of Bard College at Simon's Rock, is the founding dean of Bard Academy and was appointed provost of Bard College at Simon's Rock in 2016.

== Two-year high school ==
Bard Academy is a new pedagogical model where students complete high school in two years. Then after high school, students earn an A.A. degree when the typical student would be graduating from high school. Bard Academy is accredited by the New England Association of Schools and Colleges, which means that it is not required to follow the Common Core curriculum. Also, since early college admission is built into the curriculum, Bard Academy students typically don't take standardized tests or focus on college admission applications.
