= Julie Introcaso =

American judge

Julie Ann Introcaso
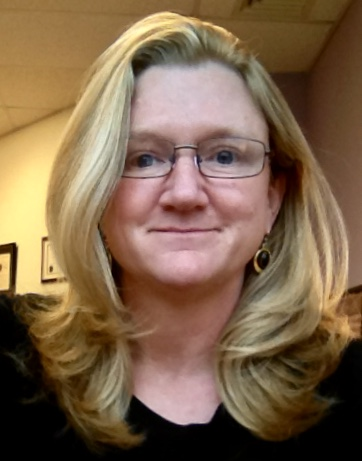

Circuit Court Judge
- In office August 22, 2012 – February 16, 2021
- Nominated by: John Lynch
- Preceded by: Vacancy

Disciplinary Counsel, New Hampshire Supreme Court
- In office June 2011 – September 2012
- Preceded by: Jennifer Brooke Sargent
- Succeeded by: Sara S. Greene

Deputy Clerk, Superior Court
- In office 2000–2011

Personal details
- Born: 1964 (age 61–62) Rochester, New York, U.S.
- Spouse: Attorney Anthony L. Introcaso

Julie A. Introcaso (born 1964) is a former judge of the New Hampshire Circuit Court. She was arrested on February 11, 2021, on two felony charges of falsifying physical evidence, two misdemeanor charges of tampering with public records, and a misdemeanor charge of unsworn falsification. She resigned her position as a judge on February 16, 2021. On February 25, 2022, she was disbarred from the practice of law.

== Early life, education and legal career ==
Julie Ann Introcaso (née Johnson) received her Bachelor of Arts degree, cum laude, from Bard College at Simon's Rock in 1985. She was 20 years of age. She received her Juris Doctor degree, with honors, from Boston University School of Law in 1988.

After graduating from law school, Introcaso pursued criminal defense work as a staff attorney at New Hampshire Public Defender, and later entered private practice in Manchester. From 2000 through 2011, she served as a Deputy Clerk of the New Hampshire Superior Court in Brentwood, New Hampshire (Rockingham County). In June 2011, she became Disciplinary Counsel for the New Hampshire Supreme Court's Attorney Discipline Office (ADO).

In May 1998, she was one of the five founding members of the New Hampshire Women's Bar Association.

Introcaso served as Chair of the New Hampshire Board of Mental Health Practice, the first public member to hold the position. She was also appointed public member of the New Hampshire Board of Speech-Language Pathology where she served until her appointment to judicial office.

== New Hampshire Circuit Court judge ==
Julie Introcaso was nominated on August 8, 2012, by New Hampshire Governor John Lynch to serve on the state's Circuit Court. She was confirmed on August 22, 2012, by the state's Executive Council.

== Resignation ==
On February 16, 2021, Introcaso resigned her position as a New Hampshire Circuit Court judge. She also entered into a Stipulation and Agreement with the New Hampshire Judicial Conduct Committee that she had violated a number of provisions of the New Hampshire Code of Judicial Conduct.

== Ethics ==
Between 2013 and 2018, Julie Introcaso appointed Attorney Kathleen Sternenberg, with whom Introcaso maintained a "long-standing close friendship", as guardian ad litem in at least eight different family law cases. In October 2020, the New Hampshire Judicial Conduct Committee announced it was bringing forward a disciplinary matter against Introcaso for failing to recuse herself, and alleged that Introcaso committed judicial misconduct. She was also ordered by the New Hampshire Supreme Court to cover the cost of the investigation into her conduct.

== Criminal case ==
In October 2020, the Office of the New Hampshire Attorney General opened a criminal investigation into Introcaso's conduct, and alleged that Introcaso altered court paperwork with white out while she was being investigated by the New Hampshire Judicial Conduct Committee. On February 11, 2021, prior to the scheduled hearing on the judicial conduct allegations against her, Introcaso was arrested as a result of the criminal investigation.

Introcaso was charged with two class B felony counts of falsifying physical evidence (NH Rev Stat § 641:6), two class A misdemeanor counts of tampering with public records or information (NH Rev Stat § 641:7), and one class A misdemeanor count of unsworn falsification (NH Rev Stat § 641:3). On March 17, 2021, the New Hampshire Supreme Court received a filing from the New Hampshire Supreme Court's Attorney Discipline Office (ADO) which included copies of the criminal complaints. On March 24, 2021, Introcaso was immediately suspended from the practice of law in New Hampshire on a temporary basis pending further order of the New Hampshire Supreme Court.

On November 15, 2021, Introcaso entered an Alford plea to two misdemeanor counts of tampering with public records and one misdemeanor count of submitting false statements, without admitting to the truth of the charges. She received a suspended 12-month jail sentence and 100 hours of community service. In his ruling, Judge Charles Temple noted that Introcaso's crimes "eviscerated" the public trust in family courts and the legal system generally.

== Disbarment ==
On February 25, 2022, Introcaso did not contest a petition for her disbarment. Correspondingly, she was disbarred from the practice of law.
