= Matthew J. DeGennaro =

American mosquito scientist born 1975)

- Born: September 3, 1975 (age 51); The Bronx, New York
- Education: Bard College at Simon’s Rock
- Spouse: Christian Larsen (div. 2015) Alejandro Acuna ()
- Scientific career
- Fields: Neurobiology and Immunology
- Workplaces: Florida International University (FIU)
- Doctoral advisor: Ruth Lehmann
- Other academic advisors: Leslie B. Vosshall
- Website: www.degennarolab.org

Matthew DeGennaro (born 1975) is an American scientist who seeks to identify mosquito olfactory receptors used in human detection and formulate new volatiles that can effectively disrupt mosquito behavior. DeGennaro is credited with generating the first mutant mosquito utilizing zinc finger nucleases, and he is now working on formulating a “life saving perfume” that can deter these vectors for disease. He has been published in Nature, Developmental Cell, Current Biology, PLOS Genetics, and the Journal of Biological Chemistry.

== Early life ==
DeGennaro was born in the Bronx in New York City on September 3, 1975. He grew up in the suburbs of New York with his working-class family. DeGennaro's father, Robert DeGennaro, was an elevator mechanic; and his mother, Lorraine Zoppie, was a legal secretary.

== Education ==
DeGennaro obtained his primary education at Valley Cottage Elementary School, and then pursued his secondary education at North Rockland High School.

At the age of 15, he was recruited by Bard College at Simon's Rock due to his scores on the Preliminary Scholastic Aptitude Test (PSAT). After receiving his Associate of Arts Degree in the Natural Sciences in May 1993, he transferred to Bard's College Main Campus. During his time on main campus, he earned his Bachelor of Arts in History and Philosophy of Science and Gender Studies in May 1996, as well as completed all required pre-med courses.

Following graduation, DeGennaro originally planned to attend medical school. Although after being waitlisted, he withdrew his applications and moved back to New York City to continue to conduct research. DeGennaro earned his PhD in Developmental Genetics in May 2008 at the New York University School of Medicine.

== Research ==
DeGennaro's first lab experience was in the Environmental Medicine Center at the New York University School of Medicine, where he served as a research associate. During the summer of 1992, he researched the retinoblastoma gene in mice, which functions as a tumor suppressor.

Within a week of his graduation from Bard's College Main Campus, he negotiated a job at the Oral AIDS Center in the Department of Stomatology at the University of California, San Francisco. While working under Joel Palefsky, he conducted investigations regarding Hairy leukoplakia, an epithelial growth of the Epstein–Barr virus that is associated with Acquired Immunodeficiency Syndrome (AIDS).

In 1998, DeGennaro was offered a position working in Steven Siegelbaum's laboratory in the Center for Neurobiology and Behavior at Columbia University’s Howard Hughes Medical Institute (HHMI). Under Siegelbaum, he studied HCN ion channel biophysics and second-authored a paper published in Nature, titled “Molecular mechanism of cAMP modulation of HCN pacemaker channels.”

For five months in 2000, DeGennaro continued his HCN ion channel studies as a research associate under Gareth Tibbs in the Department of Pharmacology at Columbia University.

Following his time at Columbia, DeGennaro shifted his research focus from neurobiology to immunology. In August 2000, he got a job at the Skirball Institute of Biomolecular Medicine in Dan Littman's Laboratory as a Lab Manager. During his time in Littman's Lab, he investigated the role of PKC theta in insulin signaling.

In August 2002, DeGennaro enrolled at the New York University School of Medicine to pursue his PhD. He worked at the Skirball Institute of Biomolecular Medicine as a Doctoral Student under Ruth Lehmann. DeGennaro was trained to be a Drosophila geneticist, like his mentor, and researched the connection between reactive oxygen species and the regulation of E-Cadherin, an adhesion molecule. He also performed a reverse genetic screen of the germline-expressed peroxidase gene, which he discovered would impact adhesion if its function was lost. His research, “Peroxiredoxin stabilization of DE-cadherin promotes primordial germ cell adhesion” was published in Developmental Cell in 2011.

== Career ==
After conducting developmental genetics research, DeGennaro shifted his studies back toward neurobiology. DeGennaro graduated in May 2008 and acquired a position in Leslie B. Vosshall's Laboratory of Neurogenetics and Behavior at The Rockefeller University. While working as a postdoctoral research associate, DeGennaro made the first mutant mosquito with the genome editing reagent, zinc finger nucleases, and tested its role in host-seeking behavior. DeGennaro also determined molecular mechanisms that could be targeted to control mosquito behavior, as well as generated a neurotranscriptome of Aedes aegypti.

In 2013, DeGennaro first-authored a paper titled “orco mutant mosquitoes lose strong preference for humans and are not repelled by volatile DEET,” which was published in Nature. He studied the olfactory and contact-mediated impacts of DEET on mosquito repellency, as well as investigating host preference and discrimination in Aedes aegypti. DeGennaro discovered that orco mutants had dampened responses to odors, such as nectar, in the absence of carbon dioxide; but, when carbon dioxide was present, host attraction was recovered in mutants.

In 2014, DeGennaro moved to Miami and accepted a position at the Florida International University (FIU). He is the principal investigator in the Laboratory of Tropical Genetics at FIU and focuses primarily on mosquito research. The DeGennaro Lab seeks to determine the odors and olfactory receptors that contribute to host detection in mosquitoes, analyze nectar-seeking behavior and examine vector ecology. DeGennaro also intends to establish a model for coral symbiosis and chemosensation using the upside-down jellyfish, Cassiopea xamachana, in order to study new mechanisms of coral bleaching.

DeGennaro's previous orco research prompted the lab's investigation into the mechanism behind carbon dioxide detection, which could evidently make up for the loss of function in odorant receptors. Research concerning the IR8 pathway in Aedes aegypti revealed that the mosquitoes could still sense carbon dioxide and heat emitted by hosts, but they were unable to detect acidic volatiles, specifically lactic acid. This demonstrated that the IR8 pathway is necessary for host detection, as well as helped to understand the mosquito's "olfactory code", which consists of carbon dioxide, odor and acidic volatile detection. In 2019, “Aedes aegypti Mosquitoes Detect Acidic Volatiles Found in Human Odor Using the IR8a Pathway,” was published in Current Biology, as well as covered in The New York Times.

== Other work ==
Matthew DeGennaro acted in the film El Ultimo Balsero.

== Selected publications ==
- Marrero, K.M., Castillo, J.S., Lucas-Barbosa, D., Bellantuono, A.J., Marrero, M.A., Cid, D., Costa-da-Silva, A.L., Verhulst, N.O., & DeGennaro, M. (2026) Individual humans are more attractive to certain mosquito species. iScience 29, 8, 117006.
- Costa-da-Silva, A.L., Cabal, S., Lopez, K., Boloix, J., Garcia, B.R., Marrero, K.M., Bellantuono, A.J., & DeGennaro, M. (2024) Female Aedes aegypti mosquitoes use communal cues to manage population density at breeding sites. Communications Biology 7, 143.
- Barredo, E & DeGennaro, M. (2020) Not just from blood: Mosquito nutrient acquisition from nectar sources. Trends in Parasitology
- Melo., N., Wolff, G., H., Costa-da-Silva, A., L., Arribas, R., Triana, M., F., Gugger, M., Riffell, J., A., DeGennaro M., & Stensmyr, M. C. (2020) Geosmin attracts Aedes aegypti mosquitoes to oviposition sites. Current Biology 30; 1–8.
- Raji, JI, Gonzalez, S, and DeGennaro, M. (2019) Aedes aegypti Ir8a mutant female mosquitoes show increased attraction to standing water. Communicative & Integrative Biology 12:1, 181–186.
- Raji, J., Melo, N., Castillo, J., Gonzalez, S., Saldana, V., Stensmyr, M., & DeGennaro, M. (2019) Aedes aegypti mosquitoes detect acidic volatiles in found human odor sing the IR8a Pathway. Current Biology.
- Joshua I. Raji & DeGennaro, M. (2017) Genetic analysis of mosquito detection of humans. Curr. Opin. Ins. Sci. 20, 34–38.
- Matthews, B., McBride, C., DeGennaro, M., Despo O. & Vosshall, L. B. (2016) The neurotranscriptome of the Aedes aegypti mosquito. BMC Genomics 17:32.
- DeGennaro, M. (2015) The mysterious multi-modal repellency of DEET. Fly. 9:1, 45–51.
- DeGennaro, M., McBride, C., Seeholzer, L., Nakagawa, T., Dennis, E.J., Goldman, C., Jasinskiene, N., James, A. A., & Vosshall, L. B. (2013) orco mutant mosquitoes lose strong preference for humans and are not repelled by volatile DEET. Nature 498; 487–491.
- DeGennaro, M., Hurd, T. Siekhaus, D., Biteau, B., Jasper, H., & Lehmann, R. (2011) Peroxiredoxin stabilization of DE-cadherin promotes primordial germ cell adhesion. Developmental Cell 20, 233-243.
