= Solange Ashby =

Egyptologist and Nubiology scholar

- Occupations: Africanist, archaeologist

Academic background
- Education: University of Chicago; Bard College
- Thesis: Calling Out to Isis: The Enduring Nubian Presence at Philae (2016)

Academic work
- Institutions: UCLA; Barnard College; American University

Solange Ashby is an Africanist and archaeologist whose expertise focuses on language, religion and the role of women in ancient Egypt and Nubia. She is an assistant professor in the Department of Near Eastern Languages and Cultures at the University of California, Los Angeles.

== Career ==
Ashby studied for a B.A. in Intercultural Studies at Bard College at Simon's Rock. She graduated with a PhD in Egyptology from the University of Chicago. Her doctoral research took place at the temple of Philae in Egypt, as well as excavating at the Kushite cemetery of El-Kurru in Sudan. Her research examined the inscriptions, including graffiti, made by Kushite visitors, who traveled to the Egyptian temples in Lower Nubia.

In January 2021 she took up a position in the Department of Classics and Ancient Studies at Barnard College, New York, as an adjunct professor. In 2023 she went on to become an assistant professor in the Department of Near Eastern Languages and Cultures at the University of California, Los Angeles. She has held fellowships at the Catholic University's Institute of Christian Oriental Research and the American Research Centre in Egypt and has taught at the American University in Washington.

In 2020, Ashby co-founded the William Leo Hansberry Society, an interdisciplinary organization seeking to address racial inequities within the field of Egyptology and the study of African antiquity more broadly.

=== Media ===
In 2018, Ashby featured in a documentary directed by Taaqiy Grant, which looked at many aspects of Ancient Egyptian civilization, including its barter-based economic system. In 2020, she featured in the film series Hapi, which focused on the role of economics in civilization.

== Publications ==
- New Perspectives on Ancient Nubia (2024)
- Calling Out To Isis: the Enduring Nubian Presence at Philae (2020)
- "Milk Libations for Osiris: Nubian Piety at Philae" in Near Eastern Archaeology (2019)
- "Dancing for Hathor: Nubian Women in Egyptian Cultic Life" in Dotawo: A Journal of Nubian Studies (2018)
- "Meroitic Worship of Isis at Philae" (2011)
