= Bard High School Early College =

Public school in New York City

BHSEC Manhattan
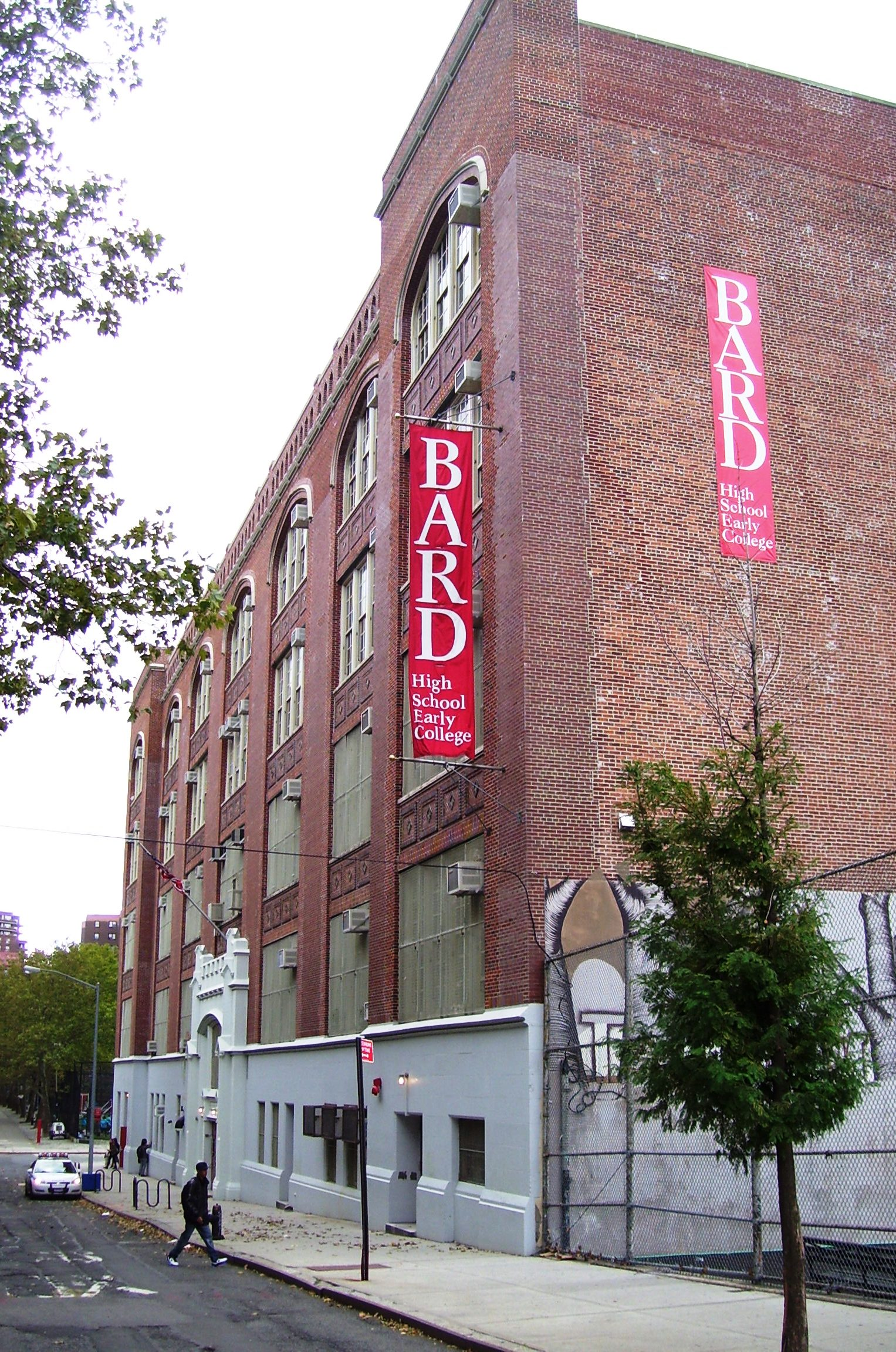
- Bard High School Early College's Manhattan location at 525 E Houston St.

Location
- 40°43′7.205″N 73°58′33.125″W

Information
- Motto: A Place to Think
- Established: 2001
- School district: 24
- President: Jonathan Becker (acting)
- Grades: 9–12
- Enrollment: ~3,000
- Campus: Urban
- Colors: Black, white, and red
- Newspaper: The Bardvark, The Underground (Manhattan Campus), BQ Broadside, The Quill (Queens campus)
- Affiliations: Bard College, Bard College at Simon's Rock, NYC Department of Education
- Website: www.bard.edu/earlycollege

Bard High School Early College (BHSEC) is a system of early college schools with multiple campuses in the United States, enrolling approximately 3,000 students across all campuses. The schools allow students to begin their college studies two years early, graduating with a Bard College Associate in Arts degree in addition to their high school diploma. Students complete their high school studies in the ninth and tenth grade, after which they begin taking credit-bearing college courses under the same roof. Unlike some dual-enrollment programs, students stay on the same campus for all four years, and both high school- and college-level courses are taught by the same faculty. Teachers at the Bard High School Early Colleges are both certified public school teachers as well as experienced academic scholars, often holding terminal degrees in their areas of study.

The first campus, Bard High School Early College Manhattan, opened in New York City in 2001 as a partnership between Bard College and various local public school systems. There are now eight Bard High School Early College campuses across the country.

The Bard High School Early Colleges are part of a larger network of early college programs run by Bard College, called the Bard Early Colleges, which also include half-day programs in New Orleans, Louisiana; in partnership with the Harlem Children's Zone in New York City; and in Hudson, New York.

== Admissions ==
Applicants must maintain a B letter grade of 85 percent or higher to be considered. Bard has its own academic standards, and if a student meets them, they will be called to a one-on-one interview. In advance of their opening in the Bronx, the school's admissions and diversity practices were called into question. This had been an issue in D.C., including addressing the city's brain drain.

== History ==
Founded in 2001 as a partnership of the New York City Department of Education and Bard College and funded in part by the Bill and Melinda Gates Foundation, Bard High School Early College Manhattan was the first public Bard Early College with other foundations following. But the early college model and many of the teaching philosophies employed at the Bard Early Colleges were primarily developed at Bard College at Simon's Rock, the oldest early college entrance program and only accredited four-year early college to date.

As of 2023, over 4,000 A.A. degrees have been awarded at BHSEC campuses. The schools have a 98% high school graduation rate and a 95% A.A. degree attainment rate. Many BHSEC graduates transfer their 60+ college credits to another college or university and finish their Bachelor of Arts (B.A.) degree in two more years; others opt to study for three or four years in their subsequent institutions.

== School structure ==
By the end of their time at a BHSEC program, students have the ability to earn up to 60 Bard College credits.

== Campuses ==
=== Bard High School Early Colleges (4-year) ===
- Bard High School Early College Bronx
- Bard High School Early College Manhattan
- Bard High School Early College Queens
- Bard High School Early College Newark
- Bard High School Early College Cleveland
- Bard High School Early College Baltimore
- Bard High School Early College DC
- Bard High School Early College Brooklyn

=== Other Bard Early College programs (Half-day) ===
- Bard Early College New Orleans
- Bard Early College at the Harlem Children's Zone
- Bard Early College Hudson

== Recognition ==
In 2009, President Barack Obama mentioned BHSEC as a possibility for future education in his Centennial Speech to the NAACP.

== Notable alumni ==
- Audrey Gelman
- Henry Kessler
- Alex Muyl
- Alberta Devor

== See also ==
- Education in New York City
