= Simon's Rock at Bard College =

Liberal arts college in Barrytown, New York, United States

Coordinates: 42.003°N 73.924°W

- School seal
- Type: Private liberal arts college
- Established: 1964
- Parent institution: Bard College
- President: Jonathan Becker (acting)
- Provost: John B. Weinstein
- Faculty: 20 FT/ 5 PT
- Students: 90 (2026)
- Location: Barrytown, New York, United States
- Campus: Rural
- Mascot: Llama
- Website: simons-rock.edu

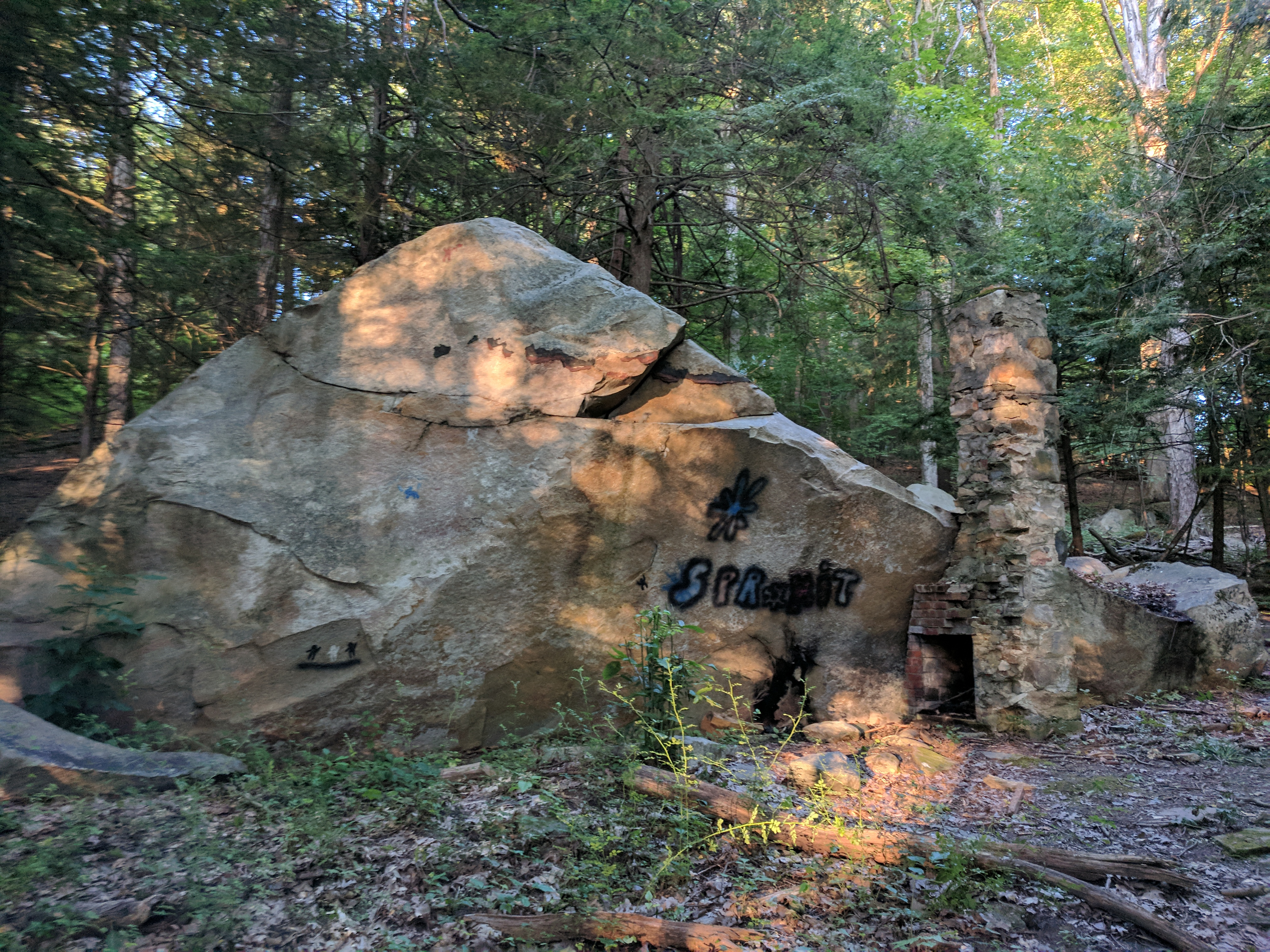
Simon's Rock at the college's former location in Great Barrington

Simon's Rock at Bard College, commonly called Simon's Rock, is a private liberal arts college in Barrytown, New York. It is part of, and adjacent to, Bard College in neighboring Annandale-on-Hudson. Both are in the town of Red Hook.

The school is an early college where students enroll after tenth or eleventh grade, rather than after graduating from high school. That is, it is an early college entrance program. Most students transfer to larger institutions after receiving an Associate of Arts degree in two years, although many stay for two additional years to receive a Bachelor of Arts at Bard College.

The college has had many names: Simon's Rock, Simon's Rock Early College, Simon's Rock of Bard College for a period after 1979, when it was acquired by Bard College, and Simon's Rock College of Bard. In August 2007, it changed to Bard College at Simon's Rock, in an effort "to be more clear about identity" and "to be very clear about the Bard College system." It adopted its current name, Simon's Rock at Bard College, in 2025, when it moved from Massachusetts to New York.

== History ==
=== Massachusetts (1964–2025) ===
Simon's Rock was officially founded in 1964 and located on a 275-acre (1.1-km²) campus in Great Barrington, in the Berkshires region of Massachusetts, until summer 2025.

The name "Simon's Rock" comes from a large rock, a glacial erratic, in the woods on the campus, a short walk from the main part of the original Massachusetts campus. At the time that Simon's Rock earned its name, in the early 1920s, the woods that now surround it were part of the vast area of land called Great Pine Farm. The rock was a favorite spot for people who lived nearby, especially children. One neighborhood child, a little girl named Simon, claimed the rock as her own.

The college's founder, Elizabeth Blodgett Hall, had formerly been headmistress at Concord Academy, a private girls' school. She concluded from her experience, and that of her colleagues, that for many students the last two years of high school are wasted on repetitious and overly constrained work. Many young students, she thought, are ready to pursue college-level academic work before the usual system asks it of them. When envisioning the college in the early 1960s, Elizabeth Blodgett Hall deliberately named it simply "Simon's Rock", as even she did not know if it would be a high school, a college, or something else.

From 1964 to 1970, the buildings of the campus were on Great Pine Farm, a farm owned by Hall's family. These buildings were the college center, the library, the classroom buildings, three dormitories (now dormitories primarily for first-year students: Crosby, Dolliver, and Kendrick) and the dining hall. Some of the farm's buildings, such as Hall's own home, were incorporated into the college campus as well. Hall was the president of the college at its founding.

In 1966, the first class, all women, were admitted to Simon's Rock. These women, along with some of the other early classes, went through a four-year program that resulted in the associate's degree, at which point students desiring a further degree would have to transfer to another school. This differs from the current system, in which students receive an associate degree typically after two years, and then can earn a bachelor's degree after two additional years of study at Bard College.

The year 1970 saw both the first commencement ceremonies at Simon's Rock as well as the first coeducational entering class.

Hall retired as Simon's Rock's president in 1972 after students organized a vote of no confidence, handing the post off to Baird W. Whitlock, whose presidency ended in 1977. Though only serving for five years, Whitlock was very influential to Simon's Rock's development. He oversaw a complete change in the associate's program, which was condensed into two years, eliminating the high school components. He also oversaw the beginning of the bachelor's degree program, which awarded its first BA degrees in 1976.

==== Acquisition by Bard College ====
Also in 1979, Bard College, based about 50 miles away in New York, took over Simon's Rock, which was having difficulty expanding enrollment due to what the school perceived as a failure to grow acceptance of its experimental model and the prospect of funding drying up from the Blodgett family's foundation. Leon Botstein, the president of Bard, oversaw the acquisition and became president of both institutions, a position he held until his retirement in May 2026.

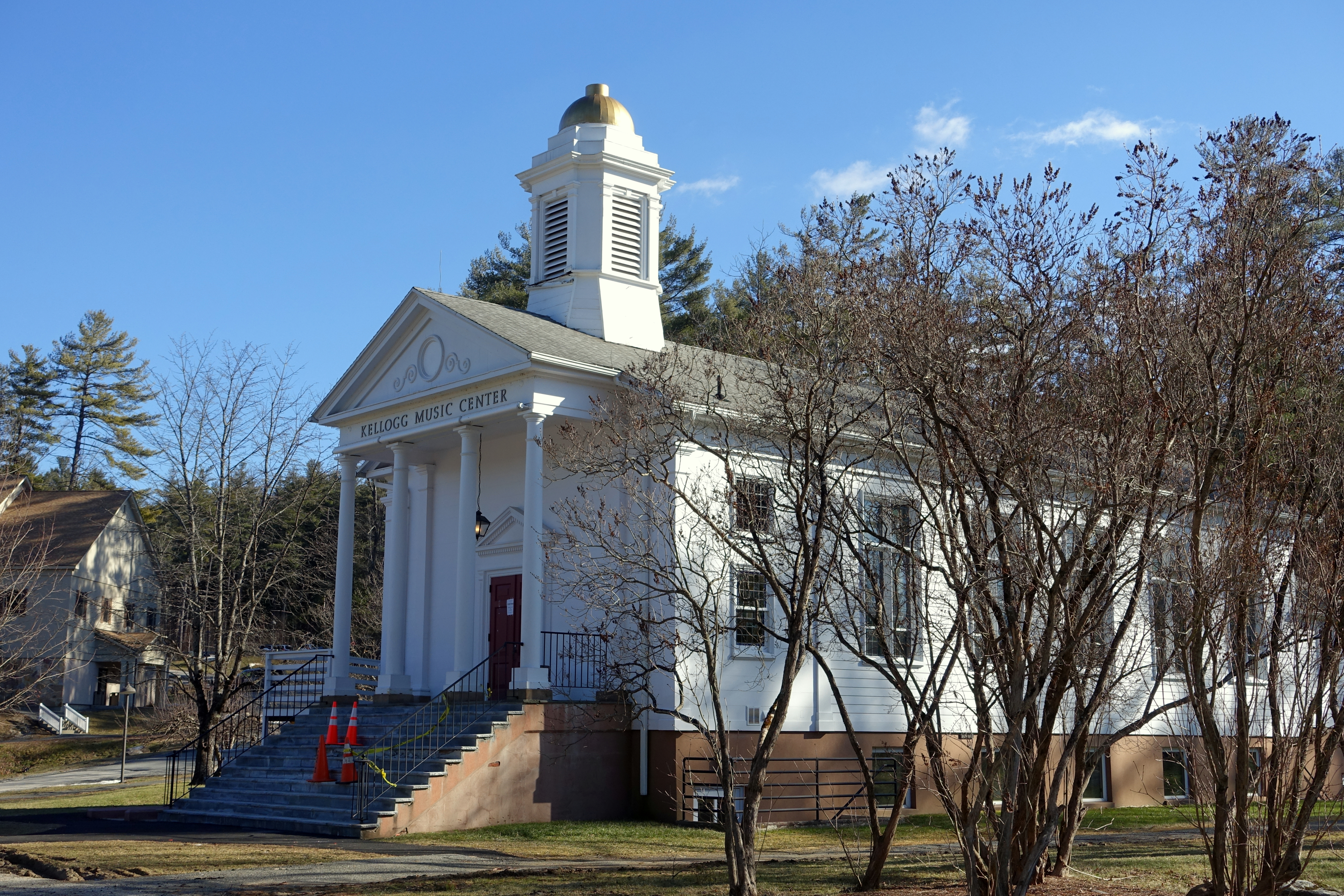
Kellogg Music Center at the former campus in Massachusetts

In 1981, with the help of various donors, Simon's Rock purchased the 75-acre (300,000 m^{2}) Upper Campus, a former seminary three-quarters of a mile uphill from the original Simon's Rock campus. This added a gymnasium, chapel and various forms of housing to Simon's Rock's assets.

In 1989, an arts and humanities building was built directly across Alford Road, near the college's other arts buildings. In the same year, the student union was established in the lower level of the dining hall.

On December 14, 1992, a mass shooting occurred at Simon's Rock College. At around 10:30 pm, Wayne Lo, a student at the school, shot and killed one student and one professor, and wounded three students and a security guard. His SKS rifle soon jammed and Lo later surrendered to authorities without further incident. The people killed in the shooting were 18-year-old Galen Gibson and 37-year-old Ñacuñán Saez.

In 1993, the then-unused chapel from upper campus was relocated to the main part of campus and renovated, becoming the college's music building. That same year, a number of the campus's arts and dormitory buildings were also renovated.

Since then, many buildings have been built or renovated. These include the Fisher Science and Academic Center (completed 1998), the Kilpatrick Athletic Center (completed 1999), the Daniel Arts Center (completed 2005), an apartment-like dormitory for upperclassmen (Pibly House, completed 2000), the Livingston Hall Student Union (completed 2006), and others.

In 2000, Simon's Rock became the first college in the United States to officially recognize International Workers' Day.

In 2001, Simon's Rock was instrumental in the founding of Bard High School Early College (BHSEC) in Manhattan. There are now seven Bard Early College programs located in New York, Newark, Cleveland, Baltimore, and New Orleans.

On April 11, 2006, part of Carriage House, a residence in upper campus, burned in an electrical fire in the early morning. No one was hurt in the incident, but some student possessions were partially or entirely destroyed. The remnants of the building were burnt down by the Great Barrington Fire Department in a January 2009 in a training exercise.

In 2015, Simon's Rock founded Bard Academy at Simon's Rock, a two-year high school program leading into the Lower College program.

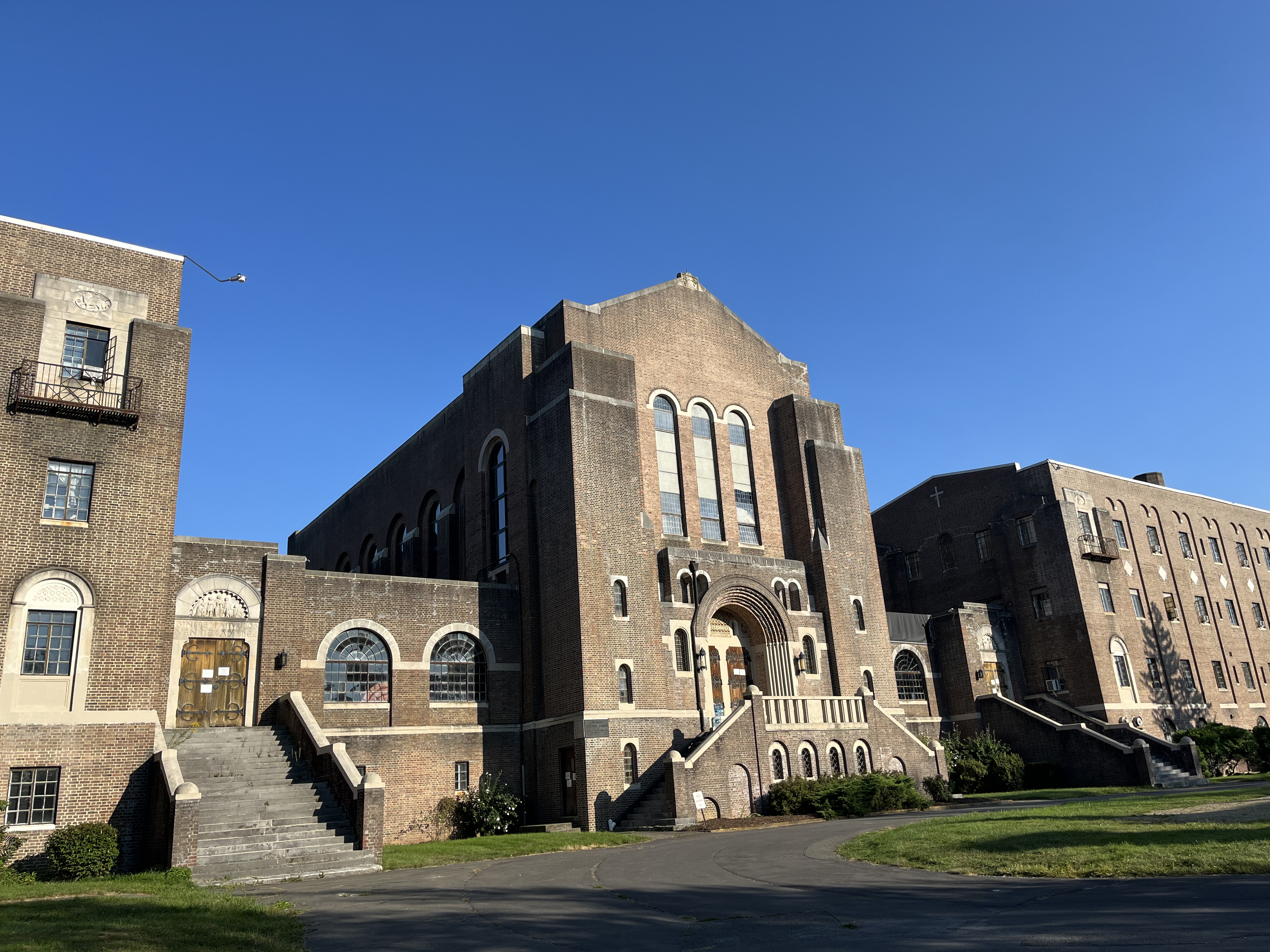
Since August 2025, this is the new home for Simon's Rock at Bard College.

On November 19, 2024, Provost John B. Weinstein announced that Simon's Rock would be relocated to Bard's newly purchased Massena Campus in Barrytown, New York at the site of the former site of the Unification Theological Seminary beginning in Fall 2025. In an announcement on the website of Simon's Rock, Weinstein cited declining enrollment revenue and a "competitive market" of early-college offerings as reasoning for the relocation.

The final commencement at the Massachusetts campus was held on May 17, 2025.

=== New York (2025–present) ===
Since summer 2025, the campus of Simon's Rock is the former site of the Unification Theological Seminary in Barrytown, dubbed the Massena Campus.

== Academics ==
Faculty at Simon's Rock at Bard College are primarily appointed to one of the following four academic divisions: the Division of the Arts, the Division of Languages and Literature, the Division of Science, Mathematics and Computing, and the Division of Social Studies. Students may also hold one of several concentrations available under Interdivisional Studies.

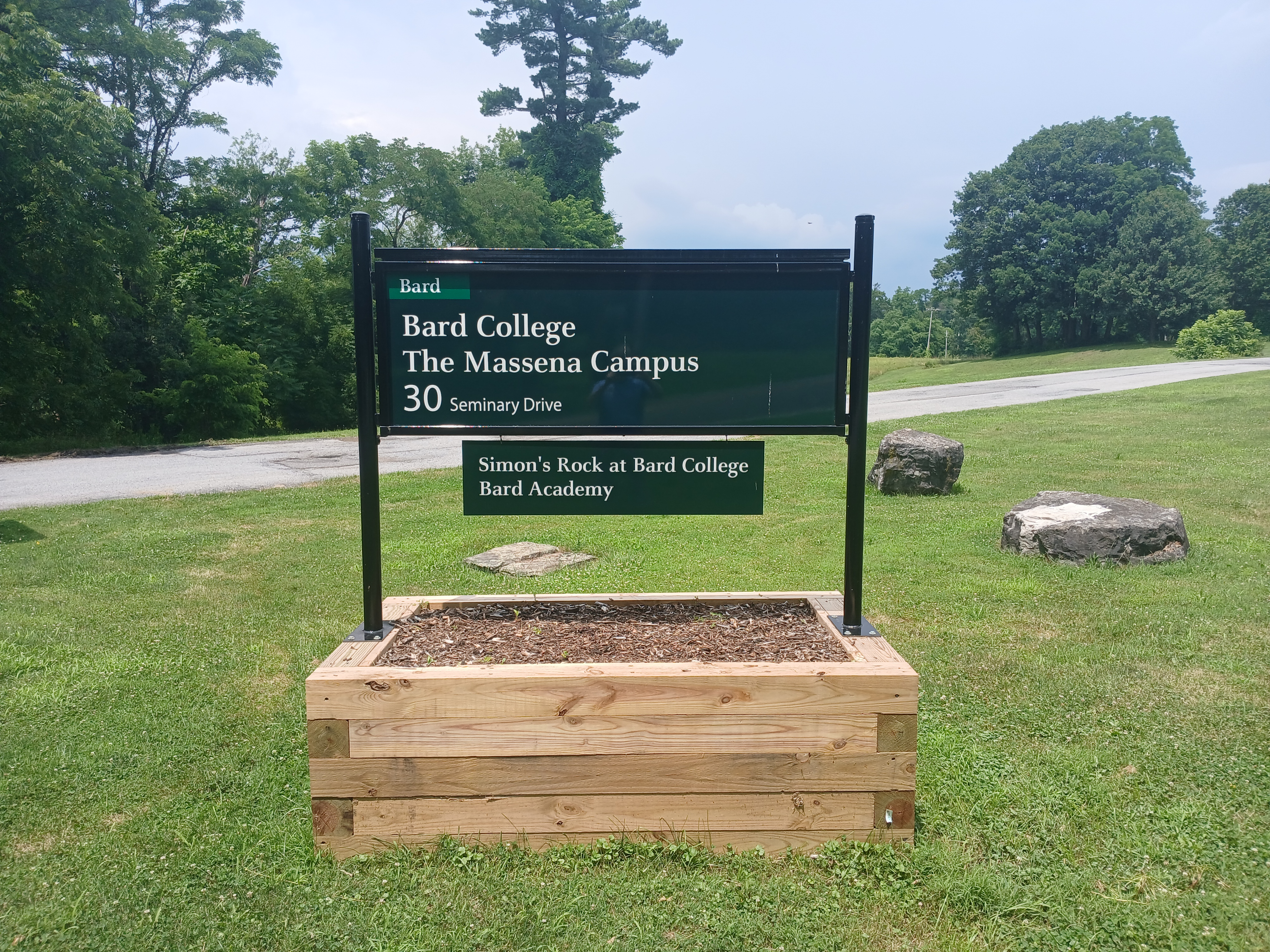
Simon's Rock at Bard College sign in Barrytown, New York in summer 2025.

Over 40 concentrations are available, including art history, Asian studies, chemistry, mathematics, physics, and theater. The school offers study abroad and independent study opportunities, as well as a 3/2 dual-degree program with Columbia University and Dartmouth College for those who wish to pursue engineering.

While many students receive associate degrees after two years and transfer to other institutions, many students continue on to Bard College's BA program. Those who wish to remain eligible for a bachelor's degree must complete senior theses, which become professionally printed, archived, and remain available to the public in the Alumni Library.

Classes are discussion-oriented, with lecture based offerings. The system is predicated on the idea that the students bring as much value to the class as the professors. In fact, orientation for incoming students is a mandatory week-long writing and thinking workshop, designed to readjust students to pedagogical, cooperative bidirectional learning.

It is a school policy that teachers and administrators are referred to on a first-name basis. Professors never receive tenure as a matter of policy.

There are only about 400 students (though due to its small size, large fluctuations in class enrollment and admissions are common), resulting in a very low student-to-faculty ratio, around 8:1. Few classes have more than 15 students; none have more than 30. Some classes have as few as three students, and independent study or tutorial courses in which one student works closely with a professor are common.

=== Accreditation ===
Simon's Rock was independently accredited from 1973 to 2021 by the New England Association of Schools and Colleges. Since 2021, it has operated as a branch location of Bard College under its accreditation by the Middle States Commission on Higher Education (2021–2026) and by the New England Association of Schools and Colleges (2026–present).

== Leadership ==
=== Presidents ===
1. Elizabeth Blodgett Hall (1966–1972)
2. Baird W. Whitlock (1972–1977)
3. Samuel McGill (1977–1979)
4. Leon Botstein (1979–2026)
5. Jonathan Becker (2026, acting)

=== Provost (or Dean) and Vice President ===
1. U Ba Win (1979–1987)
2. Bernard F. Rodgers, Jr. (1987–2004)
3. Mary Marcy (2004–2011)
4. Peter Laipson (2011–2015)
5. Ian Bickford (2016–2020)
6. Dimitri Papadimitriou (2019, acting)
7. John Weinstein (2020–present)

== Student life ==
=== Athletics ===
The llama is the mascot of Bard College at Simon's Rock, due to the proximity of the college soccer fields to Seekonk Veterinary Hospital, a veterinary clinic that, at one time, had a llama pasture. Interscholastic sports offered at the school include soccer, basketball, and swimming.

All students at Simon's Rock are required to fulfill athletic requirements through the Active Community Engagement (ACE) Program. ACE courses include traditional gym classes, such as martial arts, swimming lessons, weight training, and so on, but extend to things like bowling, dodgeball, hackeysack, gardening, and scuba diving.

=== Extracurriculars ===
Simon Rock's student newspaper, the Llama Ledge, moved to an online format in 2001, and continued publishing until at least 2014. The current student newspaper, Simon's Spectator, was founded in 2025 and currently publishes in an online format.

=== Housing ===
The vast majority of students at Simon's Rock live on-campus, and all students (except those with local families) are required to live on-campus during their first two years, with some exceptions.

==== Former housing in Massachusetts ====
In its former campus in Massachsetts, there were nine dormitories. Crosby House was a women's dormitory. Dolliver House was a men's dormitory. Kendrick House was a coeducational dormitory. Together Crosby, Dolliver and Kendrick were known as the "Tri- Dorms." They were predominantly for first-year students.

Hill House was a coeducational dormitory for sophomores, juniors, and seniors. A portion of Hill House was used to home the students of Bard Academy. Pibly House, Carriage House, and The Cottage were located on Upper Campus, a portion of the campus that is about 3/4 mile (1.2 km) uphill from the main section of the campus. Before 2007, it was mainly used for staff members. Other buildings on Upper Campus include the provost's house and the Annex (a small building that houses staff).

Carriage House was a relatively new dormitory, built in 2009 on the site where the former Carriage House stood. The majority of Carriage House was destroyed in a fire in 2005, and the remains stood until 2009. The remnants of the building were burnt down by the Great Barrington Fire Department as a training exercise. The replacement dormitory was primarily used for sophomores and some upperclassmen.

Pibly House was a coeducational dormitory, consisting of eight two- or three-bedroom apartments for juniors and seniors. The Annex had a single coeducational four-bedroom apartment for juniors and seniors. It was used as student housing in 2008-2009 and opened to students again starting in 2015 until the move to New York. The Owl's Nest, formerly a gathering space for students belonging to minority identity groups or organizations, came into use to house students in the Fall 2016 semester due to high housing demand.

The Foster Houses (colloquially known as "The Mods") were a set of 12 townhouses, each built to house four non-first-year students. After the 2010–2011 academic year the Foster Houses were closed for long-term renovation, The Mods reopened for students housing in the fall of 2017. The Orchard Houses housede five to seven non-first-years. Two were used to house staff members and their families at the time of the move to New York, with Orchard 3 used to house upperclassmen students. Red Brick House and Checker Chance were two dorms that housed small numbers of non-first year students in house style during 2008–2009. They were located across the street from the main section of campus, on Hurlburt road. Use of these houses was discontinued during the 2009–2010 school year. During the Fall 2008 semester the College also provided overflow student housing at the nearby Days Inn hotel.

== Notable alumni and faculty ==
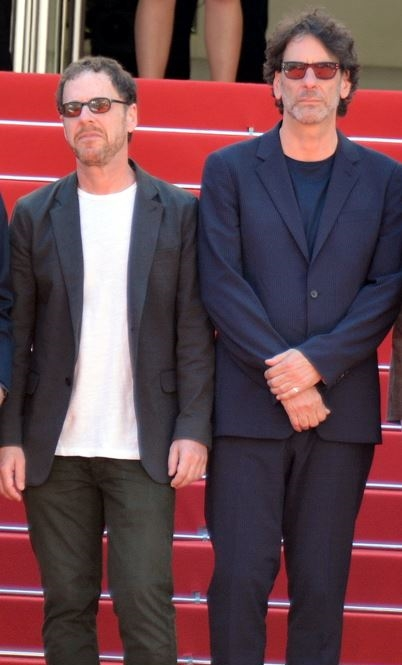
Coen brothers, filmmakers

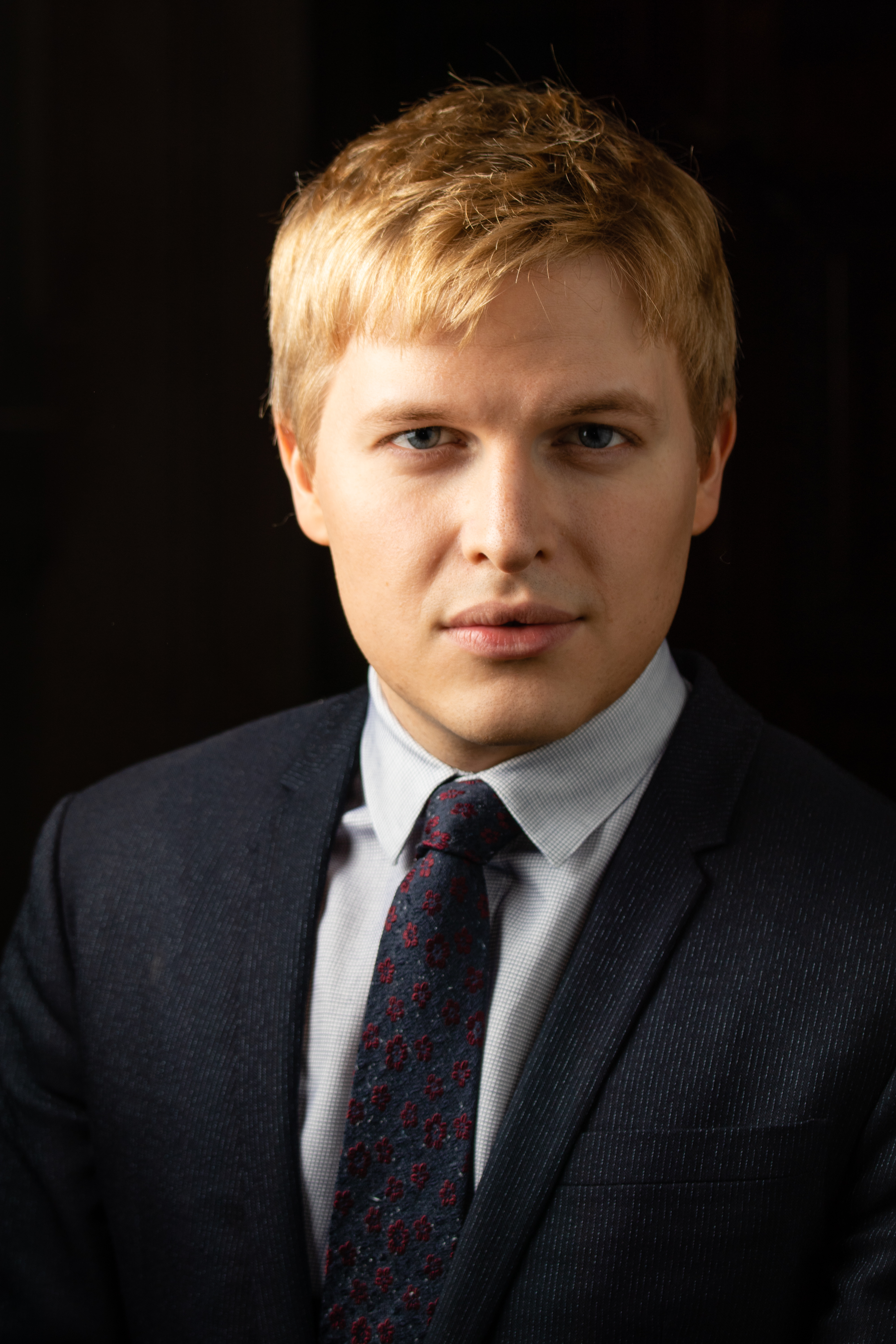
Ronan Farrow, journalist

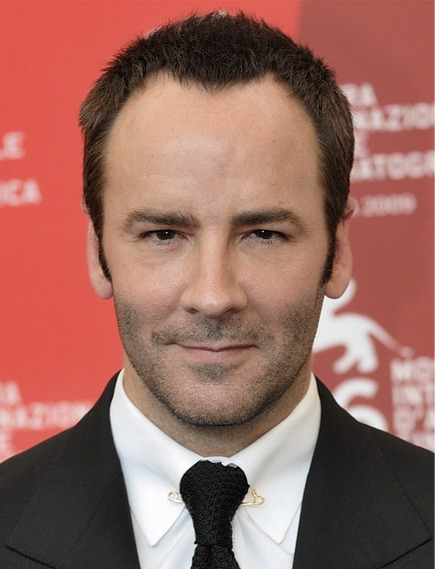
Tom Ford, fashion designer

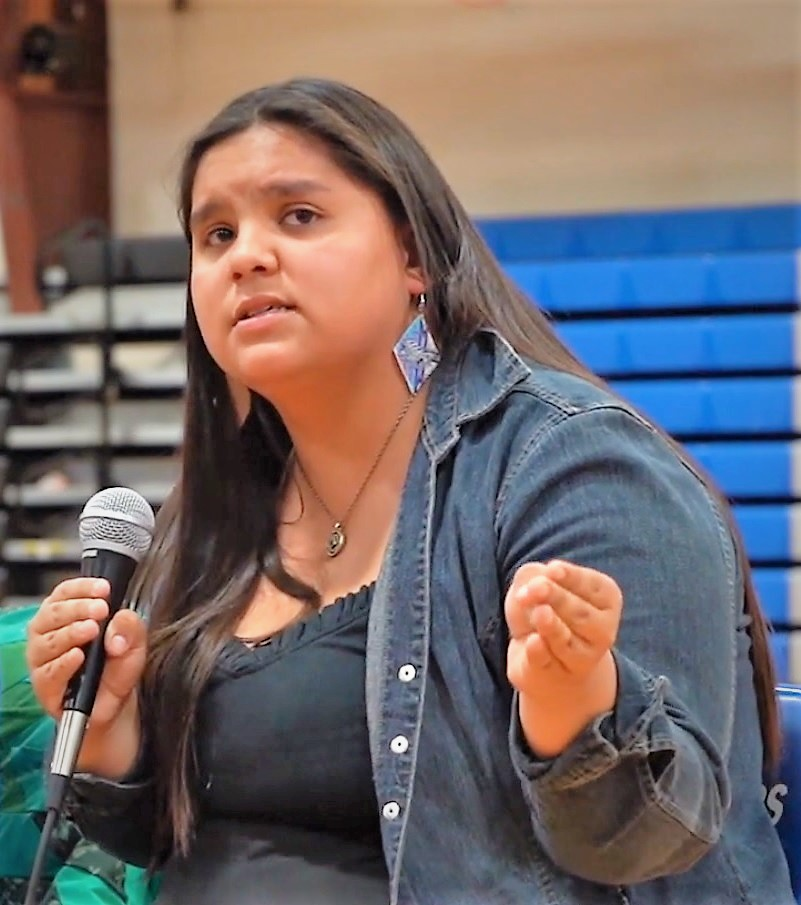
Tokata Iron Eyes, activist

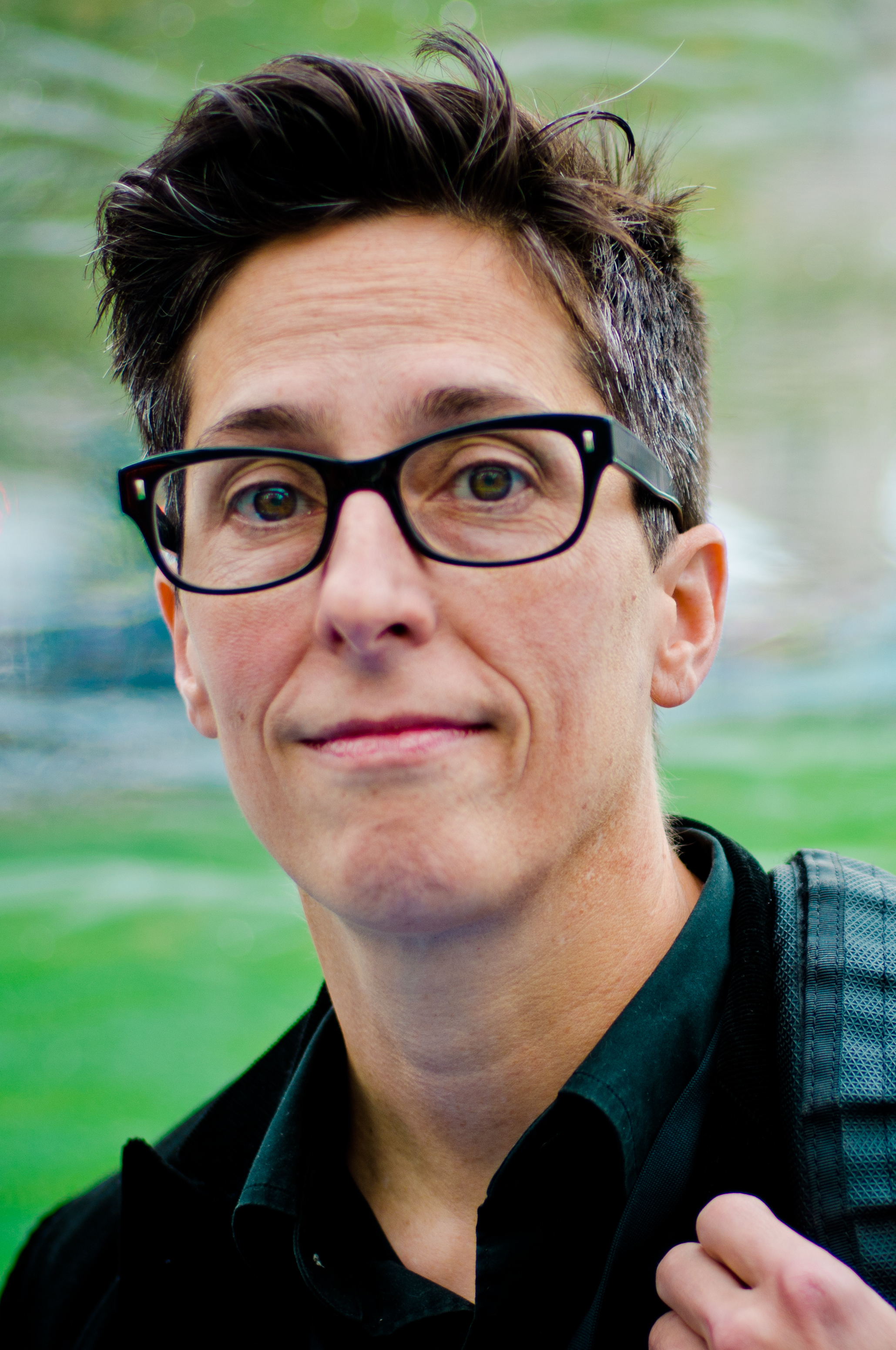
Alison Bechdel, cartoonist

=== Alumni ===
- Henry Alford, writer
- Loren AliKhan, attorney, judge on the District Court for the District of Columbia
- Solange Ashby, Egyptologist
- Amanda Baggs, activist
- Alison Bechdel, creator of the comic Dykes To Watch Out For and graphic novel Fun Home
- Veronica Chambers, writer
- Joel and Ethan Coen, Academy Award-winning filmmakers
- Brenda Cullerton, writer
- Martin Dosh, musician
- Mike Doughty, singer/songwriter, founder of the band Soul Coughing
- Daisy Eagan, actress
- Ronan Farrow, journalist (son of Mia Farrow and Woody Allen)
- Henry Ferrini, documentary filmmaker
- Annie Finch, poet
- Tom Ford, fashion designer, filmmaker
- Abby Franquemont, writer, revivalist of the art of hand spinning with the spindle
- Nat Gertler, writer
- Maria Giese, film director and screenwriter
- Ben Goertzel, artificial intelligence researcher
- Meg Hutchinson, singer-songwriter
- Julie Introcaso née Johnson, NH Circuit Court Judge
- Tokata Iron Eyes, Native American activist
- Jasmine Krotkov, retired postal worker and member of the Montana House of Representatives
- Michael S. Kurth, better known as Curse
- Mark Leiter, Chief Strategy Officer at Nielsen
- Jah Levi, musician
- Roman Mars, radio producer of the podcast 99% Invisible
- Zachary Mason, writer, known for his debut work The Lost Books of the Odyssey.
- John McWhorter, linguist and social commentator
- Raj Mukherji, NJ state legislator and technology entrepreneur
- Ada Palmer, novelist, historian and University of Chicago professor
- Eli Pariser, executive director, MoveOn.org Political Action
- Susan May Pratt, actress
- Matthew J. DeGennaro, scientist
- Ann Reid, scientist and science education advocate.
- Claire Rosen, artist
- Jan Staller, photographer
- Lee Stranahan, writer for Russian state media
- Kazys Varnelis, historian of architecture

=== Faculty ===
- Karen Allen, adjunct faculty in the arts, actress
- Nancy Bonvillain, professor of anthropology and linguistics, specializes in Native American cultures and languages
- Edgar Chamorro, former professor of Spanish and Latin, former leader of the Nicaraguan Contras
- Emmanuel Dongala, professor of chemistry and Richard B. Fisher Chair in Natural Sciences, novelist
- Peter Filkins, literary translator and poet
- David LaBerge, former adjunct faculty in psychology and biology
- Okey Ndibe, novelist
- David Spadafora, former professor of history
