= Brenda Cullerton =

American author, fashion writer and creative consultant

Brenda Cullerton (born April 11, 1952) is an American author, fashion writer and creative consultant. Her first novel, The Craigslist Murders, was published by Melville International Crime in 2011. Inspired by her experience furnishing an entire house from finds on the List, the book is currently held in more than 240 libraries.

== Early life and education ==
Cullerton was born in Norwalk, Connecticut. She received an Associate degree from Bard College at Simon's Rock, and finished her BA degree in English literature at New York University.

== Career ==
Cullerton began her career as a copywriter at Grey Advertising and continued to work as a freelance concept and content strategist for brands including Vogue, Donna Karan, Eileen Fisher, Aveda, Bergdorf Goodman, and others.

Cullerton has written editorials, mostly in the area of fashion and design, and is the author of six books. Her memoir, The Nearly Departed or My Family & Other Foreigners, was published by Little Brown in 2003. She wrote a biography of American fashion designer, Geoffrey Beene, and this was followed by several books on interiors and the home, all published by Harry Abrams.

Cullerton's one-woman-show, Jay Z and Me: A fast talking memoir, debuted at the Solo Voce Estrogenious festival in New York City on October 13, 2013. It was later performed at The Edinburgh Fringe Festival, The Merchant House in Amsterdam and various other New York venues.

== Personal life ==
Brenda Cullerton lives and works in New York City with her husband, Richard DeLigter, a television director and the founder of Real Productions, Inc. She has two children.

== Works ==
=== Nonfiction ===
- My Family & Other Foreigners (2003)
- Geoffrey Beene: The Anatomy of his Work] (1995)
- Time at Home (2001)
- Color at Home (2008)
- The Nearly Departed: Or, My Family and Other Foreigners (2003)

=== Fiction ===
- The Craigslist Murders (2011)
