= Early college high school =

Degree/certificate initiative at high schools in the United States

Early college high schools in the United States allow students to receive a high school diploma and an associate degree, or up to two years of college credit, by taking a mixture of high school and college classes. The programs differ from dual enrollment, by the intentional supports provided to students. These supports help students to prepare to take dual credit classes while in high school and be ready for the rigorous college work after they graduate from high school. Different from dual enrollment, early colleges also provide pathways leading to some post-secondary credential (such as an associate degree or technical certificate) or transferable college credit. There are different models of early college programs. Some early colleges are stand-alone small schools (whole school model), often located on a college campus, where all students are expected to participate in the program. Other early colleges are programs within comprehensive schools that enroll interested students.

== History ==
The first early college in the United States, Bard College at Simon's Rock, was founded in 1966. In 1974, Middle College High School at LaGuardia Community College opened, serving high school students who were below grade level in reading or math. Over 25 middle colleges were established in the next two decades.

The Early College High School Initiative was established in 2002 by the Bill & Melinda Gates Foundation, along with the Carnegie Corporation of New York, the Ford Foundation, and the W.K. Kellogg Foundation. Over the past two decades, Early Colleges have expanded rapidly nationwide. The initiative originally funded eight intermediary partners to establish and support early college schools and help establish partnerships between school districts and postsecondary institutions. Currently, a number of the intermediary organizations keep providing start-up and ongoing technical support, guidance, and professional development for their networks of schools. Among them are:

- Middle College National Consortium
- Center of Excellence for Leadership of Learning (CELL) at University of Indianapolis
- Michigan Early Middle College Association (MEMCA)
- Gateway to College National Network
- Educate Texas
- RTI International

In 2024, there were more than 1,200 early college programs in the United States.

== Research ==
Two Randomized Control Trials of the Early College High Schools were conducted by the teams at the Early College Research Center at the University of North Carolina at Greensboro (2006 - ongoing) and the American Institutes for Research (2010-2013 and 2021- 2024). These studies found multiple positive impacts of early colleges on their students, which included:

- Early college students were more likely to successfully complete a college preparatory course of study than students in the control group
- Early college students had higher attendance, fewer suspensions, and were more likely to graduate from high school
- Early college students enrolled in postsecondary education at higher rates
- Early college students received postsecondary credentials at a higher rate than control students.

== See also ==
- Dual enrollment
- Early entrance to college
