= Nancy Bonvillain =

American academic

Nancy Bonvillain is a former professor of anthropology and linguistics at Bard College at Simon's Rock. She is author of over twenty books on language, culture, and gender, including a series on Native American peoples. In her field work she worked with the Kanienʼkehá꞉ka (Mohawk) and Diné (Navajo) peoples, and she has published a grammar and dictionary of the Akwesasne dialect of Kanyenʼkéha (Mohawk). She received her PhD from Columbia University in 1972 and has taught at Columbia University, The New School, SUNY Purchase, Stony Brook University, and Sarah Lawrence College. Most recently she taught at Bard College at Simon's Rock.

== Career and Research ==
Bonvillain conducted research on Kanyenʼkéha in the 1960s and 70s, which culminated in several reports and publications. During fieldwork carried out at the St. Regis Mohawk Indian Reserve and Hogansburg, New York, Bonvillian submitted a report the summer of 1969. The report details factors in Mohawk, English and French language use, and synchronic linguistic fieldwork. She later published a presentation given at the 1972 Conference on Iroquois Research.

== Selected publications ==
- Bonvillain, Nancy; Beatrice Francis (1971). Mohawk-English Dictionary. Albany: University of the State of New York.
- Bonvillain, Nancy (1973). A Grammar of Akwesasne Mohawk. Mercury Series Paper, no. 8. Ottawa: National Museum of Man, National Museums of Canada.
- Nancy Bonvillain, ed. (1980). Studies on Iroquoian Culture. Occasional Publications in Northeastern Anthropology, no. 6. Rindge, N.H.: Dept. of Anthropology, Franklin Pierce College.
- Bonvillain, Nancy (1989). The Huron. New York: Chelsea House. ISBN 0-7910-0382-5.
- Bonvillain, Nancy (2001). Native Nations: Cultures and Histories of Native North America. Upper Saddle River N.J.: Prentice Hall. ISBN 978-0-13-863242-7.
- Bonvillain, Nancy (2001). Women and Men: Cultural Constructs of Gender (3rd ed.). Upper Saddle River, N.J.: Prentice Hall. ISBN 0-13-025973-X.
- Bonvillain, Nancy (2003). Language, Culture, and Communication: The Meaning of Messages (4th ed.). Upper Saddle River, N.J.: Prentice Hall. ISBN 0-13-097953-8.
- Bonvillain, Nancy (2003). Native American Religions. Native America, no. 3. München: Lincom Europa. ISBN 3-89586-343-2.
