= Zachary Mason =

American novelist

- Born: 1974 (age 51–52); United States
- Writing career
- Language: English
- Genre: Fiction

Zachary Mason (born 1974) is an American computer scientist and novelist. He wrote the New York Times bestselling The Lost Books of the Odyssey (2007; revised edition 2010), a variation on Homer, and Void Star (2017), a science fiction novel about artificial intelligence. In 2018, he published Metamorphica, based on Ovid's Metamorphoses.

Mason grew up in Silicon Valley, attended Bard College at Simon's Rock, and received a doctorate from Brandeis University, publishing his thesis A computational, corpus-based metaphor extraction system in 2002. He works for a Silicon Valley startup.
