= Usercentrics =

German privacy and consent management company

- Type: Private
- Industry: Data privacy technology, software
- Founded: 2018
- Founder: Mischa Rürup, Vinzent Ellissen, Lisa Gradow
- Headquarters: Munich, Germany
- Number of locations: 7
- Area served: Worldwide
- Key people: Donna Dror (CEO)
- Products: Data privacy and consent management software
- Website: usercentrics.com

Usercentrics is a data privacy technology company that develops software for consent management, preference management, and AI connectivity and access governance.

== History ==
Usercentrics was founded in 2018 in Munich, Germany, by Mischa Rürup, Vinzent Ellissen, and Lisa Gradow. Separately, Daniel Johannsen founded Cybot in Denmark in 2012 to operate the Cookiebot consent management platform. The two companies announced their merger under the Usercentrics name in September 2021.

In July 2019, Usercentrics announced a €4 million Series A led by Alstin Capital, with participation from existing investors Cavalry Ventures and Reimann Investors, and a €17 million Series B led by Full In Partners in December 2020.

In 2024, Google acquired a minority stake in Usercentrics.

In October 2025, Usercentrics reported that it had surpassed €100 million in annual recurring revenue, approximately $117 million, citing 45% year-over-year growth and profitability.

In January 2026, the company acquired New York City–based MCP Manager, a Model Context Protocol (MCP) gateway that gives enterprises visibility and access control over the AI tools and data connections their teams use.

== Technology and products ==
Usercentrics develops privacy infrastructure to collect user consent and preferences for the tags and technologies implemented across a website or app, transmit these signals to advertising platforms such as Google, Microsoft, and Amazon through their respective consent mode integrations, manage how data is distributed across marketing and analytics systems, and measure performance based on consented data.

Its product portfolio includes Usercentrics Web CMP, Cookiebot CMP, Usercentrics App CMP, Usercentrics CTV CMP, a Consent Management API, Preference Manager, Privacy Policy Generator and Server-Side Tracking technologies. Following the 2026 acquisition of MCP Manager, Usercentrics extended its platform to include MCP gateway capabilities, providing access controls, audit logs, and security policies for AI tool connections.

Usercentrics Web CMP and Cookiebot CMP both hold Gold Tier certification in Google’s CMP Partner Program. Both platforms are registered with IAB Europe under the Transparency and Consent Framework (TCF) and are listed on its CMP List.

Usercentrics's products are used to manage consent requirements under data protection regulations including the GDPR, CCPA, LGPD, and POPIA.
