= Early college programs =

Early college programs aim to close the academic gap between high school and college education, especially for first-generation and low-income students. Through these programs, high school students can enroll in college level classes, usually on campus, and earn credits that apply to their college degree and high school diploma. The main goal is to increase college accessibility and accessibility for individuals who might otherwise encounter substantial challenges.

Early college models, according to Ndiaye and Wolfe, "are designed to encourage and assist traditionally underrepresented groups of students—low income, Latino, and African-American—to persist in and graduate from high school while earning college credit." This method helps students build the confidence and abilities necessary to thrive in higher education by exposing them to the college setting while also improving their academic performance.

== Examples ==
Bard Early College

1. Bard High School Early College (Manhattan, New York; Queens, New York; Bronx, New York; Newark, New Jersey; New Orleans, Louisiana; Cleveland, Ohio; Baltimore, Maryland; and Washington, DC)
  - Students can earn both a high school diploma and an Associate in Arts degree from Bard College.
2. Simon's Rock at Bard College (Barrytown, NY)
  - Part of Bard College is a residential early college program that allows students to start college after the 10th or 11th grade and earn an Associate of Arts degree.
3. Early College High School (Costa Mesa, CA)
  - A collaboration between the Newport-Mesa Unified School District and Coastline Community College, allowing students to earn up to two years of college credit while completing high school.
4. North Carolina School of Science and Mathematics (NCSSM) (Durham, NC)
  - Offers a residential program for high-achieving high school students to take college-level courses, many of which are eligible for college credit.
5. University of Texas at Austin High School (UTHS) (Austin, TX)
  - Provides an online high school program with the option for students to take college courses for credit through UT Austin’s extension programs.
6. The George Washington University Early College Program (Washington, DC)
  - Academically and socially mature sophomores at School Without Walls High School apply to The George Washington University Early College Program for the opportunity to take college courses alongside GW students and earn at least 60 college credits tuition-free from 11th to 12th grade. They earn an Associate of Arts degree from GW's Columbian College of Arts and Sciences alongside their Walls high school diploma. Admission is limited to a maximum of 15 students per year.
7. Community College System of New Hampshire's (CCSNH) Early College Program (Concord, NH)
  - High school students join NH's dual enrollment program for the opportunity to earn free college credits and take advantage of discounted tuition from 10th to 12th grade.
  - https://www.earlycollege.ccsnh.edu

== Benefits ==
Students who enroll in early college benefit significantly in terms of academics for better college preparedness, and financial savings. Early College participants improve academically from their involvement. Students in these programs earn about sixty college credits while still in high school, allowing them to get a head start on their college education. This early exposure to college level coursework not only improves their academic performance but also builds their confidence in handling difficult coursework. As a result, early college students often transition easily to higher education, better prepared for the rigorous college academics. Students who attempt to maintain their college assignments during their high school years are better equipped to handle the rigorous coursework of college, which results in higher rates of commitment and completion. The purpose of this preparation is to ensure that students are adequately prepared for their future academic efforts by closing the gap between high school and college.

The opportunity for financial savings is one of the most irresistible advantages of attending college early. Early College offers major financial benefits to both students and their families. Early College students can earn significant financial savings by completing up to two years of college education for free. Students who obtain college credits while still in high school can lower the overall amount of credits they will have to pay for when they start college. According to a study by the American Institutes for Research, Early College High School participation significantly improves educational outcomes and can lead to long-term financial benefits, with students potentially saving an average of $33,000 on college tuition. Higher education may become more affordable and accessible for many families as a result of these programs.

== Curriculum and course offerings ==
Early college programs allow students to obtain college credits concurrently with high school credits by including college level courses into the high school curriculum.

Many schools offer advanced placement (AP) classes, and their completion leads to an exam on which students may be able to receive college credit. According to Klopfenstein and Thomas, "students who take AP courses are better prepared for the rigor of college coursework, as evidenced by higher first-year college GPAs compared to their peers who did not take AP courses." Early college courses, on the other hand, are usually taken at nearby colleges or through dual enrollment programs, giving students direct exposure to college level content and credits that are usually easily transferred.

== Impact on high school graduation rates ==
Studies show that early college initiatives greatly increase both college enrollment and high school graduation rates. According to a research conducted by the American Institutes for Research (AIR), students who attended Early College High Schools were significantly more likely than students enrolled in traditional high schools to graduate from high school and enroll in colleges or universities. In particular, the study revealed that 84% of Early College students, as compared to 77% of students in the control group, enrolled in higher education within six years of graduating from high school. Furthermore, Early College students had a higher chance of obtaining college degrees and college credits while still in high school, with almost 45% of them obtaining a degree within six years, compared to 34% of the control group.

Early college programs greatly improve long term educational and career outcomes, in addition to improving college enrollment and high school graduation rates. Compared to their peers who do not participate, students who take part in the early college program have a higher chance of continuing higher education, graduating college, and having a greater career opportunity. Early college students are more likely to enroll in college, earn a degree, and are more prepared for the workforce. They also have more successful financial and personal outcomes up to 14 years after high school graduation, according to research by the American Institutes for Research. Moreover, by assisting students in becoming used to college settings, these programs improve their preparedness for further education and provide them with transferable skills. All things considered, early college programs provide significant long-term advantages that go well beyond high school, setting students up for success in the classroom and in the workplace.

== Student experience ==
Early college program eligibility usually depends on a number of factors, such as academic standing, recommendations from teachers, and an academic record of higher education. To advance educational equity, these programs frequently give underrepresented and low-income pupils priority. Examples of requirements could be meeting a particular GPA, finishing a particular course of study, and demonstrating a strong desire to pursue further education. These processes of selection ensure skilled and driven students, especially those from underrepresented backgrounds, can take advantage of these possibilities.

For early college students, managing the responsibilities of both high school and college courses can be difficult. Early college programs offer significant support services like academic advising, tutoring, and flexible scheduling in order to solve these kinds of challenges. Programs are made to assist students in managing their responsibilities so they don't feel stressed. For instance, a lot of programs have committed staff members who can help with time management and ways to study. Some even offer mental health resources to enhance the wellbeing of their students.

Early college programs frequently result in students reporting life changing experiences. Many people get confidence, learn useful academic abilities, and value the shorter time and lower expense of a college degree. There are many student success stories describing how these programs have improved their professional and educational paths. Graduates, for example, often emphasize the benefit of having credits acquired prior to attending college and how equipped they feel for rigorous higher education. The high percentages of early college participants completing their degrees and enrolling in college testify to these beneficial effects.

Through early college programs, many students report having experiences that change their lives. For instance, Maria, a low-income first-generation college student, described how the program helped her obtain 30 college credits before high school graduation. "I never thought I could go to college because of the cost," stated Maria. "But with the early college program, I not only saved money but also gained confidence in my abilities to handle college-level work." A student from an underserved community who is African-American, James, also emphasized the assistance he got. He said, "Balancing high school and college was tough," he also added on, "But the tutoring services and flexible scheduling made it manageable. I felt more prepared and less anxious about the transition to a four-year university." These first-hand accounts highlight the significant impact that early college programs have on students' lives, offering advantages in terms of finances as well as academic readiness.

== Future trends and development ==
Expanding early college programs is becoming increasingly common as a way to reach more students, especially those from communities with limited resources. To accommodate a wider range of interests and career pathways, this growth includes developing new relationships between high schools and universities and expanding the diversity of course offerings.

In order to maximize the benefits of early college programs on student performance and equity in learning, policymakers are focusing more on funding and supporting these initiatives. This includes addressing issues like obtaining sufficient money, making sure that resources are distributed, and maintaining the level of quality and rigor of the courses that are provided. For these programs to succeed and grow sustainably, effective policy measures are essential.

To improve the effectiveness and accessibility of early college programs, innovations including flexible scheduling and online dual enrollment are being considered. These developments are intended to increase the accessibility of early college options for a larger group of students, including those who would not have been able to take advantage of them in the past because of scheduling or location issues. Early college programs can change to keep up with the changing requirements of students and the expectations of the educational environment through the implementation of technology and flexible learning models.

== Conclusion ==
Early college programs play an important part in helping students transition from high school to a college education, especially those who are first generation and low income. According to a report by the American Institutes for Research, 86% of early college students who identify as first-generation or low-income enroll in college immediately after high school, compared to the national average of 67% for these groups. Additionally, 74% of early college students earn a postsecondary degree within six years, a stark contrast to the 54% national average for their peers. These statistics highlight the significant impact of early college programs in improving college access and success rates for traditionally underserved students. These initiatives not only improve students' academic readiness but also result in significant cost reductions, opening up higher education to more people. Early college programs give students the resources they need to succeed academically and confidently manage the challenges of college coursework by offering a curriculum that smoothly integrates college level courses into high school academics.

Beyond just improving academic performance, early college programs have a significant beneficial effect on high school graduation rates and college enrollment. Students who take part in these programs have a higher chance of going to college, graduating, and succeeding in their careers. Furthermore, early college graduates' positive experiences emphasize how these programs had a tremendously beneficial impact on their academic and career pathways.

The expansion and development of early college programs have led to an increasing focus on equity, and policy support. A commitment to meeting the various requirements of students while improving educational outcomes can be observed in the efforts made to improve accessibility through flexible scheduling, online dual enrollment, and a variety of course offerings. Early college programs have the potential to have a long lasting effect on student achievement and educational equity because they embrace technological innovations and adjust to changing educational environments.
