= The Lost Books of the Odyssey =

2007 novel by Zachary Mason

- Dust jacket from the first revised edition
- Author: Zachary Mason
- Cover artist: Chin-Yee Lai
- Language: English
- Genre: Parallel novel
- Publisher: Farrar, Straus and Giroux
- Publication date: 2010 (1st revised edition)
- Publication place: United States
- Media type: Print (Hardbound)
- Pages: 228
- ISBN: 978-0-374-19215-0
- OCLC: 422758757

The Lost Books of the Odyssey is a 2007 novel by Zachary Mason, republished in 2010. It is a reimagination of Homer's Odyssey.

Mason, who wrote the book while working full-time, won first prize and initial publication in a 2007 competition sponsored by Starcherone Books, an independent publisher in Buffalo, New York. The Los Angeles Times reviewed the book, and it became a finalist in the New York Public Library's Young Lions Fiction competition in 2009. The book garnered additional positive reviews upon re-publication with Farrar, Straus, and Giroux.

Jonathan Galassi, president of Farrar, Straus and Giroux, noticed the book and worked with Mason to craft a second edition of the book, reducing its length and making other modifications to the content. The result was more widely reviewed to acclaim.

== Plot ==
A series of short stories following the general theme of Odysseus, discussing fragments from the Iliad and the Odyssey, changing narrator and subject on very regular occasion for a total of 44 fragments.
