= Sue Davies =

British gallery director (1933–2020)

Sue Davies OBE, HonFRPS
- Davies in 1971 at The Photographers Gallery
- Born: Susan Elizabeth Adey; April 14, 1933; Abadan, Iran
- Died: April 18, 2020 (aged 87); Hereford
- Occupation: Gallery Director
- Years active: 1966–1991
- Known for: Founding The Photographers' Gallery, London, Britain's first gallery devoted to photography

Susan Elizabeth Davies OBE HonFRPS (née Adey; 14 April 1933 – 18 April 2020) was the founder of The Photographers' Gallery in 1971, Britain's first independent gallery of photography, which she directed until 1991.

== Early life ==
Davies was born in Abadan, Iran, on 14 April 1933 where her father Stanworth Adey was working as an engineer at the Anglo-Iranian Oil Company, and the family later moved to New York. Her mother was Joan (née Charlesworth). They returned to the U.K. when she was 14 and she went to school in Kent and London before training as a secretary. In 1954, at the age of 21, she married jazz musician John R. T. Davies (1927–2004), also a sound restorer of early jazz recordings. The couple had three children, Joanna, Jessica and Stephanie. (Stephanie, the youngest, died from cancer in 1988.)

Davies worked on the Municipal Journal and then started a part-time job at the Artists Placement Group in London before taking a job at the Institute of Contemporary Art (ICA) in 1968 where she was exhibitions secretary to Roland Penrose, the ICA's co-founder. Her interest in photography was aroused by the presence there of Bill Jay who was using the venue for his Photo Study Centre seminars. At the suggestion of Julie Lawson, Penrose's personal assistant, Davis installed the ICA's Spectrum exhibition (3 April-11 May 1969) a large group exhibition from Stern magazine on the subject 'Woman'. A parallel show included British artists Dorothy Bohm, Tony Ray-Jones, Don McCullin, and Italian Enzo Ragazzini, and it was the British photographers who were among those to suggest Davies open a dedicated photography gallery.

== Founder, The Photographers' Gallery ==
One of five staff at the Institute of Contemporary Arts in Dover Street London, and one of 36 after it moved to The Mall, Davies experienced its period of anarchic management and overrun budget. She decided to rectify the lack of a permanent gallery space for photography as a serious art form, encouraged by the success of Bill Jay's "Do Not Bend Gallery", which he opened in 1970, though he did not show photography exclusively. On 14 January 1971, bankrolled by a second mortgage on her house, she launched such a gallery in a derelict J. Lyons tea room which she had been in the habit of visiting after jazz sessions. Deciding against the title "Photography Gallery", in a democratic spirit she named it The Photographers' Gallery. It was well positioned at 8 Great Newport Street, Covent Garden, next to the Arts Theatre and near Leicester Square, but was in a state of disrepair. Her application to the Arts Council for financial support drew the response “Well, why can't you finance the Gallery by selling prints?” It took the Arts Council two years to grant the Gallery any aid.

Davies registered the business as a charity and found patrons and supporters in Magnum agency photographers such as David Hurn, and newspaper publishers Tom Hopkinson and David Astor, who with Roy Strong (who in 1968 was encouraged by success in showing Cecil Beaton at the National Portrait Gallery) assisted her in managing the first year expenses of £12,000 paid from the entry fees of 20,000 visitors, and further funding from the Arts Council covering a deficit of around £7,000. That year, on November 7 an Observer newspaper report described her effort;

She has worked like a demon. She found the premises and put up the money, though she's not at all rich, and she persuaded distinguished men like Roy Strong from the National Portrait Gallery to sit on her board and got Tom Hopkinson, editor of the legendary Picture Post, as chairman. As a result it is now perfectly possible that she has founded, single-handed, what may become the photographic equivalent of the National Gallery. Photographs are already 'art' in America. Victorian classic photographs change hands in the salesroom. (There is to be a big sale of them at Sotheby's in December.)

Around The Photographers' Gallery Davies formed a photographic community in London rivalling that already established in New York. 3500sq.ft. of space accommodated exhibitions and room for the public to meet and to listen to speakers. International figures such as Arthur Tress and JH Lartigue, showed in the space, presented talks and workshops, and were offered accommodation in Davies' small flat at the top of 5 Great Newport Street as a way of encouraging their interaction with the Gallery patrons and attendance at parties that became legendary.

== Impact ==
Exhibitions were wide-ranging in subject matter; the first was The Concerned Photographer curated by Cornell Capa, and the second, a show of Andy Warhol's Polaroids, was followed by exhibitions with themes devoted to industry, fashion and landscape, and young photographers. Not all exhibitors met with approval of critics however, and in particular Davies' showings—three in as many years—of David Hamilton were condemned by Euan Duff for its "clichéd pictorial symbolism, exploiting soft focus, pastel colours, country landscapes and old houses, old fashioned clothes and even white doves to give a phoney impression of heaIth-food ad naturalness; they are a sort of wholemeal stoneground pornography," exhibited "because the gallery needs the money."

Support for British photography was empowered by the appointment of Barry Lane as the first photography officer of the Arts Council in 1973 who increased access to financial support for photographic initiatives, and The Photographers' Gallery was followed shortly afterwards by the creation in 1972 of Half Moon Gallery (later Camerawork,) in London, Impressions Gallery in York (also 1972) and the Ffotogallery in Cardiff in 1978, by which date The Photographers' Gallery was attracting 20,000 visitors a month and was staffed by six including Australian Graham Howe, with Dorothy Bohm an early supporter whose husband was a trustee. Curator India Dhargalkar started her career at the Photographers' Gallery, and Francis Hodgson, who went on in 1994 to run Zwemmer Fine Photographs, worked in the Gallery's Print Room when in 1980 the gallery expanded to occupy No. 5 Great Newport Street and the freehold was purchased, as did Zelda Cheatle, starting 1983, who in 1989 set up her eponymous commercial space. Other workers included; from 1975, Helena Srakocic-Kovac in the Print Room, who in 1980 co-owned Contrasts gallery, then with Dorothy Bohm co-founded Focus gallery (1998-2004); and over 1976–86, Claire de Rouen (c.1930-2012) who became founder and proprietor of the eponymous independent fashion and photography bookshop in Soho.

During Davies' period of tenure the Gallery held some 150 major exhibitions, as well as countless smaller shows. Photographs of Walker Evans, W. Eugene Smith, Florence Henri, William Klein, Imogen Cunningham, Helen Levitt, and hundreds more were among the offerings. Thematic exhibitions included Concerned Photographers 1 (1971), The Press Show (1973), European Colour (1978), and Modern British Photography (1981). The Gallery hosted the first British exhibitions by Irving Penn, J. H. Lartigue, André Kertesz, William Klein, Bert Hardy and George Rodger, and David Goldblatt's conscience-provoking images of apartheid in South Africa were presented by Davies in 1974, in his earliest solo show. Many of the exhibitions travelled throughout England under the auspices of the Arts Council of Great Britain. From 1981–1982 Professor Margaret Harker presented a lecture series at the Gallery on developments in photography in Britain.

Current director of The Photographers' Gallery, Brett Rogers, notes:

Sue’s vision for the Gallery was rooted in a spirit of collaboration. From the outset, she gathered a group of like-minded people to work with her to ensure that TPG was first and foremost a place for photographers to exhibit, share, meet and sell their work. Equally she wanted to offer an environment to inspire, educate and inform audiences about the pivotal - and unique - role photography plays in our lives and communities.

== Later career ==
In 1991, Davies stepped down from The Photographers' Gallery when she found her time usurped by fund-raising needed due to changes to London boroughs contributions. On her departure the Gallery occupied two venues, employed 23 staff, showed 21 exhibitions each year in three galleries, housed a profitable bookshop and sold works in from its Print Room stock. She was replaced by Sue Grayson Ford, previously Director of the Serpentine Gallery, and continued to be involved in photography as a visiting lecturer and curator as well as serving as Sculpture Coordinator for the 1984 Liverpool Garden Festival. She was founder Exhibitions Coordinator of Manchester Cornerhouse and Director of Wakefield Centenary Festival.

== Death ==
Davies died in Hereford, on 18 April 2020, four days after her 87th birthday, and in the year before the 50th anniversary of The Photographers' Gallery.

== Awards and recognition ==
- 1982 Royal Photographic Society Progress Medal and Honorary Fellowship
- 1988 Appointed Officer of the Order of the British Empire (OBE) in the 1988 Birthday Honours

== Publications ==
- Davies, Sue; Photographers' Gallery (London) (1978). European colour photography. London: Photographers' Gallery. OCLC 1313750301.
- Davies, Sue; Brandt, Bill; Photographers' Gallery (London) (1979). Brassaï: [exhibition of photographs. OCLC 501178564.
- Royal Anthropological Institute of Great Britain and Ireland; Davies, Sue (1980). Observers of man: photographs [from the collection of the Royal Anthropological Institute ...; exhibition organiser, R. Poignant; foreword by Sue Davies. London. OCLC 953897442.
- Davies, Sue; Rand, Michael; Photographers' Gallery (1983). British photography 1955-1965: the master craftsmen in print. London: Photographers' Gallery. OCLC 779032562.
- Davies, Sue, Collier, Caroline, Photographers' Gallery (1986). Industrial image: British industrial photography 1843 to 1986. London: Gallery. ISBN 978-0-907879-11-4. OCLC 470730831.
- Davies, Sue (May 1986). "Chris Killip". Camera International. 9 (Spring): 40–49.
