= Paul Joyce =

British photographer and filmmaker

Paul Joyce (born 1940, or 1941 or 1944) is a British photographer and filmmaker. His portraits of artists are held in the collection of the National Portrait Gallery, London and his Welsh landscape photographs are held in the collection of Amgueddfa Cymru – Museum Wales.

== Life and work ==
Joyce was born in Winchester, Hampshire.

Between 1976 and 1979 he visited Wales on several occasions, resulting in a touring exhibition and a catalogue. He is the author of two books based on conversations with David Hockney.

In 1977, Joyce directed a production of The Caretaker by Harold Pinter at Greenwich Theatre.

== Publications ==
=== Books by Joyce ===
- From Edge to Edge: Photographs of the Welsh Landscape. London: Lucida, 1983. ISBN 9780950884400. Exhibition catalogue.
- Hockney on Photography: Conversations with Paul Joyce. London: Cape/Random House, 1988. ISBN 978-0224024846.
- Hockney on Art: Conversations with Paul Joyce. New York; London: Little, Brown. 2000; ISBN 9780224024846 / 2008; ISBN 978-1408701577.

=== Books with contributions by Joyce ===
- About Seventy Photographs. Arts Council of Great Britain, 1980. ISBN 978-0728702097.
- Time Pieces: A Dublin Memoir. Dublin: Hachette, 2016. By John Banville, with photographs by Joyce. ISBN 978-1473619043.

== Film and television ==
- Warriors' Gate, Doctor Who (1981) – directed by Joyce

== Solo exhibitions ==
- Paul Joyce: Photographs of Elders, National Portrait Gallery, London, 1977/78
- Edge to Edge – Photographs of the Welsh Landscape. Toured by the Welsh Arts Council. Curated by Colin Ford.

== Collections ==
Joyce's work is held in the following permanent collections:

- Arts Council Collection, UK
- Government Art Collection, UK
- Amgueddfa Cymru – Museum Wales, Cardiff: 12 landscape prints (as of 12 September 2021)
- National Portrait Gallery, London: 51 prints of artists (as of 12 September 2021)
- Tate, London: 1 print (as of 12 September 2021)
