= SIFF Cinema Downtown =

Movie Theatre in Seattle, Washington

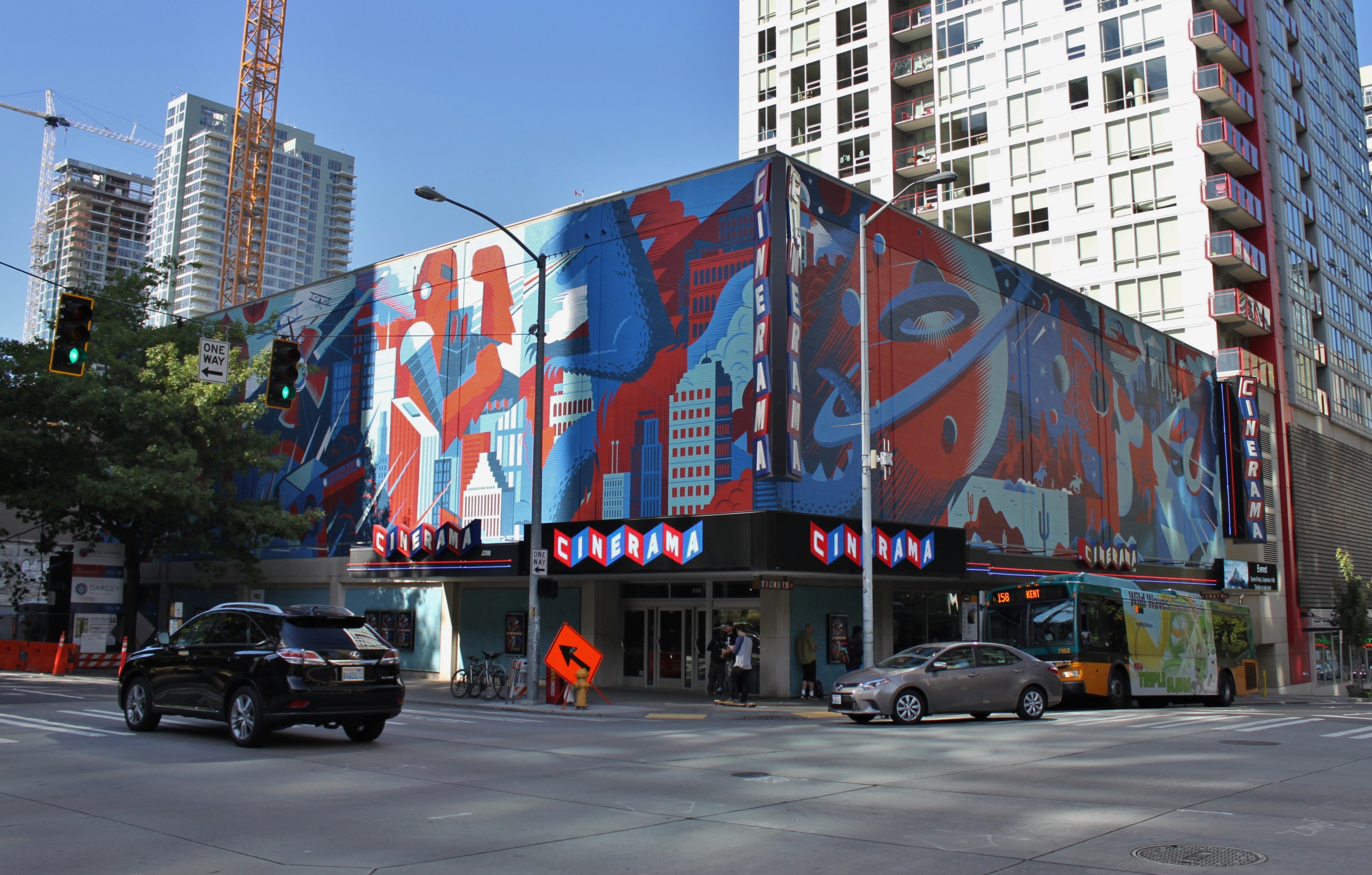
- Seattle Cinerama pictured after its 2014 renovation
- Interactive map of SIFF Cinema Downtown
- Former names: Seattle Cinerama; Seattle's Martin Cinerama
- Address: 2100 4th Avenue; Seattle, Washington, U.S.
- Coordinates: 47.61394°N 122.34133°W
- Owner: Seattle International Film Festival
- Capacity: 570

Construction
- Opened: 1963
- Renovated: 1999, 2010, 2014, 2020
- Closed: 2020–2023

Website
- SIFF.net

The SIFF Cinema Downtown, formerly the Seattle Cinerama, is a landmark movie theater in the Belltown neighborhood of Seattle, Washington, United States. The theater opened in 1963 and was renovated in the 1990s after its acquisition by Paul Allen. The Cinerama was closed in May 2020. At the time of its 2020 closure, it was one of only three movie theaters in the world capable of showing three-panel Cinerama films. In 2023, the theater was purchased by the Seattle International Film Festival (SIFF) and reopened on December 14, 2023 as SIFF Cinema Downtown due to trademark issues with the "Cinerama" name.

== History ==
The Seattle Cinerama opened in 1963 as Seattle's Martin Cinerama as a showcase for Cinerama. It was retrofitted a few months later to also show 70 mm films on its large curved screen. It soon became specialized in showing such spectaculars as The Wonderful World of the Brothers Grimm and It's a Mad, Mad, Mad, Mad World. Both formats shortly fell out of fashion, and Krakatoa, East of Java from 1969 was the last non-standard film to be shown at the Cinerama in the first era of its existence.

The following three decades were lean, as the proliferation of suburban multiplex theaters drew movie fans away from the Cinerama. Lackluster ticket sales quickly led to a general decline in the theater's upkeep, until it was relegated to playing second-run movies after being taken over by Cineplex Odeon on a reduced rent, month-to-month basis.

=== Major 1990s renovation ===
The turnaround began in 1997 when developers revealed plans to turn the Cinerama into a dinner theater or a rock-climbing club. This sparked a grassroots effort to save the historic venue, with local film buffs circulating petitions and issuing an urgent cry for help, which was answered by multi-billionaire Paul Allen, himself a movie fan and patron of the theater during its 1960s heyday.

Allen purchased the theater and initiated a comprehensive, multimillion-dollar restoration. The grand re-opening occurred in 1999. Since then, the theater has played both classic movies and select new productions.

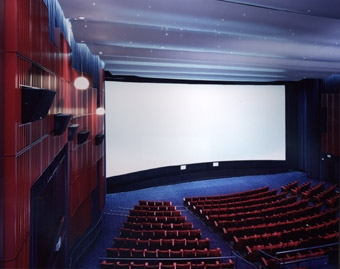
The interior

The renovation restored the look of a great mid-20th century movie house, and installed of state-of-the-art technology and accessibility features. The theater had 808 seats and two screens. The first was a deep curved 90-foot-long, 30-foot-high screen, constructed of 2,000 louvered strips. It is used for presenting rare three-strip films such as How the West Was Won and 70 mm classics like Stanley Kubrick's 2001: A Space Odyssey. The deep curved screen is stored in sections behind a smaller screen used for regular screenings of modern 70 mm/35 mm first-run movies. A professional crew is required to dismantle the smaller screen and assemble the larger one for Cinerama and special event presentations.

=== 2010 renovation ===
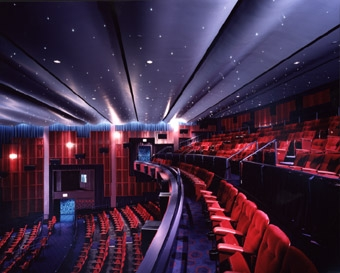
The balcony

The theater closed at the end of August 2010 for renovations. During the closure, a new digital projection and sound system was added, including support for the screening of 3-D films. A new screen was also installed, the concessions area updated, new carpeting and paint, and a new marquee and signage outside. The theater was still able to present films in 70mm and three-panel Cinerama formats.

=== 2014 renovation ===
The theater closed again in August 2014 for renovations. It reopened on November 20, for a screening of The Hunger Games: Mockingjay – Part 1.

This third renovation of Cinerama included many changes. The theater's capacity was reduced from 798 to 560 seats (a stated 390 on the Main Level and 170 in the Balcony, however only 546 tickets are generally available for purchase), allowing for more leg room and wider seats. The number of speakers was increased to 110 from the original 65, with some accompanying acoustical changes. A Dolby Atmos sound system and a Christie 6P dual laser projector were installed (the latter being the world's first commercial installation).

=== 2020 renovation and closure ===
Paul Allen died in 2018. The theater closed for a fourth renovation in February 2020, and all but two of its staff were laid off. Planned updates included new carpeting and kitchen equipment. A reopening date was expected to be within the 2020 calendar year. In May 2020, the Seattle Cinerama, citing the economic effects of the COVID-19 pandemic, announced that it would remain closed for the foreseeable future. A petition to save and reopen the theater was launched in October 2021, ultimately garnering over 12,000 signatures.

=== Sale to SIFF ===
The Allen estate sold the theater to the Seattle International Film Festival (SIFF) in May 2023 for $4.5 million. The fee was paid through a loan from Far Star Ventures, who had previously helped SIFF acquire the Uptown Theater in 2014; proceeds from the future sale of air rights over the property are planned to be split between SIFF and the Allen estate. SIFF reopened the theater months before the festival's 50th anniversary in 2024; the reopened cinema no longer carried the Cinerama name due to licensing issues.

The Seattle City Council approved a $950,000 grant to SIFF to fund the reopening of the Cinerama. The Metropolitan King County Council approved their own $1 million grant a week later that would draw from unused state and federal pandemic relief funds. The first screening at the reopened theater was the private premiere of The Boys in the Boat on December 7, 2023. The theater fully reopened on December 14 under the name SIFF Cinema Downtown with a screening of Wonka.

== Festivals and events held at Cinerama ==
From 1976 to 2018, the Seattle Cinerama hosted a number of festivals and events:

- Seattle International Film Festival (SIFF): Held annually since 1976, the theater has functioned as one of the festival's venues, most recently in 2015.
- SFFSFF: The EMP Museum, in collaboration with SIFF, operates the annual festival showcasing animated and live-action science fiction, fantasy, and horror-tinged short film from around the globe at the theater.
- Emerald City Comicon Cinema Series: Cinerama and the Emerald City Comicon have partnered since 2014 to bring together movie stars to talk about their films in Q&A sessions. Notable attendees include Stan Lee, Alan Tudyk, Karl Urban and Michael Biehn.
- Fists & Fury: Established in 2015, the inaugural mixed martial arts film festival featured rarely screened Bruce Lee titles such as Enter the Dragon and The Chinese Connection, as well as other popular films of the genre including Kill Bill: Volume 1, Kill Bill: Volume 2 and Kung Fu Hustle.
- 70mm Film Fest: Run quasi-annually since the fall of 2011, the 70mm fest seeks to showcase the decaying large screen format. Titles include original 70mm classics like 2001: A Space Odyssey, Lawrence of Arabia and Tron as well as blow ups of 35mm productions like Life Force and new titles like The Master, Interstellar and The Hateful Eight. The 70mm Film Festival was held from September 7–20, 2018.

== Notable screenings ==
2001: A Space Odyssey had a run at Seattle Cinerama for nearly 2 1/2 years following its original release in the fall of 1968. Warner Brothers chose the Seattle Cinerama as the theater in which to premiere the newly restored 70mm print of 2001: A Space Odyssey. The film opened on October 5, 2001, and eventually opened in other cities around North America the following month. In 2012, Paul Allen paid for a new 70mm print of 2001: A Space Odyssey to be produced for the first annual Cinerama Science Fiction Film Festival. Due to rights issues, the studios own the new print. It has, however, been placed on "permanent loan" to the Seattle Cinerama.

Beginning with The Great Gatsby on June 5, 2013, the theater began "2D Tuesdays", a showing of 2D versions of all 3D films every Tuesday. During the final weekend of September that year, the Cinerama concluded the "Big Screen 70mm Festival" with a rare screening of original 3-strip Cinerama films, using the three projection booths. How the West Was Won played daily Friday thru Sunday, with a screening of This Is Cinerama on Saturday evening.

In March 2016, the Cinerama was one of only ten theaters in the nation to show Batman v Superman: Dawn of Justice in 70mm for its first week. The following month, Quentin Tarantino's extended "70mm Roadshow" version of The Hateful Eight was shown in Ultra Panavision 70. The theater held a two-week screening in early November of Mad Max: Fury Road Black and Chrome Edition, followed by a week-long run of the debut of Fantastic Beasts and Where to Find Them in 70mm, one of ten theaters in the country to do so.

== Other Cinerama film venues ==
In addition to the Seattle Cinerama, the two theaters in the world still capable of showing three-panel Cinerama films are the Cinerama Dome at ArcLight Cinemas in Los Angeles, and the Pictureville Cinema at the National Science and Media Museum in Bradford, West Yorkshire, England.
