= Dorothy Bohm =

German-born British photographer (1924–2023)

- Born: Dorothea Israelit; 22 June 1924; Königsberg, East Prussia, Weimar Republic (present-day Kaliningrad, Russia)
- Died: 15 March 2023 (aged 98); London, England
- Education: Manchester Municipal College of Technology
- Known for: Portraiture, street photography, early adoption of colour
- Style: Photography
- Spouse: Louis Bohm
- Children: 2
- Awards: Honorary fellowship of the Royal Photographic Society (2009)
- Website: www.dorothybohm.com

Dorothy Bohm (22 June 1924 – 15 March 2023) was a German-born British photographer based in London, known for her portraiture, street photography, early adoption of colour, and photography of London and Paris; she is considered one of the doyennes of British photography.

== Life and career ==
Bohm was born Dorothea Israelit in June 1924 in Königsberg, East Prussia (now Kaliningrad, Russia), to a German-speaking family of Jewish-Lithuanian origins. From 1932 to 1939 she lived with her family in Lithuania, first in Memel (now Klaipėda) and later in Šiauliai. She was sent to England in 1939 to escape Nazism: first to a boarding school in Ditchling, Sussex, but soon to Manchester, where her brother was a student, and where she met Louis Bohm (whom she would marry in 1945).

Bohm studied photography at the Manchester Municipal College of Technology, from which she received a diploma; she also received a certificate in photography from City and Guilds. She had worked under the photographer Samuel Cooper for four years until she set up her own portrait studio, Studio Alexander, in 1946, using her nom de guerre Dorothy Alexander. (She would sell the studio in 1958.) Samples from this early portrait work would be exhibited decades later.

Bohm's husband worked for a petrochemical company that obliged him to move around the world. In 1947 she made the first of several visits to Paris, where she lived with her husband from 1954 to 1955. In the 1950s she also lived in New York and San Francisco, in 1956 travelling to Mexico, where she photographed in colour for the first time. She lived in Hampstead from 1956.

By the late 1950s, Bohm had abandoned studio portraiture in favour of street photography, but was still working predominantly in black and white; in 1980 she was persuaded by André Kertész to experiment with colour, which she did for two years using a Polaroid SX-70 instant camera. She used colour negative film from 1984, and from 1985 worked exclusively in colour.

This early work of Bohm's has been described by Monica Bohm-Duchen as "humanist street photography, capturing the moment in the manner of Henri Cartier-Bresson" whilst "people are often surprised by the youth and vibrancy of her colour work. She focuses on fragments of the urban landscape ... that are otherwise overlooked. These photographs have an abstract quality; there's a deliberate spatial ambiguity and you're not quite sure what you're looking at. But nothing is manipulated – she will still only work with film."

A major 1969 exhibition in the Institute of Contemporary Arts titled Spectrum and consisting of a main exhibition called Woman and four smaller exhibitions showing photography by Bohm, Don McCullin, Tony Ray-Jones and Enzo Ragazzini, drew a public response that encouraged one of its organizers, Sue Davies, to embark on founding the UK's first photography gallery, The Photographers' Gallery, which opened in 1971. Bohm's show was titled People at Peace and she said: "I photograph the humble, the anonymous - those who are spontaneous and mirror all of us." Bohm was later described as the Gallery's Associate Director.

Bohm visited South Africa for five weeks in 1974, later exhibiting photographs taken there at the Photographers' Gallery in April 1975. With Helena Kovac, she also founded the Focus Gallery for Photography in 1998; the gallery closed in 2004. She was awarded an honorary fellowship of the Royal Photographic Society in November 2009.

Bohm had two daughters, one of whom, Monica Bohm-Duchen, is an art historian and curator.

Bohm said about her work:

The photograph fulfils my deep need to stop things from disappearing. It makes transience less painful and retains something of the special magic, which I have looked for and found. I have tried to create order out of chaos, to find stability in flux and beauty in the most unlikely places.

Bohm died in London on 15 March 2023, at the age of 98.

== Publications ==
- Dorothy Bohm. A World Observed. London: Hugh Evelyn, 1970. With Introduction by Roland Penrose.
- Dorothy Bohm and Ian Norrie. Hampstead: London Hill Town. London: Wildwood House, 1981. ISBN 0704530600.
- Ian Norrie and Dorothy Bohm. A Celebration of London, Walks around the Capital. London: André Deutsch, 1984. ISBN 0233975012.
  - Walks around London: A Celebration of the Capital. London: André Deutsch, 1986. ISBN 0233978534.
- Dorothy Bohm Photographs. Jerusalem: The Israel Museum, 1986. Text by Nissan Perez. ISBN 9652780499. Only black and white images of an exhibition that had included both black and white and colour images.
- Dorothy Bohm. Egypt. London: Thames & Hudson, 1989. ISBN 0500541507. With foreword by Lawrence Durrell and text by Ian Jeffrey.
- Dorothy Bohm. Venice. London: Thames & Hudson, 1992. ISBN 050054171X. Text by Ian Jeffrey.
- Dorothy Bohm. Colour Photography 1984–94. London: The Photographers' Gallery, 1994. ISBN 0907879446. Text by Ian Jeffrey.
- Dorothy Bohm. Sixties London. London: Lund Humphries / The Photographers' Gallery, 1996. ISBN 0853316996. Texts by Amanda Hopkinson and Ian Jeffrey.
- Dorothy Bohm. Walls and Windows. London: Lund Humphries; Bath: The Royal Photographic Society, 1998. ISBN 0853317186. Texts by Mark Haworth-Booth and Monica Bohm-Duchen.
- Dorothy Bohm. Inside London. London: Lund Humphries / The Photographers' Gallery, 2000. ISBN 0853317801. Texts by Martin Harrison and Jessica Duchen.
- Dorothy Bohm. Breaks in Communication. Göttingen: Steidl, 2002. ISBN 3882438134. Text by Martin Harrison.
- Mátyás Sárközy and Dorothy Bohm. Albion köd nélkül. Pécs: Jelenkor Kiadó, 2004. ISBN 9636763577.
- Dorothy Bohm. Un Amour de Paris. Paris: Paris Musées, 2005. ISBN 2879008964. Texts by Mark Haworth-Booth, Lynne Woolfson and Françoise Reynaud.
- Dorothy Bohm. Ambiguous Realities by Dorothy Bohm. Ben Uri Gallery and Museum, 2007. ISBN 978-0900157103.
- Dorothy Bohm. Ambiguous Realities: Colour Photographs by Dorothy Bohm. London: Ben Uri Gallery, 2007. ISBN 0900157100. Text by Monica Bohm-Duchen.
- David Hawkins, ed. A World Observed, 1940–2010: Photographs by Dorothy Bohm. London: Philip Wilson; Manchester: Manchester Art Gallery, 2010. ISBN 0856676888, ISBN 0901673765. Texts by Monica Bohm-Duchen, Colin Ford, and Ian Jeffrey.
- Dorothy Bohm. About Women. Stockport, Cheshire: Dewi Lewis, 2016. ISBN 978-1-907893-81-0.

== Exhibitions ==
=== Solo ===
- 1969 People at Peace, part of Four Photographers in Contrast (with Don McCullin, Tony Ray-Jones and Enzo Ragazzini) at Institute of Contemporary Arts, London.
- 1976 Exhibition of London photographs at ll Diaframma Gallery, Milan. A smaller version of this exhibition was also shown at the Marjorie Neikrug gallery in New York.
- 1976 Impressions of South Africa, at The Photographers' Gallery, London.
- 1981 A Sense of Place, retrospective exhibition at the Camden Arts Centre, London.
- 1984 Exhibition of Polaroid images of London at the Contrast Gallery, London.
- 1986 Retrospective at the Israel Museum, Jerusalem, with a catalogue published by the Museum.
- 1994 Dorothy Bohm: Colour Photography 1984–94, The Photographers' Gallery, London, with catalogue published by the Gallery.
- 1997 Exhibition of photographs from Sixties London at Museum of London.
- 1998 Walls and Windows, exhibition of colour photographs 1994–1998 at Royal Photographic Society, Bath and Royal National Theatre, London, with accompanying book published by Lund Humphries.
- 1998 Exhibition of still-life images at Artmonsky Arts, London.
- 1999 Retrospective at Focus Gallery (London).
- 1999 Colour Photographs at Focus Gallery (London).
- 2002 Exhibition of Hungarian images at Hungarian Cultural Institute, London.
- 2002 Exhibition of large colour photographs from Breaks in Communication at Victoria and Albert Museum and Focus Gallery, London.
- 2003 Exhibition of Hampstead images at Hampstead Museum, London.
- 2005 Photographs of Mexico at The Photographers' Gallery, London.
- 2005 Un Amour de Paris, major retrospective of Paris photographs 1947–2003, Musée Carnavalet, Paris, accompanied by catalogue in English and French published by Paris Musées.
- 2005 Exhibition of vintage black and white images of London and Paris, The Photographers' Gallery, London.
- 2006 Smaller version of Musée Carnavalet Paris exhibition shown at Das Verborgene Museum, Berlin
- 2007 Ambiguous Realities: Colour Photographs by Dorothy Bohm, exhibition at Ben Uri Gallery, London
- 2007 Israel in Black and White: Photographs by Dorothy Bohm, exhibition at Corman Arts, London
- 2010 A World Observed 1940–2010, a major retrospective, Manchester City Art Gallery. 24 April – 30 August.
- 2010 Dorothy Bohm Vintage Photographs, exhibition at Zoe Bingham Fine Art, London.
- 2011 A World Observed 1940–2010, a major retrospective, Sainsbury Centre for Visual Arts, Norwich
- 2012 Seeing and Feeling, Margaret Street Gallery, London
- 2016 Sixties London, Jewish Museum, London
- 2018–19 Little Happenings: Photographs of Children, V&A Museum of Childhood, London

May & June 2019 – Colour Photographs by Dorothy Bohm and AVIVSON GALLERY IN HIGHGATE, LONDON

=== Group ===
- 1978 Paris Seen, Graves Art Gallery, Sheffield.
- 1989 City Lights, Goldsmiths' College, London
- 2003 London Cultural Capital, The Photographers' Gallery, London
- 2007 How We Are: Photographing Britain, Tate Britain, London.
- 2012 Another London: International Photographers Capture City Life 1930–1980, Tate Britain, London

== Permanent collections ==
- Victoria and Albert Museum (London)
- Tate (London and elsewhere)
- Musée Carnavalet (Paris)
