= Tony Ray-Jones =

English photographer

- Born: 7 June 1941; Wells, Somerset, England
- Died: 13 March 1972 (aged 30); London
- Occupation: Photographer
- Known for: Beachy Head boat trip, 1967
- Spouse: Anna Ray-Jones
- Parent: Raymond Ray-Jones

Tony Ray-Jones (7 June 1941 – 13 March 1972) was an English photographer.

== Life ==
Born Holroyd Anthony Ray-Jones in Wells, Somerset, he was the youngest son of Raymond Ray-Jones (1886–1942), a painter and etcher who died when Tony was only eight months old, and Effie Irene Pearce, who would work as a physiotherapist. After his father's death, Tony's mother took the family to Tonbridge in Kent, to Little Baddow (near Chelmsford, Essex), and then to Hampstead in London. He was educated at Christ's Hospital (Horsham), which he hated.

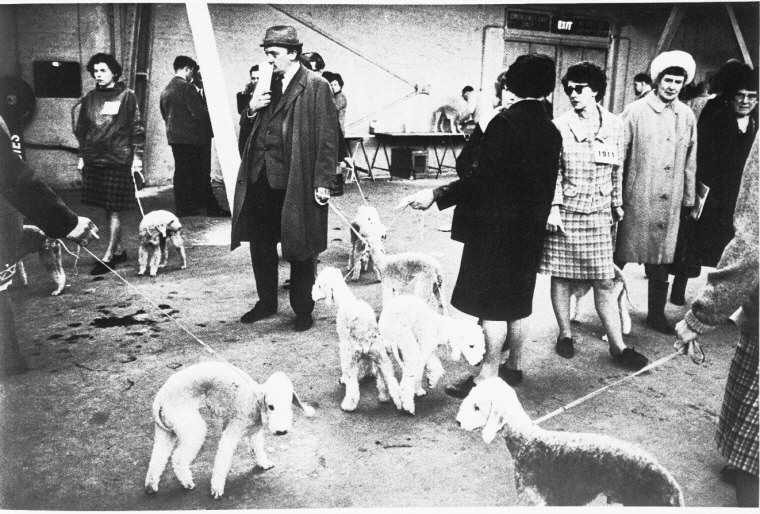
'Crufts Dog Show 1968' by Ray-Jones

Tony Ray-Jones studied at the London School of Printing, where he concentrated on graphic design. In the early 1960s he obtained a scholarship that enabled him to join Yale University School of Art on the strength of photographs he had taken in north Africa from a taxi window. Although only 19 on his arrival at Yale, Ray-Jones' talent was obvious, and in 1963 he was given assignments for the magazines Car and Driver and Saturday Evening Post.

Eager to use photography for more creative purposes, Ray-Jones went to the Design Lab held by the art director Alexey Brodovitch in the Manhattan studio of Richard Avedon; Brodovitch's gruff manner and high standards won respect and hard work from Ray-Jones and others. Ray-Jones also got to know a number of New York "street photographers", such as Joel Meyerowitz, a fellow Brodovich student at the time. Ray-Jones graduated from Yale in 1964 and photographed the United States energetically until his departure for Britain in late 1965. From then until 1970, he lived and worked at 102 Gloucester Place, Marylebone; this is now marked by a memorial plaque.

On his return to Britain, he was shocked at the lack of interest in non-commercial photography, let alone in the publication of books presenting it. He was also unsure of what subject he might pursue, but the idea of a survey of the English at leisure gradually took shape. He began work on that, at the same time doing portrait and other work for the Radio Times, Sunday newspapers, and magazines.

In the October 1968 issue of Creative Camera magazine, he described what he was trying to achieve:

My aim is to communicate something of the spirit and the mentality of the English, their habits and their way of life, the ironies that exist in the way they do things, partly through their traditions and partly through the nature of their environment and their mentality. For me there is something very special about the English 'way of life' and I wish to record it from my particular point of view before it becomes Americanised and disappears.

His photographs of festivals and leisure activities are full of a somewhat surreal humour, and show the influence of photographers such as Henri Cartier-Bresson, Garry Winogrand, as well as his own collection of the work of Sir Benjamin Stone.

In 1969, Architectural Review magazine commissioned photojournalists for eight themed issues called Manplan, examining the contemporary state of architecture and town planning. The photos were published between September 1969 and September 1970. Ray-Jones's work documenting people living on housing estates in Britain was published in an issue on housing in 1970, and were included in his second unsuccessful submission to join Magnum Photos.

Critic Sean O'Hagan wrote in The Guardian:

Ray-Jones was in many ways a social anthropologist with a camera, but it is his eye for detail and often brilliantly complex compositions that sets him apart. His images often appear cluttered ... On closer inspection, though, what we are glimpsing is several small narratives contained in the bigger defining one."

Ray-Jones was both sociable and abrasive, introducing himself to Bill Jay, the editor of Creative Camera, by saying "Your magazine's shit, but I can see you're trying. You just don't know enough, so I am here to help you". However, he impressed Jay (who later acknowledged Ray-Jones as one of the greatest influences on his view of photography), and also worked hard and successfully to have exhibitions of his works.

He returned to the United States in January 1971 to work as a teacher at the San Francisco Art Institute – one of the few ways in which he could legally stay in the US. He disliked teaching, finding the students self-centred and lazy, but he was soon able to busy himself working on assignments for both the British and the US press.

Ray-Jones's non-assignment photographs were first published in the October 1968 issue of Creative Camera.

In late 1971, Ray-Jones started to suffer from exhaustion. Early the next year leukaemia was diagnosed, and he started chemotherapy. Medical treatment in the US was too expensive, so Ray-Jones flew to London on 10 March 1972 and immediately entered the Royal Marsden Hospital; he died there on 13 March.

Sean O'Hagan said "in his short life he helped create a way of seeing that has shaped several generations of British photography."

== Legacy ==
Ray-Jones' book about the English, unfinished at the time of his death, was published posthumously by Thames & Hudson in 1974 as A Day Off: An English Journal.

Ray-Jones' archive has been housed at the National Science and Media Museum in Bradford since 1993. It consists of 700 photographic prints, 1,700 negative sheets, 2,700 contact sheets, 10,000 colour transparencies and Ray-Jones' notebooks and correspondence.

== Publications ==
- A Day Off: An English Journal.
  - London: Thames & Hudson, 1974. Hardback ISBN 978-0-500-54012-1.
  - London: Thames & Hudson, 1975. Paperback ISBN 978-0-500-27034-9. Second edition.
  - A Day Off: 120 Photographs. Waterbury, CT: New York Graphic Society, 1977. Paperback ISBN 0-8212-0708-3.
  - Loisirs anglais: 120 photographies de Tony Ray Jones. Paris: Éditions du Chêne, 1974. OCLC 26480887.
- Tony Ray-Jones. Edited by Richard Ehrlich. Manchester: Cornerhouse, 1990. ISBN 0-948797-36-3 (paper); ISBN 0-948797-31-2 (cloth). Also New York, NY: Aperture, 1991 ISBN 978-0-893814-84-7. Exhibition catalogue, includes biography and photographs.
- Tony Ray-Jones. By Russell Roberts. London: Chris Boot, 2004. ISBN 0-9542813-9-X. Introduction by Russell Roberts; transcript of interview between Bill Jay and Martin Parr.
- American Colour 1962–1965. London: Mack, 2013. ISBN 978-1-907-94655-4. Introduction by Liz Jobey.
- Only in England: Photographs by Tony Ray-Jones. Bradford: National Science and Media Museum, 2013. ISBN 978-1-900747-67-7. OCLC 870756771. Exhibition catalogue. Introductions by Hannah Redler and Greg Hobson, essays by Martin Parr, David Alan Mellor and Ian Walker. The photographs are grouped into 'The English Unseen: Tony Ray-Jones Photographs Newly Selected by Martin Parr' and 'The English Seen: Classic Tony Ray-Jones Photographs'.
- Tony Ray-Jones. RRB/Martin Parr Foundation, 2019. With an introduction by Martin Parr and an essay by Liz Jobey.
  - French-language edition. Paris: Maison CF, 2019.

== Exhibitions (incomplete) ==
- Current Report 2, Museum of Modern Art, New York, 1968. With others.
- Vision and Expression, George Eastman House, Rochester, New York, 1969
- The English Seen, part of The Spectrum series, Institute of Contemporary Arts (ICA), London, 1969. Solo show.
- Personal Views, ICA, London, 1970. With others.
- Rencontre Gallery, Paris, 1970
- Photographs of the English, San Francisco Museum of Modern Art, 1972
- Four Photographers in Contrast (with Dorothy Bohm, Don McCullin, and Enzo Ragazzini), ICA, London
- Tony Ray-Jones. Touring exhibition organised by the Photographers' Gallery, 1990
- A 'father and son' exhibition for Raymond and Tony Ray-Jones, the Astley Cheetham Art Gallery, Ashton-under-Lyne, England, 1996
- A Gentle Madness: The Photographs of Tony Ray-Jones (1941–72), National Museum of Photography, Film & Television, Bradford, England, 2004; and toured to Rencontres d'Arles, 2004; Nederlands Fotomuseum, Rotterdam, 2005.
- Les Rencontres d'Arles festival, France, 2004
- The Guernsey Photography Festival, 2011
- Mass Photography: Blackpool through the Camera, Grundy Art Gallery, Blackpool, England, 2011
- Only in England: Photographs by Tony Ray-Jones and Martin Parr, Media Space, Science Museum, London, 19 September 2013 – 16 March 2014; National Science and Media Museum, Bradford, 28 March – 29 June 2014; Walker Art Gallery, Liverpool, 13 February – 7 June 2015. With material from the National Science and Media Museum's Ray-Jones archive curated by Martin Parr and Greg Hobson.

== Commissioned magazine work ==
- "Passport to Cornwall", Sunday Times Magazine, 25 September 1966 V.I. No. 29/30, 1966.
- "The Island", Cycle magazine, October 1967.
- "Britten Country", Opera News, 11 February 1967.
- "Manplan 8", Architectural Review, September 1970.
- "Happy Extremists", Sunday Times Magazine, 18 October 1970.
- "The All American Love Nest", Sunday Times Magazine, 28 March 1971.
- "The Air Conditioned Zion", Sunday Times Magazine, 21 November 1971.
- "There's thirteen hundred and fifty-two guitar-pickers in Nashville...", Sunday Times Magazine, 22 February 1972.

== Collections ==
Criticism arose in 2026 when the Reform-led Kent County Council announced plans to auction off a collection of artworks, induing several Tony Ray-Jones photographs of the area, from his series A Day Off.

Other images by Ray-Jones are in the Robert Elwall Photographs Collection, British Architectural Library, Royal Institute of British Architects (RIBA), London.

== See also ==
- Martin Parr
