= Science Fiction Fantasy Short Film Festival =

- Status: Active
- Genre: Fantasy/science fiction
- Venue: Seattle Cinerama
- Location: Seattle, Washington
- Country: United States
- Inaugurated: 2006
- Organizer: Museum of Pop Culture and SIFF
- Website: https://www.mopop.org/programs/science-fiction-and-fantasy-short-film-festival

The Science Fiction Fantasy Short Film Festival (SFFSFF) is an international genre film festival devoted to fantasy and science fiction cinema from across the globe. The SFFSFF takes place annually every winter in Seattle, Washington at the world-renowned Seattle Cinerama Theater. The festival brings together industry professionals in filmmaking and the genres of science fiction and fantasy to encourage and support new, creative additions to science fiction and fantasy cinema arts. The (SFFSFF) is a co-production of the Museum of Pop Culture (formerly called EMP) and SIFF.

== Overview ==
Originally, the festival when it was announced in 2005 was named the Science Fiction Short Film Festival. The word and subject field of Fantasy was added later for the 2009 edition. SFFSFF's mission is to promote and encourage awareness, appreciation and understanding of the art of science fiction & fantasy cinema. "Seattle’s robust art scene and strong film culture offers opportunities for creative filmmakers to tell stories within the framework of science fiction, and fosters a connection between filmmakers, directors, producers, writers and audiences," said Therese Littleton, EMP/SFM spokesperson. "This is a great event to recognize achievement and innovation in science fiction filmmaking and storytelling disciplines and EMP/SFM is very proud to be a part of it." Submissions will be judged based on originality, quality, artistic merit, innovation, voice, style and narrative. A nationally recognized panel of distinguished film, television, literature, and science fiction industry professionals, peers and film critics has reviewed qualifying submissions each year of the festival to select the winners.

== Past festivals ==
=== 2006 ===
The first Science Fiction Short Film Festival was held February 4, 2006 at the Seattle Cinerama Theater in Seattle, Washington. Twenty original short films were showcased in competition to win a development pitch with the SCI FI Channel. Thirteen of the twenty directors were able to attend the festival; two traveling to Seattle from as far away as Israel and Ireland.

Short films presented

- They're Made Out of Meat
- Red Planet Blues
- Microgravity
- Cost of Living
- Circus of Infinity
- Heartbeat
- Cost of Living
- Scribble
- Heyday
- The Grandfather Paradox
- La Vie d'un Chien (The Life of a Dog)
- A Piece of Wood
- Perfect Heat
- Skewed
- Killswitch
- Wireless
- Into the Maelstrom
- neoplasia
- Welcome to Eden
- The Hard Ages-Trial Run
- Super-Anon

Awards

- Grand Prize: They're Made Out of Meat (Ireland), Director: Stephen O'Regan
- Second Place: Red Planet Blues (USA), Director: David H. Brooks
- Third Place: Microgravity (USA), Director: David Sanders
- Honorable Mention: Cost of Living (Canada), Director: Jonathan Joffe
- Honorable Mention: Circus of Infinity (USA), Director: Sue Corcoran
- Honorable Mention: Heartbeat(Israel), Director: Omri Bar-Levy
- Audience Favorite: Cost of Living (Canada), Director: Jonathan Joffe
- Douglas Trumbull Award for Best Special Effects: Microgravity (USA), Director: by David Sanders

Festival Jury

- Richard Hutton
- Douglas Trumbull
- Thomas Vitale
- Craig Engler
- Kathleen Murphy
- Vonda McIntyre
- Lawrence Krauss
- Jacob McMurray
- Beth Barrett

=== 2007 ===
On February 3, 2007, the second annual Science Fiction Short Film Festival was held at the Seattle Cinerama Theater in Seattle, Washington. The sci fi festival played to a sold-out crowd for the second year in a row. Out of a field of dozens of entries, the best short science fiction films were selected from around the United States and from as far away as England, Australia, and Taiwan. A jury of media professionals selected the best films of the 20 screened. At the festival, filmmakers answered audience questions while the crowd voted on their favorite film.

Short films presented

- Transgressions
- The Un-Gone
- Ways to Die at Home
- Maklar, Anyone?
- Atomic Banana
- Singularity
- The Inedible Bulk
- Machinations
- Fantastic Fortune
- F*ck You, Pay Me
- The Realm
- Spaceball
- Haunted Planet
- Life Signs
- Project K.A.T.
- TV Man
- Mizar
- Agnieszka
- The Tragical Historie of Guidolon the Giant Space Chicken
- Face Machine

Awards

- Grand Prize: Transgressions (USA), Director: Valerie Weiss
- Second Place: The Un-Gone (UK), Director: Simon Bovey
- Third Place: 13 Ways to Die at Home (USA), Director: Lee Lanier
- Audience Favorite: Maklar, Anyone? (USA), Director: Phil Guzzo
- Douglas Trumbull Award for Best Special Effects: 13 Ways to Die at Home (USA), Director: Lee Lanier

=== 2008 ===
On February 2, 2008, the annual Science Fiction Short Film Festival was held at the Seattle Cinerama Theater in Seattle, Washington. The Science Fiction Short Film Festival promotes and encourages an awareness, appreciation and understanding of the art of science fiction cinema. Its mandate is to create a forum for creative artistry in science fiction film and recognize the most outstanding short films produced. A pitch meeting with SCI FI Channel executives for a chance to potentially write or direct a two-hour film for the network was the grand prize.

Short films presented

- Adam, Vampire
- Alpha Worm
- The Apparatus
- E:D:E:N
- Eggworld
- Lucidity
- Monster Job Hunter
- Not 2b Toyed With
- The Recordist
- The Nothing Pill
- Avant Petalos Grillados
- EEE-Funk
- Escape! From Robot Island
- Forecast
- Four Corners
- Graw
- I Was a Creature From Outer Space!
- The Mourner
- Operation: Fish
- What Love Remains

Awards

- Grand Prize: Forecast (USA), Director: Erik Courtney
- Second Place: Four Corners (USA), Director: Douglas Mueller
- Third Place: Escape! From Robot Island (USA), Director: Tim Thompson
- Audience Favorite: E:D:E:N (Italy), Director: Fabio Guaglione
- Douglas Trumbull Award for Best Special Effects: Operation: Fish (USA), Director: Jeff Riley

=== 2009 ===
On February 7, 2009, the annual Science Fiction + Fantasy Short Film Festival was held at the Seattle Cinerama Theater in Seattle, Washington. The festival brings together industry professionals in filmmaking and the genres of science fiction and fantasy to encourage and support new, creative additions to science fiction and fantasy cinema arts.

Short films presented

- BAIT
- Bugbear
- The Communicators
- Hose
- Notes from the Acrid Plain with Burton Hoary, Vol. 7
- Outsource
- Scion
- The Whistler
- Wishing Well
- Wormhole Chasers
- Abigail
- Beatgirl – A Piece of Action!
- Collector
- Eel Girl
- F A D E
- The Heist
- Hirsute
- Six Impossible Things
- Things Last
- The Tiny Spaceship

Awards

- Grand Prize: F A D E (Australia), Director: Vincent Taylor
- Second Place: Outsource (USA), Director: Daniel Trezise
- Third Place: Notes from the Acrid Plain with Burton Hoary, Vol. 7(USA), Director: Jonathan Ashley
- Audience Favorite: Hirsute (Canada), Director: A.J. Bond
- Douglas Trumbull Award for Best Special Effects: Outsource (USA), Director: Daniel Trezise

Festival Jury

- Erik Courtney
- Jesse Harris
- Daniel Myrick
- Marc Scott Zicree
- Daniel Thornton
- Aristomenis Tsirbas
- Chris Weitz

=== 2010 ===
The Science Fiction + Fantasy Short Film Festival promotes and encourages an awareness, appreciation and understanding of the art of science fiction and fantasy cinema. Its mandate is to create a forum for creative artistry in science fiction and fantasy film and recognize the most outstanding short films produced. On January 30, 2010, the annual Science Fiction Short Film Festival will be held at the Seattle Cinerama Theater in Seattle, Washington. 10 short films will screen in the first session 4:00pm – 6:00pm; 10 short films will screen in the second session 7:00pm – 9:00pm. An awards ceremony follows the second session.

Short films presented

- Alma
- Beast of Burden
- Charlie Thistle
- Die Schneider Krankheit
- Extra-Ordinary
- S.S. Humanity
- Shuttle T-42
- The Control Master
- The Kirkie
- To the Moon
- Afterglow
- Arthur's Lore
- Burden
- CC 2010
- Elder Sign
- Hands Off!
- Hangar No. 5
- Nanosporin AI
- Singularity
- Third Days Child

Awards

- Grand Prize: The Control Master
- Second Place: Alma
- Third Place: Charlie Thistle
- Audience Favorite: Charlie Thistle
- Douglas Trumbull Award for Best Special Effects: Hangar No. 5

Festival Jury

- A.J. Bond
- Jesse Harris
- Susan LaSalle
- Howard McCain
- Daniel Myrick
- Vincent Taylor
- Marc Scott Zicree

=== 2011 ===
The Science Fiction + Fantasy Short Film Festival promotes and encourages an awareness, appreciation and understanding of the art of science fiction and fantasy cinema. Its mandate is to create a forum for creative artistry in science fiction and fantasy film and recognize the most outstanding short films produced. On January 29, 2011, the annual Science Fiction Short Film Festival will be held at the Seattle Cinerama Theater in Seattle, Washington. 10 short films will screen in the first session 4:00pm – 6:00pm; 10 short films will screen in the second session 7:30pm – 9:30pm. An awards ceremony follows the second session.

Short films presented

- All the Time in the World
- The Astronomer's Sun
- Cockpit: The Rule of Engagement
- Denmark
- Emma
- Hector Corps.
- Juan Con Miedo
- Keep Watching The Skies!
- King Eternal
- Liveline
- Local Unite
- Necronomicon
- Project Panacea
- Schizofredric
- Spark
- Super Science
- Televisnu
- TUB
- The Wonder Hospital
- Zero

Awards

- Grand Prize: The Astronomer's Sun
- Second Place: Schizofredric
- Third Place: All the Time in the World
- Audience Favorite: Hectors Corps.
- Douglas Trumbull Award for Best Special Effects: Cockpit: The Rule of Engagement

Festival Jury

- Barbara Brown
- Ben Kasulke
- Howard McCain
- Annalee Newitz
- Bragi Schut Jr.
- Lindy West
- Daniel Wilson

=== 2012 ===
Short films presented

- Time Freak
- Decapoda Shock
- Chorebot
- Attack of the Killer Mutant Chickens (Murgi Keno Mutant)
- Dolls Factory (Fábrica de Muñecas)
- Matter Fisher
- The Comet Chronicles
- Terminus
- Oliver Bump’s Birthday
- Dead Happy
- Mahahula the Giant Rodent of Happiness
- The Dungeon Master
- Birdboy
- The Epiphany
- The Captivus
- Crystal Jam
- Protoparticulas
- The Sierra Project
- Carta A Julia
- Madame Perrault’s Bluebeard
- The Hunger and the Swan Discuss Their Meeting

Awards

- Grand Prize: The Hunger and the Swan Discuss Their Meeting
- Second Place: Time Freak
- Third Place: Terminus
- Douglas Trumbull Award for Best Special Effects: Terminus
- Audience Choice: Time Freak

Festival Jury

- Jon Landau
- Simon Cartwright
- Jessica Cope
- Howard McCain
- Ilona Rossman Ho
- Adam Sekular
- Paul Constant
- David Goldberg

=== 2013 ===
Short films presented

- Lucky Day Forever
- Small Time
- Tumult
- Luminaris
- The Gate
- 88:88
- Cats in Space
- Cheap Extermination
- Evelyn
- Foxes
- Frankie Rulez!!!
- Giant Monster Playset
- Oowiewanna
- A Lost and Found Box of Human Sensation
- Motorhome
- The Narrative of Victor Karloch
- Posthuman
- Thumb Snatchers from the Moon Cocoon
- You, Me + We
- The Wheel
- Zing

Awards

- Grand Prize: Lucky Day Forever
- First Runner-up : Tumult
- Second Runner-up: Luminaris
- Douglas Trumbull Award for Best Special Effects: The Gate
- Audience Award: Small Time

Festival Jury

- Sue Corcoran
- Robert Horton
- Bear McCreary
- Charles Mudede
- Andrew Allen
- Jason Sondhi
- Rider and Shiloh Strong

=== 2014 ===
In partnership with SIFF, EMP Museum (now called the Museum of Pop Culture) presented the ninth annual Science Fiction + Fantasy Short Film Festival at the Seattle Cinerama on January 11, 2014.

Short films presented

- Sleepworking
- RPG OKC
- Louder, Please
- Night Giant
- Voice Over
- The Beyond
- Bless You
- The Decelerators
- Drain
- Emit
- Honeymoon Suite
- The Magic Salmon
- Mirage
- North Bay
- Robota
- Red Summer
- Shift
- Spacetime Fabric Softener
- Star-Crossed
- Willowshade

Awards

- Grand Prize: Sleepworking
- First Runner-up : Louder, Please
- Second Runner-up: Night Giant
- Douglas Trumbull Award for Best Special Effects: Voice Over
- Audience Award: RPG OKC

Festival Jury

- John Joseph Adams
- SJ Chiro
- Laura Jean Cronin
- Cheryl Henson
- David Barr Kirtley
- Marc Laidlaw
- Seth Sommerfeld

=== 2015 ===
The 15th Annual Science Fiction + Fantasy Short Film Fest took place at the Seattle Cinerama on Saturday, February 7, 2015. In addition to the main program on Saturday and Encore presentation on Sunday, special events were added on Friday, February 6: Escape from New York with a Live Score by Roladex, and SFFSFF The Dark Side, a presentation of horror-tinged and macabre shorts with its own awards following the screening.

Short films presented

- In the Beginning
- Tempête sur anorak (Storm Hits Jacket)
- Time Travel Lover
- Destiny
- Wanderers
- The Looking Planet
- Lessons Learned
- The Nostalgist
- Making Friends
- Little Quentin
- Pandy (Pandas)
- The Master’s Voice: caveirão
- Sorry About Tomorrow
- A Stitch in Time (for $9.99)
- LUCID
- Wakening
- Day 40
- Caldera
- Gumdrop

Awards

- Grand Prize: Caldera
- First Runner-up : In the Beginning
- Second Runner-up: Little Quentin
- Douglas Trumbull Award for Best Special Effects: Gumdrop
- Audience Award: In the Beginning

The Dark Side Short films presented'

- Malaria
- Hungry Hickory
- Carn
- Luna
- Pupa
- Grave Shivers
- Kekasih
- Cold Turkey
- Dji. Death Fails

Awards

- Grand Prize: Carn
- First Runner-up : Kekasih
- Audience Award: Malaria

Festival Jury

- Gregg Hale
- Andrew Bowler
- Chris Harrison
- Meg Humphrey
- Ben Kasulke
- Mark Shapiro
- Tom Tangney
- Gavin Williams

=== 2016 ===
The 16th Annual Science Fiction + Fantasy Short Film Fest took place at the Seattle Cinerama on Saturday, March 19, 2016, with an Encore presentation on Sunday.

Short films presented

- Aden
- Frost
- The Witching Hour
- The Red Thunder
- The Future Perfect
- Goblin Queen
- Palm Rot
- Tristes Déserts (A Robot's Tale)
- The Garden
- La Fille Bionique (Bionic Girl)
- Mis-Drop
- Employee of the Day
- Juliet
- Way Out
- The Brain Hack
- No Look Dunk
- Disco Inferno (dir. Alice Waddington)
- They Will All Die in Space
- Doubles

Awards

- Grand Prize Winner: Aden
- Second Place Winner: Frost
- Third Place Winner: Juliet
- Douglas Trumbull Award for Visual Effects: Aden
