= Jessica Duchen =

Jessica Duchen is a British music writer, novelist, playwright and opera librettist.

== Life ==
Born in London, Duchen was educated at North London Collegiate School and studied music at Jesus College, Cambridge. She was a classical music correspondent for The Independent for 12 years. She has written on music for BBC Music Magazine, The Guardian, Prospect Magazine, The Jewish Chronicle, The Times, iNews, and classical-music.com.

Duchen's Myra Hess: National Treasure (2025) was the first biography of the great pianist to appear in nearly 50 years and was praised as 'magnificent' by The Spectator. Her novel Ghost Variations (2016), based on the true story of the Schumann Violin Concerto's rediscovery in the 1930s, was chosen by John Suchet as his Best Read of 2016 for the Daily Mail 's Christmas Books selection and was book of the month in BBC Music Magazine.

Duchen is also a librettist, collaborating with the composer Roxanna Panufnik. She wrote the libretto for Panufnik's community opera Silver Birch (2017), commissioned by Garsington Opera and shortlisted for an International Opera Award in 2018. Dalia (2022) was another opera composed by Panufnik, inspired by global dialogue between war refugee children and British children.

Duchen lives in London with her husband, who is a violinist.

== Works ==
=== Non-fiction ===
- Erich Wolfgang Korngold. Phaidon Press, 1996.
- Gabriel Faure. Phaidon Press, 2000.
- (with Dorothy Bohm) Inside London. Lund Humphries, 2000.
- London Chamber Orchestra: 101 Years of Transformation. Pimpernel Press, 2022. Foreword by HRH The Duchess of Cornwall.
- Myra Hess: National Treasure. Kahn & Averill, 2025.

=== Novels ===
- Hungarian Dances. Hodder & Stoughton, 2008.
- Songs of Triumphant Love. Hodder & Stoughton, 2009.
- Rites of Spring. Hodder & Stoughton, 2012.
- Alicia's Gift. Hodder & Stoughton, 2012.
- Ghost Variations: The Strangest Detective Story in the History of Music. Unbound Publishing, 2016.
- Odette. Unbound, 2018.
- Immortal. Unbound Publishing, 2020.
