= Cinerama Dome =

Movie theater in Hollywood, California

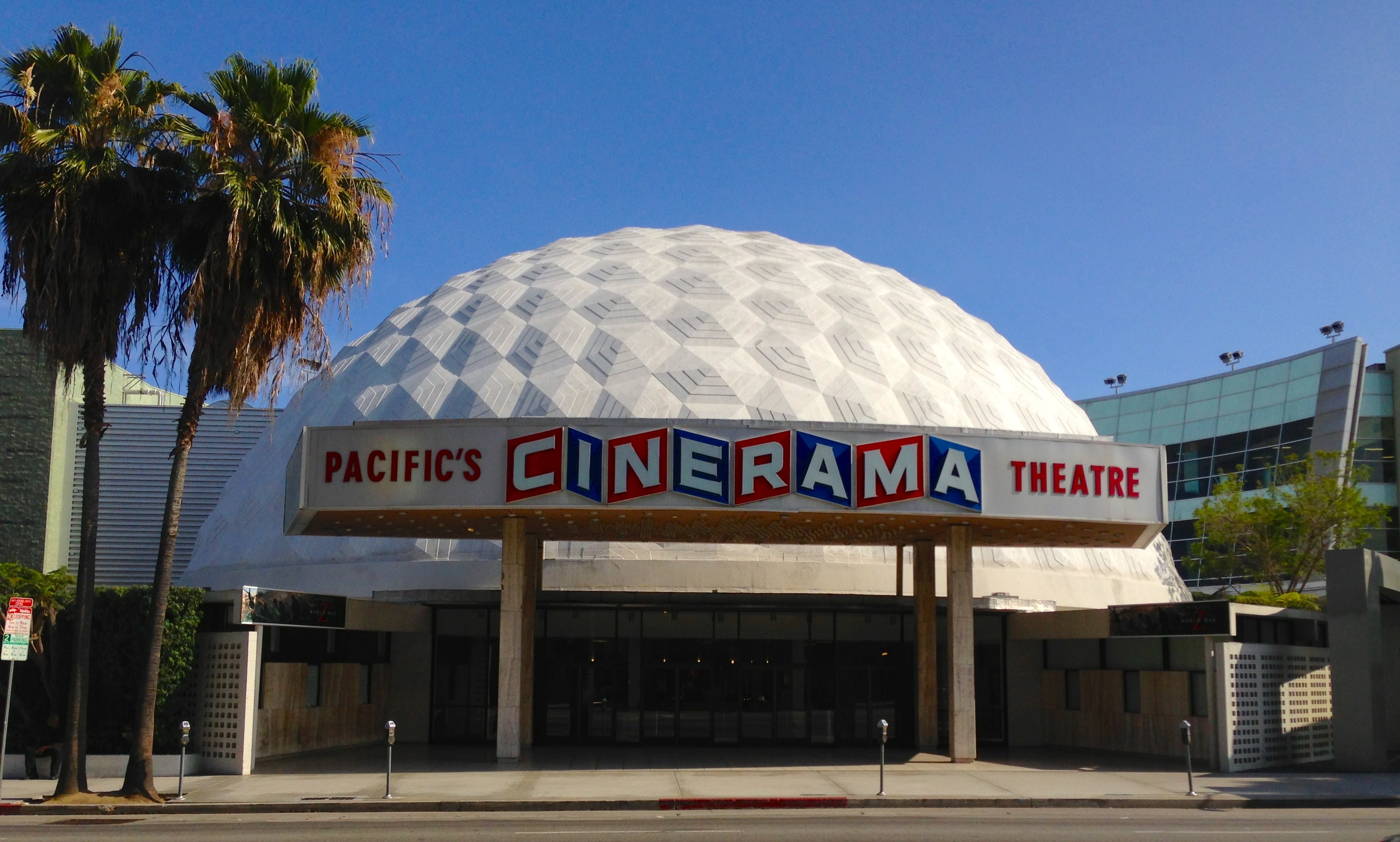
- Interactive map of Cinerama Dome
- Location: 6360 Sunset Boulevard, Hollywood, California
- Coordinates: 34.097581°N 118.328088°W
- Owner: The Decurion Corporation
- Type: Indoor movie theater

Construction
- Opened: November 7, 1963 (Original)
- Closed: April 12, 2021 (Original)
- Reopened: 2028 (Planned)
- Architects: Pierre Cabrol; Welton Becket & Associates
- General contractor: AECOM Hunt

Los Angeles Historic-Cultural Monument
- Designated: December 18, 1998
- Reference no.: 659

The Cinerama Dome is a movie theater on Sunset Boulevard in Hollywood, California that closed in 2020. Designed to exhibit widescreen Cinerama films, it opened November 7, 1963. The original developer was William R. Forman, founder of Pacific Theatres. The Cinerama Dome continued as a leading first-run theater, most recently as part of the ArcLight Hollywood complex, until it closed due to the COVID-19 pandemic in California. The ArcLight chain closed permanently in April 2021, with the theater never having reopened. In June 2022, it was announced that there were plans to reopen under a new name, Cinerama Hollywood. In 2026, Sony Pictures announced that it had purchased the leases to the Cinerama Dome and former ArcLight Hollywood and plans to reopen both locations in 2028, with the former ArcLight as an Alamo Drafthouse Cinema.

== History ==
In February 1963, Cinerama Inc. unveiled a radically new design for theaters that would show its movies. They would be based on the geodesic dome developed by R. Buckminster Fuller, would cost half as much as conventional theaters of comparable size, and could be built in half the time. Cinerama's goal was to see at least 600 built worldwide within two years. The following April, Pacific Theatres Inc. announced plans to build the first theater based upon the design, and had begun razing existing buildings at the construction site. Located on Sunset near Vine Street, it would be the first new major motion-picture theater in Hollywood in 33 years and would be completed in time for the scheduled November 2 press premiere of It's a Mad, Mad, Mad, Mad World. The design was proposed by French architect Pierre Cabrol, lead designer in the noted architectural firm of Welton Becket and Associates. Pierre Cabrol worked with R. Buckminster Fuller during his studies at Massachusetts Institute of Technology (MIT).

Pacific Theatres founder, William R. Forman, announced the construction of the Cinerama Dome in July 1963 at a star-studded, ground-breaking ceremony where Spencer Tracy, Buddy Hackett, Mickey Rooney, Dick Shawn, Edie Adams, and Dorothy Provine donned hard hats, and, with picks and shovels, began construction. Forman had committed to United Artists that the theatre would be ready for the November 7, 1963, world premiere of the first movie filmed in the new 70mm, single-strip Cinerama process, Stanley Kramer's It's a Mad, Mad, Mad, Mad, World. Working around the clock, the entire construction spanned only 16 weeks. The Cinerama Dome is the only concrete geodesic dome in the world. The theatre is made up of 316 individual hexagonal and pentagonal shapes in 16 different sizes. Each of these pieces is approximately 12 feet (3.7 metres) across and weighs around 7,500 pounds (3,400 kilograms). The theatre also has design elements such as a loge section with stadium seating, architecturally significant floating stairways, and, at the time of its opening, the largest contoured motion-picture screen in the world, measuring 32 ft (9.8 m) high and 86 ft (26 m) wide, with a maximum aspect ratio of 2.69:1.

The premiere of It's a Mad, Mad, Mad, Mad World, filmed in Ultra Panavision 70, marked the dawn of "single lens" Cinerama. Previously, Cinerama was known for its groundbreaking three-projector process. From 1963 until 2002, the Cinerama Dome never showed movies with the three-projector process. (The nearby Warner Cinerama at 6433 Hollywood Boulevard used the three-projector process until December 1964.) A unique "rectified" print was made with increased anamorphic compression towards the sides, which compensated for distortions that would otherwise be induced by Cinerama's deeply curved screen.

It's a Mad, Mad, Mad, Mad World played at the Dome for 66 weeks, the longest-running film there. It was shown again to mark the 25th anniversary of the Dome in 1988.

=== 21st century ===
In 2002, after a two-year closure during which three-strip Cinerama was installed for the first time, the Dome reopened as part of Pacific Theatres' ArcLight Hollywood complex. It became one of three remaining three-strip Cinerama theaters in the world, the others being the Pictureville Cinema and the SIFF Cinema Downtown.

The Cinerama Dome made its digital projection debut in May 2005 with Star Wars: Episode III – Revenge of the Sith.

On February 28, 2006 Johnny Cash's original backing band, The Tennessee Three with members W.S. Holland and Bob Wootton played the very first live musical performance at the Cinerama Dome in support of the DVD release of the Cash Biopic Walk the Line.

In 2009, James Cameron's Avatar was the first 3D film to be shown in the Cinerama Dome, using technology from XpanD 3D.

In December 2015, the Cinerama Dome upgraded to a laser-projection system, using two Christie 6P projectors and Dolby 3D. The venue is still capable of both 35mm and 70mm-film projection.

In April 2021, the parent company of Pacific Theatres announced that it would not be reopening any of its locations, including the Cinerama Dome, due to the impact of the COVID-19 pandemic. Later in the year, it was reported that a permit had been filed with provisions for a bar and restaurant.

In June 2022, it was reported that Decurion Corp. had plans to reopen the theater under the name Cinerama Hollywood along with the adjoining fourteen-screen multiplex. There were also plans to include two bars and a restaurant at the location. Three months later, it was reported that the theater would not be reopening until at least the latter part of 2023; in May 2023, it was reported that it was delayed once again to the latter part of 2024. In November 2023, the reopening was again delayed until the second quarter of 2025 due mostly in part to the redesign happening in the space including the addition of restaurants and event space. In April 2025, it was reported the reopening of the Cinerama Dome was uncertain due to the property manager saying it would not reopen that year and that Decurion was unwilling to either sell or reopen the complex. A petition to reopen the complex, organized by activist Benjamin Steinberg, had reached more than 30,000 signatures at the time of the report. When asked about the future of the Cinerama Dome and Arclight Hollywood during a June 2025 public hearing held by the Los Angeles l Office of Zoning Administration, land use consultant Elizabeth Peterson of the Elizabeth Peterson Group said:

The property owner is again Dome Center for LLC Robertson Properties Group. They have reached out to me and have recently started discussing moving forward with the Cinerama Dome. We don't have any plans yet, but I think that they wanted to make sure that they did this in a timely manner. The ownership is very committed to moving forward to continue redeveloping the site. Obviously, the theater would be next. And all I can tell you is that they have reached out to me to discuss that. Their goal is to restore the entire property.

In August 2025, a report from The Hollywood Reporter stated that the reopening of the Cinerama Dome and ArcLight Hollywood remained in limbo. Two months later, Dome Center LLC, the company that owns the property, filed an application for a conditional-use permit to sell alcohol for on-site consumption at the Cinerama Dome Theater and the Arclight Hollywood. However, no timetable for the reopening was given.

In April 2026, police responded to a protest where Steinberg had projected a message demanding the theater be reopened onto the building's surface. After police officers told Steinberg that the Forman family considered his demonstration a form of harassment, Steinberg decided to stop his campaign to avoid potential legal issues. The following month, responding to Steinberg's protest, the owner's representative noted at a public hearing that ownership took notice of the extreme public interest in reopening. An associate zoning administrator added he was "inclined to approve" a conditional use permit for the Cinerama Dome and adjoining ArcLight Hollywood, while the owner's representative indicated the venues would reopen "in the near future."

On July 22, 2026, it was announced that Sony Pictures would resuscitate both the Cinerama Dome and Hollywood Arclight multiplex, with the latter becoming an Alamo Drafthouse Cinema. Once renovations begin in August of that year, both locations are planning to reopen in 2028.

== Preservation ==
With its 86 feet (26 m) wide screen, advanced acoustics and 70mm film capability, the Cinerama Dome remained a favorite for film premieres and "event" showings. But by the late 1990s, the motion picture exhibition business began to favor multiplex cinemas, and Pacific Theatres proposed a plan to remodel the Dome as a part of a shopping mall/cinema complex. Historical preservationists were outraged, not wishing to see another great theater turned into a multiplex or destroyed. At the same time, a small contingent of Cinerama enthusiasts had begun resurrecting the three-projector process. They and the preservationists prevailed upon Pacific to rethink its plans for the property.

The preservation of the Cinerama Dome came at a time when most other surviving Cinerama theaters were being demolished. An example of this was the case of the Indian Hills Theater in Omaha, Nebraska, a round Cinerama theater boasting a 110-foot screen that was razed in 2001 to make room for a parking lot.

The Cinerama Dome was declared a Los Angeles Historic-Cultural Monument in 1998.

Beginning in March 2020 following the pandemic-induced closure of the Cinerama Dome and its adjacent ArcLight Hollywood complex, filmmaker Benjamin Steinberg of the Save Your Cinema campaign launched a grassroots advocacy campaign to pressure the property's owners, the Decurion Corporation, into reopening the historic theater or leasing it to another exhibitor. His efforts included creating a Change.org petition that gathered over 30,000 signatures, building a significant social media following to document the property's condition, and staging a high-profile projection protest on the building in April 2026. Shortly after the protest, facing pressure from the owners and advice to avoid potential legal conflicts, Steinberg officially paused his active campaign.

== See also ==
- List of Los Angeles Historic-Cultural Monuments in Hollywood
- Seattle Cinerama
- Pictureville Cinema
