= Amanda Nevill =

British arts administrator (born 1957)

Amanda Nevill CBE, FRSA
- Born: Amanda Elizabeth Nevill; 21 March 1957 (age 69)
- Occupation: Arts administrator

Amanda Elizabeth Nevill (born 21 March 1957) is a British arts administrator who is the former Chief Executive of the British Film Institute.

== Early life and education ==
Nevill was born on 21 March 1957. She was educated in Yorkshire and Paris.

== Career ==
Her first job, in 1976, was for the Rowan Gallery in London. She set up the first British contemporary art fair at Bath in 1980 and subsequently organised a touring exhibition for Kodak.

Nevill joined the Royal Photographic Society in 1985 became its National Centre of Photography Administrator in late 1985. Nevill became the Society's Secretary in 1990 (later renamed Director-General), the first woman to hold the post.

Nevill was appointed as Head of Museum at the National Museum of Photography, Film and Television (now the National Science and Media Museum) in Bradford during the spring of 1994. During her tenure, the Museum carried out a £16 million re-development and launched the Bradford International Film Festival.

=== British Film Institute ===
Nevill joined the British Film Institute (BFI) as the organisation's Director in June 2003 (her job title changed to Chief Executive in 2011, after the BFI takeover of the UK Film Council). According to her citation at an honorary degree award she has led its complete transformation into a major organisation valued by the UK industry and recognised as influential internationally. She pioneered the development of the VOD platform BFI Player, launched the BFI Film Academy and BFI Film Audience Network across the UK, transformed BFI Southbank into one of London's coolest arts venues and ensured the BFI London Film Festival is one of the most significant film festivals in the world. She remained as CEO until 2020.

== Honours ==
- 1993, Honorary Fellowship of the Royal Photographic Society.
- Fellow of the Royal Society of Arts
- Council Member of the University of Bradford
- 2000, Honorary Doctorate of Letters from the University of Bradford, conferred July 2000
- Director of the Urban Regeneration Company, Bradford (resigned 2004)
- 2003, Colin Ford Award from the Royal Photographic Society
- 2015, awarded an honorary degree by the University of York for her contribution to society
- 2015, appointed Commander of the Order of the British Empire (CBE) in the Queen's Birthday Honours "for services to the Film Industry".
