= Pictureville Cinema =

Cinema auditorium in Bradford, England

Coordinates: 53.791°N 1.757°W

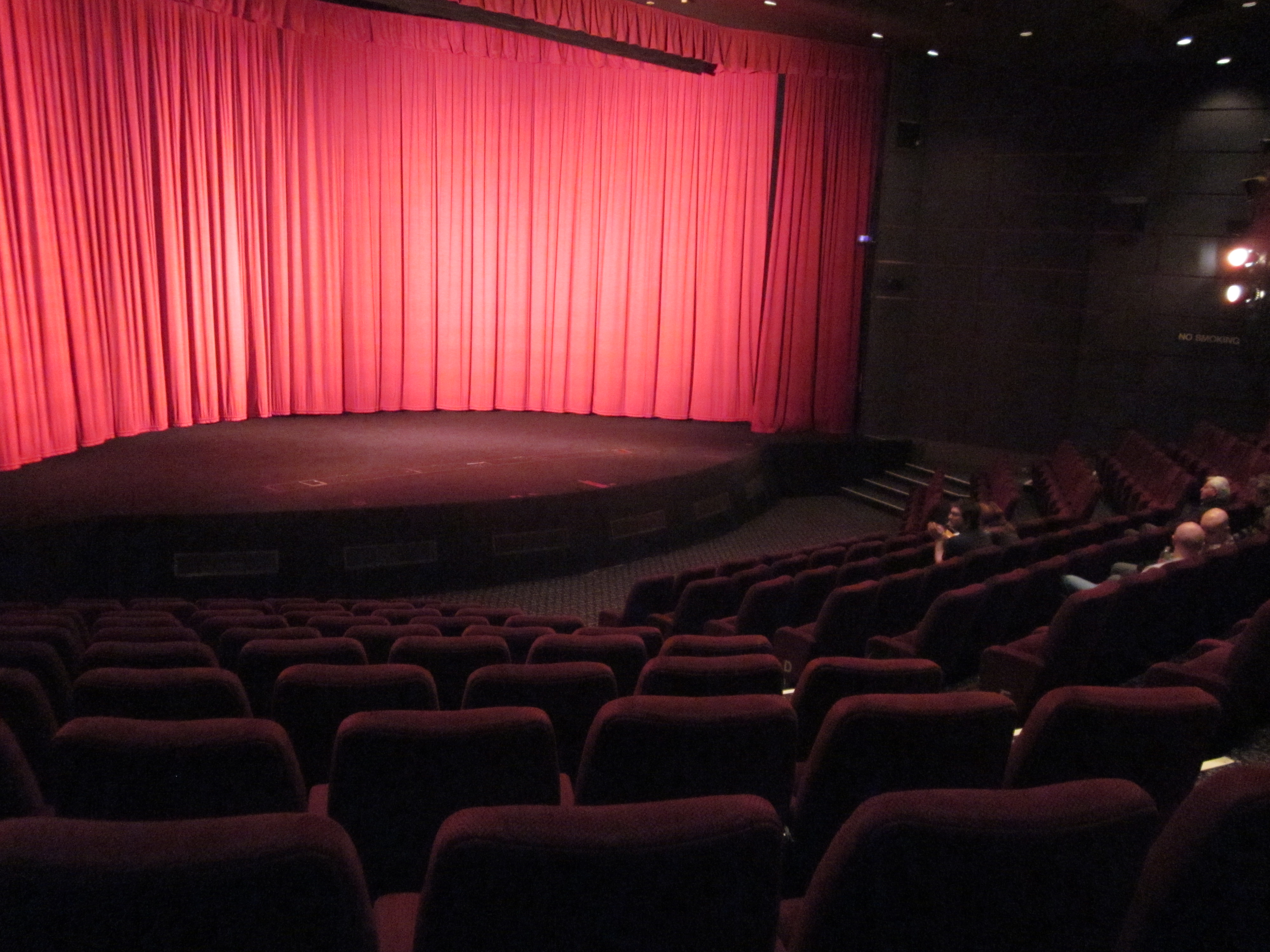
The interior, ready for showing a Cinerama film on the curved screen

Pictureville Cinema is a cinema auditorium located within the National Science and Media Museum in Bradford, West Yorkshire, England. The building was originally the Theatre for Bradford Central Library which opened in 1967.

Pictureville is one of the best equipped cinemas in the world. It is equipped for 35 mm, 70 mm, 4K resolution and Cinerama projection. The cinema features Dolby Digital EX, DTS and 8 Channel SDDS digital sound systems. It has the only public Cinerama projection system outside the USA.

The cinema opened on 8 April 1992, with a charity performance of Hook in 70 mm and 6-channel stereophonic sound. The first Cinerama screening was This is Cinerama on 16 June 1993.

== See also ==
- Cinerama Dome
- Seattle Cinerama
