= Neeta Madahar =

British artist (born 1966)

- Born: 1966 (age 59–60); London, England
- Occupation: Photographer

Neeta Madahar (born 1966) is a British artist who specialises in photography of nature, birds, and flora. She has had solo exhibitions in Canada, Barcelona, Berlin, Boston, France, London, and New York and had a book, Flora, published by Nazraeli Press. She was named as one of the UK's 50 most significant contemporary photographers in an issue of Portfolio Magazine.

Some of her well appreciated series of photographs are "Sustenance" (2003), "Flora" on flowers "as props for the subjects who are her female friends", "Falling" (2005) of the sky, and "Cosmoses" (2005–07) comprising pictures of flowers shown like stars falling from the sky.

== Biography ==
Madahar was born in 1966 in London. She has a Hindu background, and is a British national. In her initial years she evinced keen interest in photography. Though discouraged by her parents, she pursued her passion for photography by attending painting and drawing classes in the evenings. Her first degree was in mathematics, a tradition in her family. Her further education started with a degree from the Winchester School of Art in 1999 with specific interest in videography. She then continued her studies at the University of Southampton in England and received a BA Honors degree in Fine Art. In 2003, she graduated from the School of the Museum of Fine Arts, Boston and Tufts University, Boston with a Master of Fine Arts (MFA) degree in Studio Art; this study was facilitated by a scholarship.

The subject matter of her MFA degree related to a series titled "Sustenance" which brought her accolades. In this series, Madahar has six pictures of birds taken in identical composition of a red-and-clear plastic bird feeder atop a tree which attracts a number of birds. The photographs were taken in a complicated technique, from a camouflaged location, over a period of 18 months by using a large format camera. Another set of photographs of the sky is titled "Solstice," taken on 21 June, the longest day of the year, and exhibited in June 2007.

Madahar has presented her photographs in solo exhibitions at Les Rencontres-Arles Photography Festival in France in 2004, at the Institute of International Visual Arts (InIVA), London in 2005, at Purdy Hicks Gallery, London, at Howard Yezerski Gallery, Boston, Danforth Museum of Art, Massachusetts during 2006, and in 2007 at the Oakville Galleries, Ontario, Canada.

In 2008, having received a 2008–09 Bradford Fellowship in Photography from the National Media Museum in Bradford, UK, she presented solo exhibitions from October 2009 to February 2010. A monograph based on a series of photographic portraits titled "Flora", which comprise 17 photographs of her women friends, has been released by Nazraeli Press. The theme of "Flora" is the close link that exists in "nature, artifice and perception". These represent the style in vogue during 1930-1950s set to the present scenario. The photographs bring out "an extreme, stylized form of femininity alongside associations between fantasy and female beauty." On "Flora", Madahar says "There has been no digital retouching of the images. With this series I felt that I needed to delineate my relationship to photographic ‘truth’ and I chose to stay within the confines of what is feasible following a non-digital process. I wanted to see what regular, mature women look like and how skin, muscle and fat appears when restricting oneself to the benefits of hair and make-up products, the flattery of clothes, controlled studio lighting and the image manipulations, such as dodging and burning, that can be executed in an analogue darkroom."

Currently she is organizing exhibitions, projects on animation, self-portraiture, art and commercial photography, and a project related to her Hindu parentage.

== Publications ==
- Flora. Portland, OR: Nazraeli Press, 2011. ISBN 978-159005-250-1.

== Public collections ==
Madahar's work is held in the following public collection:

- University of Warwick, Coventry, England, holds "Sustenance 51"
