= Raymond Ray-Jones =

English painter (1886–1942)

- Born: Raymond Jones; 31 August 1886; Ashton-under-Lyne, Lancashire, UK
- Died: 26 February 1942 (aged 55); Carbis Bay, St Ives, Cornwall, UK
- Occupation: Painter-etcher
- Known for: Draughtsmanship
- Spouse: Effie Pearce

Raymond Ray-Jones (31 August 1886 in Ashton-under-Lyne, Lancashire – 26 February 1942 in Carbis Bay near St Ives, Cornwall) was an English painter and etcher.

== Life and career ==
Born Raymond Jones, he was the eldest son and second child of Samuel Shepley Jones, a cabinet maker, and his wife Martha Hulme.

Leaving St Ann’s school in Ashton at the age of fourteen, Ray-Jones worked first at the National Gas & Oil Co. Ltd., and studied part-time at Ashton's Heginbottom School of Art under J.H. Cronshaw. He showed enough talent to gain a county scholarship and a place at the Royal College of Art in Kensington, London in 1907 – a considerable achievement in those days. At the R.C.A. he studied under Prof Gerald Moira and Sir Frank Short RA, P.R.E., and from May 1911 attended the studio of Jean-Paul Laurens, known as Académie Julian, in Paris, where he was awarded the Grand Prix and Medal for portrait painting.

In 1913, on the advice of his tutors, he changed his name to Raymond Ray-Jones, and by 1914 established a studio at Joubert Studios, 14 Jubilee Place, London SW3, off the King's Road. He became an Associate of the Royal Society of Painter-Etchers and Engravers on 17 March 1914 (now the Royal Society of Painter-Printmakers). Ray-Jones served during the First World War (1914–18) as a clerk or ostler in the Royal Horse Artillery at Woolwich. This was followed by a period of penury in Jubilee Place.

Through Frank Short, his talent came to the notice of Edward Holroyd Pearce (later Lord Pearce), who was then an undergraduate at Oxford University.

Ray-Jones was an early member of the Society of Graphic Art (now the Society of Graphic Fine Art). He married Pearce’s sister, Effie Irene Pearce, on 12 February 1926, and they lived at Woodham Walter in Essex. in 1926 he was made a Fellow of the Royal Society of Painter-Etchers.

Ray-Jones was an etcher and a meticulous draughtsman. Buildings were his main subject, though he also did portraiture and worked in chalk, oil, and watercolour. The demand for etchings that had been good, began to collapse at about the time of his marriage. Ray-Jones had little sympathy with the work of modern artists such as Picasso. Ray-Jones was so concerned with detail and accuracy that his body of work was small.

After the birth of Alan in 1931, Ray-Jones and his wife moved to Carbis Bay outside St Ives in Cornwall, where they had two more children – Philip in 1933 and in 1941 Anthony (Tony Ray-Jones), who was later to become well known as a professional photographer.

He was a member of the St Ives Society of Artists from 1935–1937, together with artists such as Stanley Spencer, Laura Knight and Frank Brangwyn. Creating a Splash, which records the society at that time, includes a full page reproduction of the self-portrait. In February 2017 a more complete biography of Raymond was published as The Siren, Issue No 12, February 2017 (Special Raymond Ray-Jones Issue), also by David Tovey.

The outbreak of the Second World War in 1939 cut him off from the two countries – France and Italy – that had been the main source of inspiration for his etchings and paintings. This enforced separation, combined with financial worries, led to depression, and he committed suicide at Carbis Bay in 1942.

He was buried in the old churchyard at Lelant Church on 2 March 1942 in an unmarked unrecorded grave due to suicide.

According to the memorial to him on the Tameside website he is best known for his self-portrait The Velvet Hat, which he etched probably c.1910. When exhibited at ‘Modern Masters of Etching’ at the Leicester Galeries in London in 1923 it received great critical acclaim.

So far as is known, no complete catalogue exists of his etchings, paintings, and drawings, but they come on to the market occasionally, and are highly sought.

== Exhibitions and museums ==
Works by Raymond Ray-Jones have been acquired by the British Museum; the Victoria and Albert Museum, South Kensington; Trinity College, Cambridge; Ashmolean Museum, Oxford; Contemporary Art Society; City Art Gallery, Manchester; Mappin Art Gallery, Sheffield; Ipswich Art Gallery, etc.

Prints of the self-portrait are held by the National Portrait Gallery, the British Museum, and the Victoria and Albert Museum.

He exhibited at the Royal Academy, the Royal Society of Painter-Etchers, the Society of Graphic Art; New English Art Club, Bristol, Liverpool etc.; and at International and other exhibitions abroad:– in Paris, Venice, Hamburg, Dresden, Zurich, Geneva, Toronto, Sydney, Dunedin etc.

British Council: Contemporary British Prints and Drawings from the Wakefield Collection.

A retrospective exhibition was held at the Astley Cheetham Art Gallery from 2 May – 3 June 1992. Later still, from 19 February – 27 March 1996, a 'father and son' exhibition was held there for Raymond and Tony Ray-Jones.

The most comprehensive collection of his work was donated by his eldest son Alan Ray-Jones in 2016 under the Cultural Gifts Scheme administered by the Arts Council England, and is held by the Whitworth Art Gallery in Manchester, not far from his birthplace in Ashton-under-Lyne.
