= National Science and Media Museum =

Part of the National Science Museum Group in the UK

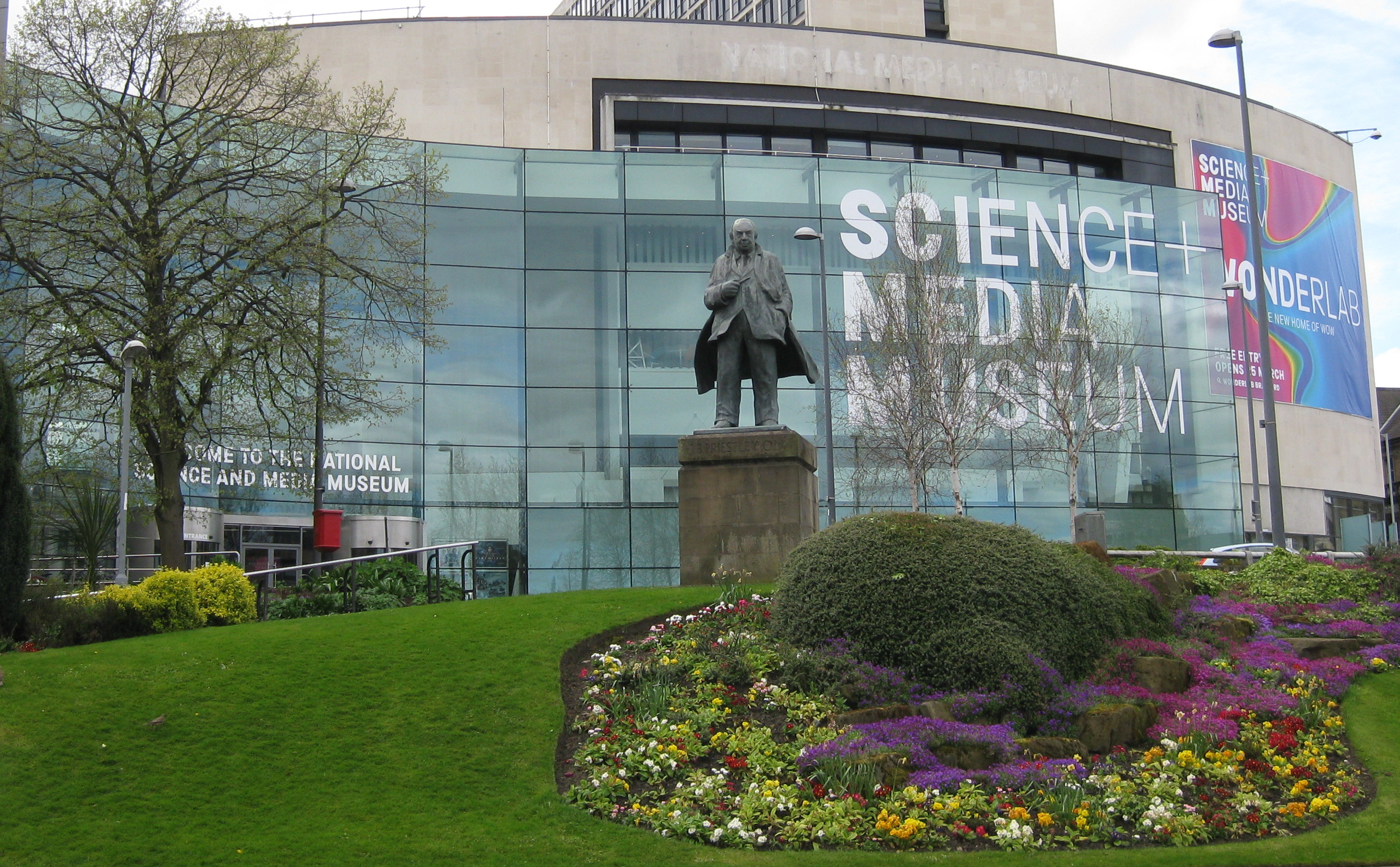
- National Science and Media Museum with statue of J. B. Priestley
- Former name: National Media Museum; National Museum of Photography, Film and Television
- Established: 16 June 1983
- Location: Bradford, West Yorkshire, England
- Coordinates: 53.790556°N 1.755556°W
- Collections: National Photography Collection, National Cinematography Collection, National Television Collection, National New Media Collection
- Collection size: 3.5 million items
- Visitors: 439,916 (2019)
- Director: Jo Quinton-Tulloch
- Curator: Charlotte Connelly
- Website: scienceandmediamuseum.org.uk nationalmediamuseum.org.uk (archived) nmpft.org.uk (archived)

Science Museum Group
- National Railway Museum; Locomotion Museum; Science & Media; Science & Industry; Science Museum; Dana Research Centre and Library; National Collections Centre

The National Science and Media Museum (formerly The National Museum of Photography, Film & Television, 1983–2006 and then the National Media Museum, 2006–2017), located in Bradford, West Yorkshire, is part of the national Science Museum Group in the UK. The museum has seven floors of galleries with permanent exhibitions focusing on photography, television, animation, videogaming, the Internet and the scientific principles behind light and colour. It also hosts temporary exhibitions and maintains a collection of 3.5 million pieces in its research facility.

The venue has three cinemas, including Europe's first opened IMAX screen, finished in April 1983. It hosts festivals dedicated to widescreen film, video games and science. It has hosted popular film festivals, including the Bradford International Film Festival, until 2014.

In September 2011 the museum was voted the best indoor attraction in Yorkshire by the public, and it is one of the most visited museums in the north of England. As of February 2016 the museum, in response to revenue shortfalls, has controversially adopted a policy of focusing on "the science and culture of light and sound"—to the exclusion of what are seen as "unsustainable" aspects of creativity and culture, such as past film festivals.

In March 2016 a £7.5 million five year investment plan in the museum was revealed by the Science Museum Group. In March 2017 its name was changed from National Media Museum to National Science and Media Museum.

In July 2023, the museum closed temporarily as part of a project to construct two new galleries. As of 16 January 2025 the museum has since reopened to visitors.

== Building and admission ==
Entrance is free, with the exception of cinema screens. The museum is open 10 am until 6 pm every day. The museum underwent a £16 million refurbishment in 1998, developing a new digital technology gallery. This new development created a new glass-fronted atrium, which houses a new café and shop.

=== Galleries ===
There are six permanent exhibitions:

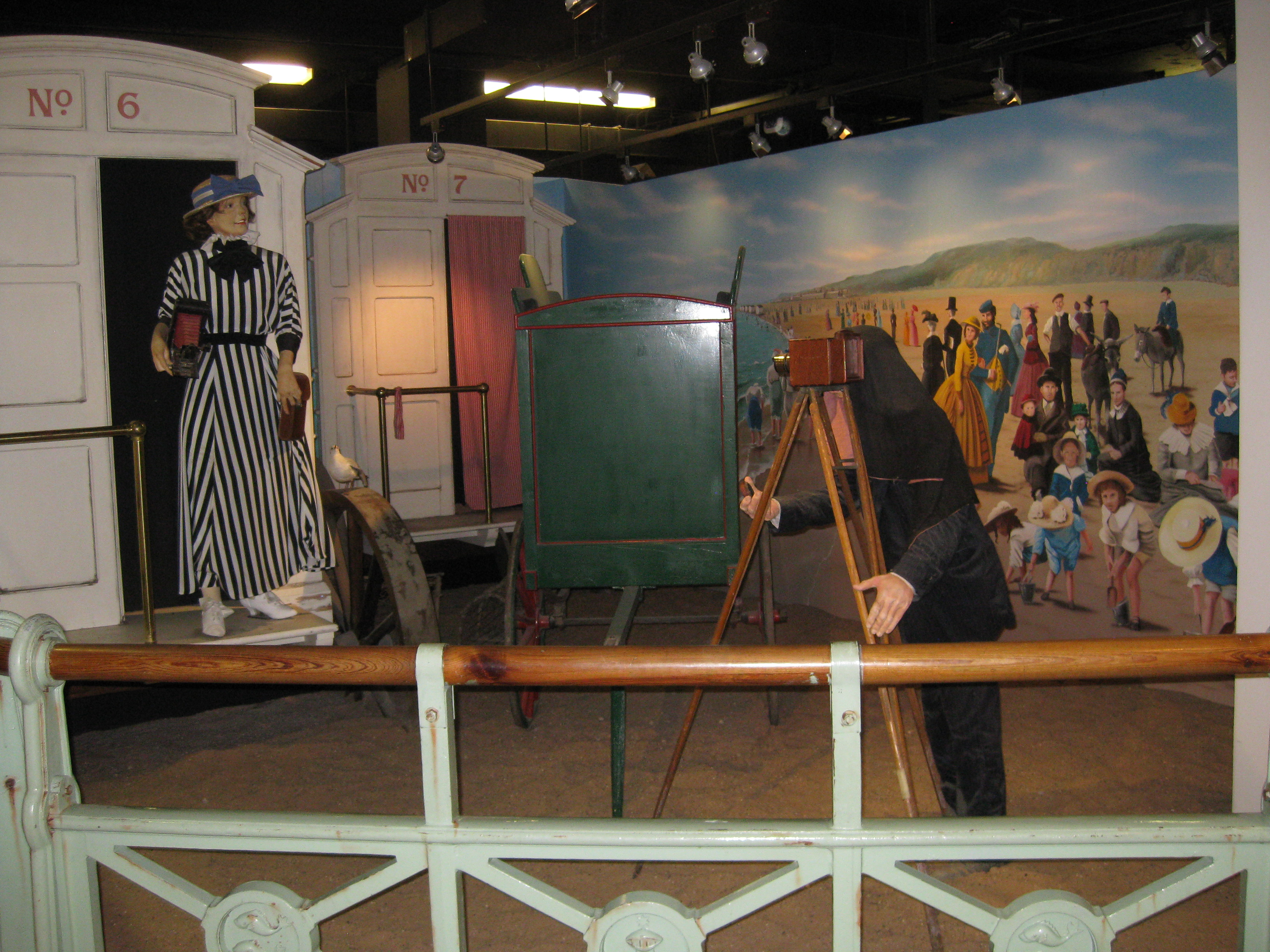
Tableau in the Kodak Gallery

- Kodak Gallery – The Kodak Gallery takes the viewer on a journey through the history of popular photography, from the world's first photographs to the digital snapshots of today. Most of the items on display in the gallery are taken from the museum collection of 35,000 objects and images donated by Kodak.
- Wonderlab – Explores light and sound through interactive exhibits and live experiments. Opened in 2016, replacing the Experience TV gallery.
- Power Up – Playable classic games in their original arcade or console formats; the history of video gaming; the story behind this global phenomenon.
- Sound and Vision – new galleries exploring the history of sound and vision technologies. Opened in 2025.

=== Cinemas ===
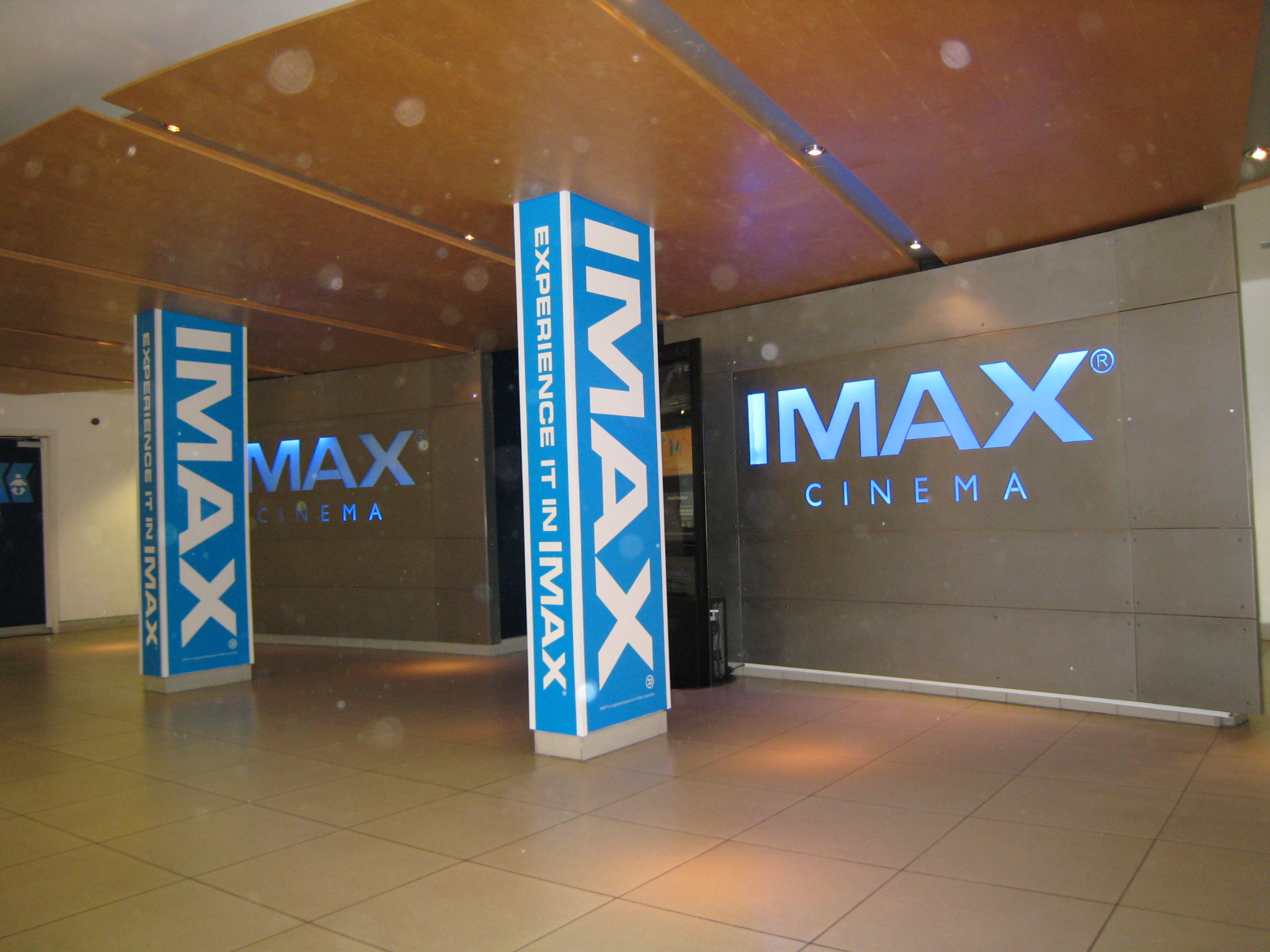
Entrance to the IMAX cinema

The museum incorporates the first permanent UK installation of an IMAX cinema (with a second screen opening in the UK 15 years later). Opened in 1983 as part of the Bradford Film Festival with the projector visible from a darkened booth of the 4th floor. Films included IMAX prints of Apollo 13, The Lion King, Harry Potter and the Goblet of Fire and Batman Begins. In 1999, IMAX upgraded the system and began releasing IMAX 3D presentations. In 2015 it was changed to digital projection instead of film. As a result, the IMAX projection booth is no longer visible.

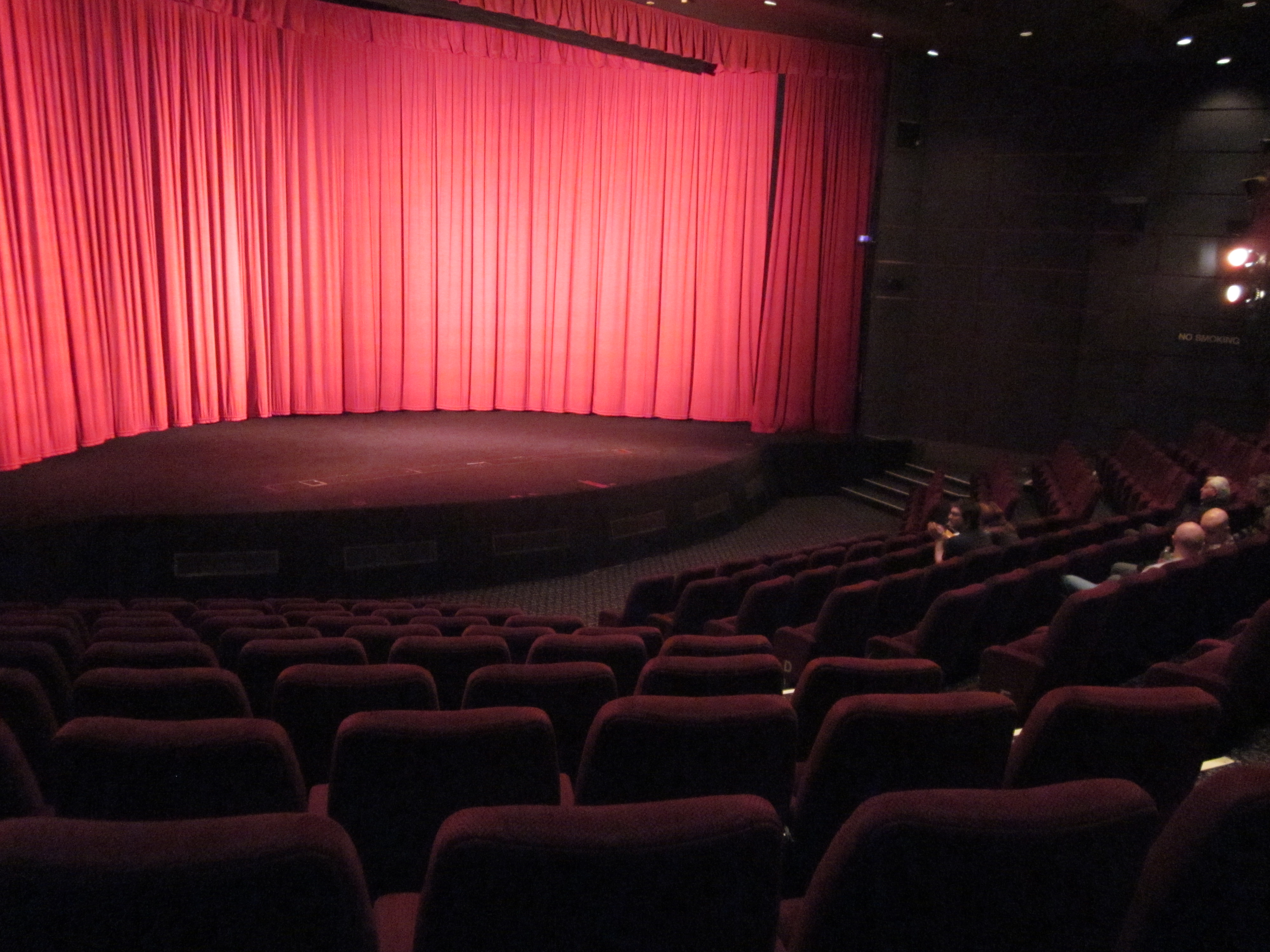
Pictureville Cinema showing curved wide screen

The museum also incorporates the Pictureville Cinema – opened in 1992 and described by David Puttnam as 'the best cinema in the world', Pictureville Cinema screens everything from 70 mm to video; from Hollywood to Bollywood; from silents to digital sound, with certifications in presentation including THX in sound and picture and the Dolby EX system. In 2008, the cinema presented the only true recorded public screening of Danny Boyle's 2002 film Alien Love Triangle.

Pictureville Cinema is one of only three public cinemas in the world permanently equipped to display original 3-strip 35mm Cinerama prints, and is the only public Cinerama venue in the UK. Cinerama films are screened at the annual Widescreen Weekend film festival.

The Cubby Broccoli Cinema (in memory of the producer of James Bond films), contains 106 seats and is used for a variety of film shows. In 2012, it was one of three venues in the UK to screen the Olympic Opening Ceremony in Super Hi-Vision.

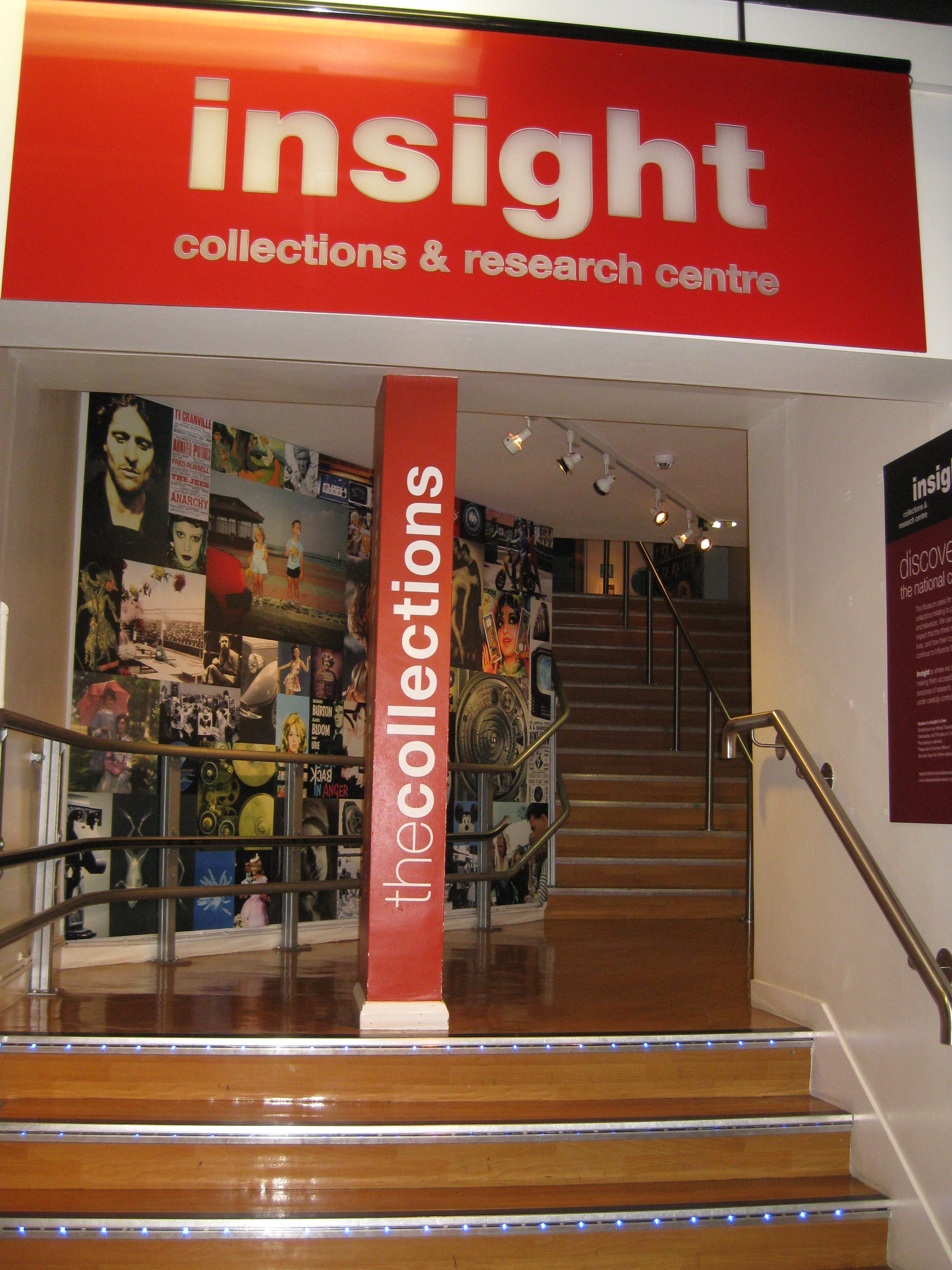
Insight entrance

=== Insight ===
Insight is a facility where members of the public can (by prior booking) view parts of the collections which are not on general display.

== Collection ==
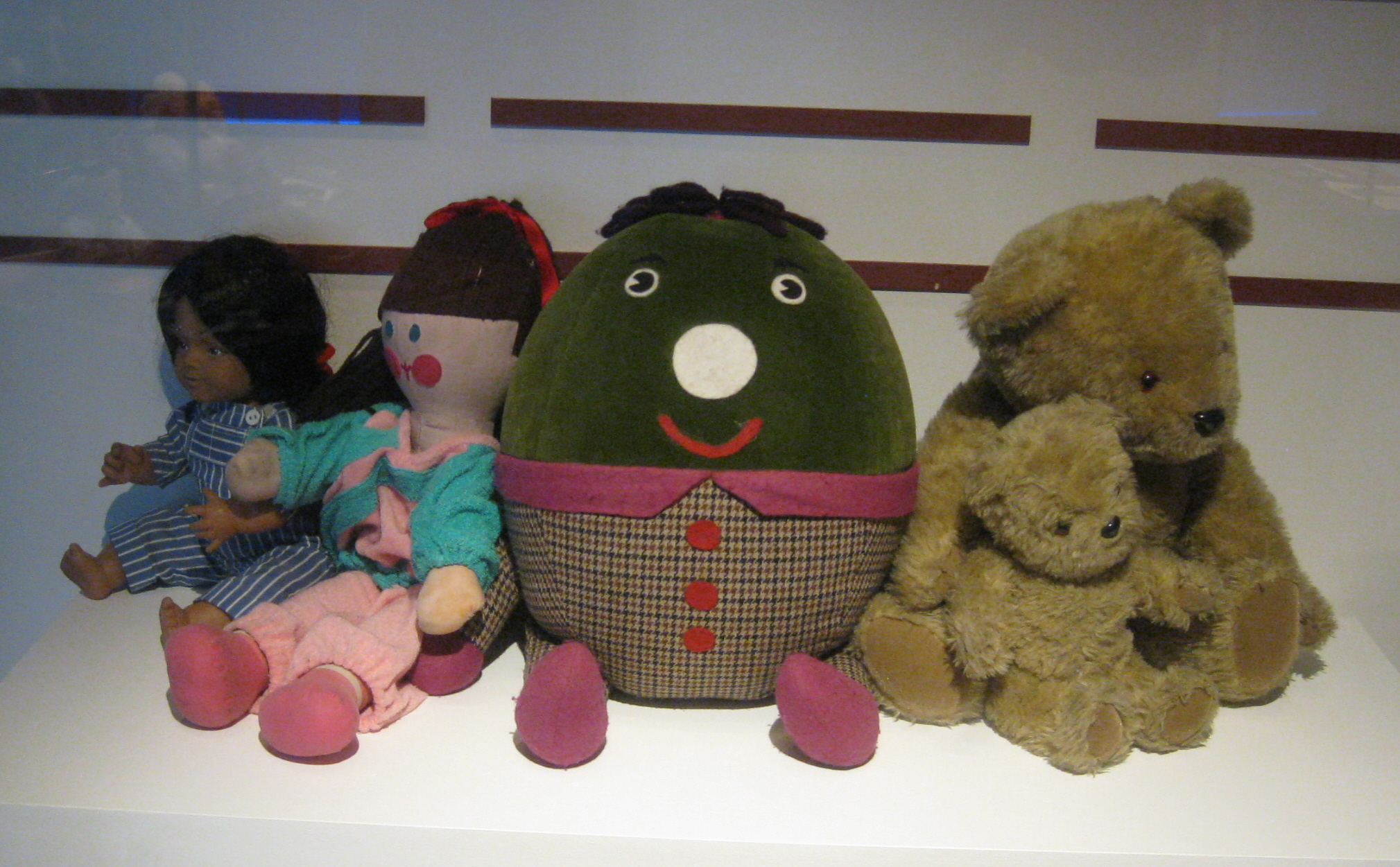
Playschool toys

The museum's collection contains 3.5 million items of historical, cultural and social value. Notable objects and archives include:

- The first photographic negative
- The earliest television footage
- The world's first colour moving pictures
- Louis Le Prince's 1888 films Roundhay Garden Scene and Traffic Crossing Leeds Bridge
- A collection of 35,000 objects and images donated by Kodak Ltd.
- A collection of around 1,000 historical objects from the BBC
- The photographic archive of the Daily Herald, comprising millions of images
- The photographic archive of Tony Ray-Jones
- Original toys from the BBC series Play School – the first programme on BBC2
- Objects and designs used in the making of Hammer horror films

The collections are accessible to the public through the museum's Insight study centre.

The collection of the Royal Photographic Society was transferred to the Museum on behalf of the nation in 2003. As of 2017, most of the collection is moving to the Victoria and Albert museum in London. The National Science and Media Museum "will retain collections that help explore the development of photographic processes, such as the Kodak collection; the cultural impact of photography, such as the Daily Herald archive; and archives that have a direct relevance to Bradford."

== History ==
=== National Museum of Photography, Film and Television ===
The museum (throughout its name changes and to the present) occupies a site originally proposed for a theatre in central Bradford, for which work had been begun in the 1960s but which remained unfinished. Discussions and a decision between Dame Margaret Weston of the Science Museum, London, and Bradford's city councillors led to the establishment of the National Museum of Photography, Film and Television, as it was then called, which was opened on 16 June 1983.

Local funding for architectural work complemented the Science Museum's funding to convert the building to its new use, with the bars and dressing rooms of the original theatre layout being converted to galleries, and with the conflicting demands of a theatre building occupying multiple storeys and a museum that would ideally reside on a single level needing to be accommodated. The museum's centrepiece was its auditorium with IMAX cinema, and its opening launched "the largest cinema screen in Britain": the IMAX screen was five storeys high with six-channel sound. During this period the museum specialised in the art and science of images and image-making. Colin Ford, its first director, believed that understanding how images are made led to better appreciation of the ideas expressed, the intentions and skills of the image-makers.

In 1986, to mark the 50th anniversary of the first public television service, two interactive television galleries were developed. These allowed visitors to directly operate cameras on a studio set with programmed sound and lighting, use vision mixers, read news items from an autocue and discover how chroma keying works. In 1989, to celebrate the 150th anniversary of photography, the museum launched the Kodak Gallery, a display of the history of photography from its invention to the present. This was followed by the installation of a standard television studio, first used by TV-am for outside broadcasts and, later, Nickelodeon. These studios were the first live broadcasting studios in a museum.

While continuing to run the Pictureville Cinema and exhibitions in a temporary venue on the other side of the city, the museum closed its main site on 31 August 1997 to allow for a 19-month, £16 million redevelopment, making the museum 25% bigger. The IMAX cinema was also developed to show 3D films. The new museum was opened on 16 June 1999 by Pierce Brosnan.

=== National Media Museum ===
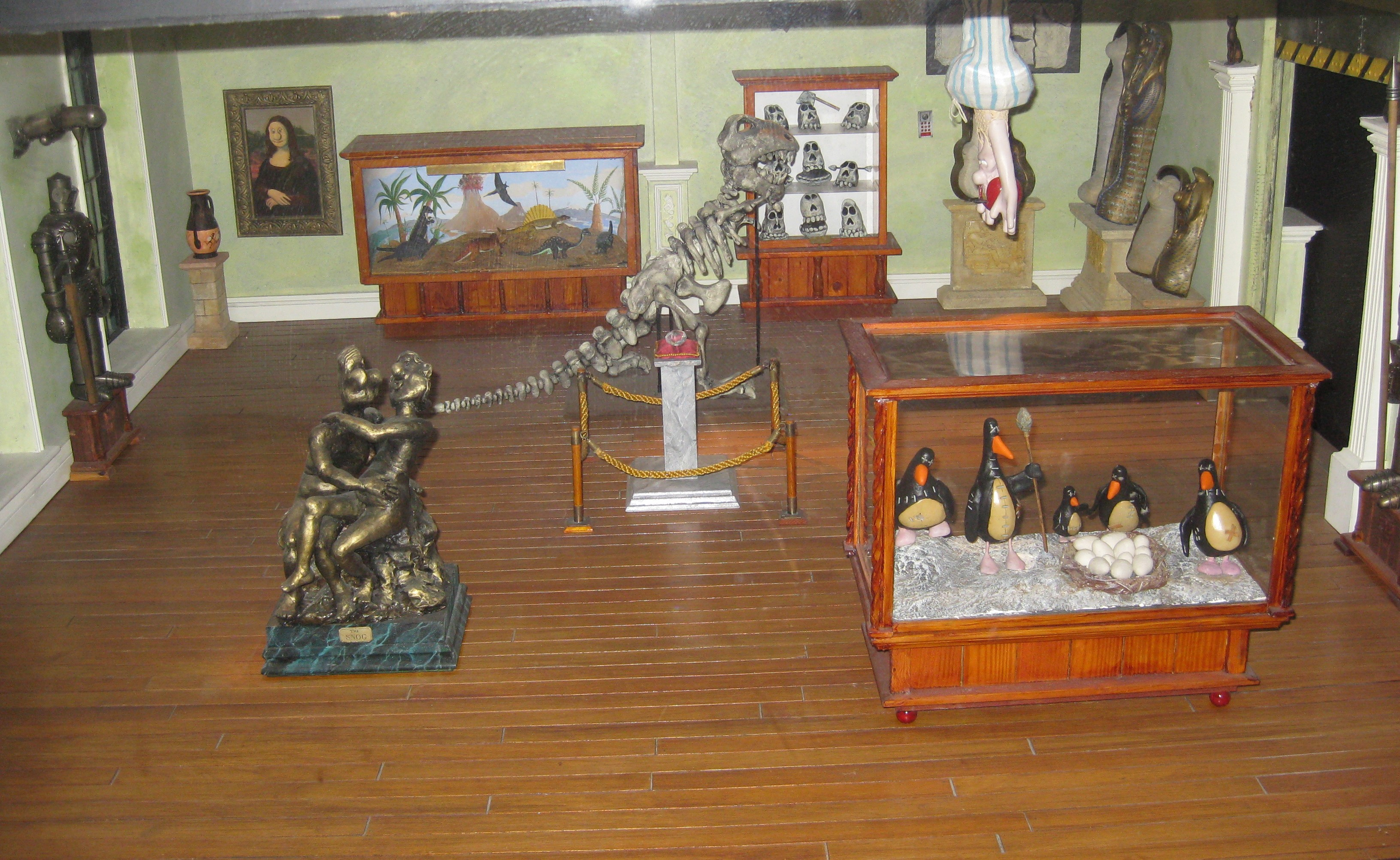
Wallace & Gromit film set: The Wrong Trousers

On 1 December 2006, the museum was renamed the National Media Museum, and two new £3 million interactive galleries were opened: Experience TV, now replaced by Wonderlab, and TV Heaven, now the BFI Mediatheque. The interactive galleries were intended to represent the past, present and future of television and displayed scientific exhibits, such as television inventor John Logie Baird's original apparatus, and television ephemera such as one of the only surviving Wallace and Gromit film sets and Play School toys. TV Heaven was a unique viewing facility where visitors could access an archive of more than 1000 programmes covering sixty years of British television history. TV Heaven closed in 2013, but 50 titles are still available via the BFI Mediatheque.

In 2009 the museum partnered with other bodies from the Bradford district in a successful bid to become the world's first UNESCO (United Nations Educational, Scientific and Cultural Organisation) City of Film.

In February 2010, the museum unveiled a major revamp of the foyer. The remodeling included a brand new Games Lounge, a new gallery that drew on the National Videogame Archive established in 2008 in partnership with Nottingham Trent University. It was originally intended to be temporary, but one in five visitors to the Games Lounge named it as their favourite part of the museum, resulting in the creation of a permanent version in another part of the museum.

In March 2012 the museum opened Life Online, the world's first gallery dedicated to exploring the social, technological and cultural impact of the Internet. The permanent gallery was initially accompanied by a temporary exhibition, "[open source]: Is the internet you know under threat?" The exhibition was an exploration of the open source nature of the Internet, and the current threats to both net neutrality and the general continuation of the open source culture.

In October 2014 the museum entered into a partnership with Picturehouse Cinemas, with the national chain taking over the running of the three cinema screens in a bid to boost audience figures and revenue. The partnership was designated "Picturehouse at the National Media Museum". Despite sustained growth in ticket sales, the museum cancelled its participation in the 2015 Bradford International Film Festival and followed up by totally withdrawing from the festival the following year. This move, together with the 2016 transfer of a major photographic collection to London's Victoria and Albert Museum was very controversial.

In August 2016, the museum confirmed plans to permanently close their Experience TV gallery, after ten years, on 30 August 2016. A new gallery would open in the spring of 2017, called Wonderlab, which allows visitors to explore the sciences of light and sound in interactive exhibits. The television collection previously on display in Experience TV were made available for viewing through the Insight Centre at the museum.

=== National Science and Media Museum ===
In March 2017, the museum opened its £1.8 million interactive gallery Wonderlab. It also announced the second change of its name, to the National Science and Media Museum. Wonderlab is based on the principles of light and sound; attractions include a mirror maze, a 15-metre echo tube and a musical laser tunnel, as well as the world's first permanent 3D-printed zoetrope.

On 7 August 2017, The Magic Factory, a permanent interactive exhibition that lets visitors "get hands-on with light, lenses and mirror trickery to discover the science behind how we see the world around us" closed. According to the museum, its space on Level 4 was refurbished as its new activity and picnic area, Makespace. Amongst the exhibits were a camera obscura, and pinhole camera providing views over Bradford city centre.

In September 2017, Soyuz TMA-19M – the space capsule that brought British astronaut Tim Peake back to Earth after his months-long stint on the International Space Station – was displayed at the museum. This was the first time the capsule had been displayed outside London.

In April 2018 the museum reported 505,000 visits in the 2017/18 financial year, a 25% increase on the previous year and the highest number since 2009.

In September 2019 the museum announced the end of its partnership with Picturehouse Cinemas and its return to an independent cinema operation. The operation was officially launched on 1 November 2019 under the name Pictureville.

On 5 June 2023, the museum temporarily closed for a major refurbishment. Life Online was closed for improvements to access and an enhanced foyer. The TV Gallery and Animation Gallery were closed for redevelopment as the new Sound and Vision Galleries. The museum partially reopened in January 2025, and the new Sound and Vision galleries opened in early July 2025, completing the redevelopment.

== Past exhibitions ==
- Ooh La La! Martin Parr, 1998
- Donovan Wylie: Losing Ground, 1998
- Young Meteors: British Photojournalism 1957–1965, 1998
- ReVisions: An Alternative History of Photography, 1999
- New Natural History, 1999
- Birth of the Cool: David Bailey, 1999–2000
- FutureWorld, 2000
- A Collector's Choice, 2000
- Specimens and Marvels: The Work of William Henry Fox Talbot, 2000
- NOISEGATE by Granular Synthesis, 2000
- The Art of Star Wars, 2000–2001
- In a Lonely Place, 2001
- Symptomatic: Recent Works by Perry Hoberman, 2001
- Paul Strand: Tir a'Mhurain, 2001–2002
- Bond, James Bond, 2002
- Martin Parr: Photographic Works 1971–2000, 2002–2003
- Unknown Pleasures: Unwrapping the Royal Photographic Society Collection, 2003
- Fabula, 2003
- Julia Margaret Cameron: 19th Century Photographer of Genius, 2003
- GENUS, 2003–2004
- A Matter of Focus: The Art of Photography 1892–1917, 2003–2004
- Luc Delahaye: History and Winterreise, 2004
- Simone Nieweg: Landscapes and Gardens, 2004
- Everything's Gone Green: Photography and the Garden, 2004
- Faking It: Between Art Photography and Advertising, 2004
- A Gentle Madness: The Photographs of Tony Ray-Jones (1941–1972), 2004–2005
- The Other Side of Football: Hans van der Meer, 2005
- Forget Me Not: Photography and Remembrance, 2005
- Fashination, 2005
- Lifetimes: Portrait Projects by Julian Germain, 2005–2006
- Raghubir Singh: From One World to Another, 2005–2006
- Mark Power: A System of Edges, 2006
- Elliot Erwitt: A Retrospective, 2006
- A Tale of Two Cities, 2006
- Myths and Visions: The Art of Ray Harryhausen, 2006
- The British Landscape: Photographs by John Davies, 2006–2007
- The Old Order and the New: P.H. Emerson and Photography (1885–1895), 2006–2007
- Paul Seawright: Field Notes, 2007
- An-My Lê: Small Wars, 2007
- The Dawn of Colour: Celebrating the Centenary of the Autochrome, 2007
- Celebrating Indian Cinema, 2007
- Extra! Extra! Tales from the Daily Herald Picture Library, 2007
- Sarah Jones, 2007–2008
- Henri Cartier-Bresson's Scrapbook: Photographs 1932–1946, 2007
- Sunny Snaps, 2007
- Live By the Lens, Die By the Lens, 2008
- New Works: Pavilion Commissions 2008, 2008–2009
- Breaking News: Celebrating 140 Years of the Press Association, 2008–2009
- "Here's one we made earlier..." 50 Years of Blue Peter, 2008–2009
- Baby: Picturing the Ideal Human, 2009
- Don McCullin: In England, 2009
- Animalism, 2009
- Drawings That Move: The Art of Joanna Quinn, 2009–2010
- Neeta Madahar, 2009–2010
- Robbie Cooper: Immersion, 2010
- Simon Roberts: We English, 2010
- Fay Godwin: Land Revisited, 2010–2011
- From Back Home, 2010–2011
- The Lives of Great Photographers, 2011
- David Spero: Churches, 2011
- Daniel Meadows: Early Photographic Works, 2011–2012
- Outposts: Donovan Wylie, 2011–2012
- In the Blink of an Eye, 2012
- Art of Arrangement: Photography and the Still Life Tradition, 2012–2013
- [open source]: Is the internet you know under threat?, 2012–2013
- Moving Stories: Children's Books from Page to Screen, 2013
- Bollywood Icons −100 Years of Indian Cinema, 2013
- Tom Wood: Photographs 1973–2013, 2013
- Copper Horses by Chris Harrison, 2013–2014
- Doctor Who and Me, 2013–2014
- Nature, Camera, Action!, 2014
- Open for Business, 2014
- Only in England: Photographs by Tony Ray-Jones and Martin Parr, 2014
- Joan Fontcuberta: Stranger than Fiction, 2014–2015
- Light Fantastic: Adventures in the Science of Light, 2015
- Drawn by Light: The Royal Photographic Society Collection, 2015
- Revelations: Experiments in Photography, 2015–2016
- Star Wars: The Fans Awaken, 2015–2016
- Great Interactions: Photographs by Polly Braden, 2016
- Gathered Leaves: Photographs by Alec Soth, 2016
- In Your Face, 2016
- El Salvador: Between Revolution and War, 2016
- Fox Talbot: Dawn of the Photograph, 2016–2017
- Britain in Focus: A Photographic History, 2017
- Poetics of Light: Pinhole Photography, 2017
- Supersenses, 2017
- Soyuz TMA-19M: Tim Peake's Spacecraft, 2017
- Fake News, 2017–2018
- City Girls, 2017–2018
- Thresholds and Immersion, 2018
- Action Replay, 2018–2019
- Never Alone, 2018–2019
- Above the Noise: 15 Stories from Bradford, 2019
- Gaia by Luke Jerram, 2019

== Current festival programme ==
=== Widescreen Weekend ===
This event began as part of Bradford International Film Festival and has been expanded into a 4-day standalone film festival. It takes place every October and focuses on large-screen formats and cinema technologies. It includes 70mm and Cinerama screenings.

=== Yorkshire Games Festival ===
This video game festival began in 2016. It celebrates games culture, design and production, and includes a conference programme as well as a weekend of events for families. It took place in November 2016 and 2017, before moving to a February slot for 2019. Guests at the first Yorkshire Games Festival included John Romero, Rhianna Pratchett, Charles Cecil, Warren Spector (via live video link), Brenda Romero, and presenters of The Yogscast.

=== Bradford Science Festival ===
This family science festival was first held in 2012, but was cancelled in 2016 after the previous organisers no longer had the capacity to carry it on. The museum took over the festival in 2017, in partnership with organisations including the University of Bradford, Bradford Council and Bradford College.

== Discontinued film festivals ==
The museum organised and held four major film events every year: Bradford International Film Festival, Bradford Animation Festival, Bite the Mango and Fantastic Films Weekend. These attracted international speakers and new and classic works from around the world. All four festivals were eventually cancelled by the museum.

=== Bradford International Film Festival ===
From its inception in 1995, Bradford International Film Festival (BIFF) presented new and classic films from around the world. The Festival presented films in their original formats wherever possible, and existed to develop understanding of the art and science of the moving image by hosting innovators in many fields of filmmaking.

BIFF included the Shine Awards – which highlighting the work of new European directors, a Filmmakers Weekend designed to offer guidance and support to filmmakers in the north of England, and the Widescreen Weekend, which discussed film formats including Cinerama, VistaVision, 70 mm and IMAX.

Guests at Bradford International Film Festival included Riz Ahmed, Jenny Agutter, Michael Apted, David Arnold, Thomas Arslan, Ken Annakin, Olivier Assayas, Richard Attenborough, Simon Beaufoy, Alan Bennett, James Benning, Claire Bloom, Kenneth Branagh, Adam Buxton, Jack Cardiff, Ian Carmichael, Gurinder Chadha, Tom Courtenay, Mark Cousins, Alex Cox, Brian Cox, Benedict Cumberbatch, Terence Davies, Michael Deeley, Denis Dercourt, The Dodge Brothers, James Ellis, Mike Figgis, Freddie Francis, Terry Gilliam, Stephen Graham, Richard Griffiths, Ronald Harwood, Mike Hodges, Joanna Hogg, John Hurt, Derek Jacobi, Gualtiero Jacopetti, Terry Jones, Patrick Keiller, Mark Kermode, Mike Leigh, Euan Lloyd, Ken Loach, Malcolm McDowell, Virginia McKenna, Fernando Meirelles, Kay Mellor, Metamono, Chris Morris, Barry Norman, Michael Palin, Barbara Windsor, Ray Winstone, Stephen Woolley, Thierry Zéno and many independent filmmakers from around the world.

Other special programmes included Bradford After Dark (new horror films), Alexey Balabanov, Stan Brakhage, Richard Burton, new Canadian cinema, Pierre Clementi, Alexander Dovzhenko, Hauntology, a centenary of Indian cinema, Chuck Jones, James Mason, Yoshitaro Nomura, Nicolas Roeg, sixpackfilm, American Teen Movies, Uncharted States of America (undiscovered American Cinema), Amos Vogel, and the science films of Charles Urban.

=== Bradford Animation Festival ===
The animation and video games festival was the UK's leading event of its kind; host to discussions, workshops and special events. The annual BAF Awards honoured new animation from around the world.

Past guests include representatives from studios such as Pixar, Aardman, Wētā Workshop and Sony Interactive plus animators Ray Harryhausen, Richard Williams, Bob Godfrey, Caroline Leaf, Michael Dudok de Wit and Bill Plympton.

After the museum ended the festival following its 20th edition in 2014, former museum staff successfully revived the event in Manchester in November 2015 as Manchester Animation Festival.

=== Fantastic Films Weekend ===
This festival began in 2002 as a weekend event focusing on classic ghost stories and the supernatural. It developed into an annual celebration of horror, fantasy and sci-fi cinema and television. In February 2013 it was announced that the Fantastic Films Weekend would not continue.

=== The Co-operative Film Festival ===
The Co-operative Film Festival (formerly known as the Co-operative Young Film-Makers festival) started in 1966 and ended in 2013. It was a non-competitive and not-for-profit film festival designed to encourage young people to be creative. The museum was the host venue and associate of the festival from the year 1999 until 2013.

== Notable staff ==
- Colin Ford, first Head of Museum, 1983–1993.
- Amanda Nevill, Head of Museum, 1994–2003.
