= Brett Rogers (curator) =

Australian curator

Brett Rogers OBE (born 1954) is an Australian curator mostly known for her tenure as director of The Photographers' Gallery in London. She played a key role in establishing photography as a leading art form in the UK. Prior to joining The Photographers' Gallery, Rogers was the Deputy Director and Head of Exhibitions at the Visual Arts Department at the British Council.

In 2014 she was appointed an Officer of the Order of the British Empire (OBE), for her services to the arts. In 2018 she received the Award for Outstanding Service to Photography (and Honorary Fellowship) from the Royal Photographic Society.

== Early life ==
Rogers was born in Brisbane, Australia, to disc jockey and radio broadcaster Bob Rogers and fashion model Jerry Rogers. She is one of four children.

Rogers moved to London and received an MA at the Courtauld Institute, and joined the British Council in 1982 where she developed a photography policy and programme.

== The British Council ==
Rogers worked for the Arts Department of the British Council between 1982 and 2005, during which she was Deputy Director and Head of Exhibitions. In conversation with Jack Latham in 2017, Rogers remarked that her curatorial decisions were often considered controversial. She recounts: "The British ambassador in Poland would say to me ‘We can't have Martin Parr, that's not the image of Britain we want, with all the rubbish on the ground, and people looking unhappy'. I would always argue back, saying, ‘We're not here to promote a tourist's image of Britain, we're here to promote photography'. In that respect we had a lot of battles, but we won them all."

== The Photographers' Gallery ==
Rogers became a trustee of The Photographers' Gallery in the 1990s and later, as Head of Exhibitions of the British Council, she co-curated the exhibition with Kate Bush, Senior Programmer at the Gallery in 2002.

In 2005, Rogers was appointed director of The Photographers' Gallery, succeeding Paul Wombell. She oversaw the Gallery's move from Great Newport Street to Ramillies Street and a major redevelopment of the new premises. The refurbished building reopened in 2012.

In July 2022, Rogers announced that she would be leaving her role as director at the end of 2022.

== Awards ==
- 2018: Award for Outstanding Service to Photography (and Honorary Fellowship), Royal Photographic Society, Bath
