= Colin Ford (curator) =

British photographic curator (1934–2025)

- Born: Colin John Ford; 13 May 1934; Battersea, London, England
- Died: 21 December 2025 (aged 91)
- Citizenship: British
- Education: University College, Oxford
- Occupations: Photographic curator, historian of photography and museum director
- Known for: Keeper at the National Portrait Gallery, London; Director of the National Museum of Photography, Film and Television; Director of the National Museums and Galleries of Wales
- Awards: Commander of the Order of the British Empire

Colin John Ford CBE (13 May 1934 – 21 December 2025) was a British photographic curator, historian of photography and museum director. He wrote a number of books on the history of photography.

== Life and career ==
Ford was born in Battersea, London, England, on 13 May 1934. He was educated at University College, Oxford University, where he directed plays for the University College Players, including at the Edinburgh Fringe. He began his career in the theatre. He was a director and broadcaster. Between 1972 and 1982 he was keeper of film and photography at the National Portrait Gallery, London. He then became the first director of the UK National Museum of Photography, Film and Television in Bradford (later to become the National Media Museum). From 1992 he was Director of the National Museums and Galleries of Wales.

He interviewed contemporary photographers such as Don McCullin. He also gave lectures on the history of photography.

Until 2010, he was chairman of the Kraszna-Krausz Foundation. He was vice-president of the Julia Margaret Cameron Trust from 2005 to 2020 and chairman of the Peel Entertainment Group.

Ford died on 21 December 2025, at the age of 91.

== Books ==
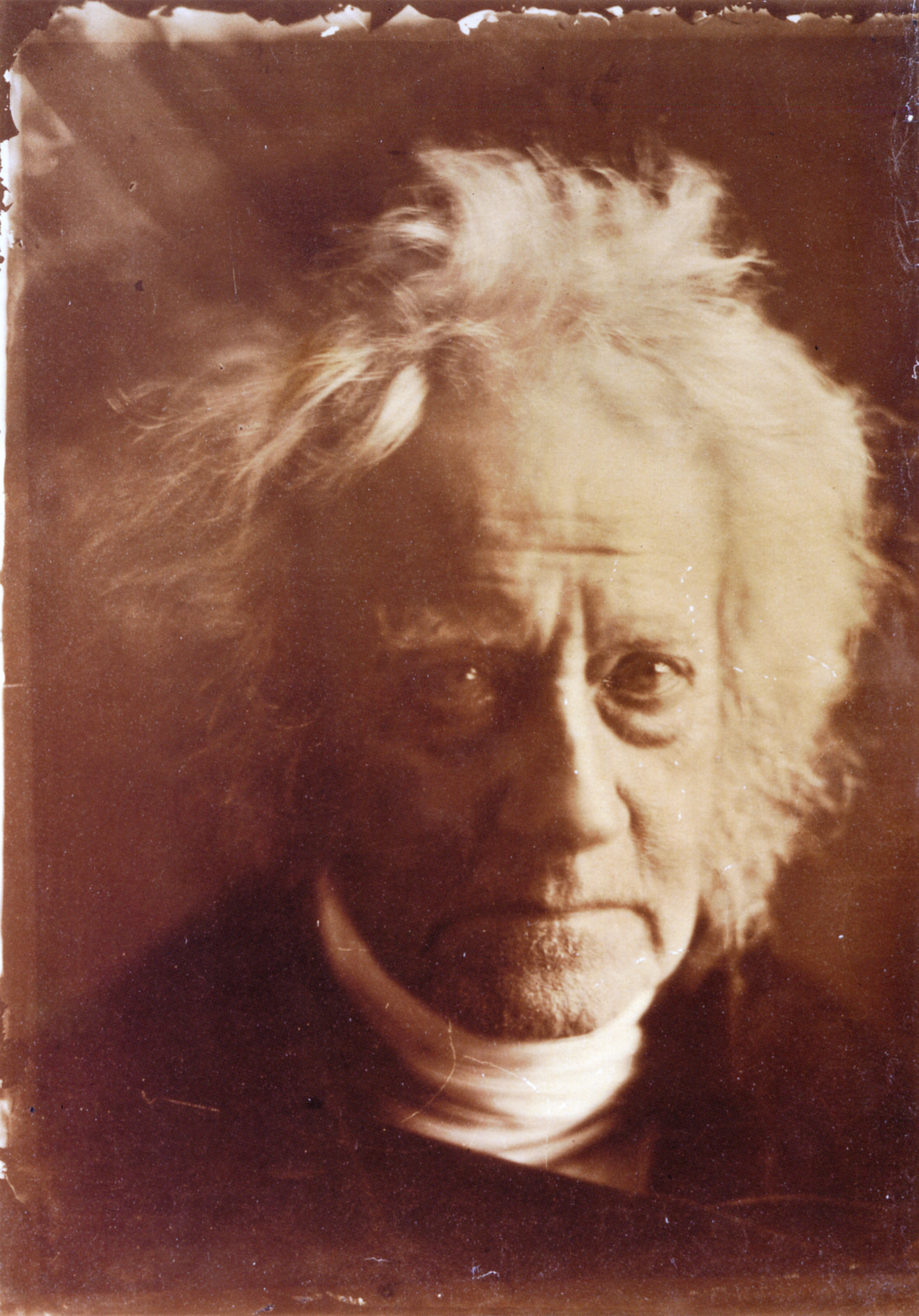
Photograph of Sir John Herschel by Julia Margaret Cameron, an illustration in Ford's book Julia Margaret Cameron: 19th Century Photographer of Genius.

- An Early Victorian Album: The Photographic Masterpieces of David Octavius Hill and Robert Adamson (1974).
- The Cameron Collection: An Album of Photographs by Julia Margaret Cameron (1975).
- Portraits (1982).
- Eyewitness: Hungarian Photography in the 20th Century: Brassaï, Capa, Kertész, Moholy-Nagy, Munkásci, Royal Academy of Arts (2011), with Péter Baki. ISBN 978-1905711765.

== Awards and legacy ==
Ford was appointed a Commander of the Order of the British Empire (CBE) in 1993. He was awarded the Hungarian Order of Merit in 2013.

The Royal Photographic Society established the annual Colin Ford Award in 2003 for contributions to curatorship, named after Colin Ford as the first director of the National Museum of Photography, Film and Television.

There are several photographs of Ford in the National Portrait Gallery (London) collection, including works by Arnold Newman, Norman Parkinson, and Cheryl Twomey.
