= The Photographers' Gallery =

Photography gallery in London

Coordinates: 51.5148°N 0.1389°W

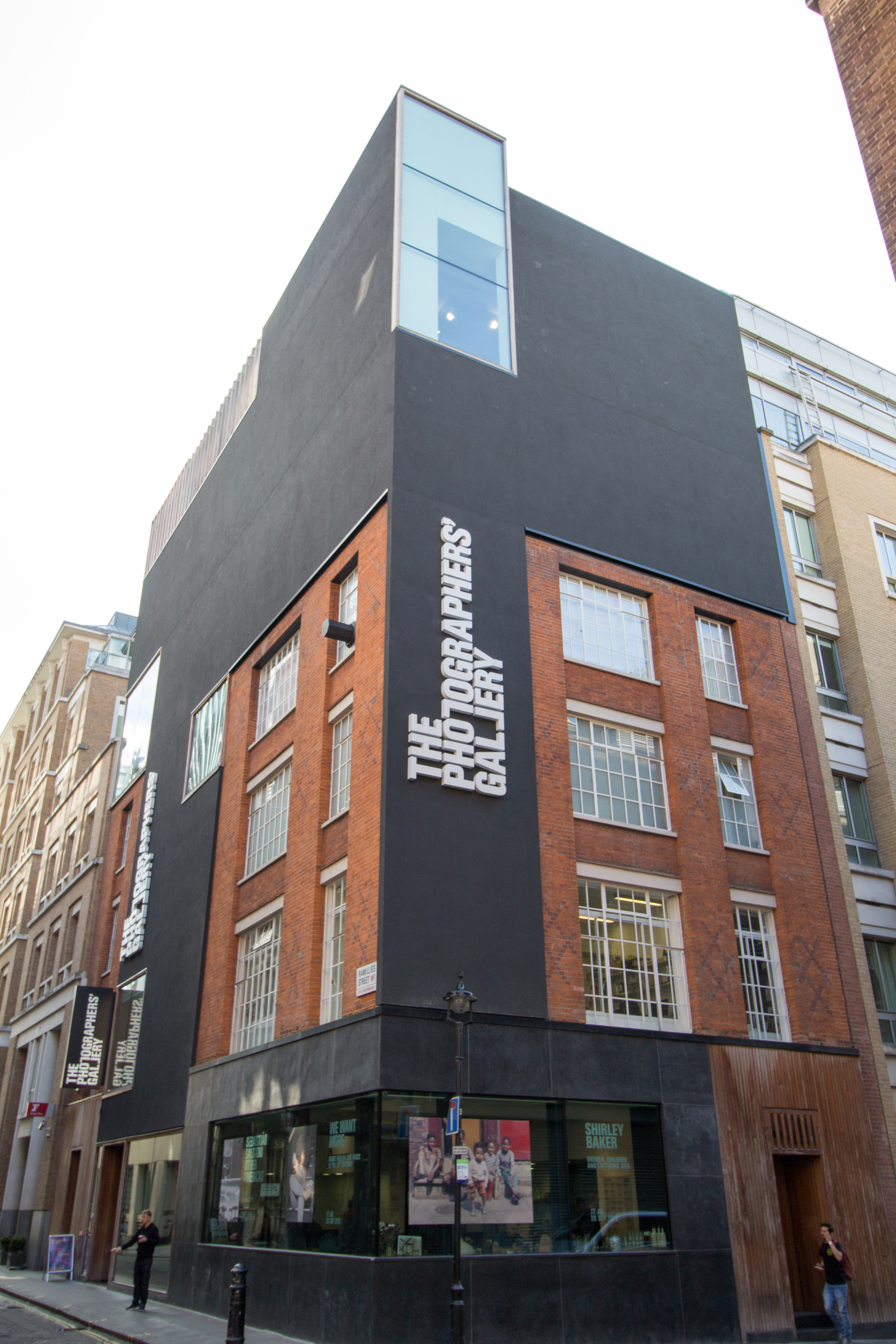

- Location within Central London
- Established: 1971; 55 years ago
- Location: Ramillies Street; London, W1; United Kingdom
- Director: Shoair Mavlian
- Public transit access: Oxford Circus
- Website: thephotographersgallery.org.uk

The Photographers' Gallery was founded in London by Sue Davies and opened on 14 January 1971 as the first public gallery in the United Kingdom devoted solely to photography.

It is also home to the Deutsche Börse Photography Prize, established in 1996 to identify and reward photographic talent and innovation, and the Bar-Tur Photobook Award.

== History ==
Founder and director Sue Davies established the original home of the Photographers' Gallery in a converted Lyons Tea Bar at No. 8 Great Newport Street in London's Covent Garden. Initially free to the public, the gallery offered a dedicated space for photography and photographers—the first of its kind in the UK.

The inaugural exhibition on 14 January 1971 was The Concerned Photographer, an exhibition first shown in New York and curated by photojournalist Cornell Capa.

In 1980, the Gallery acquired a neighbouring space at No. 5 Great Newport Street, extending its exhibition spaces and providing room for a bookshop and café. It was also able to accommodate an area for print sales, which focused on promoting and selling the work of photographers with proceeds going towards supporting the public programme.

Over the next four decades, the Gallery delivered a programme of exhibitions, talks and educational activities. The gallery has introduced international photographers Juergen Teller, Robert Capa, Sebastião Salgado, Andreas Gursky, Shirana Shahbazi and Taryn Simon to British audiences, while showing the work of UK-based photographers including Martin Parr, Zineb Sedira, Melanie Manchot, Nick Knight, Corinne Day and Nick Waplington.

Davies was director of the gallery for two decades and retired in 1991. She was followed by Sue Grayson Ford, for two years, who left for family reasons in March 1994. In 2005, Brett Rogers was appointed director, succeeding Paul Wombell who had been in the position since 1994 and oversaw the purchase, with a £3.5m Arts Council grant, of a new venue at 16–18 Ramillies Street, Soho.

In May 2012 after a major capital campaign and redevelopment, The Photographers' Gallery opened at its new and current home in a former textiles warehouse. Designed by Irish architects O'Donnell & Tuomey, this building in the West End has three exhibition spaces, a print sales gallery, an education and learning studio, digital media screen, bookshop and café.

In July 2022, Rogers announced that she would leave her role as director at the end of 2022, succeeded, from January 2023, by Shoair Mavlian. Mavlian was assistant curator at Tate Modern and later director of Photoworks in Brighton from 2018.

== Deutsche Börse Photography Foundation Prize ==
The Deutsche Börse Photography Foundation Prize annually rewards a photographer who has made the most significant contribution to the photographic medium in Europe during the past year. The prize was set up in 1996 by The Photographers' Gallery. Between 1997 and 2004, the prize was known as the Citigroup Photography Prize. Deutsche Börse has sponsored the competition since 2005, with a £30,000 prize. It has been described as "the biggest of its kind in photography in Europe" and "the most prestigious". Past winners of the £30,000 award include Andreas Gursky (1998), Juergen Teller (2003), Luc Delahaye (2005), Robert Adams (2006), Walid Raad (2007), Sophie Ristelhueber (2010), artists' duo Adam Broomberg & Oliver Chanarin (2013), and Richard Mosse (2014). The 2017 winner was Dana Lixenberg.

== Bar-Tur Photobook Award ==
The Bar-Tur Photobook Award was created in 2014 in memory of British artist, Lesley-Ann Bar Tur. It supports (previously unpublished) photographers and artists in realising a photobook project through provision of a £20,000 production fee and partnership with an independent publisher. The inaugural award went to Angus Fraser who published Santa Muerte with Trolley Books in 2014. In 2015, Jack Latham won with Sugar Paper Theories, which was published by Here Press.

== Publications ==
The Photographers' Gallery publishes books for some of its exhibitions.

Loose Associations is a quarterly publication from The Photographers' Gallery which commissions and publishes essays, images and artist projects related to but not defined by its programme.
