= List of early wide-gauge films =

These early wide film processes employed a number of different frame sizes and perforations per frame (known as Film gauge).

- Films made by American Mutoscope and Biograph (US 1895) a) 62 mm, 1.36:1, 6 perf. - b) 2 7/8 inch, 1.19:1
- Films made by Demeny-Gaumont (France 1895) - Chronophotographe, 60 mm, 1.22:1, 4 perf.
- Henry Regatta (UK 1896 July) Birt Acres, Barnet, England - Palace Theatre, London, March 17 1897
- Films made by Biograph (US 1897-1900), 68 mm, 1.375:1, non-perf.
- The Corbett-Fitzsimmons Fight - Enoch J. Rector - Veriscope USA 1897, 63 mm, 1.65:1, 5 perf. (filmed March 17, 1897, released May 22, 1897)
- A film for Burton Holmes (UK 1890s) 2 3/8 inch, 1.31:1, 4 perf.
- Lumière widefilm (France 1900), 75 mm (widest format ever), 1.2:1, 8 perf.
- Il sacco di Roma (first wide screen feature) (Italy 1923) Enrico Guazzoni, one sequence in Alberini Panoramica/Panoramico Alberini: Italy 1914, Filoteo Alberini, 2.20:1 (2.52:1?), 5 perf., shot with rotating wide angle 65°
- Widescope (US 1921 /1927?) 57 mm, twin-lens camera, rotating lens; the split film was screened in 2 projectors
- Niagara Falls (US 1923) Essanay, George K Spoor/P John Berggren, short, tinted or toned - Natural Vision = 63 mm (63,5 mm?), 1.73:1, 6 perf., separate 35 mm soundtrack, other screenings in 35 mm Magnascope
- Tri-Ergon: German company, 42 mm 1924, New York
- Rollercoaster Ride (US 1926) short - Natural Vision
- You're in the Army Now (US 1929) July 18 in New York, only screening, Joseph Stanley, 2 reels - Magnafilm/Magnifilm Paramount 1929, Lorenzo del Riccio, 56 mm, 1.85:1 (ca 2.20:1?), 4 perf. (also 35 mm for cropping 1.85:1 with Magnascope)
- Fox Grandeur News (US 1929 Aug 25) 1 reel - Fox Grandeur = Fox 1929-31, oversized soundtrack, experiment only with Perspecta-type directional sound, 2.13:1, 4 perf., Mitchell-camera (also 35 mm shown in Magnascope)
- Fox Movietone Follies of 1929 (US 1929 May 29) David Butler, Marcel Silver, 80 min - Fox Grandeur (also 35 mm with Technicolor sequence)
- Happy Days (US 1930 Feb 13) Benjamin Stoloff, 86 min - Fox Grandeur
- Niagara Falls (US 1930 Feb 13) 1 reel, from footage for Fox Grandeur News - Fox Grandeur
- Song o' My Heart (US 1930 March 11) Frank Borzage - Fox Grandeur
- The Big Trail (US 1930 Oct 24) Raoul Walsh, 122 min - Fox Grandeur, converted to 35 mm scope in 1985, also German and French 35 mm versions: Die grosse fahrt and La piste des géants (P Couderc)
- Campus Sweethearts (US 1930 RKO, J Leo Meehan, 27 min, only shown at State Lake, Chicago - Natural Vision (also 35 mm)
- Danger Lights (US 1930) RKO, George B Seitz, 87 min, (short?) (only shown at State Lake, Chicago?) - Natural Vision (also 35 mm)
- Fox 50 mm Wide Screen: ca 1930 4 perf, 1.77:1
- A Soldier's Plaything (US 1930) Michael Curtiz, 57 min; - Vitascope = Warner 1931, 65 mm, 2.25:1, 5 perf. separate soundtrack, (also 35 mm released 1931 May 71 min)
- Song of the Flame (1930) - Vitascope; first color film (in Technicolor) to use widescreen.
- The Lash (1930) - Vitascope; also shot simultaneously in 35 mm
- The Bat Whispers (1930 Nov 13) Roland West - Magnifilm, exhibited only in 35 mm, miniature and special effects scenes shot in 35 mm and re-photographed in 70 mm
- Billy the Kid (1930 Oct 19) King Vidor - Realife; also shot in 35 mm, which was cropped in some cinemas; exhibited only in 35 mm
- The Lash/Adios (US 1931) Jan 1, Frank Lloyd, 79 min - Vitascope
- Kismet (US 1930) John Francis Dillon, 87 min, 1 min prolog showed the difference between 35 mm and Vitascope (also 35 mm - also German version by William Dieterle)
- The Great Meadow (1931 March 15) Charles Brabin - Realife; also filmed in 35 mm, exhibited only in 35 mm

== See also ==
- List of 70mm films
- 70 mm film
- 70 mm Grandeur film
- List of film formats
