= Widescreen =

Aspect ratio of a displayed image

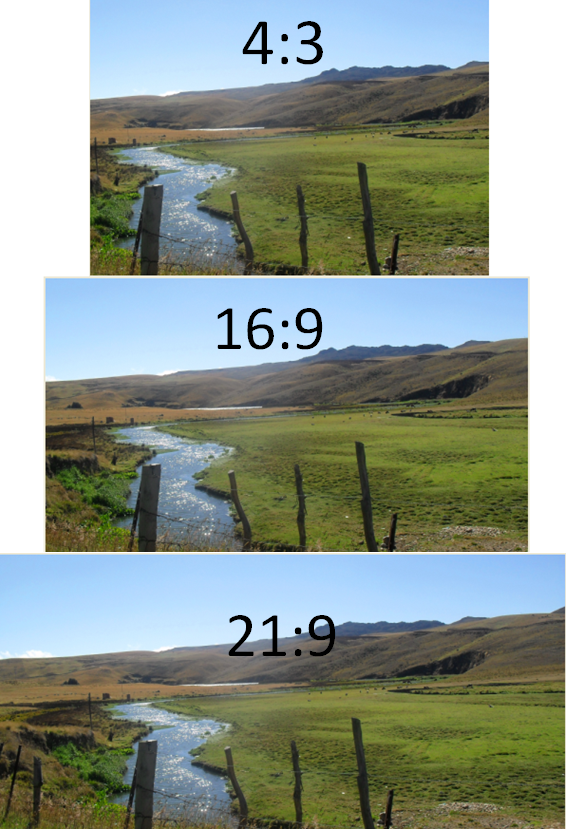
Classic television aspect ratio 4:3, and two wider ratios

Widescreen images are displayed within a set of aspect ratios (relationship of image width to height) used in film, television and computer screens.

For TV, the original screen ratio for broadcasts was in 4:3 (1.33:1). Largely between the 1990s and early 2000s, at varying paces in different countries, 16:9 (e.g. 1920×1080p 60p) widescreen displays came into increasingly common use by high definitions.

With computer displays, aspect ratios other than 4:3 (e.g. 1920×1440) are also referred to as "widescreen". Widescreen computer displays were previously made in a 16:10 aspect ratio (e.g. 1920×1200), but nowadays they are 16:9 (e.g. 1920×1080, 2560×1440, 3840×2160), though there has been a resurgence in the 16:10 aspect ratio on laptops since 2020 due to consumer preference for more vertical screen real estate, and it has seen continued use on tablets and handheld gaming consoles.

== Film ==
=== History ===
Widescreen was first used for The Corbett-Fitzsimmons Fight (1897). This was not only the longest film that had been released to date at 100 minutes, but also the first widescreen film being shot on 63 mm Eastman stock with five perforations per frame.

Widescreen was first widely used in the late 1920s in some short films and newsreels, and feature films, notably Abel Gance's film Napoleon (1927) with a final widescreen sequence in what Gance called Polyvision. Claude Autant-Lara released a film Pour construire un feu (To Build a Fire, 1928) in the early Henri Chrétien widescreen process, later adapted by 20th Century Fox for CinemaScope in 1952.

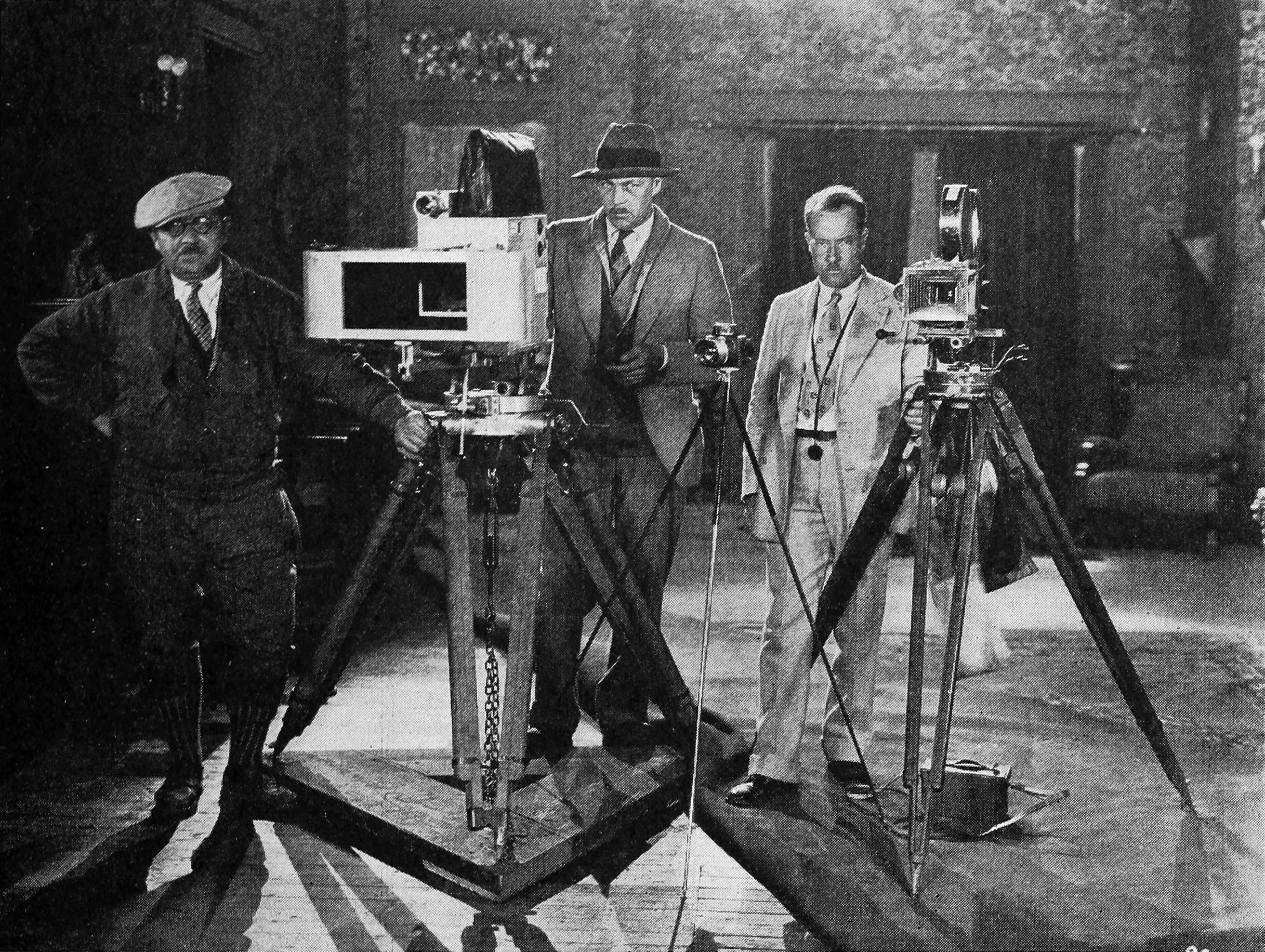
Conrad Luperti, J. Marvin Spoor, and William S. Adams with the Natural Vision camera

The experimental Natural Vision widescreen process developed by George K. Spoor and P. John Berggren used 63.5 mm film and had a 2:1 aspect ratio. In 1926, a Natural Vision film of Niagara Falls was released. In 1927, the Natural Vision process was used in the production of The American a.k.a. The Flag Maker. It was directed by J. Stuart Blackton and starred Bessie Love and Charles Ray, but was never released theatrically.

On May 26, 1929, Fox Film Corporation released Fox Grandeur News and Fox Movietone Follies of 1929 in New York City in the Fox Grandeur process. Other films shot in widescreen were the musical Happy Days (1929) which premiered at the Roxy Theater, New York City, on February 13, 1930, starring Janet Gaynor and Charles Farrell and a 12-year-old Betty Grable as a chorus girl; Song o' My Heart, a musical feature starring Irish tenor John McCormack and directed by Frank Borzage (Seventh Heaven, A Farewell to Arms), which was shipped from the labs on March 17, 1930, but never released and may no longer survive, according to film historian Miles Kreuger (the 35 mm version, however, debuted in New York on March 11, 1930); and the western The Big Trail (1930) starring John Wayne and Tyrone Power, Sr. which premiered at Grauman's Chinese Theatre in Hollywood on October 2, 1930, all of which were also made in the 70 mm Fox Grandeur process.

RKO Radio Pictures released Danger Lights with Jean Arthur, Louis Wolheim, and Robert Armstrong on August 21, 1930 in a 65 mm widescreen process known as NaturalVision, invented by film pioneer George K. Spoor. On November 13, 1930, United Artists released The Bat Whispers directed by Roland West in a 70 mm widescreen process known as Magnafilm. Warner Brothers released Song of the Flame and Kismet (both 1930) in a widescreen process they called Vitascope.

In 1930, after experimenting with the system called Fantom Screen for The Trail of '98 (1928), MGM came out with a system called Realife. MGM filmed The Great Meadow (1930) in Realife. However, it is unclear whether it was released in that widescreen process due to declining interest of the movie-going public.

By 1932, the Great Depression had forced studios to cut back on needless expense and it was not until 1953 that wider aspect ratios were again used in an attempt to stop the fall in attendance due, partially, to the emergence of television in the U.S. However, a few producers and directors, among them Alfred Hitchcock, were reluctant to use the anamorphic widescreen size featured in such formats as Cinemascope. Hitchcock used VistaVision, a non-anamorphic widescreen process developed by Paramount Pictures and Technicolor which could be adjusted to present various flat aspect ratios.

=== Types ===
Masked (or flat) widescreen was introduced in April 1953. The negative is shot exposing the Academy ratio using spherical lenses, but the top and bottom of the picture are hidden or masked off by a metal aperture plate, cut to specifications of the theater's screen, in the projector. Alternatively, a hard matte in the printing or shooting stages may be used to mask off those areas while filming for composition purposes, but an aperture plate is still used to block off the appropriate areas in the theater. A detriment is that the film grain size is thus increased because only part of the image is being expanded to full height. Films are designed to be shown in cinemas in masked widescreen format but the full unmasked frame is sometimes used for television, known as an open matte. In such an instance, a photographer will compose for widescreen, but "protect" the full image from things such as microphones and other filming equipment. Standardized "flat widescreen" ratios are 1.66:1, 1.75:1, 1.85:1, and 2:1. The 1.85:1 aspect ratio has become the predominant aspect ratio for the format.

35 mm anamorphic – This type of widescreen is used for CinemaScope, Panavision, and several other equivalent processes. The film is essentially shot "squeezed", so that the actors appear vertically elongated on the actual film. A special lens inside the projector unsqueezes the image so that it will appear normal. Films shot in CinemaScope or Panavision are usually projected at a 2.39:1 aspect ratio, though the historical aspect ratio can be 2.66:1 (original separate magnetic sound aspect ratio), 2.55:1 (original four-track magnetic sound aspect ratio) or 2.35:1 (original mono optical sound aspect ratio, and much later "stereo variable-area" aspect ratio, also called Dolby Stereo). The negative is usually 2.66:1 or, in rare cases, 2.55:1 or 2.35:1. The sole purpose of the change to 2.39:1 and, later, to 2.40:1, was to better hide so-called "negative assembly" splices (splices employed in the composited camera negative. This was not a production change, rather it was a recommended projection change.)

A Chilean film, Post Mortem, used anamorphic lenses with 16 mm film, to be projected at an ultra-widescreen 2.66:1 for a unique look.

Super gauges – The full negative frame, including the area traditionally reserved for the sound track, is filmed using "full" aperture, which was standard for silent, but also common for most anamorphic negatives. The print is then shrunk and/or cropped in order to fit it back onto release prints, which include a sound track. The aspect ratio for Super 35, for example, can be set to virtually any projection standard.

Large gauge – A 70 mm film frame is not only twice as wide as a standard frame but also has greater height (five perfs versus four perfs). Shooting and projecting a film in 70 mm therefore gives more than four times the image area of non-anamorphic 35 mm film providing a major improvement in image quality. Few major dramatic narrative films have been filmed entirely on this format since the 1970s; the three most recent are Kenneth Branagh's Hamlet, Paul Thomas Anderson's The Master and Quentin Tarantino's The Hateful Eight. For many years, large budget pictures shot anamorphically used reserve stocks of 70 mm film for SFX shots involving CGI or blue-screen compositing as the anamorphic format creates problems with said effects. It has also been used to sometimes strike 70 mm blow-up prints for "roadshow" tours in select cities from the 35 mm camera negative in order to capitalize on the extra sound channels provided. The introduction of digital sound systems and diminishing number of installed 70 mm projectors has made a 70 mm release largely obsolete. However, blowups from 35 mm formats to IMAX have been used for a limited number of blockbuster films.

Paramount's VistaVision was a larger gauge precursor to 70 mm film. Introduced in 1954, it ran standard 35 mm film through the camera horizontally to achieve a widescreen effect using greater negative area, in order to create a finer-grained four-perforation 35 mm prints in an era where standard monopack stock could not produce finer results. Negative frames were eight perforations wide. Eight-perf photography is sometimes used for shooting special effects in order to produce a finer-grained matte that can be used in optical printing without image degradation, and is notable for its use in Lucasfilm's original three Star Wars films, among others. Another similar system with horizontal orientation was MGM's Arnoldscope.

Multiple lens camera/multiple projectors – The Cinerama system originally involved shooting with three lens camera, and projecting the three resulting films on a curved screen with three synchronized projectors, resulting in an ultrawide aspect ratio of 2.89. Later Cinerama movies were shot in 70 mm anamorphic (see below), and the resultant widescreen image was divided into three by optical printers to produce the final threefold prints.

The technical drawbacks of Cinerama are discussed in its own article. Only two narrative feature films, The Wonderful World of the Brothers Grimm and How the West Was Won, were filmed in three-camera Cinerama, and several sequences from the latter were actually filmed in Ultra-Panavision. With the exception of a few films created sporadically for use in specialty Cinerama theaters, the format is effectively obsolete.

A non-Cinerama, three-projector process was pioneered for the final reel of Abel Gance's epic film Napoléon (1927) The process, called Polyvision by Gance, consisted of three 1.33:1 images side by side, so that the total aspect ratio of the image is 4:1. The technical difficulties in mounting a full screening of the film, however, make most theaters unwilling or unable to show it in this format.

Between 1956 and 1957, the Soviets developed Kinopanorama, which is identical in most respects to the original three-camera Cinerama.

Anamorphic 70 mm – 70 mm with anamorphic lenses, popularly known as "Ultra Panavision" or "MGM Camera 65", creates an even wider high-quality picture. This camera process was used for the remake of Ben-Hur (1959), resulting in an aspect ratio of 2.76:1, one of the widest projected images ever used for a feature film. The 70 mm anamorphic format was not commonly used, due to the high production costs, although it was favored for epic films such as Ben-Hur in order to capture wide panoramic landscapes and high-budget scenes with thousands of extras and enormous sets. This system is obsolete.

== Television ==
The original screen ratio for TV broadcasts was 4:3 (1.33:1). This was the same aspect ratio as most cinema screens and films at the time TV was first sold commercially. 1930s and 1940s films in 4:3, such as Gone with the Wind, have always been displayed on television in 4:3, filling the entire frame.

When preparing a film that was originally intended to be displayed in widescreen for TV broadcast the material was often edited with the sides truncated, using techniques such as center cut or pan and scan. Sometimes, in the case of Super 35, the full film negative was shown unmasked on TV (that is, with the hard matte removed). However, this causes the 4:3 image not to be what the director intended the audience to see, and sometimes boom mics, edited out of the shot when the picture is matted, can be visible. Current TVs feature a 16:9 aspect ratio, allowing them to display a 16:9 picture without letterboxing.

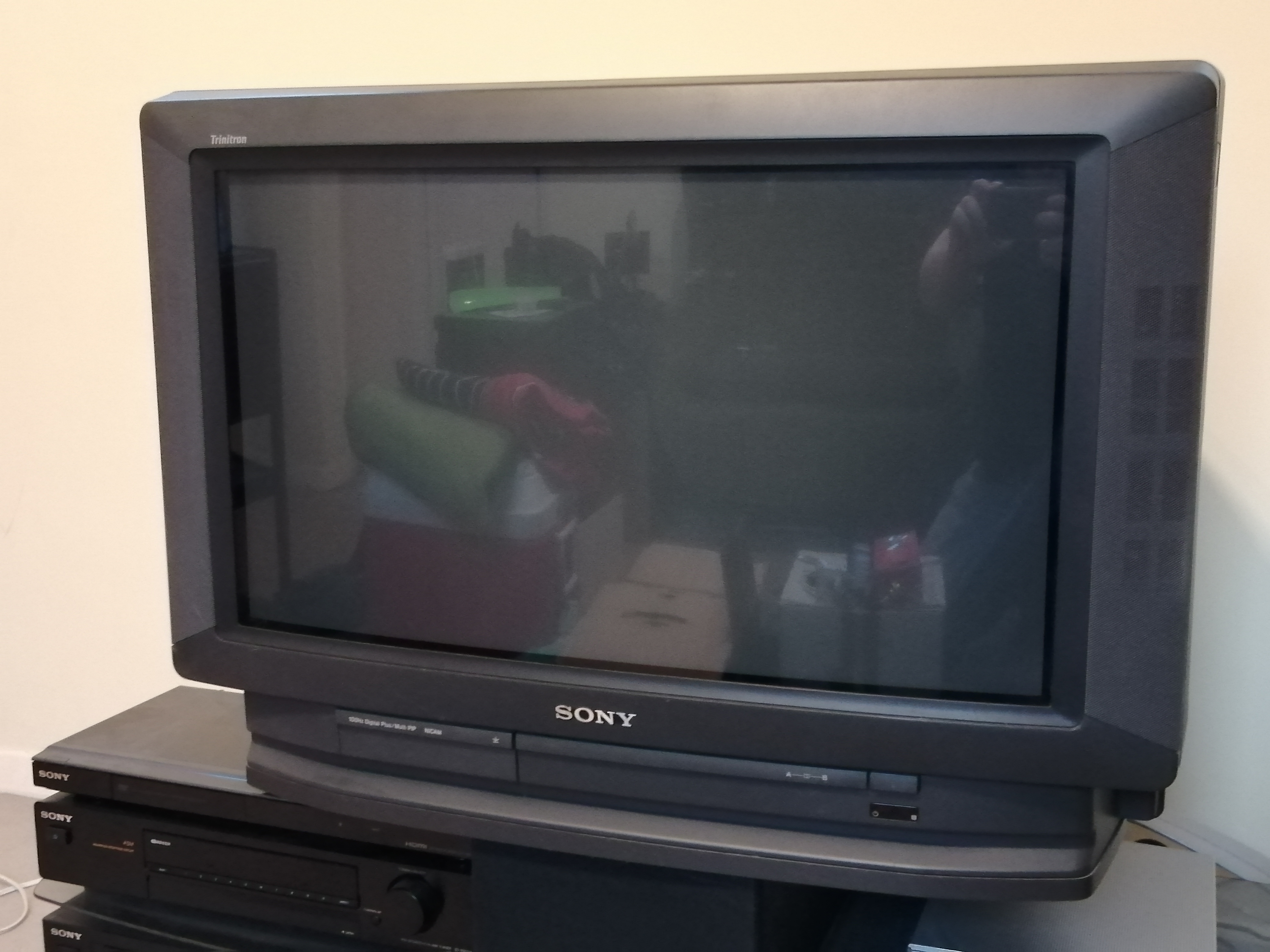
An early (1994) Sony widescreen television

Japan saw its first commercially available widescreen TV models in 1992 and TV networks began broadcasting in EDTV widescreen in 1995, starting with NTV.

The first widescreen TV sold in the United States was the Thomson Consumer Electronics RCA CinemaScreen, released in 1993. In Europe, the PAL and the French SECAM Standard Definition systems employed higher resolutions than the US NTSC Standard Definition system, which meant the quality issues of letterboxed or matted movies on TV were not as severe. There is also an extension to PAL, called PALplus, which allows specially equipped receivers to display a PAL picture as true 16:9 with a full 576 lines of vertical resolution, provided that the station employs the same system. Standard PAL receivers will receive such a broadcast as a 16:9 image letterboxed to 4:3, with a small amount of color noise in the black bars; this "noise" is actually the additional lines which are hidden inside the color signal. Clear-Vision supports an equivalent widescreen system for NTSC analogue broadcasting.

Despite the existence of PALplus and support for widescreen in the DVB-based digital satellite, terrestrial and cable broadcasts in use across Europe, only Belgium, Ireland, the Netherlands, Austria, Germany, the Nordic countries and the UK initially adopted widescreen on a large scale, with over half of all widescreen channels available by satellite in Europe targeting those areas. The UK, in particular, began moving to widescreen with the advent of digital terrestrial television in the late 1990s, and commercials were required to be delivered to broadcasters in widescreen as of 1 July 2000, on their widescreen "C-Day".

Widescreen televisions are typically used in conjunction with Digital, High-Definition Television (HDTV) receivers, or Standard-Definition (SD) DVD players and other digital television sources. Digital material is provided to widescreen TVs either in high-definition format, which is natively 16:9 (1.78:1), or as an anamorphically compressed standard-definition picture. Typically, devices decoding Digital Standard-Definition pictures can be programmed to provide anamorphic widescreen formatting, for 16:9 sets, and formatting for 4:3 sets. Pan-and-scan mode can be used on 4:3 if the producers of the material have included the necessary panning data; if this data is absent, letterboxing or centre cut-out is used.

In addition to this, by the late 1990s, some television shows such as The Sopranos and Buffy the Vampire Slayer, began producing its episodes in 16:9, despite said episodes being cropped into 4:3 for its initial premieres, before widescreen became more generalized. Animated series also began to be produced as such, with House of Mouse and Kim Possible at Disney Television Animation being some of the earliest examples.

HD DVD and Blu-ray players were introduced in 2006. Toshiba ceased production of HD DVD players in early 2008. Consumer camcorders are also available in the HD-video format at fairly low prices. These developments resulted in more options for viewing widescreen images on television monitors.

The increase in adoption of HDTVs and high-definition compatible devices such as video game consoles, combined with the digital television transition where most of the existing analogue broadcasts were permanently shut down, resulted in 16:9 widescreen becoming the main standard for television screens during the early to mid 2010s, fully replacing the previously established 4:3 standard.

== See also ==
- Active Format Description (AFD)
- Anamorphic widescreen
- Aspect ratio (image)
- C-Day
- Cine 160
- Full frame
- Head-up display
- IMAX
- Letterboxing (filming)
- List of common display resolutions
- List of motion picture film formats
- Index of articles related to motion pictures
- Open matte
- Pan and scan
- Ultrawide formats
- Widescreen display modes
- Widescreen signaling (WSS)
