= Mitchell Camera =

American movie camera manufacturer (1919–1979)

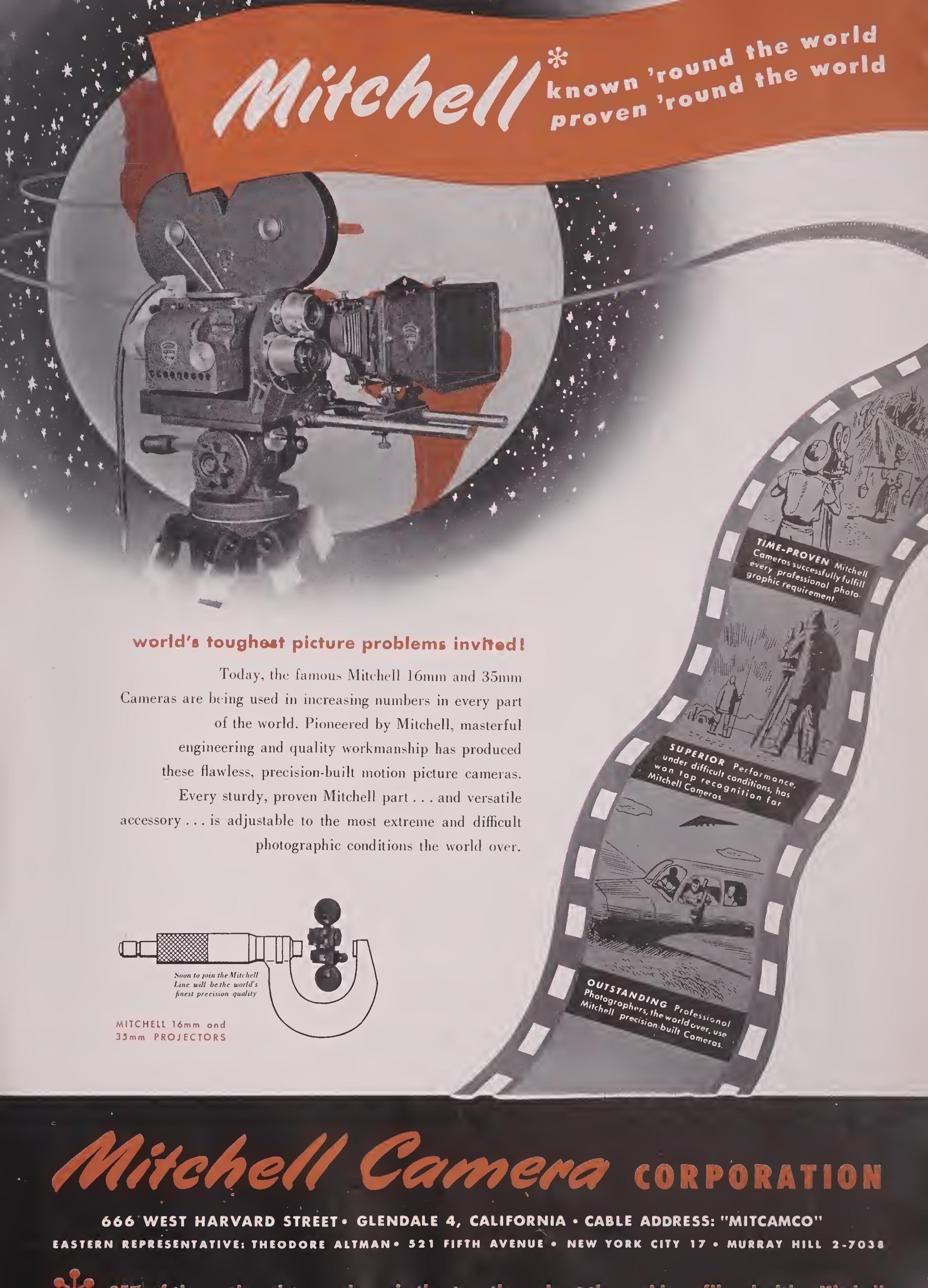
Mitchell Camera Corporation 1950 ad

Mitchell Camera Corporation was an American motion picture camera manufacturing company established in Los Angeles in 1919. It was a primary supplier of newsreel and movie cameras for decades, until its closure in 1979.

Unpublished products by Mitchell Camera was the high-speed 70mm camera which was used on the SR-71 Blackbird, manufactured in Glendale and Sun Valley, California.

== History ==
The Mitchell Camera Corporation was founded in 1919 by Henry Boeger and George Alfred Mitchell as the National Motion Picture Repair Co. Its first camera was designed and patented by John E. Leonard in 1917, and from 1920 on, was known as the Mitchell Standard Studio Camera. Features included a planetary gear-driven variable shutter U.S. patent 1,297,703 and a unique rack-over design U.S. patent 1,297,704. George Mitchell perfected and upgraded Leonard's original design, and went on to produce the most beloved and most universally used motion picture cameras of the Golden Age of Hollywood under the name of The Mitchell Camera Company. The company was first headquartered on Sunset Blvd in Los Angeles, then building a new factory in West Hollywood and moving there in 1930, and finally moving operations to its factory location in Glendale, California in the 1940s. Its final location was in Sun Valley California where it moved in the 1970's.

The Mitchell Camera Movement was utilized for animation in George Lucas Star Wars films.

Mitchell Camera Corporation was privately and quietly purchased in mid 1929 by William Fox of Fox Film Studios, just before the Great Depression began, though George Mitchell continued working with the company until he retired in the 1950s. Although William Fox had lost control and possession of his own Fox Film Studios and theaters empire in March of 1930, he apparently quietly retained possession of the Mitchell Camera Company, as his two daughters still owned the Mitchell Camera Company when it closed in 1979.

Mitchell Camera Supplies were supplied by Mitchell Camera Corporation management through the late 1980's.

== Technology ==
Mitchell Camera also supplied camera intermittent movements for Technicolor's three-strip camera (1932), and such movements for others' 65mm and VistaVision conversions before later making complete 65mm and VistaVision cameras in normal and high speed.

Mitchell also made a pin-registered background plate projector with a carbon arc lamphouse which was synchronized with the film camera. One of the first MPRPPs (Mitchell Pin Registered Process Projector) was used in Gone with the Wind. Two- and three-headed background projectors evolved for VistaVision effects.

George Mitchell received an Academy Honorary Award in 1952. The Mitchell Camera Company received Academy Awards for Technical Achievement in 1939, 1966 and 1968.

== Models ==
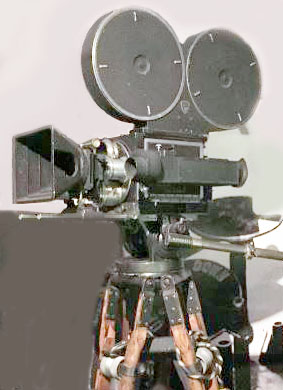
- 1935 model Mitchell NC Camera
  Mitchell Standard 35mm camera - The original Mitchell rackover pin-registered studio camera, introduced in 1920 as a hand-cranked silent film camera. The rackover device allowed the camera portion with its side-mounted viewfinder to be "racked over" upon its base by turning a handle on the rear of the camera base. By racking to the right, the operator would focus the lens upon a ground glass element seen through the viewfinder. By racking back to the left, the camera with its film would be brought into position to record the view of the now focused lens. This standard model came with a four-lens turret, a matte box on rails mounted to the front of the camera, and options included a Veeder-Root film footage counter, behind the lens iris, four-way adjustable frame mattes, automatic or hand dissolve, internal matte disk with nine pre-cut mattes including ½ frame, circles, keyhole, binocular, and oval. Various improvements and available options on this model took place over subsequent years, including a frames-per-second film speed meter, addition of a side-view parallax finder with upright view, various electric motors including variable speed, constant speed, and synchronized motors. The talking pictures introduced in 1926 soon required this somewhat noisy camera to run more quietly with the so-called "silent" film movements, and soon thereafter a higher-speed "silent" movement and follow-focus devices were made available.
- Mitchell FC 70mm Fox Grandeur Studio Camera - Introduced in 1929, this camera was the first successful early widescreen attempt. The original 1929 Mitchell 70mm FC studio cameras are not to be confused with the later Mitchell 65mm Model FC and BFC 1957 second generation studio cameras. The original Mitchell FC Fox Grandeur 70mm studio camera is an enlarged version of the mid 1920s Mitchell "Standard" 35mm Studio Camera. The FC Fox Grandeur camera was adapted to accept 4-perf 70mm film stock. These cameras were originally developed in 1928 and ordered from Mitchell Camera Corporation by William Fox through his Fox-Case Corporation (Theodore Case, along with his assistant Earl Sponable, were the developers of the "MovieTone" sound on film system). It is unknown if the letters; "FC" in the model designation originally stood for "Fox-Case" or for "Fox Camera". After a prototype Grandeur camera was produced by George Mitchell in 1928, the first three Mitchell 70mm FC Fox Grandeur production cameras were delivered to Fox-Case in New York in mid May 1929, then forwarded to William Fox's Fox Film Studios (camera serial numbers FC-1, FC-2, and FC-3). Camera Number FC-1 was subsequently returned to the Mitchell factory, possibly because it was then removed from its studio L-Base, and made into a sync-sound audio on film recording camera, with the synced sound footage to later be synchronized to the photo recording camera's footage for editing and release prints. A total of eight or nine 70mm Fox FC Grandeur cameras had been delivered to Fox-Case/Fox Film Studios by April 1930 when The Big Trail began shooting. Fox Studios abandoned the 70mm Grandeur format after The Big Trail failed to financially perform to expectations. Four additional Mitchell FC Grandeur cameras had been delivered to Metro-Goldwyn-Mayer (MGM) in February 1930, and one additional Mitchell FC Grandeur camera was delivered to Feature Productions in 1930. Only a few widescreen feature films had been produced in the 70mm Grandeur format, including the Fox MovieTone Follies of 1929, Happy Days, Song o' My Heart, and the final spectacular $2 Million US dollar Fox Grandeur film, The Big Trail (Oct 1930), featuring 23 year old Marion Mitchell Morrison using his screen name of John Wayne for the first time, in his first starring role. MGM produced two features; their renamed "Realife" productions of Billy The Kid 1930, and The Great Meadow, released in 1931. The Big Trail was the final Grandeur film of Fox Studios, as the format was not used by Fox afterwards. The failure of the large studios to agree upon a widescreen format, and due mostly to the financial problems caused by the Great Depression, along with the costs of upgrading theaters to widescreen that were not yet upgraded from silent to sound, spelled the end of widescreen until more than 20 years later when nearly all of the original Mitchell FC Grandeur cameras were sought out to be retooled and modified in the 1950s to become cameras such as the 65mm Todd-AO, MGM 65, Ultra Panavision 70 cameras, etc. Only two of the original Mitchell FC 70mm Fox Grandeur cameras, both from the 1929/1930 70mm Fox Grandeur widescreen attempt, are still known to exist in original and unmodified condition, camera serial numbers FC-2 and FC-8, as these two cameras somehow ended up in the military in the 1940s. Later versions of this 70mm camera were also supplied to the US military in the 1930s, 1940s, and 1950s.
- Mitchell GC - Introduced for the military in 1940, and based on the Standard 35mm Studio model, but without the studio special effects options, the GC is a high-speed camera system, able to run at variable speeds up to 128 frames per second.
- Mitchell NC/BNC ("Newsreel Camera"/"Blimped Newsreel Camera") - Improved model designed to run quietly for production sound-shooting, introduced in 1932. This camera became the de facto standard for Hollywood production for the greater part of the 20th century. Mitchell NC and BNC camera heads became "donors" for Cinema Products Corporation XR35 cameras, which incorporated many of CP's improvements to the basic Mitchell production sound camera, and which were formerly available as separate features from Cinema Products Corp. Three Mitchell BNC cameras were employed by Desilu Productions in the groundbreaking multiple-camera setup used to film its CBS-TV situation comedy I Love Lucy.
- Mitchell SS - Single-system camera - Used mainly by the U.S. Army Signal Corps units during WW-II; was a highly modified NC which included an RCA optical sound recording galvanometer and a "sound translation point" which was separate from the camera's main film drive sprocket.
- Mitchell VistaVision camera - Production camera for sound shooting using Paramount's VistaVision process (The Ten Commandments, 1956 and later). Earlier VistaVision productions used converted Stein and/or converted Technicolor three-strip cameras. VistaVision was used by George Lucas in Star Wars for its larger negative while avoiding costly 65mm special-effects shots.
- Second Generation Mitchell 65mm FC/BFC ("Fox Camera"/"Blimped Fox Camera") - Not to be confused with the original 1929 first generation Mitchell FC Fox 70mm Grandeur cameras, this is an updated 65mm version of the original Fox Grandeur FC, with improvements adapted from the 35mm NC and BNC. It was introduced with the improved Todd-AO system (South Pacific, 1957, and later).
- Mitchell R35 camera - a pin-registered, hand-holdable and tripod-mountable reflex 35mm camera with multiple magazine mounting positions and an available sound blimp. Proprietary R35 lens mount. Succeeded by the R35R (industry-standard BNCR mount) and the R35RC (BNCR mount and crystal-controlled motor).
- Mitchell NCR/BNCR camera - Reflex version of NC/BNC
- Mitchell 16 camera - a pin-registered 16mm camera with the versatility of the Standard, and the high speed of the GC
- Mitchell R16 camera - a pin-registered reflex 16mm camera which was relatively silent and was available in double-system (Model R16DS) and single-system (Model R16SS) models for newsgathering and newsfilm production. This relatively expensive model found use mainly with CBS's 60 Minutes. The single-system model incorporated a Davis (tight) Loop drive system, unique in all single-system production cameras. The double-system model simply eliminated the Davis (tight) Loop drive system, and the lower sprocket, thereby reducing the complexity of the internal gearing and lowering the camera's acoustic noise level.
- Mitchell Tripod - Wood base tripod introduced about 1920, this tripod was manufactured and sold by Mitchell until the 1970s with very little change, other than the addition of a "Baby" shorter version introduced in 1928.
- Mitchell Hand Cranked Pan/Tilt Head - Introduced with the above wood tripod about 1920, and known through the 1920s as the Mitchell Standard Tripod Head.
- Mitchell Friction Pan/Tilt Head - By August of 1920, George Mitchell had invented the Friction Head, and filed for patent by 1921. Taking time to perfect it, the well known Friction Pan/Tilt Head was introduced in 1928. The Friction Head very quickly became the standard professional motion picture camera pan/tilt tripod head, replacing earlier hand-cranked types.
- Mitchell Panoramic Friction-Tilt Stills Camera Head and Tripod - Sometime during the 1920s, apparently between 1921 and 1928, George Mitchell also created and marketed a lightweight two-stage tripod with a tilting head that was especially created for the cinema photo-stills photographers. The camera support head featured a multiple plate friction controlled 90 degree tilt mechanism, sight levels on both the base platform and the tilt platform of the head, and featured enclosed and under-glass 360 degree graduated panoramic charts for both the base and the tilt platforms. The bottom stage legs of the adjustable height tripod are reversible, allowing for a choice of either rubber feet or ground spikes.

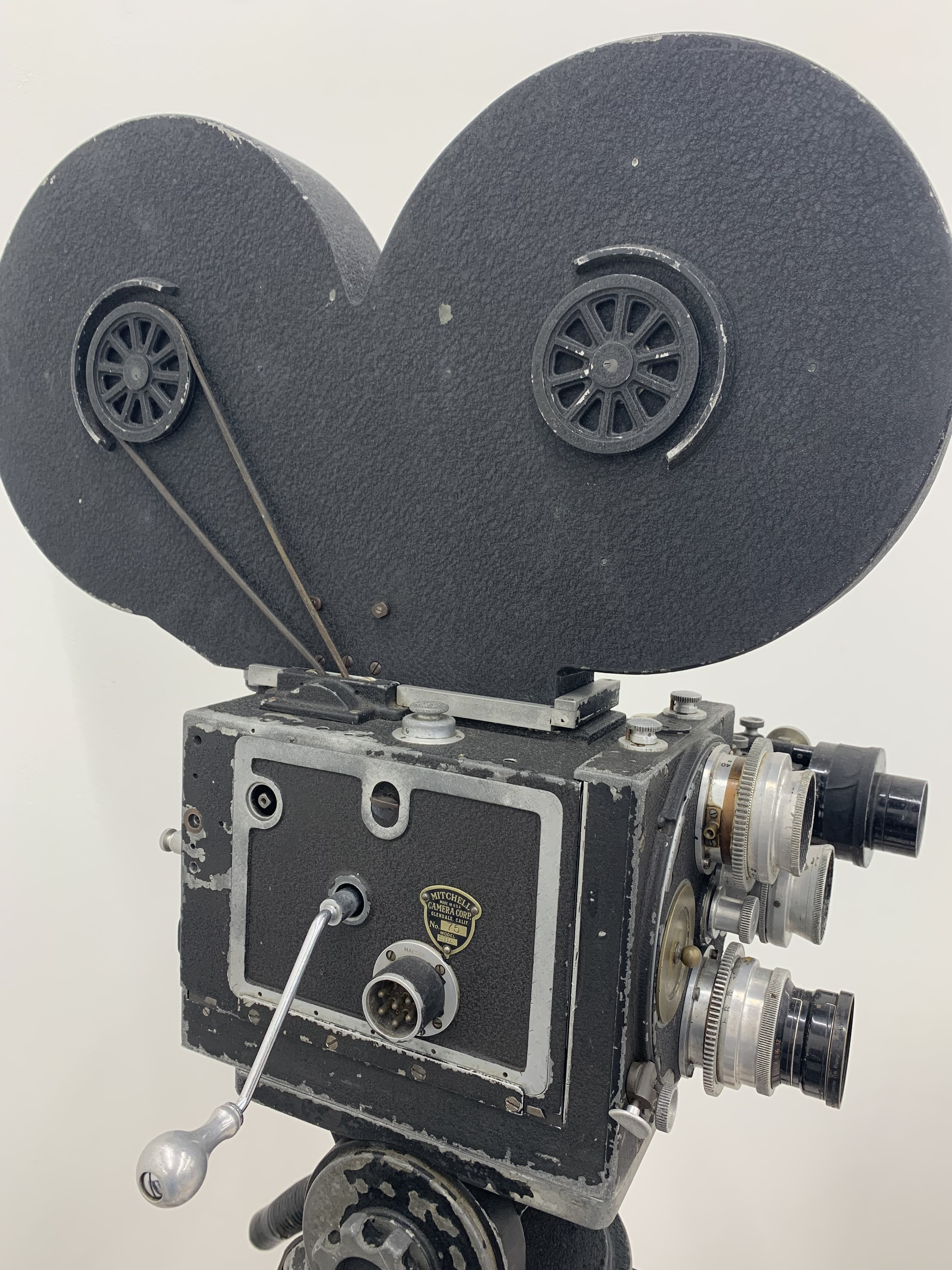
Mitchell studio camera (c.1930s) with hand crank, take-up drive belt and "Mickey Mouse ears" film magazine

=== Derivatives ===
Newall NC - In 1944, unable to purchase Mitchell cameras in Pounds Sterling, the Rank Organisation in the UK exploited a loophole (the Mitchell company had failed to register a patent in the UK for the NC) and had the Newall company produce 200 cameras known as the Newall NC. In arrangement with Technicolor, 20 Newall cameras were modified to use bi-pack film (with double magazines) to film the 1948 Olympic Games in color, though with a limited palette. The process was known as Technichrome. The resulting film used sequences filmed in three-strip Technicolor, Technichrome, and Technicolor Monopack, the latter also filmed with a Newall NC.

Certain models were copied in whole or in part by the U.S.S.R., mostly models which were intended for filming animation or special effects process plates, or for high-speed filming. In a few cases, the U.S.S.R. added spinning mirror-shutter reflex focusing and viewing, thereby deleting the Mitchell-designed rackover focusing mechanism and the Mitchell-designed side viewer.

Though the Eastern Bloc standard for camera film is Kodak Standard perforations, that standard was rejected by the very Bloc which proposed it. U.S.S.R. professional cameras consequently require film stocks that are incompatible with Western Bloc camera film, which always uses Bell & Howell perforations.

Eastern Bloc (KS) camera film will pass undamaged through a Western Bloc (BH) professional camera, but the images will not be registered accurately. Conversely, Western Bloc (BH) camera film will not pass undamaged through a U.S.S.R. professional camera (KS), as the perforations used for registration will be damaged.

16mm and 65/70mm films were standardized late in the standardization cycle so these U.S.S.R. cameras in these gauges are indeed compatible with Western Bloc camera films.

== Legacy ==
Production (sound) models in 16mm, 35mm (4- and 2-perf) and 65mm (5-perf) served as a basis for early Panavision cameras in those gauges.

== Literature ==
- Ira B. Hoke: "Mitchell Camera Nears Majority". In: American Cinematographer, December 1938, page 495 f.
- L. Sprague Anderson: "Mitchell, the Standard". In: Society of Camera Operators Magazine. www.soc.org/magazine.html
