= C-Day =

Name used for two different one-off events related to television in different countries

C-Day is the name of two television-related events: 1 March 1975, when Australia moved to regular colour television, and 1 July 2000, the day the UK television industry began accepting only widescreen commercials, an important step in the general move of broadcasting in the UK to the picture format.

== Colour television in Australia ==
Australia was somewhat late in introducing colour television, to choose the correct television system, waiting about 8 years from the time PAL was invented.

It was then forbidden for broadcasters to transmit the chroma burst signal, until the designated day, 1 March 1975. The broadcasters were allowed to experiment with transmitting colour signals in the picture area, and get their transmission up and running while people who had already bought colour TV sets could only watch the shows in black and white. There were some people who built a circuit to circumvent this, where they would synchronise the chrominance decoding oscillator manually.

== Commercials-Day in the UK ==
C-Day or Commercials-Day, 1 July 2000, was the date at which UK broadcasters (with the exception of MTV and VH1) changed from requiring 4:3 aspect ratio commercials, to requiring 16:9 Full Height commercials supplied to them, shot "14:9 safe" for those channels which in part (i.e. the analogue feeds of terrestrial broadcasters) or in whole (many cable television and satellite television channels) continued to broadcast a 4:3 frame.

It was originally proposed by ITV in July 1999.

ITV and Channel 4 took advantage of C-Day to update their continuity suites to be widescreen capable, broadcasting their idents in widescreen.
