= List of 70 mm films =

The following movies were filmed using 65mm or 70mm negative stock. Titles are followed by the photographic process(es) employed.

Releases produced in Todd-AO, Todd-70, Super Panavision 70 (also known as Panavision 70), Panavision System 65 (also known as Panavision Super 70), Dimension 150, Arri 765 and Superpanorama 70 (also known as MClS 70 and MCS Superpanorama 70) were photographed with spherical optics on 65 mm film with five perforations per frame, yielding an aspect ratio of 2.20:1.

Sovscope 70 and DEFA 70 releases were identical with the exception that they were photographed on 70 mm negative stock.

MGM Camera 65 (later renamed to Ultra Panavision 70) releases employed the same film format, but the use of 1.25X anamorphic optics yielded a super-wide aspect ratio of approximately 2.75:1.

70 mm Cinerama releases were projected with special optics onto a deeply curved screen in an attempt to mimic the effect of the original 3-strip Cinerama process.

Hi Fi Stereo 70 (also known as Triarama and Stereovision 70) was a 3-D process. Two anamorphic images, one for each eye, were captured side by side on 65 mm film. A special lens on a 70 mm projector added polarization and merged the two images on the screen. A similar Soviet system known as Stereo 70 did not employ anamorphics, resulting in an aspect ratio of 1.37:1.

Stereospace 2000 (a 3D process) and Kodak-Disney 3D used dual 65 mm cameras operating at 30fps.

Standard 70 mm theater prints were 70 mm wide, with the extra space used to accommodate the 6-channel magnetic soundtracks, consisting of five full-range channels (left, left-center, center, right-center and right) arrayed behind the screen, with the sixth channel providing surround effects.

Far and Away (1992), Baraka (1992) and Hamlet (1996) employed a modified arrangement of speakers, with left, centre and right channels behind the screen, left and right surround channels and a low-frequency effects channel. More recent 70 mm releases (including The Hateful Eight) have used standard 5.1 DTS sound.

This list does not include any of the hundreds of 35 mm films which have been optically enlarged to 70 mm for deluxe exhibition, including such titles as Star Wars, Raiders of the Lost Ark, and Ghostbusters.

Also not included are 70 mm releases which originated on horizontal 35 mm negative such as Vistavision and Technirama (see List of Technirama films), nor films made in the Showscan process. For films shot in the IMAX 70mm format, see List of IMAX films.

== American 65/70 mm films ==
- Oklahoma! (1955) – Todd-AO @ 30 frame/s; this production also shot in 35 mm CinemaScope @ 24 frame/s
- Around the World in 80 Days (1956) – Todd-AO; shot twice, with cameras running at 30 and 24 frame/s, respectively
- Raintree County (1957) – MGM Camera 65; exhibited only in 35 mm CinemaScope since all the 70 mm cinemas were booked
- South Pacific (1958) – Todd-AO
- Ben-Hur (1959) – MGM Camera 65
- Porgy and Bess (1959) – Todd-AO
- The Big Fisherman (1959) – Super Panavision 70
- Scent of Mystery (1960) – Todd-70 and Smell-O-Vision. Todd-Belock 8-channel Sound, which used a control signal to "steer" the single surround channel to three surround tracks (right wall, left wall and rear wall). This title was later re-edited, optically converted to 3-strip Cinemiracle and re-released without the odors as Holiday in Spain in 1961. It was exhibited in both Cinerama and Cinemiracle.
- Can-Can (1960) – Todd-AO
- The Alamo (1960) – Todd-AO
- Exodus (1960) – Super Panavision 70
- West Side Story (1961) – Panavision 70
- Mutiny on the Bounty (1962) – Ultra Panavision 70
- It's a Mad, Mad, Mad, Mad World (1963) – Ultra Panavision 70; shown in 70 mm Cinerama
- Cleopatra (1963) – Todd-AO (shooting started in CinemaScope, changed to 3-panel Cinerama and finally to Todd-AO. The anamorphic and 3-panel footage was discarded.)
- The Fall of the Roman Empire (1964) – Ultra Panavision 70
- My Fair Lady (1964) – Super Panavision 70
- Cheyenne Autumn (1964) – Super Panavision 70
- The Sound of Music (1965) – Todd-AO (second unit photography [aerial shots] in Superpanorama 70)
- Those Magnificent Men in Their Flying Machines (1965) – Todd-AO (some scenes in Superpanorama 70)
- The Agony and the Ecstasy (1965) – Todd-AO
- The Greatest Story Ever Told (1965) – Ultra Panavision 70; shown in 70 mm Cinerama
- The Hallelujah Trail (1965) – Ultra Panavision 70; shown in 70 mm Cinerama
- Battle of the Bulge (1965) – Ultra Panavision 70; shown in 70 mm Cinerama
- Lord Jim (1965) – Super Panavision 70
- Khartoum (1966) – Ultra Panavision 70; shown in 70 mm Cinerama
- Grand Prix (1966) – Super Panavision 70 (some scenes in Superpanorama 70); shown in 70 mm Cinerama
- The Bible: In The Beginning (1966) – Dimension 150 (credited as D-150)
- Doctor Dolittle (1967) – Todd-AO
- 2001: A Space Odyssey (1968) – Super Panavision 70; some shots in Todd-AO; aerial shots from the stargate sequence in Superpanorama 70. Shown in 70 mm Cinerama
- Ice Station Zebra (1968) – Super Panavision 70 (shooting started in Ultra Panavision 70 then switched to Super Panavision 70); shown in 70 mm Cinerama
- Star! (1968) – Todd-AO
- Hello, Dolly! (1969) – Todd-AO
- Krakatoa, East of Java (1969) – Todd-AO and Super Panavision 70 shown in 70 mm Cinerama
- Airport (1970) – Todd-AO
- Patton (1970) – Dimension 150
- Song of Norway (1970) – Super Panavision 70, shown in 70 mm Cinerama, advertised as "On the Cinerama screen" in some countries
- The Last Valley (1970) – Todd-AO (made for 70 mm Cinerama, but never shown in that format)
- Tron (1982) – Super Panavision 70. Live-action all filmed in color 65mm; CGI sequences filmed in 65mm B&W and composited to a VistaVision intermediate then optically printed back to 70mm IP.
- Far and Away (1992) – Panavision System 65; segments in Arri 765 and VistaVision
- Baraka (1992) – Todd-AO, documentary
- Hamlet (1996) – Panavision System 65; segments in Arri 765
- Samsara (2011) – Panavision System 65, documentary (no 70mm prints produced)
- The Hateful Eight (2015) - Ultra Panavision 70 (the first 70mm Cinerama release since 1970)
- The Odyssey (2026) – IMAX Keighley and IMAX MSM 9802; Panavision Sphero 65 and Hasselblad Lenses; first movie to be shot entirely with IMAX cameras

== Other countries ==
- Lawrence of Arabia (United Kingdom 1962) – Super Panavision 70
- Flying Clipper – Traumreise unter weissen Segeln (West Germany 1962) – Superpanorama 70. A re-edited version was shown as Mediterranean Holiday (1964) in 70 mm Cinerama and in Wonderama in the USA
- Shéhérazade (France/Spain/Italy 1963) – Superpanorama 70
- La Tulipe noire/The Black Tulip (France/Italy/Spain 1964) – Superpanorama 70; shown in 70 mm Cinerama
- Old Shatterhand (West Germany/Yugoslavia/France/Italy 1964) – Superpanorama 70
- Uncle Tom's Cabin/Onkel Toms Hütte /La Case de l'Oncle Tom (France/Italy/West Germany/Yugoslavia 1965) – Superpanorama 70
- Congress of Love/Der Kongress amüsiert sich/Le Congrès s'amuse (West Germany/Austria/France 1966) – Superpanorama 70
- Dr. Coppelius/El Fantástico Mundo del Dr Coppelius (Spain/US 1966) – Superpanorama 70
- Savage Pampas/Pampa Salvaje (Spain/Argentina/US 1966) – Superpanorama 70
- Play Time (France 1967) – filmed with 65 mm Mitchell cameras, with an aperture masked for a non-standard aspect ratio of approximately 1.7:1
- Con la muerte a la espalda/With Death On Your Back (Spain/France/Italy 1967) – Hi-Fi Stereo 70
- La Marca del Hombre Lobo (Spain 1968) – Hi Fi Stereo 70. Re-edited with new footage and released in the US in 35 mm 3D as Frankenstein's Bloody Terror.
- Chitty Chitty Bang Bang (United Kingdom & USA 1968) – Super Panavision 70
- Ryan's Daughter (United Kingdom 1970) – Super Panavision 70
- Liebe in drei Dimensionen/Love in 3D (West Germany 1973) – Triarama
- Akira (Japan 1988) - Animated in 1.85:1 and photographed in 65mm.
- Map of the Human Heart (Australia/United Kingdom 1993) – Panavision System 65. Released in 35mm only.
- As Wonderland Goes By (Australia/Bulgaria 2012) - Panavision System 65
- Death on the Nile (United Kingdom & USA 2022) - Panavision System 65

== 70mm releases from 3-strip negative ==
- To Be Alive! (1964) converted from 3 x 35mm to Ultra Panavision
- Cinerama's Russian Adventure (1966) optically converted from Kinopanorama to 70 mm Cinerama
- This Is Cinerama (1972) – optically converted from Cinerama to 70 mm Cinerama

== List of Short Subjects ==
- The Miracle of Todd-AO (USA 1956) – Todd-AO @ 30 frame/s
- The March of Todd-AO (USA 1958) – Todd-AO
- The Tale of Old Whiff (USA 1960) – Todd-70 and Smell-O-Vision. Released with Scent of Mystery. Todd-Belock 8-channel Sound, which used a control signal to "steer" the single surround channel to three surround tracks (right wall, left wall and rear wall).
- Man in the 5th Dimension (USA 1964) – Todd-AO. Shown at NYC World's Fair.
- Fortress of Peace (Switzerland 1964) – Superpanorama 70
- The Artist Who Did Not Want To Paint (USA 1964) – Todd-AO. Prologue to The Agony and the Ecstasy.
- Delifini prikhodyat k lyudyam/Dolphins Come to the People (Soviet 1966) – Kinopanorama 70. 20m short, optically converted to 3-strip Kinopanorama.
- Defa 70 (East Germany 1967) – DEFA-70 demo film
- Sky over Holland (Netherlands 1967) – Superpanorama 70
- A Place to Stand (Canada 1967). Produced for the Ontario Pavilion at Expo 67 in Montreal. Winner of the Best Live Action Short Subject Oscar at the 1968 Academy Awards.
- Multiple Man (Canada 1968)
- Where the North Begins (Canada 1971)
- Festival (Canada 1971)
- Seasons of the Mind (Canada 1971)
- Probes in Space (1975) – Todd-AO. The camera was fitted with the fisheye lens used for Cinerama 360.
- Auto-E-Motion (1984) – Super Panavision 70. BMW promotional film.
- Cinespace 70 by Todd-AO (USA 1989) – Cinespace 70. A demo film to showcase the merits of filming using Todd-AO's new Cinespace 70 cameras. The negative specifications were identical to Todd-AO but the frame rate was increased to 30fps.
- Warriors of the Wasteland (USA 1989) - Super Panavision 70 (65mm camera negative was frame scanned at 4k and restored in 2014)
- Året gjennom Børfjord/A Year Along the Abandoned Road (Norway 1991) – Super Panavision 70
- Dead Sea (USA 1992) – Panavision System 65 (65mm camera negative was frame scanned at 4k and restored in 2014)
- Tour Eiffel (Germany 1994) – Arri 765
- Svalbard - Arctic Seasons (Norway 1995) – Filmed with Mitchell 65mm cameras (HKB 65/70)
- Le mariage de Fanny/Fanny's Wedding (France 2000) – Superpanorama 70
- The Testaments of One Fold and One Shepherd (USA 2000) – Arri 765 (some scenes in Panavision System 65)
- Tanakh bibelen al-quran (Norway 2007) – Superpanorama 70
- Daughter of Dismay (Austria 2019) – Mitchell 8/65 camera
- Forever...Forever (Austria/France 2026) – VistaRama65 / 27 perforation time-lapse camera for 70mm/5p reduction prints

== Partial list of Special Venue Films ==
- Journey to the Stars (1962) – Cinerama 360 (a 10/70 dome system using a circular image). 24fps. Shown at the Seattle World's Fair.
- To the Moon and Beyond (1964) – Cinerama 360 (a 10/70 dome system using a circular image). 18fps. Shown in the Transportation and Travel Pavilion at the New York World's Fair. Later reduced to 35mm, renamed Cosmos and shown in a traveling inflatable theater.
- Motion (Canada 1967) – Superpanorama 70
- Harmony: Nature and Man (1969) – Dimension 150. Shown in the Washington State Pavilion at the 1970 Osaka World's Fair.
- Voyage to the Outer Planets (1973) – A multimedia presentation which included sequences filmed in standard 65mm and in Dynavision (8/70 negative using a modified Todd-AO camera, blown up to OMNIMAX).
- The Circus (1973) – Todd-AO. Shot with the camera on its side and projected onto a tall narrow screen.
- Cosmos (aka Cosmos: The Universe of Loren Eisley) (1974) – Dynavision (8/70 negative using a modified Todd-AO camera, blown up to OMNIMAX). Shown at the Reuben H. Fleet Science Center in San Diego.
- Alaska The Great Land (1981) – 70mm Omnivision (8 perf); Alaska Experience Theatre
- Symbiosis (1982) – Super Panavision 70 at 30fps. Disney Epcot short subject. Employed an unusual 12-channel sound system designed for the special theater in which it was shown.
- Magic Journeys (1982) – Kodak-Disney 3D
- Hawaii Island of the Gods (1984) – 70mm Omnivision (8 perf); Hawaii Experience Theatre.
- Water, The Source of Life (1984) – Stereospace 2000. Made for the United States Pavilion at the 1984 World's Fair in New Orleans.
- Earth Song - Erika's Dream (1985) – Stereospace 2000. Made for the 3D Fantasium exhibit of the Sumitomo Pavilion at Expo '85 in Tsukuba, Japan.
- Captain EO (1986) – Kodak-Disney 3D
- Norway – The Film (1989) – Super Panavision 70. Epcot short subject.
- Muppet*Vision 3D (1991) – Dual camera 70mm 3D.
- Honey, I Shrunk the Audience! (1994) – Kodak-Disney 3D
- T2 3D: Battle Across Time (1996) – 3 x dual camera 65mm 3D @ 30fps
- The Witness (1997) – Arri 765 (some scenes in Panavision System 65); shown at Mashantucket Pequot Museum
- It's Tough to Be a Bug! (1998) – Dual camera 70mm 3D.
- 100% (1999) – Arri 765. 10-minute short shown in a transportable theatre at NASCAR races.

== Films partially shot in 65 mm ==
- How the West Was Won (1962) – Ultra Panavision 70 (some action scenes and shots requiring rear projection, optically converted to 3 strip Cinerama through special printer. The bulk was shot in 3 strip Cinerama.)
- Az aranyfej/The Golden Head (1965) – Chase sequence filmed in Superpanorama 70; the bulk was shot in Super Technirama 70. Shown in 70 mm Cinerama.
- Mackenna's Gold (1969) – Super Panavision 70
- The Horsemen (1971) – Super Panavision 70
- Close Encounters of the Third Kind (1977) – Super Panavision 70 - special effects shots only. (Early promotional material erroneously suggested that the entire film was produced in Super Panavision 70.)
- Star Trek: The Motion Picture (1979) – special effects shots only
- The Empire Strikes Back (1980) – selected special effects work
- Blade Runner (1982) – special effects shots only
- Brainstorm (1983) – Super Panavision 70. Virtual reality sequences only.
- Ghostbusters (1984) – special effects shots only
- 2010 (1984) - Special effects shots only.
- Masters of the Universe (1987) – special effects shots only
- Die Hard (1988) – special effects shots only
- The Judas Project (1990) – special effects shots only
- Alien 3 (1992) – Panavision System 65. Special effects shots only.
- Little Buddha (1993) – Arri 765, Buddha flashback scenes only
- Contact (1997) – background plates
- Panic Room (2002) – opening title sequence.
- Spider-Man 2 (2004) – selected special effects shots only
- The New World (2005) – Panavision System 65. "Hyper-reality" scenes only.
- The Prestige (2006) – Panavision System 65. Selected wide shots only.
- Sunshine (2007) – Arri 765; "Earth Room" scene only
- The Dark Knight (2008) - selected scenes
- The International (2009) – Arri 765; selected scenes
- Stephen Hawking's Beyond the Horizon (2009) – Arri 765; dialogue scenes only
- Shutter Island (2010) - Arri 765 and Panavision System 65; certain flashback scenes
- Inception (2010) – Panavision System 65; selected scenes
- Unknown (2011) - Arri 765; selected scenes
- The Tree of Life (2011) - Panavision System 65; selected scenes
- Snow White & the Huntsman (2012) - Panavision System 65; selected wide shots and second unit work
- The Dark Knight Rises (2012) - Panavision System 65; selected scenes
- To the Wonder (2012) - selected scenes
- The Master (2012) - Panavision System 65 (approximately 85% of the film)
- Gravity (2013) - Arri 765; final scene
- Jurassic World (2015) - Panavision System 65; select scenes
- Batman v Superman: Dawn of Justice (2016) - Panavision System 65; select scenes
- Dunkirk (2017) - Panavision System 65 (non-IMAX scenes)
- Murder on the Orient Express (2017) - Panavision System 65
- Christopher Robin (2018) - Panavision System 65 and Ultra Panavision 70; select scenes
- The Nutcracker and the Four Realms (2018) - Panavision System 65
- The Death and Life of John F. Donovan (2018) - selected scenes
- Apollo 11 (2019) - Todd-AO, documentary
- Tenet (2020) - Panavision System 65 (non-IMAX scenes)
- No Time to Die (2021) - Arri 765 and Panavision System 65; some scenes
- Nope (2022) - Panavision System 65 (non-IMAX scenes)
- White Noise (2022) - Arri 765; some scenes
- Oppenheimer (2023) - Panavision System 65 (non-IMAX scenes)
- Sinners (2025) - Ultra Panavision 70 (non-IMAX scenes)

== Soviet Bloc 70mm films ==
- Povesti Plamennikh Let/Chronicle of Flaming Years (Soviet 1961) – erroneously credited as Todd-AO by some sources but shot with Soviet 70mm cameras. Optically converted to 3-strip Kinopanorama.
- Sud sumasschedshikh/The Trial of Madmen/Judgment of Fools/Judgment of the Mad (Soviet 1961 or 1962) – Sovscope 70. Optically converted to 3-strip Kinopanorama.
- Batmanova, Singing Slave (Soviet 1962) – Kinopanorama 70. Optically converted to 3-strip Kinopanorama.
- Zakon Antarktidy/The Law of the Antarctic (Soviet 1963) – Sovscope 70. Optically converted to 3-strip Kinopanorama.
- Krepostnaya Aktrisa/Serf Actress (Soviet 1963) – Sovscope 70
- Na podvodnikh skuterakh/On Submarine Scooters (Soviet 1963) – Kinopanorama 70. Optically converted to 3-strip Kinopanorama.
- An Optimistic Tragedy (Soviet 1963) – Sovscope 70. Optically converted to 3-strip Kinopanorama.
- Kosmicheskiy Splav/Cosmic Alloy/Space Alloy (Soviet 1964) – Sovscope 70
- The Blizzard (Soviet 1964) - Sovscope 70
- The Enchanted Desna (Soviet 1964) – Sovscope 70
- Sekret Uspekha/Bolshoi Ballet 67/The Secret of Success (Soviet 1964) – Sovscope 70. Optically converted to 3-strip Kinopanorama.
- SON/The Dream (Soviet 1964) – Sovscope 70
- Spyashchaya krasavitsa/The Sleeping Beauty (Soviet 1964) – Sovscope 70. Optically converted to 3-strip Kinopanorama.
- Geroy nashego vremeni/Hero of Our Time (Soviet 1965) - Sovscope 70
- God kak zhizn/A Lifetime in One Year/Year as Long as Life (Soviet 1965) – Sovscope 70
- Zalp Avrory/The Salvos of the Aurora Cruiser (Soviet 1965) - Sovscope 70
- My, Russkiy Narod/We, The Russian People/We Are Russian People (Soviet 1965) – Sovscope 70
- Yarost/Fury (Soviet 1966) – Sovscope 70
- Aybolit-66 (Soviet 1966) - Sovscope 70
- Katerina Izmailova (Soviet 1966) - Sovscope 70
- Korolevskaya regata (Soviet 1966) - Sovscope 70
- Net i da/No and Yes (Soviet 1966) - Stereo 70 (3D)
- The Tale of Tsar Saltan (Soviet 1966) - Sovscope 70
- Tretya molodost/La nuit des adieux/Nights of Farewell (Soviet/France 1966) - Sovscope 70
- Three Fat Men (Soviet 1966) - Sovscope 70
- Anna Karenina (Soviet 1967) - Sovscope 70
- Arena (Soviet 1967) - Sovscope 70
- Bereg Nadezhdy/The Riverside of Hope/Riverbank of Hope/Hope Coast/Coast of Hope (Soviet 1967) - Sovscope 70
- Buryan/Weeds/Tall Weeds (Soviet 1967) - Sovscope 70
- Torrents of Steel (Soviet 1967) - Sovscope 70
- Nezabyvayemoye/The Unforgettable (Soviet 1967) - Sovscope 70
- Wedding in Malinovka (Soviet 1967) - Sovscope 70
- Tumannost Andromedy/Andromeda Nebula (Soviet 1967) - Sovscope 70
- Vecher nakanune Ivana Kupala/Vechir na Ivana Kupala/The Eve of Ivan Kupalo/Night of the Ivan Kupala/Feast of St. John the Baptist (Soviet 1968) - Sovscope 70
- Daleko na zapade/Far on the West/Far in the West (Soviet 1968) - Sovscope 70
- Dnevnye zvyozdy/The Stars of the Day (Soviet 1966) - Sovscope 70
- War and Peace (Soviet 1966-67) – Sovscope 70
- Hauptmann Florian von der Mühle (East Germany 1968) – DEFA-70
- Ludi Na Nile/Al-nass wal Nil/Those People of the Nile (Soviet/Egypt 1968, released 1972) - Sovscope 70
- Oni zhivut ryadom/They Live Near Us/They Live Nearby (Soviet 1968) - Sovscope 70
- Pervorossiyanye/First Russians (Soviet 1968) - Sovscope 70
- Tainstvennyy monakh/The Mysterious Monk (Soviet 1968) - Stereo 70 (3D)
- Tchaikovsky (Soviet 1969) - Sovscope 70
- Goluboy lyod/Blue Ice (Soviet 1969) - Sovscope 70
- Direktor (Soviet 1969) - Sovscope 70
- Duma o Britanke/Duma pro Britanku/Reflections on Britanka/Thought About the Britanka (Soviet 1969) - Sovscope 70
- Du bist min – Ein deutsches Tagebuch (East Germany 1969) – DEFA-70
- Korol gor i drugie/King of the Mountains and All Others/The King of Mountains and Others (Soviet 1969) - Sovscope 70
- Osvobozhdenie/Liberation (Soviet\East Germany\Poland\Italy 1969-71) - Sovscope 70
- Pochtovyy roman/Romance by Mail/A Postal Romance/Love by Correspondence (Soviet 1969) - Sovscope 70
- Syuzhet dlya nebolshogo rasskaza/Subject for a Short Story/A Plot for a Short Story (The Loves of Tchekhov)/Lika, Chekov's Love/Lika - Lyubov Chekhova (Soviet 1969) - Sovscope 70
- The Flight (Soviet 1970) - Sovscope 70
- Signale – Ein Weltraumabenteuer/Signals: A Space Adventure/Sygnały MMXX (Link to German Wikipedia) (East Germany/Poland 1970) – DEFA-70
- Wladimir Iljitsch Uljanow – Lenin (East Germany 1970) – DEFA-70
- Korol manezha/King of the Arena/The King of an Arena (Soviet 1970) - Sovscope 70
- Krushenie Imperii/The Downfall of the Empire/Empire Falling (Soviet 1970) - Sovscope 70
- Lyubov Yarovaya (Soviet 1970) - Sovscope 70
- More v ogne/Sea in Fire/The Sea On Fire/Sea in Flame (Soviet 1970) - Sovscope 70
- Chermeni/Chermain/Chermen the Hero (Soviet 1970) - Sovscope 70
- Goya or the Hard Way to Enlightenment (East Germany/Soviet 1971) – DEFA-70 (partly shot in Sovscope 70)
- KLK AN PTX – Die rote Kapelle/KLK Calling PTZ: The Red Orchestra (East Germany 1971) – DEFA-70
- Bilyy ptakh z chornoyu vidznakoyu/The White Bird Marked with Black/White Bird with Black Markings/White Bird with a Black Mark/White Bird with a Black Spot/The White Bird with the Black Mark (Soviet 1971) - Sovscope 70
- Zakhar Berkut (Soviet 1971) - Sovscope 70
- Zvezdy Ne Gasnut/Zvyozdy ne gasnut/Stars Never Go Off/Stars Do Not Die Away/Stars Do Not Go Down (Soviet 1971) - Sovscope 70
- Sever, yug, vostok, zapad (Vsegda Nacheku)/North, South, East, West/Always on the Alert (North, South, East, West) (Soviet 1971) - Sovscope 70
- Molodye/Young People/The Young Ones/The Young Generation (Soviet 1971) - Sovscope 70
- Russkoye pole/Russian Field (Soviet 1971) - Sovscope 70
- Tsena bystrykh sekund/The Price of Fast Seconds/The Price of the Fastest Seconds (Soviet 1971) - Sovscope 70
- Blokada/Blockade (Soviet 1974-77) - Sovscope 70
- Vizit vezhlivosti/Courtesy Call/The Courtesy Visit/Visit of Courtesy (Soviet 1972) - Sovscope 70
- Vsadnik bez golovy/The Headless Rider/The Headless Horseman (Soviet 1972) - Sovscope 70
- Hot Snow/Goryachi Sneg (Soviet 1972) - Sovscope 70
- Gonshchiki/Racers (Soviet 1972) - Sovscope 70
- Eolomea (East Germany 1972) – DEFA-70
- Lützower (East Germany 1972) – DEFA-70
- Sestra Muzykanta/Sister of a Musician/The Musician's Sister (Soviet 1972) - Sovscope 70
- Sibiryachka/The Siberian Woman/The Girl from Siberia (Soviet 1972) - Sovscope 70
- Tolko ty/Only You (Soviet 1972) - Sovscope 70
- Vozvrata net/No Return/Point of No Return (Soviet 1973) - Sovscope 70
- Vysokoye zvaniye/Vysokoe zvanie. Dilogiya: Film pervyy. Ya - Shapovalov T.P./High Title/The High Rank (Soviet 1973-74) - Sovscope 70
- Goroda i gody/Towns and Years/The Cities and the Years/Cities and Times (Soviet 1973) - Sovscope 70
- Much Ado About Nothing (Soviet 1973) - Sovscope 70
- Orpheus in der Unterwelt/Orpheus in the Underworld (East Germany 1974) – DEFA-70
- Avtomobil, skripka i sobaka Klyaksa/Car, Violin and Blot the Dog/A Car, a Violin and a Dog-Spot/The Car, the Violin, and Blot the Dog/The Car, violin and a dog the Blot/Automobile, Violin, and the Dog Blob (Soviet 1974) - Sovscope 70
- Romans o vlyublyonnykh/A Lover's Romance/Romance of Lovers/Romance for Lovers/The Lovers' Romance (Soviet 1974) - Sovscope 70
- Samyy zharkiy mesyats/The Warmest Month/The Hottest Month (Soviet 1974) - Sovscope 70
- Belyy bashlyk/White Headscarf (Soviet 1975) - Sovscope 70
- Dersu Uzala (Soviet 1975) – Sovscope 70
- Vozdukhoplavatel/The Balloonist/The Air Traveler/The Aeronaut/An Aeronaut (Soviet 1975) - Sovscope 70
- Ot zari do zari/From Dawn Till Sunset/From Dawn to Dusk (Soviet 1975) - Sovscope 70
- Semya Ivanovykh/The Ivanov Family/The Ivanovs (Soviet 1975) - Sovscope 70
- Gypsies Are Found Near Heaven (Soviet 1975) - Sovscope 70
- Kafe 'Izotop'/Cafe "Isotope"/Cafe "Isotop" (Soviet 1976) - Sovscope 70
- Teatr Neizvestnogo Aktera/Povest o neizvestnom aktyore/Story of an Unknown Actor/The Theater of an Unknown Actor/Theatre of the Unknown Actor (Soviet 1976) - Sovscope 70
- Vooruzhyon i ochen opasen/Armed and Very Dangerous/Armed and Dangerous: Time and Heroes of Bret Harte (Soviet 1977) - Sovscope 70
- Incognito from St. Petersburg (Soviet 1977) - Sovscope 70
- Pravo na lyubov/The Right to Love (Soviet 1977) - Sovscope 70
- Soldaty Svobody/Soldiers of Freedom/Soldiers of Liberty (Soviet/Poland/Czechoslovakia/East Germany/Bulgaria/Hungary/Romania 1977) - Sovscope 70
- Solntse, snova solntse/Sun, and Sun Again/The Sun, Again the Sun (Soviet 1977) - Sovscope 70
- SOS nad taygoy/SOS from the Taiga (Soviet 1977) - Stereo 70 (3D)
- Sudba/Destiny (Soviet 1977) - Sovscope 70
- Front za liniey fronta/Front Beyond the Front Line/Front Behind the Front Lines/A Front Behind the Lines (Soviet 1977) - Sovscope 70
- Chyornaya beryoza/The Black Birch/A Black Birch Tree (Soviet 1978) - Sovscope 70
- Vsyo reshayet mgnoveniye/A Moment Decides Everything/Moment Decides All/All Solves an Instant/The All-Decisive Moment (Soviet 1978) - Sovscope 70
- Yemelyan Pugachyov/Pugachev (1978 film) (Soviet 1978) - Sovscope 70
- Zamurovannye v stekle/Immured in Glass/Locked in Glass (Soviet 1978) - Stereo 70 (3D)
- Zhnecy/Reapers/The Harvesters (Soviet 1978) - Sovscope 70
- Pogovorim, brat/Talk with Me, Brother/Let's Talk My Brother/Let's Talk, the Brother (Soviet 1978) - Sovscope 70
- Poka bezumstvuyet mechta/While the Dream Is Raving/As Long As the Dream Is Alive (Soviet 1978) - Sovscope 70
- Yaroslavna, koroleva Frantsii/Yaroslavna, Queen of France/Anne, Queen of France (Soviet 1978) - Sovscope 70
- Veroy i pravdoy/With Faith and Truth/By Faith and Truth/Faithfully and Truly/By Faith and By Truth/Belief and the Truth (Soviet 1979) - Sovscope 70
- Takeoff (Soviet 1979) - Sovscope 70
- Vkus khleba/A Taste of Bread (Soviet 1979) - Sovscope 70
- Zabudte slovo 'smert'/Forget the Word 'Death'/Forget the Name of Death (Soviet 1979) - Sovscope 70
- Zdes, na moey zemle/Here, at My Land/Here, On My Land/Here On My Land/Here, On My Earth (Soviet 1979) - Sovscope 70
- Krutoe Pole/Cool Field/Abrupt Field/A Steep Field (Soviet 1979) - Sovscope 70
- Poslednyaya okhota/The Last Hunt/The Last Hunting (Soviet 1979) - Sovscope 70
- Eskadron gusar letuchikh/Squadron of Flying Hussars/Squadron the Hussar of the Flying/The Squadron of the Flying Hussars (Soviet 1980) - Sovscope 70
- Koney na pereprave ne menyayut/Horses Aren't Changed at the Crossing/Don't Change the Horses in the Midstream/They Don't Change Horses While Crossing the River/Horses on a Crossing Do Not Change (Soviet 1980) - Sovscope 70
- Les/The Forest/Wood (Soviet 1980/1987) - Sovscope 70
- Fantaziya na temu lyubvi/Fantasia on the Subject of Love/Fantasy About Love/Imagination On a Love Theme (Soviet 1980) - Sovscope 70
- Vsadnik na zolotom kone/The Horseman on a Gold Horse/The Rider on the Golden Horse (Soviet 1980) - Stereo 70 (3D)
- Express on Fire (Soviet 1981) - Sovscope 70
- Cherez ternii k zvyozdam/To the Stars by Hard Ways/Per Aspera Ad Astra/Through the Thorns to the Stars/Humanoid Woman (Soviet 1980) - Sovscope 70
- Devushka i Grand (Soviet 1981) - Sovscope 70
- Dusha (Soviet 1981) - Sovscope 70
- Lesnaya pesnya. Mavka/A Story of the Forest: Mavka (Soviet 1981) - Sovscope 70
- Pokhishcheniye veka/Kidnapping of the Century (Soviet 1981) - Stereo 70 (3D)
- Shlyapa/The Hat (Soviet 1981) - Sovscope 70
- Yaroslav Mudry (Soviet 1981) - Sovscope 70
- Zvezda i smert Khoakina Muryety (Soviet 1982) - Sovscope 70
- Vasili Buslayev (Soviet 1982) - Sovscope 70
- Vishnyovyy omut/Cherry Whirlpool (Soviet 1982) - Sovscope 70
- Vladivostok, god 1918 (Soviet 1982) - Sovscope 70
- Vysokyi Pereval (Soviet 1982) - Sovscope 70
- Yesli vrag ne sdayotsya.../If the Enemy Doesn't Surrender... (Soviet 1982) - Sovscope 70
- Oslinaya shkura/The Donkey's Hide (Soviet 1982) - Sovscope 70
- Predisloviye k bitve (Soviet 1982) - Sovscope 70
- Tayny svyatogo Yura (Soviet 1982) - Sovscope 70
- Front v tylu vraga/Front in the Rear of the Enemy (Soviet/Czechoslovakia 1981) - Sovscope 70
- Ekzamen na bessmertie (Soviet 1983) - Sovscope 70
- Legenda o knyagine Olge/The Legend of Princess Olga (Soviet 1983) - Sovscope 70
- Na ves zolota (Soviet 1983) - Sovscope 70
- O strannostyakh lyubvi/About Oddities of Love (Soviet 1983) - Stereo 70 (3D)
- Retsept yeyo molodosti/Recipe of Her Youth (Soviet 1983) - Sovscope 70
- Skorost/Speed (Soviet 1983) - Sovscope 70
- Uchenik lekarya/The Doctor's Pupil (Soviet 1983) - Stereo 70 (3D)
- Blistayushchiy mir/The Sparkling World (Soviet 1984) - Sovscope 70
- Geroy eyo romana/Hero of Her Romance (Soviet 1984) - Sovscope 70
- I vot prishyol Bumbo.../And Then Came Bumbo... (Soviet 1984) - Sovscope 70
- I eshchyo odna noch Shekherazady/And Another Shererazade Night (Soviet 1984) - Sovscope 70
- Pervaya konnaya/First Cavalry (Soviet 1984) - Sovscope 70
- Poruchit generalu Nesterovu (Soviet 1984) - Sovscope 70
- Prikhodi svobodnym (Soviet 1984) - Sovscope 70
- Sem stikhiy (Soviet 1984) - Sovscope 70
- Shutki v storonu (Soviet 1984) - Stereo 70 (3D)
- Bitva za Moskvu/The Fight for Moscow (Soviet/Czechoslovakia/East Germany/Hungary 1985) - Sovscope 70
- Chyornaya strela/The Black Arrow (Soviet 1985) - Sovscope 70
- Zhil otvazhnyy kapitan (Soviet 1985) - Sovscope 70
- Matveeva radost (Soviet 1985) - Sovscope 70
- Pryzhok (Soviet 1985) - Sovscope 70
- Sopernitsy (Soviet 1985) - Sovscope 70
- Kapitan 'Piligrima' (Soviet 1986) - Sovscope 70
- Mama, rodnaya, lyubimaya... (Soviet 1986) - Sovscope 70
- Na zlatom kryltse sideli/Sitting on the Golden Porch (Soviet 1986) - Stereo 70 (3D)
- Perekhvat/Interception (Soviet 1986) - Sovscope 70
- Postaraysya ostatsya zhivym (Soviet 1986) - Sovscope 70
- Prodelki v starinnom dukhe/Old Times Pranks (Soviet 1986) - Sovscope 70
- Breakthrough (Soviet 1986) - Sovscope 70
- Rus iznachalnaya/Primary Russia (Soviet 1986) - Sovscope 70
- Stepnaya eskadrilya (Soviet 1986) - Sovscope 70
- Tam, gde nas net (Soviet 1986) - Sovscope 70
- Bayka (Soviet 1987) - Sovscope 70
- Ivan Veliky (Soviet 1987) - Sovscope 70
- Oglasheniyu ne podlezhit (Soviet 1987) - Sovscope 70
- She with a Broom, He in a Black Hat (Soviet 1987) - Stereo 70 (3D)
- Serebryanye struny (Soviet 1987) - Sovscope 70
- Skazka pro vlyublyonnogo malyara (Soviet 1987) - Sovscope 70
- Sledopyt/The Pathfinder (Soviet 1987) - Sovscope 70
- Tsyganka Aza (Soviet 1987) - Sovscope 70
- Bez mundira (Soviet 1988) - Sovscope 70
- Na pomoshch, bratsy! (Soviet 1988) - Sovscope 70
- Raz, dva - gore ne beda (Soviet 1988) - Sovscope 70
- Fantasticheskaya istoriya (Soviet 1988) - Sovscope 70
- Cyrano de Bergerac (Soviet 1989) - Sovscope 70
- Kamennaya dusha (Soviet 1989) - Sovscope 70
- Suvenir dlya prokurora (Soviet 1989) - Stereo 70 (3D)
- Vanka-vstanka (Soviet 1990) - Stereo 70 (3D)
- Vlyublyonnyy maneken/The Model Who Fell in Love (Soviet 1991) - Stereo 70 (3D)
- Rys idet po sledu (Russia 1994) - Stereo 70 (3D)

== See also ==
- List of IMAX films
- 70 mm film
- List of early wide-gauge films
- 70 mm Grandeur film
- Cinerama
- Kinopanorama
- List of film formats
- Super Panavision 70
- Super Technirama 70
- Todd-AO
- Ultra Panavision 70
