= Film gauge =

Physical width of film stock

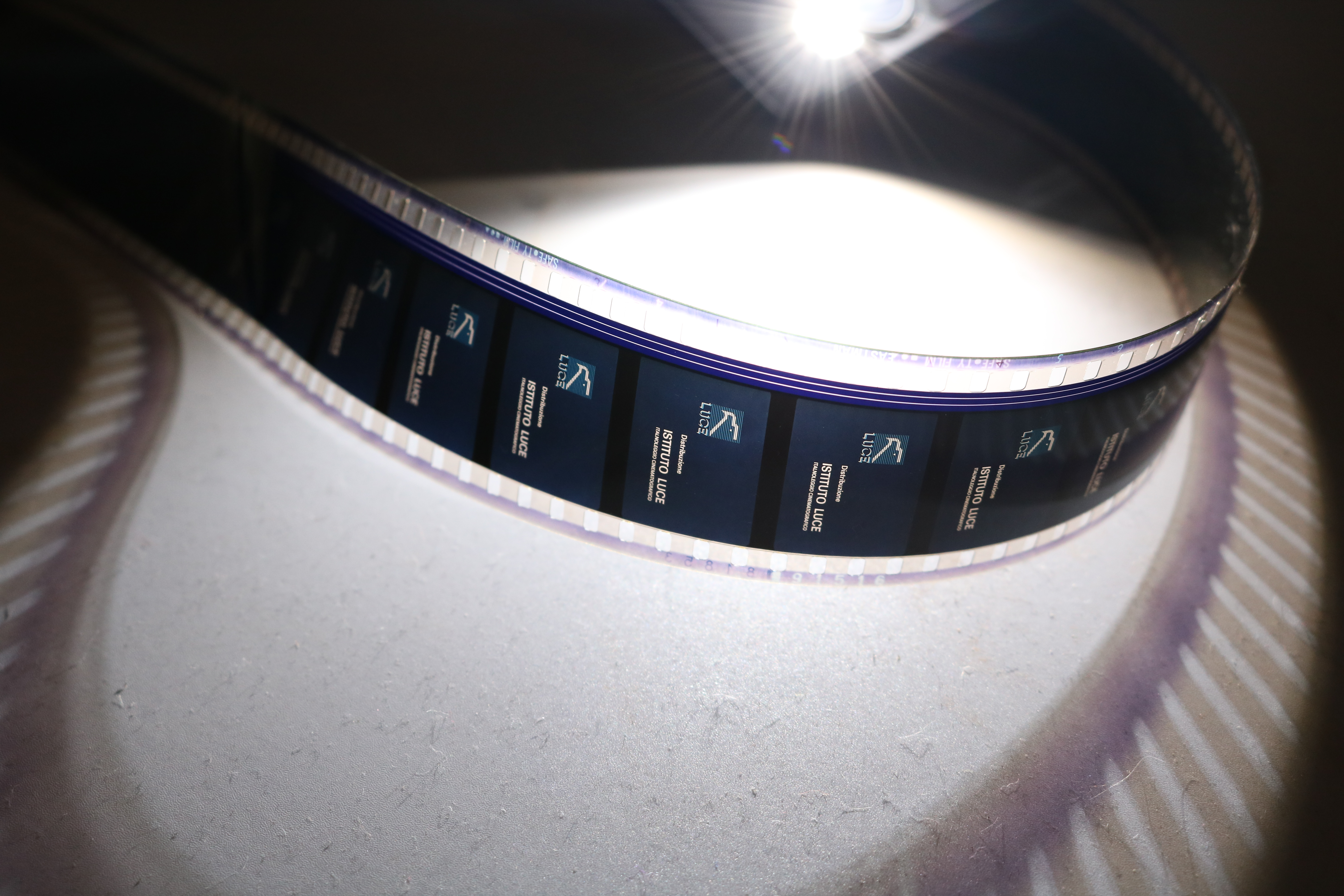
A 35 mm film gauge illuminated with the flashlight of a smartphone.

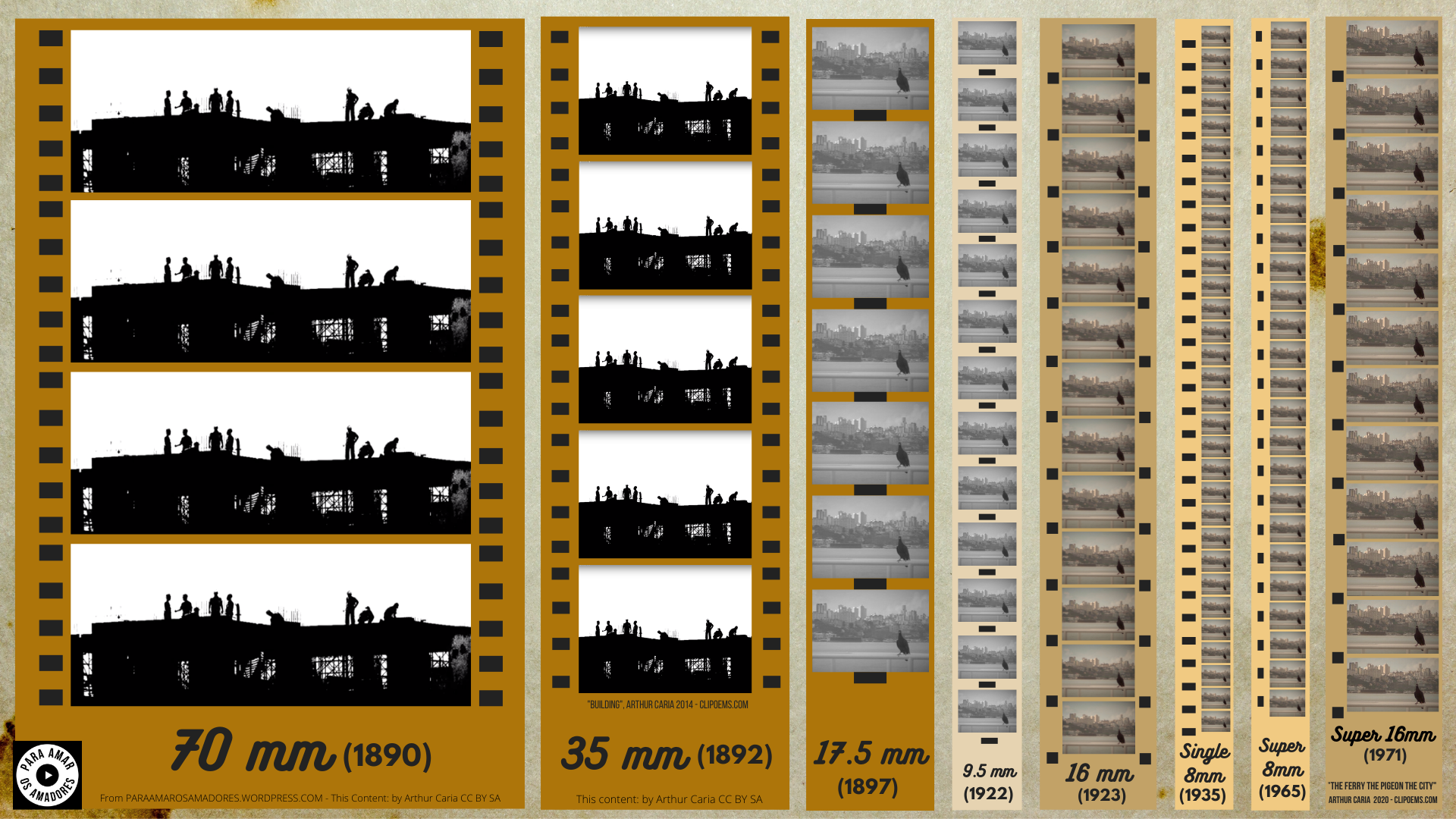

Film gauge is a physical property of photographic or motion picture film stock which defines its width. Traditionally, the major movie film gauges are 8 mm, 16 mm, 35 mm, and 65/70 mm (in this case 65 mm for the negative and 70 mm for the release print; the extra five millimeters are reserved for the magnetic soundtrack). There have been other historic gauges in the past, especially in the silent era, most notably 9.5 mm film, as well as a panoply of others ranging from 3 mm to 75 mm.

Larger film gauge is generally associated with higher image quality, higher image detail, greater materials expense, heavier camera equipment, larger and most costly projection equipment, as well as greater bulk and weight for distribution and storage (both interim and archival).

== Size comparison between different film gauges ==
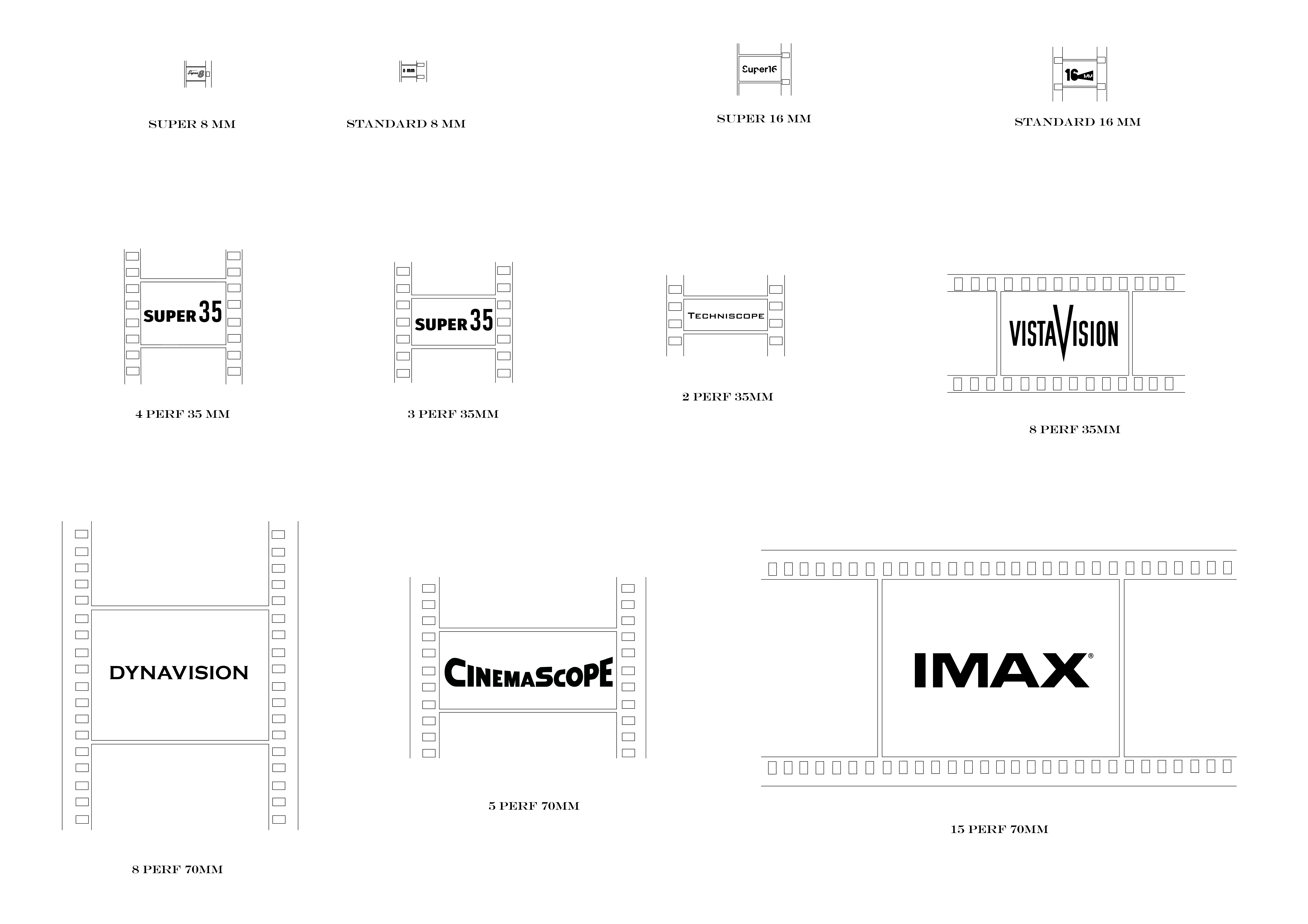
Size comparison between different film gauges.

Format	Gauge	Orientation	Perfs	Aspect ratio (approx.)	Notable for
Super 8	8 mm	Vertical	1	1.33:1	Home movies, nostalgia
Standard 8	8 mm	Vertical	1	1.33:1	Early amateur use
Standard 16	16 mm	Vertical	1	1.33:1	Docs, newsreels
Super 16	16 mm	Vertical	1	1.66:1 – 1.85:1	Indie film, TV
4-Perf 35 mm	35 mm	Vertical	4	1.37:1 (flat) / 2.39:1 (anamorphic)	Industry standard
3-Perf 35 mm	35 mm	Vertical	3	1.85:1	Efficient widescreen
2-Perf 35 mm	35 mm	Vertical	2	2.39:1	Techniscope, budget
VistaVision	35 mm	Horizontal	8	1.50:1 (cropped to 1.85:1)	High-res, VFX
Dynavision	70 mm	Vertical	8	1.39:1	Rare large-frame format
5-Perf 70 mm	70 mm	Vertical	5	2.20:1	Epic cinema
IMAX	70 mm	Horizontal	15	1.43:1	Ultra-large format

== See also ==
- Film format, includes the standards for image capture and projection, as well as film gauge.
- List of early wide-gauge films
