= Cine 160 =

35 mm film projection process

Cine 160 is a 35 mm film projection process proposed by Allan Silliphant whereby a single frame of film would occupy a length of six film perforations. This could then be used for either of two currently proposed applications: 3D film projection from two images each occupying 3 perforations (thus attaining a 1.85 aspect ratio already in common use), or making anamorphically squeezed prints of 1.85 ratio films, which would use a greater amount of image area. The system is named Cine 160 because the six-perf frame uses 1.60 times the area of a conventional print. This system has not yet received any mainstream application, however, and it is unknown how receptive theater owners will be to the prospect, which will require significant expenses to re-fit projectors to the format.

== Claimed benefits ==
- Larger frame area can facilitate better and brighter 3D projection, or offer a low cost means to approach 70 mm film image brightness and clarity using 35 mm film and an anamorphic lens.
- Allows more brightness and detail to reach the screen than conventional 35mm prints, much greater detail in camera image.
- Permits better brightness when divided into above and below split frames for 3D, or if used non-stereo with anamorphic lens.
- Very easy conversion of projector, and can be set up for "quick-change" in theaters.
- Will look much better, brighter, than 2K digital at 1/10 of the conversion cost. Full 1.60 better than even anamorphic 35.
- Will permit running of 35mm IMAX reduction prints in small theaters in remote locations.
- Allows most existing cameras to be modified to shoot in the format, or projectors to be easily modified.
- Can act as a "value added" marketing attraction, due to promotion of trade name, like 70mm did in the past.
- There is no waste when fitting image onto an existing 1.85 theater screen, just more brightness, gamma range, and detail.
- Digital conversion will be a hard sell in the poorer parts of world. This will allow 3D and "faked 70mm" everywhere soon.
- Easy to shoot in digital, then make a "DI" (digital intermediate) to release on "near 4K quality".
