= 70 mm Grandeur film =

Early yet successful Wide Screen Film format used in the late 1920s/early 1930s

70 mm Grandeur film, also called Fox Grandeur or Grandeur 70, is a 70 mm widescreen film format developed by William Fox through his Fox Film and Fox-Case corporations and used commercially on a small but successful scale in 1929–30.

== History ==
In 1925, with the advent of television on the horizon, William Fox of the Fox Film Studio empire envisioned a "grand" cinema experience to keep the public coming to the movie theaters. As such, he soon put full efforts behind enhancing the silent 35 mm film showings by the addition of sound to be coupled to a wider than 35mm end product, with the hoped for result being a grand and lifelike experience for the viewers. This wide screen vision of William Fox soon resulted in his creating a partnership with Theodore Case and his assistant, Earl Sponable, pioneers of Sound on Film, with the partnership to be named the Fox-Case Corporation. The result was, first, the advent of Movietone Sound, then soon combined with the 70 mm "Grandeur" wide screen camera, with the Grandeur film process becoming the first theatrically successful wide screen film process when Fox Film Studio's released their epic made-for-Grandeur film, The Big Trail, in October 1930.

The 70mm Fox Grandeur cameras were manufactured by Mitchell Camera Corporation, and were based on the Mitchell Studio Standard 35mm camera, enlarged to accommodate 70 mm 4-perf film. The cameras were designated as Mitchell Model FC cameras, the FC designation most likely originally standing for Fox-Case, as the technical specifications and orders for the cameras were submitted to Mitchell by the Fox-Case Corporation. The first three Fox Grandeur production cameras to be delivered were FC-1, FC-2, and FC-3, delivered to Fox-Case Corporation in New York on May 1, 1929, eventually followed by a total of 8 or 9 Fox Film Studio Grandeur Cameras. An additional four Grandeur cameras were delivered to MGM in 1930, plus one additional camera that was delivered to Feature Productions, also in 1930. William Fox himself had purchased the Mitchell Camera Corporation in mid 1929, with expectations of cornering the market on the cameras and equipment necessary for producing wide screen cinema.

A small number of shorts and features were produced in 70mm wide Fox Grandeur in 1929, while Fox Studios prepared for their big release of a film specifically created to be shot in 70 mm widescreen. The 1929 shorts and features included several issues of Fox Movietone News called Fox Grandeur News first shown May 26, 1929. Features shot in Grandeur include Fox Movietone Follies of 1929, the musical Happy Days (1929), directed by Benjamin Stoloff, Song o’ My Heart (1930), a musical feature starring Irish tenor John McCormack and directed by Frank Borzage (Seventh Heaven, A Farewell to Arms). By April 1930, Fox Film Studios was prepared to begin filming for their greatest Grandeur epic film and Western The Big Trail (1930), directed by Raoul Walsh, cinematography by Arthur Edeson ASC, in which John Wayne at age 22 played his first starring role.

Song 'o My Heart was double-shot in both conventional 35 mm and Fox Grandeur, with all action and singing performed separately for the two processes. Production began in November 1929, and the 35mm version debuted on March 11, 1930, in New York. The Grandeur version, however, shipped from the labs on March 17, 1930, was never released and may no longer survive, according to film historian Miles Kreuger.

Filming of The Big Trail, which began in April 1930, was shot simultaneously in Grandeur and conventional 35mm movie film. Both versions survive, and differ significantly in composition, staging and editing. When the film was released on October 2, 1930, the only theaters equipped with the Grandeur projectors and wide screen were Grauman's Chinese Theater in Los Angeles and the Roxy Theatre in New York City.

The Fox Grandeur process was first and foremost of a small number of widescreen processes which were developed by the major Hollywood studios alongside sound in the late 1920s and early 1930s. Although the format proved to be successful, due to the Great Depression that began with the fall of Wall Street in October 1929, the Grandeur format then proved financially unviable for an industry still struggling to invest in the switch to talking pictures. Other theatres were resistant to making the large investment necessary, and the onset of the Great Depression rendered the prospect of large-scale adoption of the expensive system untenable. Ultimately, the widescreen aspect ratio did become established by the early-1960s. Fox used the Grandeur name again on a re-release of The King and I; this re-release was a Todd AO compatible 70mm reduction of the original CinemaScope 55 negative, advertised as being in “Grandeur 70”.

Unlike the later Todd-AO system (which printed onto 70mm film), Grandeur did not use the same perforations as 35mm film, but instead had larger perforations on a longer pitch of 0.234 inch (5.95 mm) compared to the 0.187 inch (4.75 mm) pitch used by both 35 mm film and modern 70 mm film. Although Grandeur used a four perforation pulldown (i.e. each frame occupied the height equivalent to four perforations on the film) rather than the five of Todd-AO, because of the longer pitch the height of the image, at 0.91 inch (23.1 mm), was slightly greater than that of the 0.816 inch (20.73 mm) Todd AO image. The image width was 1.84 inch (46.74 mm) giving an aspect ratio of 2:1 and providing enough space for a Fox Movietone variable-density optical soundtrack of approximately double the width of that used on a 35 mm print.

== See also ==
- List of film formats
- List of 70 mm films
- Super Panavision 70
- Super Technirama 70
- Ultra Panavision 70
- Widescreen
