= 70 mm film =

Wide high-resolution film gauge

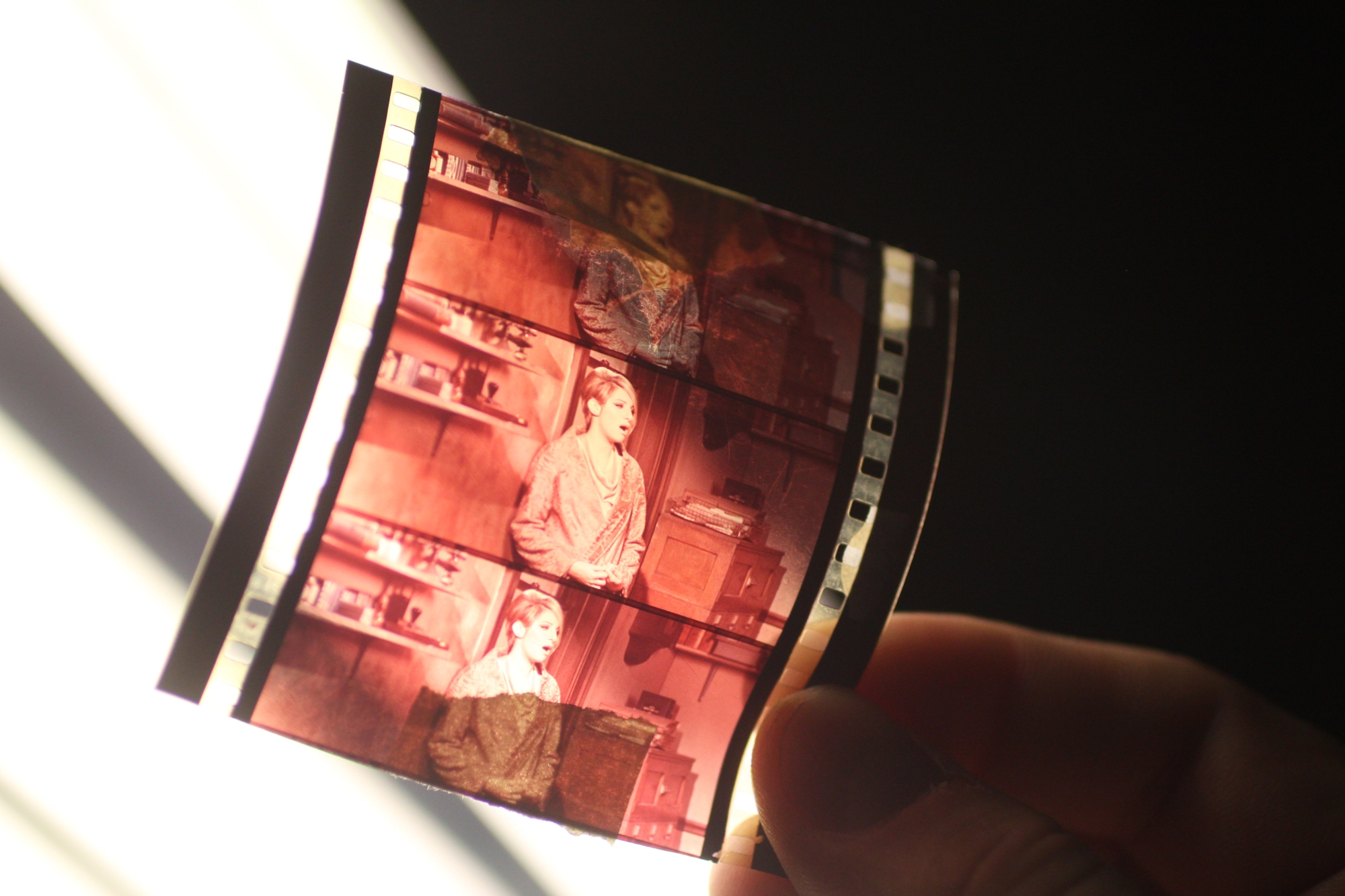
A 70 mm film strip with a human hand for scale

70 mm film (or 65 mm film) is a wide high-resolution film gauge for motion picture photography, with a negative area nearly 3.5 times as large as the standard 35 mm motion picture film format. As used in cameras, the film is 65 mm (2.6 in) wide. For projection, the original 65 mm film is printed on 70 mm (2.8 in) film. The additional 5 mm contains the four magnetic stripes, holding six tracks of stereophonic sound. Although later 70 mm prints use digital sound encoding (specifically the DTS format), the vast majority of existing and surviving 70 mm prints pre-date this technology.

Each frame is five perforations tall (i.e., 23.8125 mm or 15/16 inches tall), with an image aspect ratio of 2.2:1. The use of anamorphic Ultra Panavision 70 lenses squeezes an ultra-wide 2.76:1 aspect ratio horizontally into that 2.2:1 imaging area. To this day, Ultra Panavision 70 produces the second widest picture size; surpassed only by Polyvision, which was only used for 1927's Napoléon.

With regard to exhibition, 70 mm film was always considered a specialty format reserved for epics and spectacle films shot on 65 mm and blockbuster films that were released both in 35 mm and as 70 mm blow-ups. While few venues were equipped to screen this special format, at the height of its popularity most major markets and cities had a theater that could screen it. Some venues continue to screen 70 mm to this day or have even had 70 mm projectors permanently or temporarily installed for more recent 70 mm releases.

== History ==
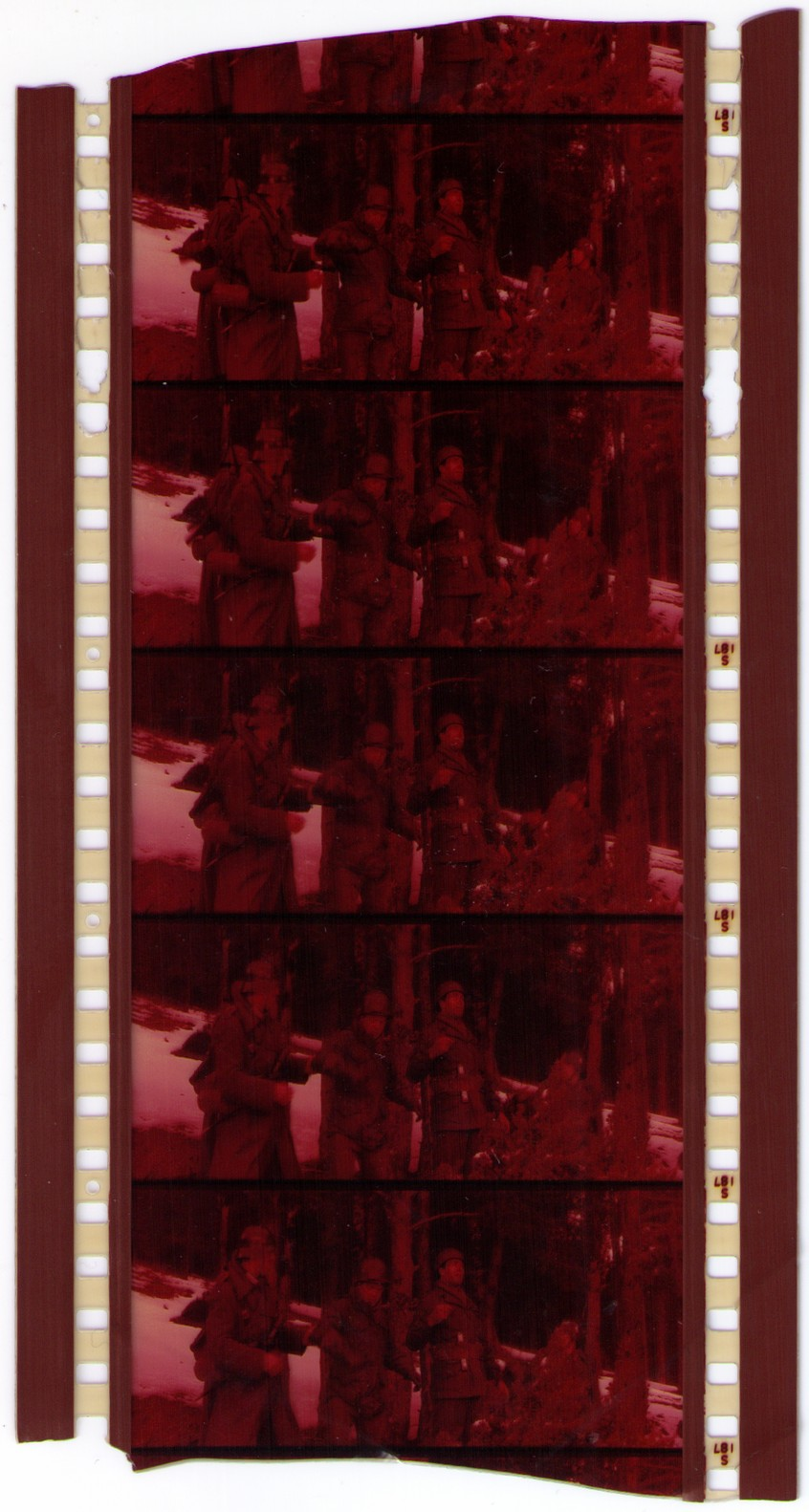
Faded vintage 70 mm positive film with four magnetic strips containing six-channel stereophonic sound

Films formatted with a width of 70 mm have existed since the early days of the motion picture industry. The first 70 mm format film was most likely footage of the Henley Regatta, which was projected in 1896 and 1897, but may have been filmed as early as 1894. It required a specially built projector built by Herman Casler in Canastota, New York and had a ratio similar to full frame, with an aperture of 2.75 inches (70 mm) by 2 inches (51 mm). There were also several film formats of various sizes from 50 to 68 mm which were developed from 1884 onwards, including Cinéorama (not to be confused with the entirely distinct "Cinerama" format), started in 1900 by Raoul Grimoin-Sanson. In 1914 the Italian Filoteo Alberini invented a panoramic film system utilising a 70 mm wide film called Panoramica.

=== Fox Grandeur ===
In 1928, William Fox of the Fox Film Corporation, in personal collaboration with Theodore Case as the Fox-Case Corporation, began working on a wide film format using 70 mm film which they named Grandeur. Cameras were ordered by Fox-Case from Mitchell Camera Corp, with the first 70 mm production cameras, designated as the Mitchell Model FC camera, delivered to Fox-Case in May 1929. This was one of a number of wide-film processes developed by some of the major film studios at about that time. However, due to the financial strains of the Great Depression, along with strong resistance from movie theater owners, who were in the process of equipping their theaters for sound, none of these systems became commercially successful. Fox dropped Grandeur in 1930.

=== Todd-AO ===
Todd-AO / Panavision (5-perf) 65 mm negative frame dimensions; the Ultra Panavision 1.25× anamorphic process is represented by the distorted circle.

Producer Mike Todd had been one of the founders of Cinerama, a wide-screen movie process that was launched in 1952. Cinerama employed three 35 mm film projectors running in synchronism to project a wide (2.6:1) image onto a deeply curved screen. Although the results were impressive, the system was expensive, cumbersome and had some serious shortcomings due to the need to match up three separate projected images. Todd left the company to develop a system of his own which, he hoped, would be as impressive as Cinerama, yet be simpler and cheaper and avoid the problems associated with three-strip projection; in his own words, he wanted "Cinerama out of one hole".

In collaboration with the American Optical Company, Todd developed a system which was to be called "Todd-AO". This uses a single 70 mm wide film and was introduced with the film Oklahoma! in October 1955. The 70 mm film is perforated at the same pitch (0.187 inch, 4.75 mm) as standard 35 mm film. With a five-perforation pull-down, the Todd-AO system provides a frame dimension of 1.912 inch (48.56 mm) by 0.87 inch (22.09 mm) giving an aspect ratio of 2.2:1.

The original version of Todd-AO used a frame rate of 30 per second, 25% faster than the 24 frames per second that was (and is) the standard; this was changed after the second film – Around the World in 80 Days - because of the need to produce (24 frame/sec) 35 mm reduction prints from the Todd-AO 65 mm negative. The Todd-AO format was originally intended to use a deeply curved Cinerama-type screen but this failed to survive beyond the first few films. However, in the 1960s and 70s, such films as The Sound of Music and Patton (which had been filmed in a process known as Dimension 150) were shown in some Cinerama theaters, which allowed for deeply curved screens.

Todd-AO adopted a similar multi-channel magnetic sound system to the one developed for Cinemascope two years earlier, recorded on "stripes" of magnetic oxide deposited on the film. However, Todd-AO has six channels instead of the four of Cinemascope and due to the wider surround stripe and faster film speed provides superior audio quality. Five of these six channels are fed to five speakers spaced behind the screen, and the sixth is fed to surround speakers around the walls of the auditorium.

=== Panavision and the 65/70 mm format ===
Panavision developed their own 65/70 mm system that was technically compatible and virtually identical to Todd-AO. Monikered as Super Panavision 70, it used spherical lenses and the same 2.2:1 aspect ratio at 24 frames per second. Panavision also had another 65 mm system, Ultra Panavision 70, which sprang from the MGM Camera 65 system they helped develop for MGM that was used to film Raintree County and Ben-Hur. Both Ultra Panavision 70 and MGM Camera 65 employed an anamorphic lens with a 1.25× squeeze on a 65 mm negative (as opposed to 35 mm CinemaScope which used a 2× compression, or 8-perf, horizontally filmed 35 mm Technirama which used a 1.5× compression). When projected on a 70 mm print, a 1.25× anamorphic projection lens was used to decompress the image to an aspect ratio of 2.76:1, one of the widest ever used in commercial cinema.

== Decline and resurgence ==
Due to the high cost of 70 mm film and the expensive projection system and screen required to use the stock, distribution for films using the stock was limited, although this did not always hurt profits. Most 70 mm films were also released on 35 mm film for a wider distribution after the initial debut of the film. South Pacific (1958), Lawrence of Arabia (1962), My Fair Lady (1964), and The Sound of Music (1965) are well-known films widely shown in 70 mm format with a general release in 35 mm format. 70 mm film received a brief resurgence in the 1980s when it became popular to make "blow-up" prints of 35 mm titles. It had another resurgence in the mid-2010s with the release of The Master (2012), The Hateful Eight (2015) and Dunkirk (2017), with a small number of venues getting temporary or permanent 70 mm film projectors in order to be able to screen these titles. Quentin Tarantino, in particular, led a successful campaign to have the equipment required to show The Hateful Eight in Ultra Panavision installed in 100 cinemas worldwide.

=== Blow-ups ===
The 35 mm to 70 mm "blow-up" process produces 70 mm release prints from 35 mm negatives, so that films shot on the smaller format could benefit from 70 mm image and sound quality. This process began in the 1960s with titles like The Cardinal (1963) and continues up until the present day, with the height of its popularity being in the 1980s. These enlargements often provided richer colors, and a brighter, steadier and sharper (though often grainier) image, but the main benefit was the ability to provide 6-channel stereophonic sound as most theaters before the mid-70s (before the advent of Dolby A) were screening 35 mm prints with single channel monaural sound. However these "blow-ups" rarely used the full six channels of the Todd-AO system and instead used the four-track mixes made for 35 mm prints, the additional half-left and half-right speakers of the Todd-AO layout being fed with a simple mix of the signals intended for the adjacent speakers (known as a "spread") or simply left blank. If a 70 mm film was shown in a Cinerama theatre, the Cinerama sound system was used. From 1976 onwards, many 70 mm prints used Dolby noise reduction on the magnetic tracks but Dolby disliked the "spread" and instead re-allocated the 6 available tracks to provide for left, center and right screen channels, left and right surround channels plus a "low-frequency enhancement" channel to give more body to low-frequency bass. This layout came to be known as "5.1" (the "point one" is the low-frequency enhancement channel) and was subsequently adopted for digital sound systems used with 35 mm.

In the 1980s the use of these "blow-ups" increased with large numbers of 70 mm prints being made of some blockbusters of the period such as the 125 70 mm prints made of The Empire Strikes Back (1980). However the early 1990s saw the advent of digital sound systems (Dolby Digital, DTS and SDDS) for 35 mm prints which meant that 35 mm could finally match 70 mm for sound quality but at a far lower cost. Coupled with the rise of the multiplex cinema, which meant that audiences were increasingly seeing films on relatively small screens rather than the giant screens of the old "Picture Palaces", this meant that the expensive 70 mm format went out of favour again. The DTS digital sound-on-disc system was adapted for use with 70 mm film, thus saving the significant costs of magnetic striping, but this has not been enough to stop the decline, and 70 mm prints were rarely made.

Among some of the more recent 70 mm blow-up titles are Paul Thomas Anderson's Inherent Vice (2014), Phantom Thread (2017) and Licorice Pizza (2021), Patty Jenkins's Wonder Woman (2017), Steven Spielberg's Ready Player One (2018) and Brady Corbet's The Brutalist (2024).

=== Current use ===
From 1970, the usage of 65 mm negative film drastically reduced, although the Soviet Union (who used 70 mm stock) continued to use it frequently until the end of the 1980s. This was in part due to the high cost of 65 mm raw stock and processing. Some of the few films since 1990 shot entirely on 65 mm stock are Kenneth Branagh's Hamlet (1996), Ron Fricke's Baraka (1992) and its sequel, Samsara (2011) and Quentin Tarantino's The Hateful Eight (2015). Some titles used a mixture of 5-perf and 15-perf (IMAX) 65 mm stock, including Christopher Nolan's films Dunkirk (2017), Tenet (2020), Oppenheimer (2023) and The Odyssey (2026) and Ryan Coogler's Sinners (2025).

Other titles with a significant amount of 65 mm footage (both 5-perf and 15-perf) include Ron Howard's Far and Away (1992), Kenneth Branagh's Murder on the Orient Express (2017) and Death on the Nile (2022), Paul Thomas Anderson's The Master (2012), and Christopher Nolan's The Dark Knight (2008), Inception (2010), The Dark Knight Rises (2012) and Interstellar (2014).

Since the 2010s, most movie theaters have converted to digital projection systems, resulting in the removal of both 35 mm (the previous industry standard) projectors and 70 mm projectors. However some venues and organizations remain committed to screening 70 mm film, seeing the special format as something that can set them apart and be an audience draw in an industry where most movies are screened digitally.

70 mm film festivals continue to take place regularly at venues such as The Somerville Theatre in Somerville, Massachusetts, The Music Box Theatre in Chicago, the Hollywood Theatre in Portland, Oregon, the American Cinematheque's Aero and Egyptian Theaters in Los Angeles, the Museum of the Moving Image in New York City, the TIFF Bell Lightbox in Toronto, the Worcester Polytechnic Institute in Worcester, Massachusetts, and the AFI Silver Theatre in Silver Spring, Maryland, among others.

== Uses of 70 mm ==
=== Ultra Panavision ===
An anamorphic squeeze combined with 65 mm film allowed for extremely wide aspect ratios to be used while still preserving quality. This was used in the 1957 film Raintree County and to incredible success in the 1959 film Ben-Hur and the 2015 film The Hateful Eight, both of which were filmed with the Ultra Panavision 70/MGM Camera 65 process at an aspect ratio of 2.76:1. It required the use of a 1.25× anamorphic lens to compress the image horizontally, and a corresponding lens on the projector to uncompress it.

=== Visual effects ===
Limited use of 65 mm film was revived in the late 1970s for some of the visual effects sequences in films like Close Encounters of the Third Kind, mainly because the larger negative did a better job than 35 mm negative of minimizing visible film grain during optical compositing. 65 mm was the primary film format used at VFX pioneer Douglas Trumbull's facility EEG (Entertainment Effects Group), which later became Boss Film Studios, run by ex-Industrial Light & Magic (ILM) supervisor Richard Edlund. Since the 1990s, a handful of films (such as Spider-Man 2) have used 65 mm for this purpose, but the usage of digital intermediate for compositing has largely negated these issues. Digital intermediate offers other benefits such as lower cost and a greater range of available lenses and accessories to ensure a consistent look to the footage.

=== IMAX ===
IMAX (15-perf) horizontal pulldown 70 mm film and frame dimensions

A horizontal variant of 70 mm, with an even bigger picture area, is used for the high-performance IMAX format which uses a frame that is 15 perforations wide on 70 mm film. The Dynavision and Astrovision systems each use slightly less film per frame and vertical pulldown to save print costs while being able to project onto an IMAX screen. Both were rare, with Astrovision largely used in Japanese planetariums. IMAX introduced a digital projection system in the late 2000s and most IMAX venues have migrated to a digital setup.

=== 70 mm 3D early use ===
The first commercial introduction of 70 mm single projector 3D was the 1967 release of Con la muerte a la espalda, a Spanish/French/Italian co-production which used a process called Hi-Fi Stereo 70, itself based on a simplified, earlier developed Soviet process called Stereo-70. This process captured two anamorphic images, one for each eye, side by side on 65 mm film. A special lens on a 70 mm projector added polarization and merged the two images on the screen. The 1971 re-release of Warner Bros.' House of Wax used the side-by-side StereoVision format and was distributed in both anamorphically squeezed 35 mm and deluxe non-anamorphic 70 mm form. The system was developed by Allan Silliphant and Chris Condon of StereoVision International Inc., which handled all technical and marketing aspects on a five-year special-royalty basis with Warner Bros. The big screen 3D image was both bright and clear, with all the former sync and brightness problems of traditional dual 35 mm 3D eliminated. Still, it took many years more before IMAX began to test the water for big-screen 3D, and sold the concept to Hollywood executives.

=== IMAX 3D ===
Hollywood has released films shot on 35 mm as IMAX blow-up versions. Many 3D films were shown in the 70 mm IMAX format. The Polar Express in IMAX 3D 70 mm earned 14 times as much, per screen, as the simultaneous 2D 35 mm release of that film in the fall of 2004.

== Technical specifications ==
=== Standard 65 mm (5/70) (Todd-AO, Super Panavision) ===
- spherical lenses
- 5 perforations/frame (1 perforation = 0.1875 in or 3/16 in, thus 1 frame of 70 mm film has a height of 0.9375 in or 15/16 in)
- 42 frames/meter (12.8 frames/ft)
- 34.29 meters/minute (112.5 ft/minute)
- vertical pulldown
- 24 frames/second
- camera aperture: 52.63 by 23.01 mm (2.072 by 0.906 in)
- projection aperture: 48.56 by 22.10 mm (1.912 by 0.870 in)
- 305 m (1000 feet), about 9 minutes at 24 frame/s = 4.5 kg (10 pounds) in can
- aspect ratio: 2.2:1

=== Ultra Panavision 70 (MGM Camera 65) ===
Same as Standard 65 mm except

- projection aperture: 48.59 by 22.05 mm (1.913 by 0.868 in)
- MGM Camera 65 lenses built by Panavision employed a square-shaped, double wedge-prism anamorphic attachment in front of a spherical objective lens. By the time of Mutiny on the Bounty (1962) Panavision had developed a new set of Ultra Panavision 70 lenses that used a high quality cylindrical anamorphic element in front of the objective lens. These new lenses were far superior to the prism anamorphics—they were lighter, transmitted more light and suffered from less spherical and chromatic aberration.
- 1.25x squeeze factor, projected aspect ratio 2.76:1

=== Showscan ===
Same as Standard 65 mm except

- 60 frames per second
- 180 degree shutter

=== IMAX (15/70) ===
- spherical lenses
- 70 mm film, 15 perforations per frame
- horizontal rolling loop movement, from right to left (viewed from emulsion side)
- 24 frames per second
- camera aperture: 70.41 mm × 51.61 mm (2.772 in × 2.032 in)
- projection aperture: 69.60 mm × 48.56 mm (2.740 in × 1.912 in)
- aspect ratio: 1.43:1

=== IMAX Dome / OMNIMAX ===
Same as IMAX except

- fisheye lens
- lens optically centered 9.4 mm (0.37 in) above film horizontal center line
- projected elliptically on a dome screen, 20° below and 110° above perfectly centered viewers

=== Omnivision Cinema 180 ===
same as standard 65/70 except:

- photographed and projected with special fisheye lenses matched to large 180-degree dome screen
- Theatres upgraded from 70 mm 6-track analog sound to DTS digital sound in 1995.

Omnivision started in Sarasota, Florida. Theatres were designed to compete with Omnimax but with much lower startup and operating costs. Most theatres were built in fabric domed structures designed by Seaman Corporation. The last known OmniVision theatres to exist in USA are The Alaska Experience Theatre in Anchorage, Alaska, built in 1981 (closed in 2007, reopened in 2008), and the Hawaii Experience Theatre in Lahaina, Hawaii (closed in 2004). Rainbow's End (theme park) in NZ had the only remaining permanent Cinema 180 attraction until May 2015 when it was demolished.

One of the few producers of 70 mm films for Cinema 180 was the German company Cinevision (today AKPservices GmbH, Paderborn).

=== Dynavision (8/70) ===
8-perf 70 mm film diagram

- fisheye or spherical lenses, depending on if projecting for a dome or not
- vertical pulldown
- 24 or 30 frames per second
- camera aperture: 52.63 mm × 37.72 mm (2.072 in × 1.485 in)
- projection aperture: 48.56 mm × 36.00 mm (1.912 in × 1.417 in)
- aspect ratio: 1.35:1

=== Astrovision (10/70) ===
- vertical pulldown
- normally printed from an Omnimax negative
- projected onto a dome
- almost exclusively in use only by Japanese planetariums
- the only 70 mm format without sound, hence the only one with perforations next to the edges

== See also ==
- 70 mm Grandeur film
- Cine 160
- Cinerama
- Dolby Stereo 70 mm Six Track
- IMAX
- Super Panavision 70
- Super Technirama 70
- Todd-AO
- Ultra Panavision 70
- List of film formats
- List of early wide-gauge films
- List of 70 mm films
