= Happy Days (1929 film) =

1929 film

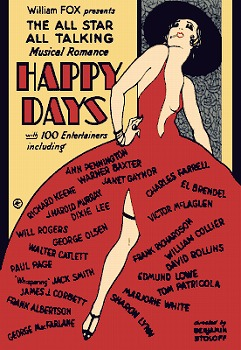
- theatrical release poster
- Directed by: Benjamin Stoloff
- Written by: Sidney LanfieldFox Film CorporationEdwin J. Burke
- Produced by: William Fox
- Starring: Charles E. Evans; Marjorie White; Richard Keene; Stuart Erwin
- Cinematography: Lucien N. Andriot; John Schmitz; J.O. Taylor
- Edited by: Clyde Carruth
- Music by: Harry Stoddard
- Production company: Fox Film Corporation
- Distributed by: Fox Film Corporation
- Release dates: September 17, 1929 (preview); February 13, 1930
- Running time: 80 minutes
- Country: United States
- Language: English

Happy Days is a 1929 American pre-Code musical film directed by Benjamin Stoloff, which was the first feature film shown entirely in widescreen anywhere in the world, filmed using the Fox Grandeur 70 mm process. French director Abel Gance's Napoléon (1927) had a final widescreen segment in what Gance called Polyvision. Paramount released Old Ironsides (1927), with two sequences in a widescreen process called "Magnascope", while MGM released Trail of '98 (1928) in a widescreen process called "Fanthom Screen".

The film features an array of stars who were contracted to William Fox's Fox Film Corporation at that time, including Marjorie White, Will Rogers, Charles Farrell, Janet Gaynor, George Jessel, El Brendel, Ann Pennington, Victor McLaglen, Dixie Lee, Edmund Lowe, and Frank Richardson. It also featured the first appearance of Betty Grable on film, aged 12, as a chorus girl, and Sir Harry Lauder's nephew, Harry Lauder II, a conductor for Fox, who was drafted into the chorus.

== Plot ==
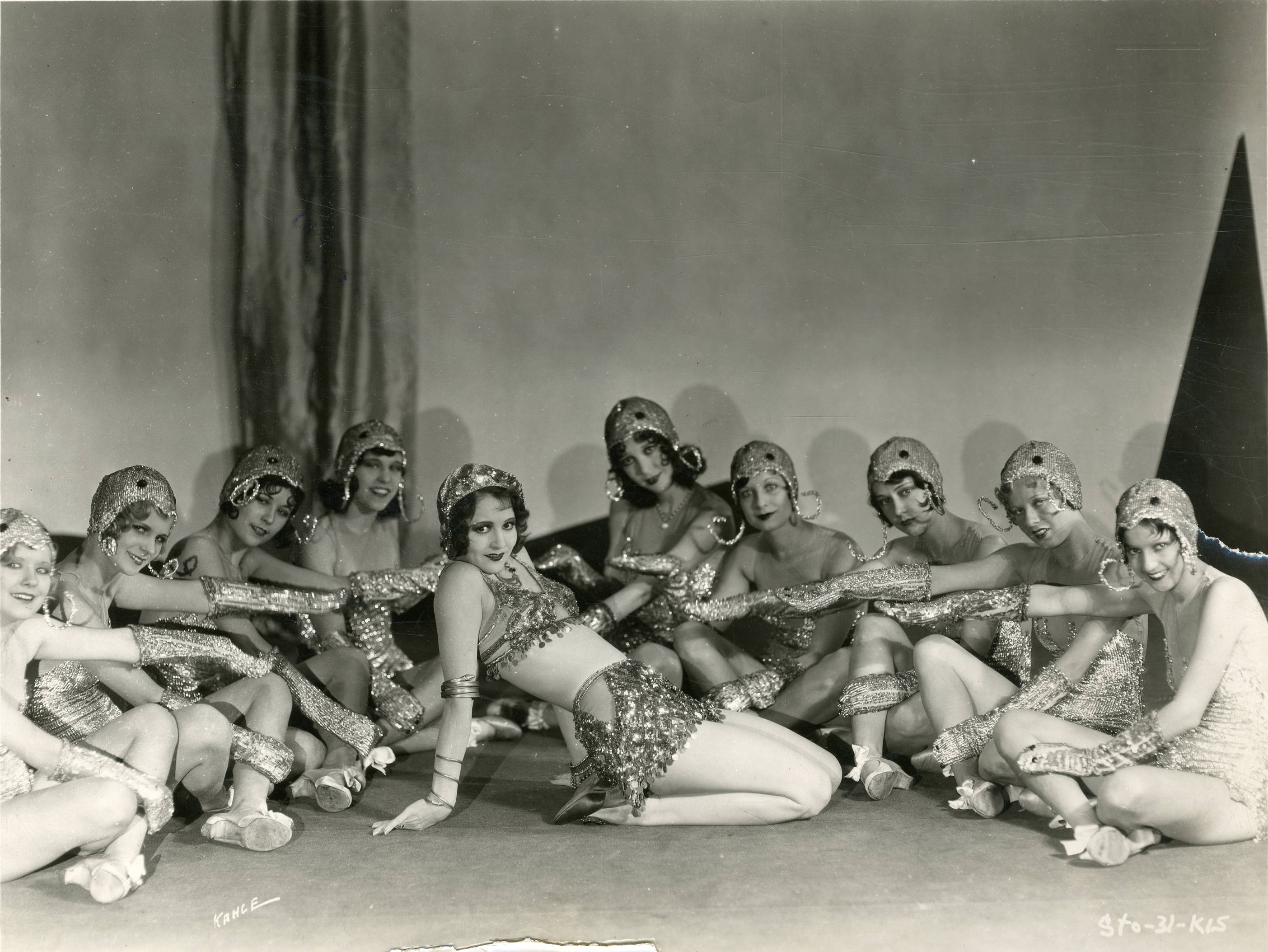
A group of actresses in the film

Originally titled New Orleans Frolic, the story centers around Margie (played by Marjorie White), a singer on a showboat who, when she hears that the showboat is in financial trouble, travels to New York City in an effort to persuade all the boat's former stars to perform in a show to rescue it. She is successful and the stars all fly to New Orleans to surprise the showboat's owner, Colonel Billy Blacher, with a grand show, the proceeds of which will go to rescue the showboat.

== Cast ==
- Charles E. Evans as Colonel Billy Batcher
- Marjorie White as Margie
- Richard Keene as Dick
- Stuart Erwin as Jig
- Martha Lee Sparks as Nancy Lee
- Clifford Dempsey as Sheriff Benton
- James J. Corbett as Interlocutor – Minstrel Show
- George MacFarlane as Interlocutor – Minstrel Show
- Janet Gaynor as Janet Gaynor
- Charles Farrell as Charles Farrell
- Victor McLaglen as Minstrel Show Performer
- Edmund Lowe as Minstrel Show Performer
- El Brendel as Minstrel Show Performer
- William Collier Sr. as End Man – Minstrel Show
- Walter Catlett as End Man – Minstrel Show
- Tom Patricola as Minstrel Show Performer
- George Jessel as Minstrel Show Performer
- Will Rogers as Minstrel Show Performer
- Warner Baxter as Minstrel Show Performer
- Ann Pennington as "Snake Hips" Speciality Dancer

== Release ==
After a preview on September 17, 1929, Happy Days premiered at the Roxy Theater in New York City on February 13, 1930 with a Niagara Falls widescreen short on a Grandeur screen of 42x20 ft, compared to the standard 24x18 ft screen. It was also shown in Grandeur at the Carthay Circle Theatre in Los Angeles, from February 28, 1930.

At a screening at the Roxy Theater, film critic Mordaunt Hall praised the cinematography, which was noted to be enhanced by the wider format. However, he regarded the film itself as "not one that gives as full a conception of the possibilities as future films of this type will probably do."

Owing to the Great Depression, few movie theaters invested in equipment for this format and it was soon abandoned. Fox Film Corporation's heavy investment in Grandeur technology led to William Fox losing his business, which was eventually merged in 1935 with Twentieth Century Pictures to form 20th Century Fox. No widescreen print of Happy Days is known to have survived.

== See also ==
- List of early sound feature films (1926–1929)
