= Fox Movietone Follies of 1929 =

1929 film

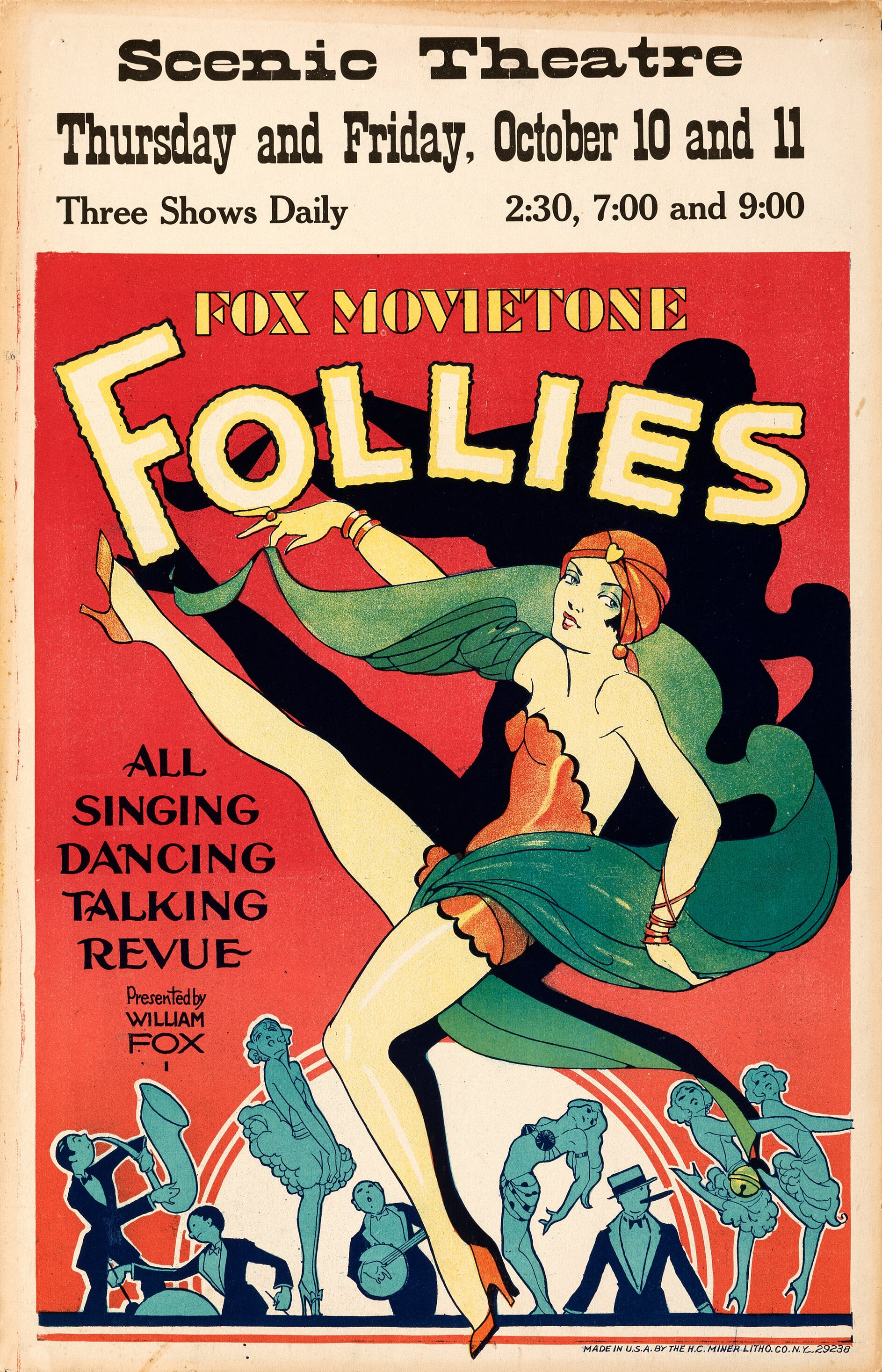
- Theatrical release poster
- Directed by: David Butler; Marcel Silver
- Written by: David Butler; William K. Wells
- Produced by: William Fox
- Starring: Sue Carol; Sharon Lynn; Dixie Lee; Lola Lane
- Cinematography: Charles Van Enger
- Edited by: Ralph Dietrich
- Music by: Arthur Kay
- Production company: William Fox Studio
- Distributed by: Fox Film Corporation
- Release date: May 26, 1929
- Running time: 80 minutes
- Country: United States
- Language: English

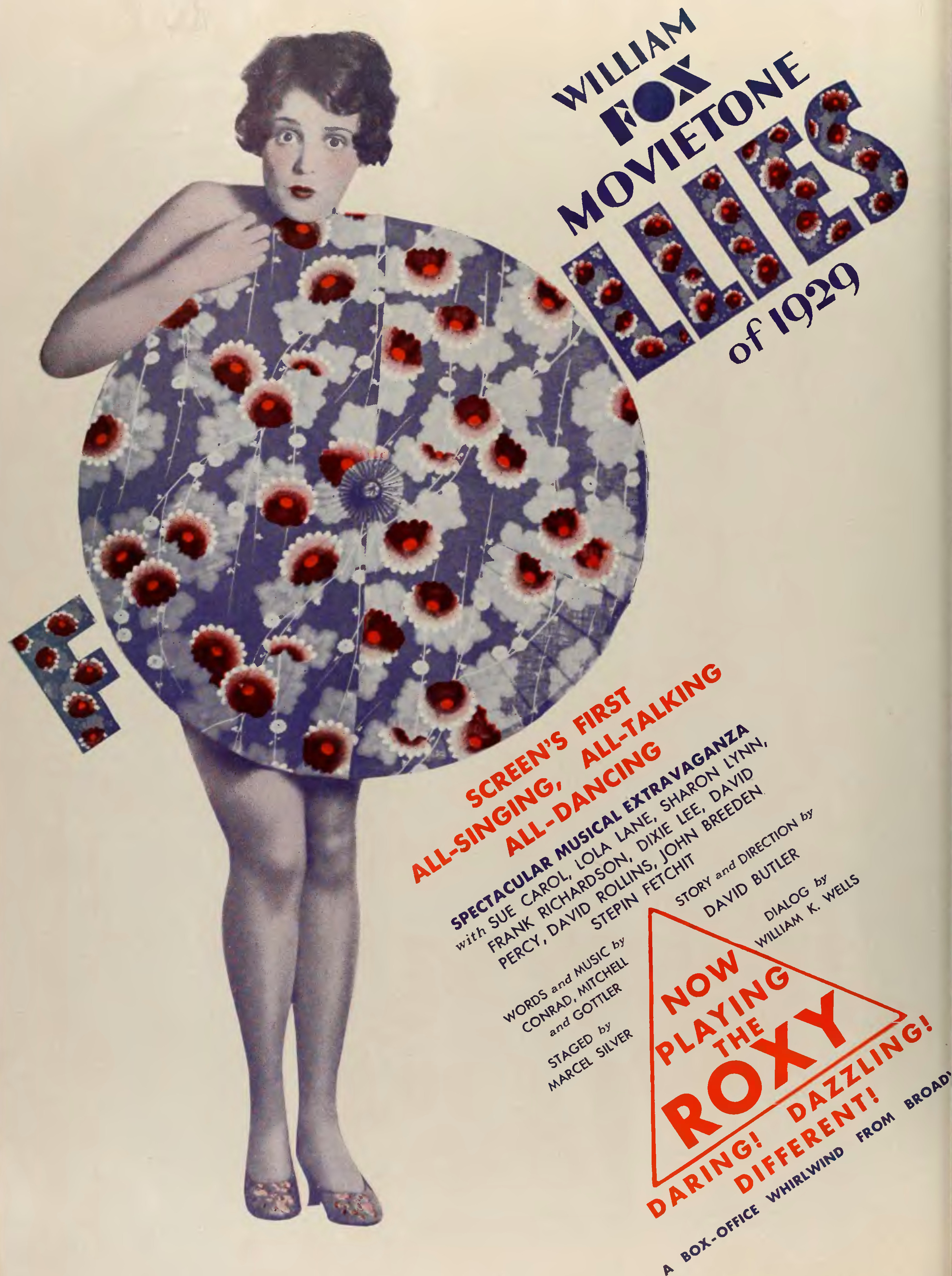
William Fox Movietone Follies of 1929 ad in The Film Daily, 1929

Fox Movietone Follies of 1929, also known as Movietone Follies of 1929 and The William Fox Movietone Follies of 1929, is an American sound (All-Talking) Pre-Code musical film released by Fox Film Corporation. This lavishly produced film featured color sequences in the Multicolor process in some of the revue scenes.

== Plot ==
George Shelby, a boy from the Southern United States, comes to the city to dissuade Lila, his sweetheart, from embarking on a stage career and finally buys out the controlling interest in the revue so that he can fire her. On the opening night, however, she goes onstage when the prima donna of the show becomes temperamental, and she proves to be a big hit. At this development, George is able to sell the show back to the producer, who had previously lacked confidence in his investment and planned to take advantage of the youth's inexperience.

== Cast ==
- John Breeden as George Shelby
- Lola Lane as Lila Beaumont
- DeWitt Jennings as Jay Darrell
- Sharon Lynn as Ann Foster
- Arthur Stone as Al Leaton
- Stepin Fetchit as Swifty
- Warren Hymer as Martin
- Archie Gottler as Stage Manager
- Arthur Kay as Orchestra Leader
- Mario Dominici as Le Maire
- Bobby Burns as unspecified performer (in "Song and Dance Numbers")
- Sue Carol as unspecified performer (in "Song and Dance Numbers")
- Dixie Lee as unspecified performer (in "Song and Dance Numbers")
- Carolynne Snowden as unspecified performer (in "Song and Dance Numbers")
- The Four Covans (uncredited)
- Cee Pee Johnson (uncredited)

== Soundtrack ==
All songs were written by Con Conrad, Archie Gottler and Sidney D. Mitchell.

- "Walking With Susie"
- "Why Can't I Be Like You?"
- "Legs"
- "Breakaway"
- "That's You, Baby"
- "Look What You've Done To Me"
- "Big City Blues"
- "Pearl of Old Japan"

== Production ==
Filming locations for Fox Movietone Follies of 1929 included Havana, New York City, and Palm Beach, Florida.

== Preservation status ==
Fox Movietone Follies of 1929
Partial surviving audio from Reel 6b and 7.

Surviving fragments of the film

The film had Multicolor sequences in its original release, as well as being filmed in the experimental Grandeur wide-screen process. It is now considered a lost film, as all film prints known to exist were destroyed in fires at the Fox storage facility in New Jersey in 1937. The sequel, New Movietone Follies of 1930, also has Multicolor sequences and exists in the UCLA Film and Television Archive.

About 2025, some fragments of the film were located by the Vitaphone Soundtrack Project and posted on their YouTube channel. The project has also posted extant audio elements of the 1929 film on the Internet Archive that have survived on Vitaphone discs. Specifically, "Movietone Sound-on-Disc" audio for reels 6 and 7 still survive, offering the only record of dialogue and music taken directly from the movie. Most of this portion of the soundtrack consists of the "Pearl of Old Japan" number.

== See also ==
- List of early color feature films
- List of early sound feature films (1926–1929)
- List of lost films
- 1937 Fox vault fire
