= Panavision =

American motion picture equipment company

Panavision Inc.
- Type: Private
- Industry: Movie camera rental Motion picture equipment
- Founded: 1954; 72 years ago
- Founder: Robert Gottschalk; Richard Moore
- Headquarters: Woodland Hills, Los Angeles, United States
- Area served: Worldwide
- Key people: Kimberly Snyder (CEO)
- Products: Panaflex cameras Genesis HD camera Grip equipment Lee Filters; Millennium DXL
- Net income: 250,000,000 (2008)
- Owner: Investors led by Cerberus Capital Management
- Number of employees: 1,211 (as of December 31, 2024)
- Website: panavision.com

Panavision Inc. is an American motion picture equipment company founded in 1954 specializing in cameras and lenses, based in Woodland Hills, California. Formed by Robert Gottschalk as a small partnership to create anamorphic projection lenses during the widescreen boom in the 1950s, Panavision expanded its product lines to meet the demands of modern filmmakers. The company introduced its first products in 1954. Originally a provider of CinemaScope accessories, the company's line of anamorphic widescreen lenses soon became the industry leader. In 1972, Panavision helped revolutionize filmmaking with the lightweight Panaflex 35 mm movie camera. The company has introduced other cameras such as the Millennium XL (1999) and the digital video Genesis (2004).

Panavision operates exclusively as a rental facility—the company owns its entire camera inventory, unlike most of its competitors.

== Early history ==
Robert Gottschalk founded Panavision in late 1954, in partnership with Richard Moore, Meredith Nicholson, Harry Eller, Walter Wallin, and William Mann; the company was formally incorporated in 1954. Panavision was established principally for the manufacture of anamorphic projection lenses to meet the growing demands of theaters showing CinemaScope films. At the time of Panavision's formation, Gottschalk owned a camera shop in Westwood Village, California, where many of his customers were cinematographers. A few years earlier, he and Moore—who worked with him in the camera shop—were experimenting with underwater photography; Gottschalk became interested in the technology of anamorphic lenses, which allowed him to get a wider field of view from his underwater camera housing. The technology was created during World War I to increase the field of view on tank periscopes; the periscope image was horizontally "squeezed" by the anamorphic lens. After it was unsqueezed by a complementary anamorphic optical element, the tank operator could see double the horizontal field of view without significant distortion. Gottschalk and Moore bought some of these lenses from C. P. Goerz, a New York optics company, for use in their underwater photography. As widescreen filmmaking became popular, Gottschalk saw an opportunity to provide anamorphic lenses to the film industry—first for projectors, and then for cameras. Nicholson, a friend of Moore, started working as a cameraman on early tests of anamorphic photography.

In the 1950s, the motion picture industry was threatened by the advent of television—TV kept moviegoers at home, reducing box office revenues. Film studios sought to lure audiences to theaters with attractions that television could not provide. These included a revival of color films, three-dimensional films, stereophonic sound, and widescreen movies. Cinerama was one of the first widescreen movie processes of the era. In its initial conception, the cumbersome system required three cameras for shooting and three synchronized projectors to display a picture on one wide, curved screen. Along with the logistical and financial challenges of tripling equipment usage and cost, the process led to distracting vertical lines between the three projected images, and more subtly, three separate vanishing points. Looking for a high-impact method of widescreen filmmaking that was cheaper, simpler, and less visually distracting, 20th Century Fox acquired the rights to a process it branded CinemaScope: in this system, the film was shot with anamorphic lenses. The film was then exhibited with a complementary anamorphic lens on the projector that expanded the image, creating a projected aspect ratio (the ratio of the image's width to its height) twice that of the image area on the physical frame of film. By the time the first CinemaScope movie—The Robe (1953)—was announced for production, Gottschalk, Moore and Nicholson had a demo reel of work with their anamorphic underwater system.

Gottschalk learned from one of his vendors that Bausch & Lomb, whom Fox had contracted to manufacture CinemaScope lenses, was having difficulty filling the lens orders for theatrical anamorphic projection equipment. He teamed up with William Mann, who provided optical manufacturing capability, and Walter Wallin, an optical physicist who was an acquaintance of Mann's. The anamorphic lens design they selected was prismatic rather than the cylindrical design of the Bausch & Lomb CinemaScope lens. This design meant the anamorphic lens extension factor—how much the image is horizontally unsquished—could be manually shifted, useful for projectionists switching between non-anamorphic ("flat" or "spherical") trailers and an anamorphic feature. The result was the anamorphozing system, designed by Wallin, used in the Panatar lens; the patent for the system was filed on August 11, 1954, and awarded five years later.

== Entering the market ==
Panavision's first product—the Super Panatar projection lens—debuted in March 1954. Priced at US$1,100 (equivalent to US$13,200 in 2025), it captured the market. The Super Panatar was a rectangular box that attached to the existing projection lens with a special bracket. Its variable prismatic system allowed a range of film formats to be shown from the same projector with a simple adjustment of the lens. Panavision improved on the Super Panatar with the Ultra Panatar, a lighter design that could be screwed directly to the front of the projection lens. Panavision lenses gradually replaced CinemaScope as the leading anamorphic system for theatrical projection.

In December 1954, the company created a specialized lens for film laboratories—the Micro Panatar. When fitted to an optical printer, the lens could create "flat" (non-anamorphic) prints from anamorphic negatives. This allowed films to be distributed to theaters that did not have an anamorphic system installed. Before the Micro Panatar, to accomplish this dual-platform release strategy, studios would sometimes shoot films with one anamorphic and one spherical camera, allowing non-widescreen theaters to exhibit the film. The cost savings of eliminating the second camera and making flat prints in post-production were enormous.

Another innovation of the era secured Panavision's leading position: the Auto Panatar camera lens for 35 mm anamorphic productions. Early CinemaScope camera lenses were notoriously problematic in close-ups with an optical aberration that was commonly known as "the mumps": a widening of the face due to a loss of anamorphic power as a subject approaches the lens. Because of the novelty of the new anamorphic process, early CinemaScope productions compensated for this aberration by avoiding tightly framed shots. As the anamorphic process became more popular, it became more problematic. Panavision invented a solution: adding a rotating lens element that moved in mechanical sync with the focus ring. This eliminated the distortion and allowed for natural close-up anamorphic photography. The Auto Panatar, released in 1958, was rapidly adopted, eventually making CinemaScope lenses obsolete. This innovation earned Panavision its first of 15 Academy Awards for technical achievement.

Screenshot of The Big Fisherman (1959), the first film released using the Super Panavision 70 process. The image shows the 2.20:1 aspect ratio in which the film was presented.

In 1954, MGM commissioned Panavision to develop a new widescreen camera system. The MGM camera system used 1930 Mitchell FC "Fox Grandeur" 70mm motion picture cameras, retooled for 65mm film and modern lenses. The resulting system used the retooled Grandeur 65 mm film camera in conjunction with the APO Panatar lens, which was an integrated anamorphic lens (as opposed to a standard prime lens with an anamorphoser mounted on it). This created a 1.25x anamorphic squeeze factor. Movies using the process had an astounding potential aspect ratio of 2.76:1 when exhibited with 70 mm anamorphic projection prints. Introduced as MGM Camera 65, the system was used on just a few films, the first of which was Raintree County (1957). However, the film was released only in 35 mm anamorphic prints because the circuit of 70 mm theaters was booked with Around the World in Eighty Days (1956), shot with the competing, non-anamorphic Todd-AO system. In January 1959, the posters for the 70 mm release of Disney's Sleeping Beauty carried the notation "Process lenses by Panavision" next to the Super Technirama 70 logo. The first film to be presented in 70 mm anamorphic—Ben-Hur—was released by MGM in 1959 under the trade name MGM Camera 65. Panavision also developed a non-anamorphic widescreen process called Super Panavision 70, which was essentially identical to Todd-AO. Super Panavision made its screen debut in 1959 with The Big Fisherman, released by Disney's Buena Vista division.

== Cameras ==
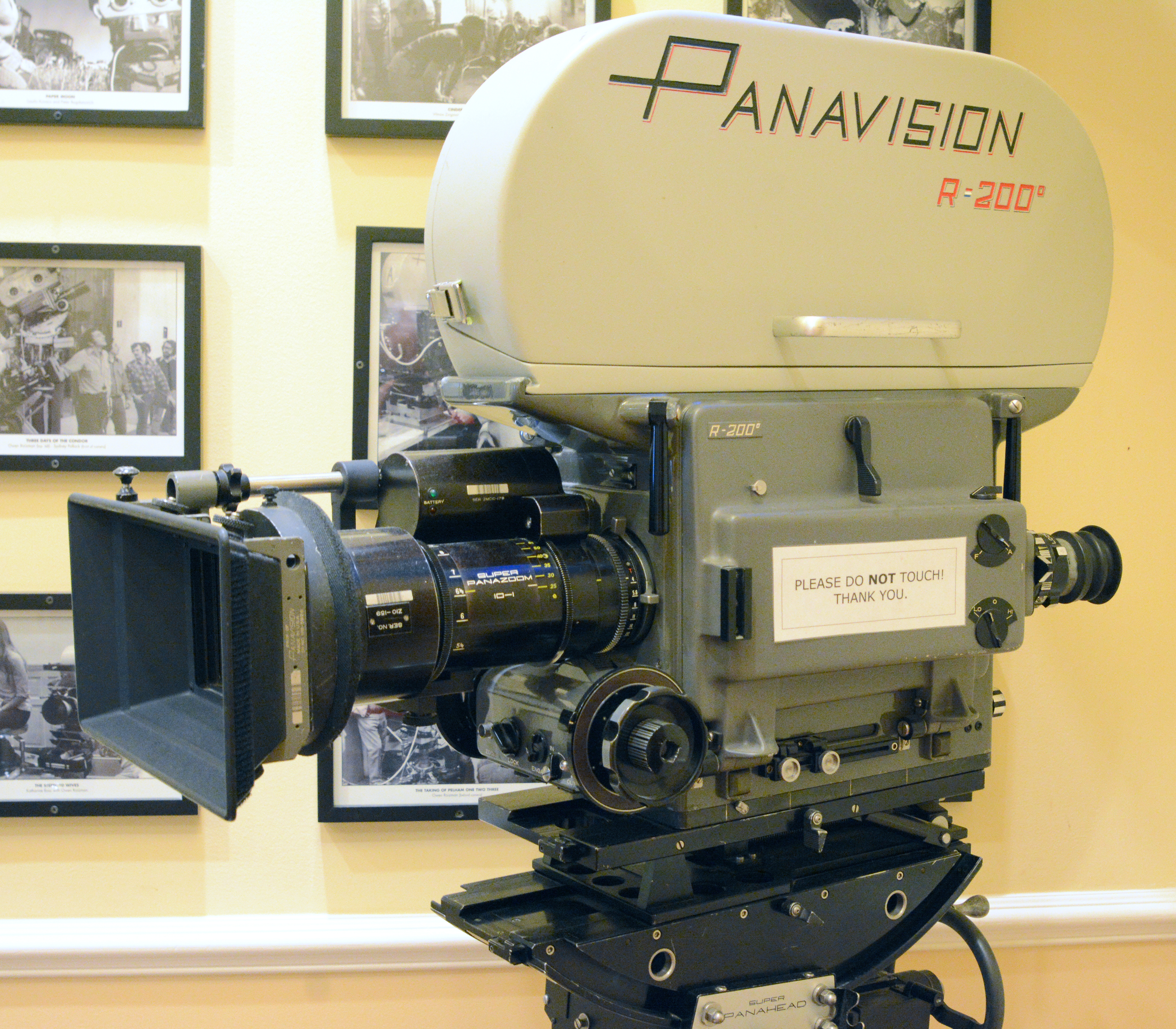
Panavision cinematic camera R-200°

By 1962, four of Panavision's founders had left the company to pursue private careers. That year, MGM's Camera 65 production of Mutiny on the Bounty went so far over budget that the studio liquidated assets to cover its costs. As a result of this liquidation, Panavision acquired MGM's camera equipment division, as well as the rights to the Camera 65 system it had developed for MGM; the technology was renamed Ultra Panavision. Only six more features were made with the system: It's a Mad, Mad, Mad, Mad World (1963), The Fall of the Roman Empire (1964), Battle of the Bulge (1965), The Greatest Story Ever Told (1965), The Hallelujah Trail (1965), and Khartoum (1966). The system was revived in 2015 for Quentin Tarantino's The Hateful Eight. As 1.25× anamorphosers for 70 mm projectors have become rare, most of the 70 mm prints of these films still in circulation are designed for projection with non-anamorphic, spherical lenses. The result is a 2.20:1 aspect ratio, rather than the broader ratio originally intended.

Although Fox insisted on maintaining CinemaScope for a time, some actors disliked the system. For Fox's 1965 production Von Ryan's Express, Frank Sinatra reputedly demanded that Auto Panatar lenses be used. Such pressures led Fox to completely abandon CinemaScope for Auto Panatars that year; Von Ryan's Express was the studio's first picture with Panavision lenses. To meet the extraordinary demand for Panavision projection lenses, Gottschalk had Bausch & Lomb CinemaScope lenses retrofitted into Panavision housings with a new astigmatic attachment, improving them greatly. This was revealed many years after Gottschalk's death; a lead designer from Bausch & Lomb, who had been involved with the original CinemaScope project, came to work as a designer for Panavision and—after opening some of the older lenses—figured out the secret.

The Panavision logo, designed by optical engineer Takuo Miyagishima, incorporates three aspect ratios into its design—4:3 (TV, standard "Academy" ratio) on the inside, 1.85:1 (standard U.S. widescreen) in the middle, and 2.40:1 (modern 35mm anamorphic) on the outside.

In the mid-1960s, Gottschalk altered Panavision's business model. The company now maintained its full inventory, making its lenses and the cameras it had acquired from MGM available only by rental. This meant that equipment could be maintained, modified, and regularly updated by the company. When Panavision eventually brought its own camera designs to market, it was relatively unconstrained by retrofitting and manufacturing costs, as it was not directly competing on sales price. This allowed Panavision to build cameras to new standards of durability.

The new business model required additional capital. To this end, the company was sold to Banner Productions in 1965, with Gottschalk remaining as president. Panavision would soon expand into markets beyond Hollywood, eventually including New York, Europe, Australia, Hong Kong, and Southeast Asia. Kinney National Company bought out Banner in 1968 and took over Warner Bros.-Seven Arts the following year, eventually renaming itself Warner Communications due to a financial scandal. Kinney/Warner's financial resources made possible a massive expansion in Panavision's inventory, as well as substantial leaps in research and development.

During this period, the company's R&D department focused on retrofitting the industry standard 35 mm camera, the Mitchell BNC. The first cameras produced by Panavision were Mitchell cameras, and all standard 35mm cameras made by Panavision to this day are based on the Mitchell movement.

The effort to develop a lighter, quieter camera with a reflex viewfinder led to the introduction of the Panavision Silent Reflex (PSR) in 1967. The camera could provide a shutter angle of up to 200 degrees. Many refinements were made to the PSR during the first few years after its introduction, and it soon became one of the most popular studio cameras in the world. Panavision also began manufacturing spherical lenses for 1.85:1 photography, garnering a significant share of the market.

In 1968, Panavision released a handheld 65 mm camera. By that time, however, the much cheaper process of blowing up 35 mm anamorphic films to 70 mm—introduced with The Cardinal (1964)—had made 65 mm production virtually obsolete.

In 1970, the last two feature films shot entirely with Super Panavision were released: Song of Norway and Ryan's Daughter. In the decades since, only a handful of films have been shot in 65 mm.

== Birth of Panaflex ==
Albert Mayer led the next major project: the creation of a lightweight reflex camera adaptable to either handheld or studio conditions. After four years of development, the Panaflex debuted in 1972. A revolutionary camera that operated quietly, the Panaflex eliminated the need for a cumbersome sound blimp, and could synchronize handheld work. The Panaflex also included a digital electronic tachometer and magazine motors for the take-up reel. Ted Post's Magnum Force (1973) and Steven Spielberg's The Sugarland Express (1974) were the first motion pictures filmed with the Panaflex. (Note: The Sugarland Express was filmed from December 1972 to March 1973, and released in April 1974, whilst Magnum Force was filmed from April to June 1973, and released in December of that year.)

During the 1970s, the Panaflex line was updated and marketed in new incarnations: the Panaflex X, Panaflex Lightweight (for steadicam), the high-speed Panastar, Panaflex Gold, and Panaflex G2. Panavision came out with a direct competitor to Tiffen's Steadicam stabilizer, the Panaglide harness. The Panacam, a video camera, was also brought out, though the company largely left the video field to others.

Robert Gottschalk died in 1982 at the age of 64. After Gottschalk's death, Warner Communications sold the company to a consortium headed by Ted Field, John Farrand, and Alan Hirschfield. With new ownership came sweeping changes to the company, which had stagnated. Optics testing was computerized and, in 1986, the new Platinum model camera was introduced. The next year—responding to a perceived demand for the resurrection of the 65 mm camera—development began on a new model. The company was sold to Lee International PLC for $100 million in 1987, but financing was overextended and ownership reverted to the investment firm Warburg Pincus two years later.

In 1989, the company brought out Primo, a new line of lenses. Designed with a consistent color match between all the different focal-length instruments in the line, these were also the sharpest lenses yet manufactured by Panavision. Six years later, Oscars were awarded to the company and to three of its employees for their work on the Primo 3:1 zoom lens: Iain Neil for the optical design, Rick Gelbard for the mechanical design, and Eric Dubberke for the lens's engineering. According to the AMPAS citation, "The high contrast and absence of flare, along with its ability to provide close focusing and to maintain constant image size while changing focus, make the Primo 3:1 Zoom Lens truly unique." In 1991, the company released its new 65 mm technology, System 65, though Arri had beaten it to market by two years with the Arriflex 765. The gauge was not widely readopted, and only two major Hollywood films were shot with the new 65 mm Panavision process: Far and Away (1992) and Kenneth Branagh's Hamlet (1996).

In 1992, Panavision launched a project to develop a camera that involved rethinking every aspect of the company's existing 35 mm system. Nolan Murdock and Albert Mayer Sr. headed up the design team. The new Millennium camera, replacing the Platinum as the company's flagship, was introduced in 1997. The Millennium XL came to the market in 1999 and was led by Al Mayer, Jr. It soon established itself as Panavision's new 35mm workhorse. The XL was the first product in Panavision history to win both an Academy Award and a Primetime Emmy Award within the first year of official release. The update to the XL, the XL2 was initially released in 2004. The first feature films to use these latter two systems were, respectively, The Perfect Storm (2000) and Just Like Heaven (2005). The XL series not only had a much smaller camera body—making it suitable for studio, handheld, and steadicam work—but also marked the first significant change to the film transport mechanism in the camera since the Panaflex: two smaller sprocket drums for feed and take-up (a design similar to the Moviecam and subsequent Arricam) instead of one large drum to do both. As of 2006, Panavision has no further plans to develop additional film camera models.

== Recent restructuring and acquisitions ==
In May 1997, Panavision announced it would be purchasing Visual Action Holdings PLC, a major film services group for $61m (£37.5m). The British-based company was formerly known as Samuelson Group PLC. The company operated three rental depots in the UK and was main agent for Panavision in France and Australia. It also had smaller rental operations in New Zealand, Singapore, Malaysia, and Indonesia. Crucially, it controlled three Panavision agencies in the US cities of Atlanta, Chicago, and Dallas (acquired from Victor Duncan, Inc.). Panavision CEO William C Scott said, "This transaction provides Panavision with a strong platform on which to grow the international side of our business and also completes our company-controlled distribution system in the US. Additionally, we will immediately expand our presence in key Southeast Asia markets, where television and film activity are expect to grow rapidly. Overall, the transaction enables us to control a true worldwide distribution network for Panavision's camera systems and related products, one of our most important strategic objectives."

Ronald Perelman's solely owned MacAndrews & Forbes Holdings (Mafco) acquired a majority interest in Panavision in 1998, via a Mafco subsidiary. After aborted attempts to create a film-style video camera in the 1970s and 1980s, Panavision joined the digital revolution in July 2000, establishing DHD Ventures in partnership with Sony. The new company's objective was to raise the quality of high definition digital video to the standards of top-level Hollywood motion-picture production.

This cooperative venture was established, largely at the instigation of George Lucas, to serve his designs for the Star Wars prequels. The collaboration resulted in the Sony HDW-F900 CineAlta HDCAM high definition video camera. Sony produced the electronics and a stand-alone version of the camera; Panavision supplied custom-designed high definition lenses, trademarked Primo Digital, and retrofitted the camera body to incorporate standard film camera accessories, facilitating the equipment's integration into existing crew equipment as a "digital cinema camera". This Panavision HD-900F, was used in the making of Lucasfilm's Star Wars: Episode II – Attack of the Clones (2002), described as "the first digital major feature film". Panavision's next step in the evolution of digital cinema cameras also involved collaboration between Sony and Panavision; this time, Panavision participated in all the stages of development. The aim was to create a system that could use the entire range of the company's 35 mm spherical lenses.

This led to the 2004 introduction of the Genesis HD—a full bandwidth (4:4:4) HD-SDI camera with improved colorimetry- and sensitometry-related specs. Its Super 35 mm film–sized recording area made it focally compatible with regular 35 mm lenses, giving it a true 35 mm depth of field. The camera's electronics—including its CCD (charge-coupled device) image sensor—and HDCAM SR record deck were manufactured by Sony. The chassis and mechanics were designed by a Panavision team led by Albert Mayer Jr., son of the Panaflex designer. The Genesis was first used on Superman Returns (2006) followed soon after by Flyboys (2006); But the comedy Scary Movie 4 (2006), shot afterward on a mixture of 35mm film and the Genesis, actually went into general release first because of the extensive visual effects work needed to complete both Flyboys and Superman Returns. Subsequent to the completion of major design work on the Genesis, Panavision bought out Sony's 49 percent share of DHD Ventures and fully consolidated it in September 2004.

During the same period, Panavision began acquiring related motion picture companies, including EFILM (acquired 2001; sold to Deluxe in full by 2004), Technovision France (Henryk Chroscicki) (2004), the motion picture camera-rental arm of the Canadian rental house William F. White International (2005), the digital camera rental company Plus8Digital (2006), the international lighting and equipment company AFM and the camera company One8Six (2006), and the camera inventory of Joe Dunton & Company (2007). On July 28, 2006, Mafco announced it was acquiring the remaining Panavision stock and returning the company to private status. A $345 million credit line from Bear Stearns and Credit Suisse was secured to finance the company's debt as well as to facilitate "global acquisitions." That same year, Mafco acquired Deluxe Entertainment Services Group.

In March 2010, citing a drop in production and difficulty servicing significant debt as a result of the 1998 Mafco transaction, shareholder MacAndrews & Forbes agreed to a debt restructuring arrangement with Panavision's creditors. Private equity firm Cerberus Capital was the lead investor in the deal, which involved a US$140 million reduction in debt and a US$40 million cash infusion. In return the majority shareholder Ronald Perelman was required to relinquish control of Panavision, and he no longer has any equity in the company. In June 2013, its creditors sued over an unpaid debt of $1.7 million, threatening to dissolve the company if they win.

On September 13, 2018, Saban Capital Acquisition Corp. announced the purchase of Panavision and Sim Video International in a $622 million cash and stock deal. The proposed transaction was intended to create a comprehensive production and post-production entity. Saban Capital Acquisition Corp. intended to change its name to Panavision Holdings Inc. and was expected to continue to trade on the Nasdaq stock exchange. Saban ended up terminating its deal to acquire Panavision on March 1, 2019.

== Panavision 3D ==
Panavision 3D was a system for presenting 3D film in a digital cinema. It was a passive stereoscopic 3D system that utilized spectral comb filters produced using thin-film optics technology. In such systems, the visible spectrum is broken into alternate bands of light that evenly span the entire visible spectrum.

In June 2012, the Panavision 3D system was discontinued by DVPO Theatrical, who marketed it on behalf of Panavision, citing "challenging global economic and 3D market conditions".

== See also ==
- List of motion picture film formats
- PV mount
