= List of Technirama films =

Films made using the Technirama or Super Technirama process are listed below. Note that the only difference between the two is the choice of gauge (35 mm or 70 mm) for the projection print: all Technirama and Super Technirama films are shot using the identical horizontal 35 mm anamorphic process. All Super Technirama films were also released on 35 mm prints and thus can also be considered Technirama films.

== Films ==
Films exhibited in Super Technirama are shown in bold.

- The Monte Carlo Story (1956)
- Davy (1957)
- Night Passage (1957)
- Escapade in Japan (1957)
- It Happened in Rome (1957)
- Legend of the Lost (1957)
- Sayonara (1957)
- Anna of Brooklyn (1958)
- Auntie Mame (1958)
- The Big Country (1958)
- Les Misérables (1958)
- The Love Specialist (1958)
- The Naked Maja (1958)
- Paris Holiday (1958)
- Seven Hills of Rome (1958)
- Tempest (1958)
- This Angry Age (1958)
- The Vikings (1958)
- For the First Time (1959)
- Honeymoon (1959)
- John Paul Jones (1959)
- The Miracle (1959)
- Il padrone delle ferriere (1959)
- **Sleeping Beauty** (1959)
- **Solomon and Sheba** (1959)
- Winter Holidays (1959)
- World by Night (1959)
- **Black Tights** (1960)
- Blood and Roses (1960)
- **Carthage in Flames** (1960)
- The Grass Is Greener (1960)
- Messalina (1960)
- **The Savage Innocents** (1960)
- **Spartacus** (1960)
- **The Trials of Oscar Wilde** (1960) – aka The Man with the Green Carnation or The Green Carnation
- Journey Beneath the Desert (1961)
- **Buddha** (1961)
- **El Cid** (1961)
- The Hellions (1961)
- **Hercules and the Captive Women** (1961) – aka Hercules Conquers Atlantis
- **King of Kings** (1961)
- **La Fayette** (1961) – presented in 70 mm Cinerama in Europe only
- **World by Night No. 2** (1961)
- **Barabbas** (1961)
- The Queen's Guards (1961) – filmed in Technirama but prints given a CinemaScope credit
- Wonderful New York (1962) – short subject
- Beach Casanova (1962)
- The Best of Enemies (1962)
- The Golden Arrow (1962)
- **The Great Wall** (1962) – advertised as Super 70 Technirama
- Gypsy (1962)
- **Madame Sans-Gêne** (1962)
- The Music Man (1962)
- My Geisha (1962)
- **Pontius Pilate** (1962)
- Taiheiyo senso to himeyuri butai (1962)
- **55 Days at Peking** (1963)
- **Imperial Venus** (1963)
- **The Leopard** (1963) – US prints (all 35mm) given CinemaScope credit
- **The Long Ships** (1963)
- The Pink Panther (1963)
- **Circus World** (1964) – presented in 70 mm Cinerama
- **The Golden Head** (1964) – presented in 70 mm Cinerama in Europe only
- **O Santo Módico** (1964)
- **Zulu** (1964)
- Le Corsaire (1965) – short subject
- Shellarama (1965) – aka Push Button Go; short subject
- **Clint the Stranger** (1967)
- **Custer of the West** (1967) – presented in 70 mm Cinerama
- **The Black Cauldron** (1985)
- Army of Darkness (1992) – some effects shots
- Chapter 51 (2026) - some sequences
