= Colonel Stewart =

Colonel Stewart may refer to:

- Colonel William Stewart of Houston, (d. c. 1605), Scottish soldier and diplomat.
- Colonel J. D. H. Stewart, (d. 1884), British soldier.
