= Super Technirama 70 =

70 mm version of the Technirama process

Super Technirama 70 was the marketing name for a special type of deluxe film exhibition that was most popular in the 1960s. It was the 70 mm version of the Technirama exhibition format.

Unlike Super Panavision 70 and Ultra Panavision 70, Super Technirama 70 films were not actually photographed on 65 mm film stock, but rather a specialized 35 mm film process that was then blown up to 70 mm prints for use on curved Cinerama-type screens.

== History and description ==
In the late 1950s, 70 mm film exhibitions were very popular, due to the large screen size and thunderous soundtrack. In 1959, Walt Disney was interested in using a prestigious 70 mm release of his film Sleeping Beauty, and this was the first use of Super Technirama 70. The same year, the live action Solomon and Sheba was released with Super Technirama 70 prints. As the technique was still relatively new, the films only credited it as traditional Technirama, however the promotional materials heavily advertised the new technology.

A big advantage to Super Technirama 70 was that the prints were fully compatible with Todd-AO and the other systems using a spherical 65mm negative. All Super Technirama 70 pictures were photographed in the 35 mm 8-perforation Technirama process and optically un-squeezed and enlarged to 70 mm 5-perforation prints for theatrical presentation. A few of the Super Technirama 70 films (including Circus World and Custer of the West) were presented in 70 mm Cinerama at some venues. Special optics were used to project the 70 mm prints onto a deeply curved screen to mimic the effect of the original 3-strip Cinerama process.

== Films ==
The following films were exhibited in the Super Technirama 70 format:

- Sleeping Beauty (1959)
- Solomon and Sheba (1959)
- Spartacus (1960)
- King of Kings (1961)
- El Cid (1961)
- The Savage Innocents (1961)
- La Fayette (1961)
- Black Tights (1961)
- Barabbas (1961)
- Imperial Venus (1962)
- 55 Days at Peking (1963)
- Hercules and the Conquest of Atlantis (1963)
- The Pink Panther (1963)
- Circus World (1964)
- The Long Ships (1964)
- Zulu (1964)
- The Golden Head (1965)
- Le Corsaire (1965)
- The Great Wall (1965)
- Shellarama (1965)
- Custer of the West (1967)
- The Black Cauldron (1985)

== See also ==
- List of Technirama films
- List of 70 mm films
- Cinerama
- Super Panavision 70
- Technirama
- Todd-AO
- Ultra Panavision 70
