= Cinerama =

Widescreen, curved screen projection process

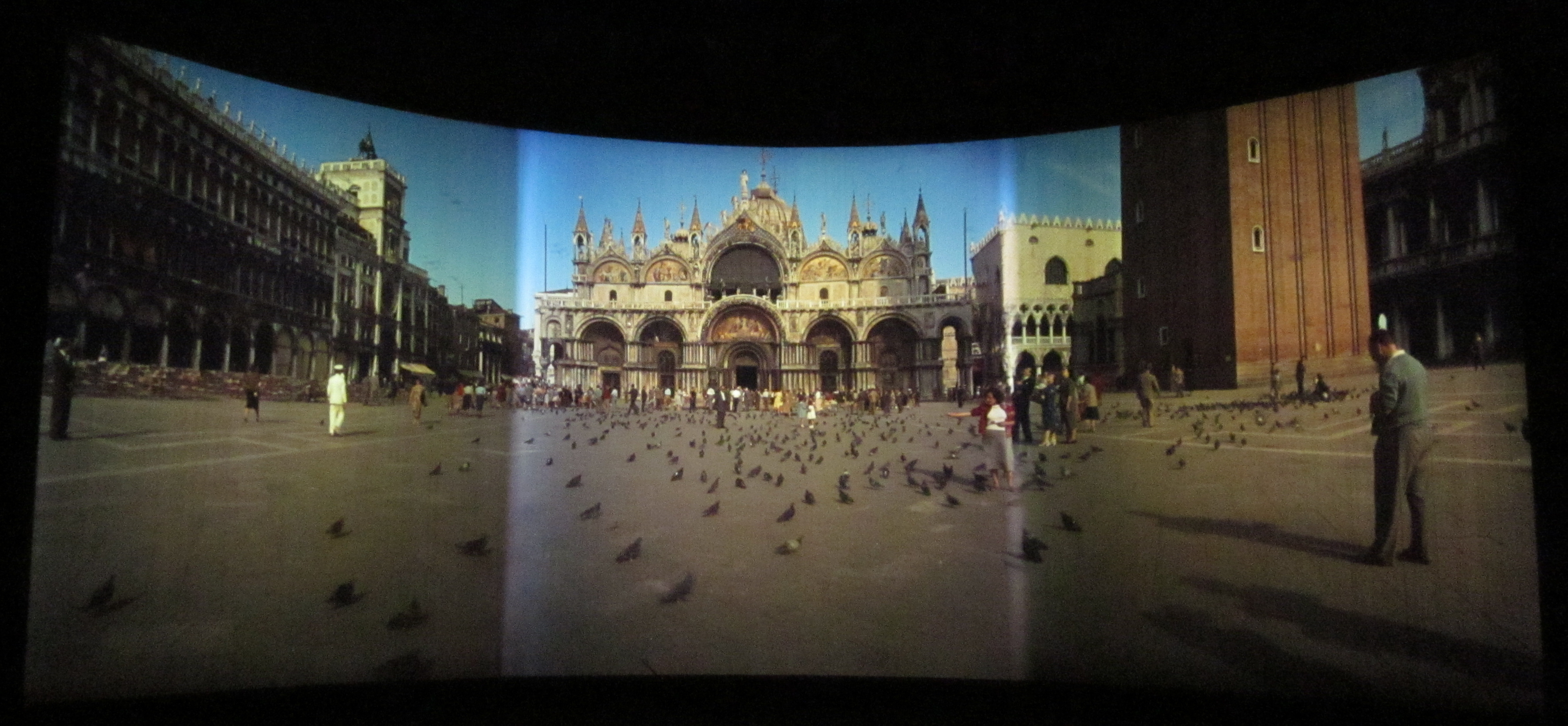
- Scene from This Is Cinerama
- Type: Filmmaking technology
- Inventor: Fred Waller
- Inception: 1952
- Manufacturer: Cinerama Corporation

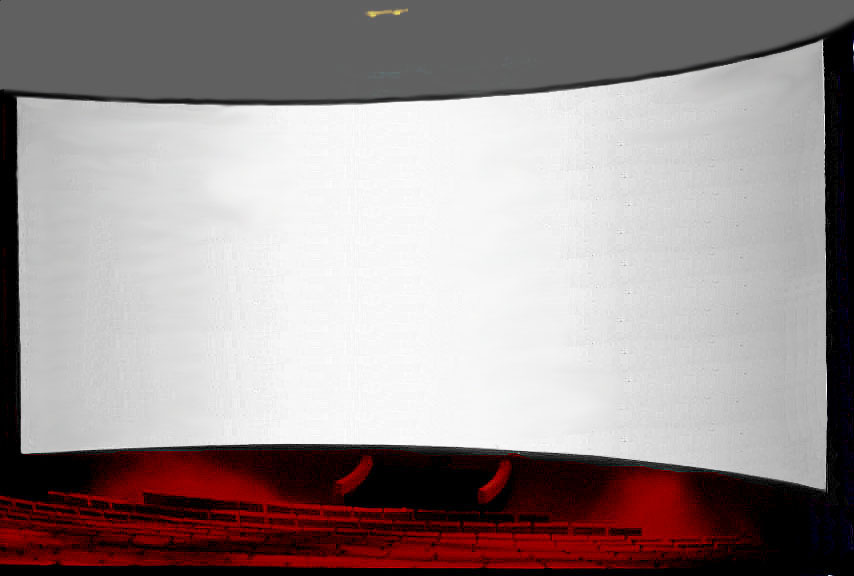
Original Cinerama screen in the Bellevue Cinerama, Amsterdam (1965–2005) 17-meter curved screen removed in 1978 for 15-meter normal screen.

Cinerama is a widescreen process that originally projected images simultaneously from three synchronized 35 mm projectors onto a huge, deeply curved screen, subtending 146-degrees of arc. The trademarked process was marketed by the Cinerama corporation. It was the first of several novel processes introduced during the 1950s when the movie industry was reacting to competition from television. Cinerama was presented to the public as a theatrical event, with reserved seating and printed programs, and audience members often dressed in their best attire for the evening.

The Cinerama projection screen, rather than being a continuous surface like most screens, is made of hundreds of individual vertical strips of standard perforated screen material, each about 7/8 inch (22 millimeters) wide, with each strip angled to face the audience, to prevent light scattered from one end of the deeply curved screen from reflecting across the screen and washing out the image on the opposite end. The display is accompanied by a high-quality, seven-track discrete, directional, surround-sound system.

The original system involved shooting with three synchronized cameras sharing a single shutter. This process was later abandoned in favor of a system using a single camera and 70 mm (2.76 in) prints. The latter system lost the 146-degree field of view of the original three-strip system, and its resolution was markedly lower. Three-strip Cinerama did not use anamorphic lenses, although two of the systems used to produce the 70mm prints (Ultra Panavision 70 and Super Technirama 70) did employ anamorphic lenses, 35 millimetres (1.38 in) anamorphic reduction prints were produced for exhibition in theatres with anamorphic CinemaScope-compatible projection lenses.

== History ==
=== Process and production ===
Cinerama was invented by Fred Waller (1886–1954) and languished in the laboratory for several years before Waller, joined by Hazard "Buzz" Reeves, brought it to the attention of Lowell Thomas who, first with Mike Todd and later with Merian C. Cooper, produced a commercially viable demonstration of Cinerama that opened on Broadway on September 30, 1952. The film, titled This Is Cinerama, was received with enthusiasm. It was the outgrowth of many years of development. A forerunner was the triple-screen final sequence in the silent Napoléon (1927) directed by Abel Gance; Gance's classic was considered lost in the 1950s however, known of only by hearsay, and Waller could not have viewed it. Waller had earlier developed an eleven-projector system called "Vitarama" at the Petroleum Industry exhibit in the 1939 New York World's Fair. A five-camera version, the Waller Gunnery Trainer, was used during the Second World War.

The word Cinerama combines cinema with panorama, the origin of all the -orama neologisms (the word panorama comes from the Greek πᾶν, pan 'all', and ὅραμα, orama 'view', 'that which is seen', 'a sight', 'a spectacle'). It was suggested in the documentary Cinerama Adventure (2002) that Cinerama could have been an intentional anagram of the word American; but Dick Babish, present at the meeting when it was named, says this is "purely accidental, however delightful."

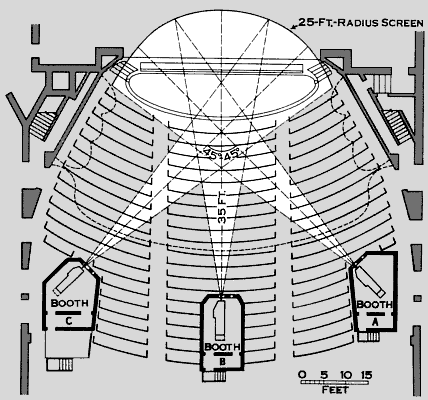
How Cinerama is projected using three projectors

The photographic system used three interlocked 35 mm cameras equipped with 27 mm lenses, approximately the focal length of the human eye. Each camera photographed one-third of the picture shooting in a crisscross pattern, the right camera shooting the left part of the image, the left camera shooting the right part of the image, and the center camera shooting straight ahead. The three cameras were mounted as one unit, set at 48 degrees to each other. A single rotating shutter in front of the three lenses assured simultaneous exposure on each of the films. The three angled cameras photographed an image that was not only three times as wide as a standard film but covered 146 degrees of arc, close to the human field of vision, including peripheral vision. The image was photographed six sprocket holes high, rather than the usual four used in conventional 35 mm processes. The picture was photographed and projected at 26 frames per second rather than the usual 24 FPS.

According to film historian Martin Hart, in the original Cinerama system "the camera aspect ratio [was] 2.59∶1" with an "optimum screen image, with no architectural constraints, [of] about 2.65∶1, with the extreme top and bottom cropped slightly to hide anomalies". He further comments on the unreliability of "numerous websites and other resources that will tell you that Cinerama had an aspect ratio of up to 3∶1."

In theaters, Cinerama film was projected from three projection booths arranged in the same crisscross pattern as the cameras. They projected onto a deeply curved screen, the outer thirds of which were made of over 1,100 strips of material mounted on "louvers" like a vertical Venetian blind, to prevent light projected to each end of the screen from reflecting to the opposite end and washing out the image.

This was a big-ticket, reserved-seats spectacle, and the Cinerama projectors were adjusted carefully and operated skillfully. To prevent adjacent images from creating an over-illuminated vertical band where they overlapped on the screen, vibrating combs in the projectors, called "jiggolos", alternately blocked the image from one projector and then the other; the overlapping area thus received no more total illumination than the rest of the screen, and the rapidly alternating images within the overlap smoothed out the visual transition between adjacent image "panels."

Great care was taken to match color and brightness when producing the prints. Nevertheless, the seams between panels were usually noticeable. Optical limitations with the design of the camera itself meant that if distant scenes joined perfectly, closer objects did not. (parallax error). A nearby object might split into two as it crossed the seams. To avoid calling attention to the seams, scenes were often composed with unimportant objects such as trees or posts at the seams, and action was blocked to center actors within panels. This gave a distinctly "triptych-like" appearance to the composition even when the seams themselves were not obvious. It was often necessary to have actors in different sections "cheat" where they looked to appear to be looking at each other in the final projected picture. Enthusiasts say the seams were not obtrusive; detractors disagree. Lowell Thomas, an investor in the company with Mike Todd, was still raving about the process in his memoirs thirty years later.

==== Sound system ====
In addition to the visual impact of the image, Cinerama was one of the first processes to use multitrack magnetic sound. The system, developed by Hazard E. Reeves, one of the Cinerama investors, played back from a fully coated 35 mm magnetic film with seven tracks of sound. There were five speakers behind the screen fed by tracks one to five, and arrays of speakers on the left, right and rear walls. A sound engineer directed the sound between the left, right and rear speakers according to a cue sheet. Either tracks six and seven were directed to the left and right of the theater respectively, or track seven was directed to the rear and track six to both sides. This manual steering of the sound was abandoned after the travelogues. For the two MGM features, only the left and right speaker arrays were used.

The projectors and sound system were originally synchronized by a system involving a rotating black disk with 32 white gradations on it, which was attached to the sound reproducer. Each time the disk completed a revolution, an electrical pulse was sent to slave units on the three projectors. If all four units were in sync, a green light would flash. If not, a timing motor would accelerate or decelerate the film in the affected projector by the required amount. This system was later replaced by one using selsyn motors to keep the projectors and sound in sync.

=== Drawbacks ===
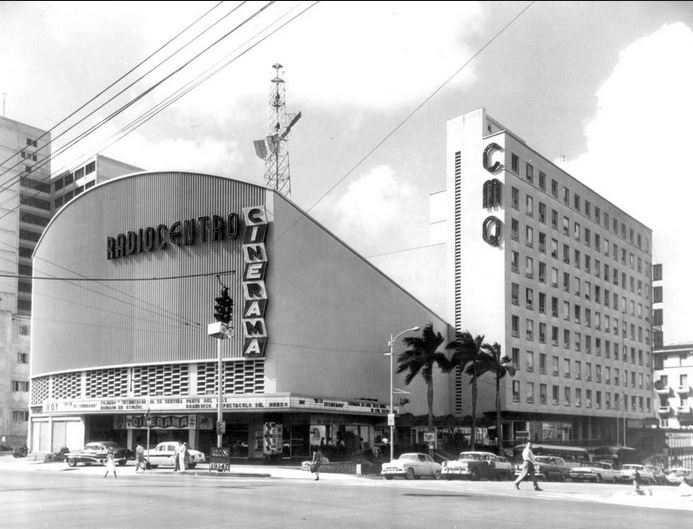
Radiocentro CMQ Building, Havana, Cuba

The Cinerama system had some obvious drawbacks. If one of the films should break, it had to be repaired with a black slug exactly equal to the missing footage. Otherwise, the corresponding frames would have had to be cut from the other three films (the other two picture films plus the soundtrack film) in order to preserve synchronization. The use of zoom lenses was impossible since the three images would no longer match. Perhaps the greatest limitation of the process is that the picture looks natural only from within a rather limited "sweet spot." Viewed from outside the sweet spot, the picture can look distorted. Furthermore, while the screen was a continuous curve, the projected image itself was a polygonal triptych, which often resulted in the combined image appearing bent or creased. Finally, any misalignment of the two intersections of the three films was quite noticeable which prompted the use of a vertical element at these intersections (tree, lamp pole, etc.) to hide this flaw.

The system also required a bit of improvisation on the part of the film producers. It was not possible to film any scene where any part of the scene was close to the camera, as the fields of view no longer met exactly. Further, any close-up material had a noticeable bend in it at the joins. It was also difficult to film actors talking to each other where both were in shot, because when they looked at each other when filmed, the resultant image showed the actors appearing to look past each other, particularly if they appeared on different films. Early directors sidestepped this latter problem by only shooting one actor at a time and cutting between them. Later directors worked out where to have the actors looking to create a natural shot. Each actor was required not to look at their fellow actor, but at a predetermined cue place instead.

Finally, the three individual films would jitter and weave slightly as the films moved through the projectors. This normal frame-to-frame movement is typically imperceptible to cinema audiences where only a single projector is in use. However, in Cinerama, this resulted in the center picture constantly moving slightly relative to each of the side pictures. The shifting displacements were perceivable at the two points where the center picture met the side pictures, resulting in what appeared to many viewers to be jittering vertical lines at one-third and two-thirds of the way across the screen as the two touching images constantly moved around relative to each other. Cinerama projectors used a device to slightly blur the join lines to make the jitter less noticeable. Future systems such as Circle-Vision 360° would correct for this by having masked areas between the screens. The jitters continued, but viewers were less aware of them with the adjoining pictures no longer so close together.

The impact these films had on the big screen cannot be assessed from television or video, or even from 'scope prints, which marry the three images together with the seams clearly visible. Because they were designed to be seen on a curved screen, the geometry looks distorted on television; someone walking from left to right appears to approach the camera at an angle, move away at an angle, and then repeat the process on the other side of the screen.

=== Premiere ===
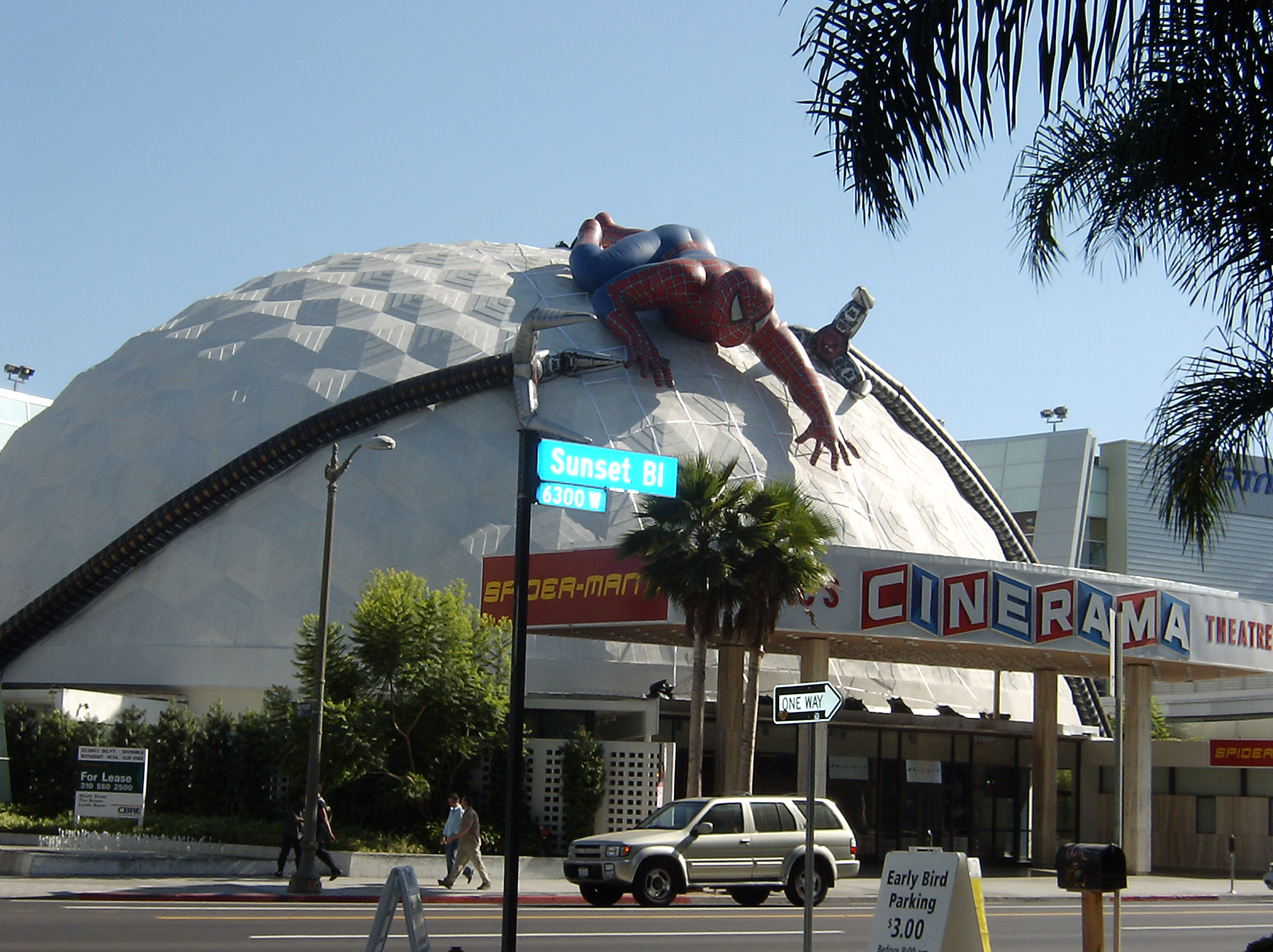
The Cinerama dome in Los Angeles

The first Cinerama film, This Is Cinerama, premiered on September 30, 1952, at the Broadway Theatre in New York City. The New York Times judged it to be front-page news. Notables attending included New York Governor Thomas E. Dewey, violinist Fritz Kreisler, James A. Farley, Metropolitan Opera manager Rudolf Bing, NBC chairman David Sarnoff, CBS chairman William S. Paley; Broadway composer Richard Rodgers, and Hollywood mogul Louis B. Mayer.

In The New York Times a few days after the system premiered, film critic Bosley Crowther wrote:

Somewhat the same sensations that the audience in Koster and Bial's Music Hall must have felt on that night, years ago, when motion pictures were first publicly flashed on a large screen were probably felt by the people who witnessed the first public showing of Cinerama the other night ... the shrill screams of the ladies and the pop-eyed amazement of the men when the huge screen was opened to its full size and a thrillingly realistic ride on a roller-coaster was pictured upon it, attested to the shock of the surprise. People sat back in spellbound wonder as the scenic program flowed across the screen. It was really as though most of them were seeing motion pictures for the first time ... the effect of Cinerama in this its initial display is frankly and exclusively "sensational", in the literal sense of that word.

While observing that the system "may be hailed as providing a new and valid entertainment thrill," Crowther expressed some skeptical reserve, saying "the very size and sweep of the Cinerama screen would seem to render it impractical for the story-telling techniques now employed in film ... It is hard to see how Cinerama can be employed for intimacy. But artists found ways to use the movie. They may well give us something brand-new here."

A technical review by Waldemar Kaempffert published in The New York Times on the same day hailed the system. He praised the stereophonic sound system and noted that "the fidelity of the sounds was irreproachable. Applause in La Scala sounded like the clapping of hands and not like pieces of wood slapped together". He noted, however, that "There is nothing new about these stereophonic sound effects. The Bell Telephone Laboratories and Professor Harold Burris-Meyer of Stevens Institute of Technology demonstrated the underlying principles years ago." Kaempffert also noted:

There is no question that Waller has made a notable advance in cinematography. But it must be said that at the sides of his gigantic screen there is some distortion more noticeable in some parts of the house than in others. The three projections were admirably blended, yet there were visible bands of demarcation on the screen.

=== Venues ===
Although existing theatres were adapted to show Cinerama films, in 1961 and 1962 the non-profit Cooper Foundation of Lincoln, Nebraska, designed and built three near-identical circular "super-Cinerama" theaters in Glendale, Colorado, near Denver; St. Louis Park, Minnesota (a Minneapolis suburb); and Omaha, Nebraska. They were considered the finest venues in which to view Cinerama films. The theaters were designed by architect Richard L. Crowther of Denver, a fellow of the American Institute of Architects.

The first such theater, the Cooper Theater, built in Glendale, near Denver, featured a 146-degree louvered screen (measuring 105 by 35 feet [32 by 11 meters]), 814 seats, courtesy lounges on the sides of the theatre for relaxation during intermission (including concessions and smoking facilities), and a ceiling which routed air and heating through small vent slots to inhibit noise from the building's ventilation equipment. It was demolished in 1994 to make way for a Barnes & Noble.

The second, also called the Cooper Theater, was built in St. Louis Park at 5755 Wayzata Boulevard. The last film presented there was Dances with Wolves in January 1991. At that time the Cooper was considered the flagship in the Plitt theatre chain. Efforts were made to preserve the theatre, but at the time it did not qualify for national or state historical landmark status (as it was not more than fifty years old) nor were there local preservation laws. It was torn down in 1992. An office building occupies the site today.

The third super-Cinerama, the Indian Hills Theater, was built in Omaha, Nebraska. It closed on September 28, 2000, as a result of the bankruptcy of Carmike Cinemas and the final film presented was the rap music-drama Turn It Up. The theater was demolished on August 20, 2001.

A fourth, the Kachina Cinerama Theater, was built in Scottsdale, Arizona by Harry L. Nace Theatres on Scottsdale Road opened on November 10, 1960. It seated 600 people. It later became a Harkins theater, then closed in 1989 to make way for the Scottsdale Galleria. Venues outside the United States included the Regent Plaza cinema in Melbourne, Australia, which was adapted for Cinerama in 1960 to show This Is Cinerama and Seven Wonders of the World. The Imperial Theatre in Montreal and the Glendale in Toronto were the Canadian homes for Cinerama.

A Cinerama temporary venue was built on the location of the 1958 World Fair in Brussels, for the whole duration of the fair, from April until October 1958.

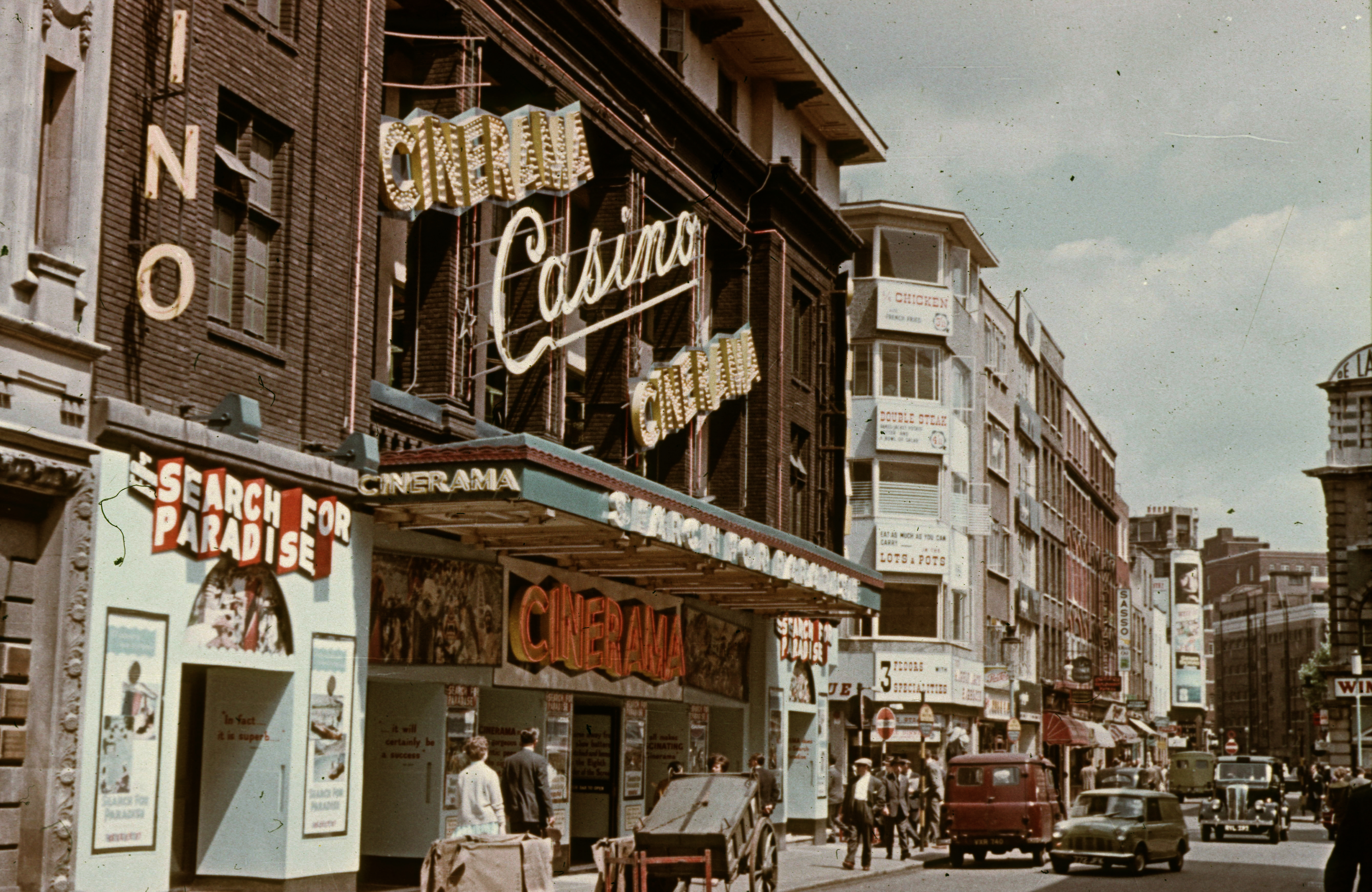
A 1960 picture of the Prince Edward Theatre in central London. As the Casino Cinema, it showed Cinerama films between 1954 and 1974, before reverting to use as a live theatre.

This Is Cinerama received its London premiere on September 30, 1954, at the Casino Cinerama Theatre (now the Prince Edward Theatre), Old Compton Street, formerly a live theatre. The film ran for 16 months and was followed by the other three-strip travelogues. How the West Was Won had its World Premiere at the Casino on November 1, 1962, and ran until April 1965 after which the Casino switched to 70 mm single lens Cinerama. London had two other three-strip venues, making it the only city in the world with three Cinerama theatres. These were the Coliseum Cinerama, from July 1963, and the Royalty Cinerama from November 1963, like the Casino, both converted live venues. The Coliseum played only one film in three-strip (The Wonderful World of the Brothers Grimm) before switching to a 70 mm single lens in December 1963, and the Royalty had two runs of Brothers Grimm separated by a run of The Best of Cinerama before also switching to 70 mm single lens in mid-1964. These London venues were directly operated by Cinerama themselves; elsewhere in the UK three-strip Cinerama venues were operated by the two main UK circuits, ABC at ABC Bristol Road, Birmingham and Coliseum, Glasgow, Rank at Gaumont, Birmingham, and Queens, Newcastle and by independents at the Park Hall, Cardiff, Theatre Royal, Manchester and Abbey, Liverpool. Most of these conversions of existing cinemas came just as Cinerama was switching to single lenses and thus had short lives as three-strip venues before switching to 70 mm.

Roman Cinerama Theater (now Isetann Cinerama Recto) at Quezon Boulevard in Recto, Manila and Nation Cinerama Theater in Araneta Center, Quezon City were the only Cinerama theaters built in the Philippines in the 1960s. Both theaters are now defunct as Roman Super Cinerama burned down in the late 1970s and became Isetann Cinerama Recto in 1988 while Nation Cinerama closed down in the early 1970s it is now Manhattan Parkview Residences built by Megaworld Corporation.

The last Cinerama theater built was the Southcenter Theatre in 1970, opening near the Southcenter Mall of Tukwila, Washington. It closed in 2001.

Cinerama also purchased RKO-Stanley Warner (consisting of theaters formerly owned by Warner Bros. and RKO Pictures) in 1970.

=== Stanley Warner ===
Stanley Warner Corporation acquired 35 percent of the company – as well as the exhibition, production and distribution rights to Cinerama – in 1953 during the production of Seven Wonders of the World, which was planned as the follow-up feature.

== Single-film "Cinerama" ==
The high cost and technical limitations of three-camera widescreen filmmaking led to the discontinuation of the original Cinerama process after How the West Was Won. Certain sequences in How the West Was Won were filmed using the Ultra Panavision 70, particularly action scenes that were difficult to shoot with the three-panel Cinerama presentation. Following the move away from three-camera filmmaking, Cinerama's Russian Adventure (1966), an American-Soviet co-production assembled from footage of several Soviet films shot in the three-film Kinopanorama format, received a three-panel Cinerama presentation at McVickers' Cinerama Theatre in Chicago.

Cinerama continued through the rest of the 1960s as a brand name used initially with the Ultra Panavision 70 widescreen process (which yielded a similar 2.76∶1 aspect ratio to the original Cinerama, although it did not simulate the 146° field of view). Optically "rectified" prints and special lenses were used to project the 70 mm prints onto the curved screen. The films shot in Ultra Panavision for single lens Cinerama presentation were It's a Mad, Mad, Mad, Mad World (1963), Battle of the Bulge (1965), The Greatest Story Ever Told (1965), The Hallelujah Trail (1965) and Khartoum (1966).

The less wide Super Panavision 70 was used to film the Cinerama presentations Grand Prix (1966); 2001: A Space Odyssey (1968), which also featured scenes shot in Todd-AO (and MCS-70); Ice Station Zebra (1968); and Krakatoa, East of Java (1969), which also featured scenes shot in Todd-AO.

The other 70 mm systems used for single film Cinerama (Sovscope 70 and MCS-70) were similar to Super Panavision 70. Some films were shot in the Super Technirama 70 process, using 35 mm negatives enlarged to 70 mm prints for Cinerama release, including Circus World (1964) and Custer of the West (1967).

In the late 1960s and early 1970s, Cinerama also operated as a film distribution company. This Is Cinerama was re-released in 1972 in a single-film format, rather than its original three-strip presentation.

== Extant venues ==
In recent years, surviving and new Cinerama prints have been screened at the following venues:

- The Pictureville Cinema at the National Science and Media Museum in Bradford, England, beginning in June 1993 As of 2023, the Pictureville Cinema continues to hold periodic screenings of three-projector Cinerama movies.
- The New Neon Cinema in Dayton, Ohio from 1996 to 2000, presented by The Cinerama Preservation Society, Inc.
- The refurbished Seattle Cinerama in Seattle, from 1999 to 2020. In 1998, Microsoft co-founder Paul Allen purchased Seattle's Martin Cinerama, which then underwent a major restoration/upgrade to become the Seattle Cinerama. In 2023, the theater was purchased by the Seattle International Film Festival (SIFF) and reopened on December 14, 2023, as "SIFF Cinema Downtown" due to trademark issues with the "Cinerama" name.
- Pacific Theatres' Cinerama Dome in Hollywood, from 2002 to 2020. The Cinerama Dome was designed for the three-projector system but never actually had it installed until recent years as it opened with the first of the single film 70 mm Cinerama films, It's a Mad, Mad, Mad, Mad World (1963).
- Cinerama restorationist and former Canadian broadcast engineer, Tom H. March's Calgary basement.
- Biograf Panora, Malmö

== Legacy ==
The modern Cinerama company exists as an entity of the Pacific Theatres chain.

Cinerama Adventure (2003), a documentary directed by David Strohmaier, looked at the history of the Cinerama process, as well as digitally recreating the Cinerama experience via clips of true Cinerama films (using transfers from original Cinerama prints). Turner Entertainment (via Warner Bros.) has struck new Cinerama prints of How the West Was Won (1962) for exhibition in true Cinerama theatres around the world.

In 2008, a Blu-ray disc of How The West Was Won was released, offering a recreation of Cinerama for home viewing. The three Cinerama images were digitally stitched together so that the resulting image does not have the visible seams of older copies. Furthermore, as a second viewing option, 3D mapping technology was used to produce an image that approximates the curved screen, called "SmileBox".

Since then, other Cinerama films, including The Wonderful World of the Brothers Grimm, The Golden Head, and South Seas Adventure have also had "SmileBox" edition Blu-ray home-media releases.

On January 14, 2012, an original Cinerama camera was used to film a sequence at the Lasky-DeMille Barn, the original home to Famous Players–Lasky, later to be renamed Paramount Pictures. This was the first film photographed in the Cinerama process in almost 50 years. This sequence is part of a 12-minute production filmed entirely in the three-panel process. The new film, In the Picture, was presented at a Cinerama festival at the Cinerama Dome in Hollywood, California on September 30, 2012.

== Cinerama successors ==
Cinerama successors, Todd-AO, CinemaScope, and the various 70 mm formats, all attempted to equal or surpass its grandeur while avoiding its problems to greater or lesser degrees of success. The large format IMAX system continues the tradition, although its screen is taller and often less wide.

== Features ==
All but two of the feature-length films produced using the original three-strip Cinerama process were travelogues or episodic documentaries such as This Is Cinerama (1952), the first film shot in Cinerama. Other travelogues presented in Cinerama were Cinerama Holiday (1955), Seven Wonders of the World (1955), Search for Paradise (1957) and South Seas Adventure (1958). There was also one commercial short, Renault Dauphine (1960).

Even as the Cinerama travelogues were beginning to lose audiences in the late 50s, the spectacular travelogue Windjammer (1958) was released in a competing process called Cinemiracle which claimed to have less noticeable dividing lines on the screen thanks to the reflection of the side images off mirrors. (This also allowed all three projectors to be in the same booth.) Due to the small number of Cinemiracle theatres, specially converted prints of Windjammer were shown in Cinerama theaters in cities which did not have Cinemiracle theaters, and ultimately Cinerama bought up the process.

Only two films with traditional story lines were made, The Wonderful World of the Brothers Grimm and How the West Was Won. In order to make these films compatible with single film systems for later standard releases, they were shot at 24 frames/s, not the 26 frames/s of traditional Cinerama.

Feature films advertised as being presented "in Cinerama"
Title	Year	Filmed in	Notes
This Is Cinerama	1952	3-Strip Cinerama	re-released in 1972 in 70 mm Cinerama
Cinerama Holiday	1955	3-Strip Cinerama	
Seven Wonders of the World	1956	3-Strip Cinerama	
Search for Paradise	1957	3-Strip Cinerama	
South Seas Adventure	1958	3-Strip Cinerama	
Windjammer	1958	3-strip Cinemiracle	Later exhibited in Cinerama
The Wonderful World of the Brothers Grimm	1962	3-Strip Cinerama	
Holiday in Spain	1962	Todd-70	A re-edited version of Scent of Mystery; converted to 3-strip Cinemiracle and exhibited in both Cinemiracle and Cinerama
How The West Was Won	1962	3-strip Cinerama	Some sequences were filmed in Ultra Panavision 70
Flying Clipper	1962	MCS-70	Presented in 70 mm Cinerama
The Best of Cinerama	1963	3-Strip Cinerama	
It's a Mad, Mad, Mad, Mad World	1963	Ultra Panavision 70	Presented in 70 mm Cinerama
Circus World	1964	Super Technirama 70	Presented in 70 mm Cinerama
The Golden Head	1965	Super Technirama 70	Presented in 70 mm Cinerama in Europe only
La Fayette	1965	Super Technirama 70	Presented in 70 mm Cinerama in Europe only
Chronicle of Flaming Years	1965	Sovscope 70	Presented in 70 mm Cinerama in Europe only
The Black Tulip	1965	MCS-70	Presented in 70 mm Cinerama in Europe only
The Greatest Story Ever Told	1965	Ultra Panavision 70	Presented in 70 mm Cinerama
The Hallelujah Trail	1965	Ultra Panavision 70	Presented in 70 mm Cinerama
Battle of the Bulge	1965	Ultra Panavision 70	Presented in 70 mm Cinerama
Cinerama's Russian Adventure	1966	Kinopanorama	Presented in both 3-strip and 70 mm Cinerama
Khartoum	1966	Ultra Panavision 70	Presented in 70 mm Cinerama
Grand Prix	1966	Super Panavision 70 with some sequences in MCS-70	Presented in 70 mm Cinerama
Custer of the West	1967	Super Technirama 70	Presented in 70 mm Cinerama
2001: A Space Odyssey	1968	Super Panavision 70 with some scenes in Todd-AO and MCS-70	Presented in 70 mm Cinerama
Ice Station Zebra	1968	Super Panavision 70	Presented in 70 mm Cinerama
Krakatoa, East of Java	1969	Super Panavision 70 and Todd-AO	Presented in 70 mm Cinerama
Song of Norway	1970	Super Panavision 70	Presented in 70 mm Cinerama in UK and Canada only
The Great Waltz	1972	35 mm Panavision	Presented in 70 mm Cinerama in UK only
Run, Run, Joe!	1974	Todd-AO 35	Presented in 70 mm Cinerama in UK only
The Hateful Eight	2015	Ultra Panavision 70	Presented in 70 mm Cinerama

== "Cinerama" video stretching mode ==
RCA uses the word "Cinerama" to refer to a display mode which fills a 16∶9 video screen with 4∶3 video with, in the words of the manufacturer, "little distortion". Manuals for products offering this mode give no detailed explanation. Mitsubishi calls it "stretch" mode. The RCA Scenium TV also has a "stretch mode" as well as a 4∶3 picture stretched straight across.

There is no obvious connection between this video mode and any of the Cinerama motion picture processes. It is not clear why the name is used unless the nonlinear stretch alludes to a curved screen. (Ironically, some widescreen cinema processes – not Cinerama – displayed a fault known as "anamorphic mumps", which consisted of a lateral stretch of objects closer to the camera).

In the U.S., RCA does not appear to have registered the word Cinerama as a trademark; conversely, a number of trademarks on Cinerama, e.g. SN 74270575, are still "live" and held by Cinerama, Inc.

== See also ==
- Barco Escape
- Cinemiracle
- Cinéorama
- Cinerama Dome
- Cinerama Releasing Corporation
- Curved screen
- IMAX
- Kinopanorama
- List of 70 mm films
- List of film formats
- Pictureville Cinema
- ScreenX
- Seattle Cinerama
- Super Panavision 70
- Super Technirama 70
- Todd-AO
- Ultra Panavision 70
