= Ultra Panavision 70 =

65 mm motion picture widescreen process

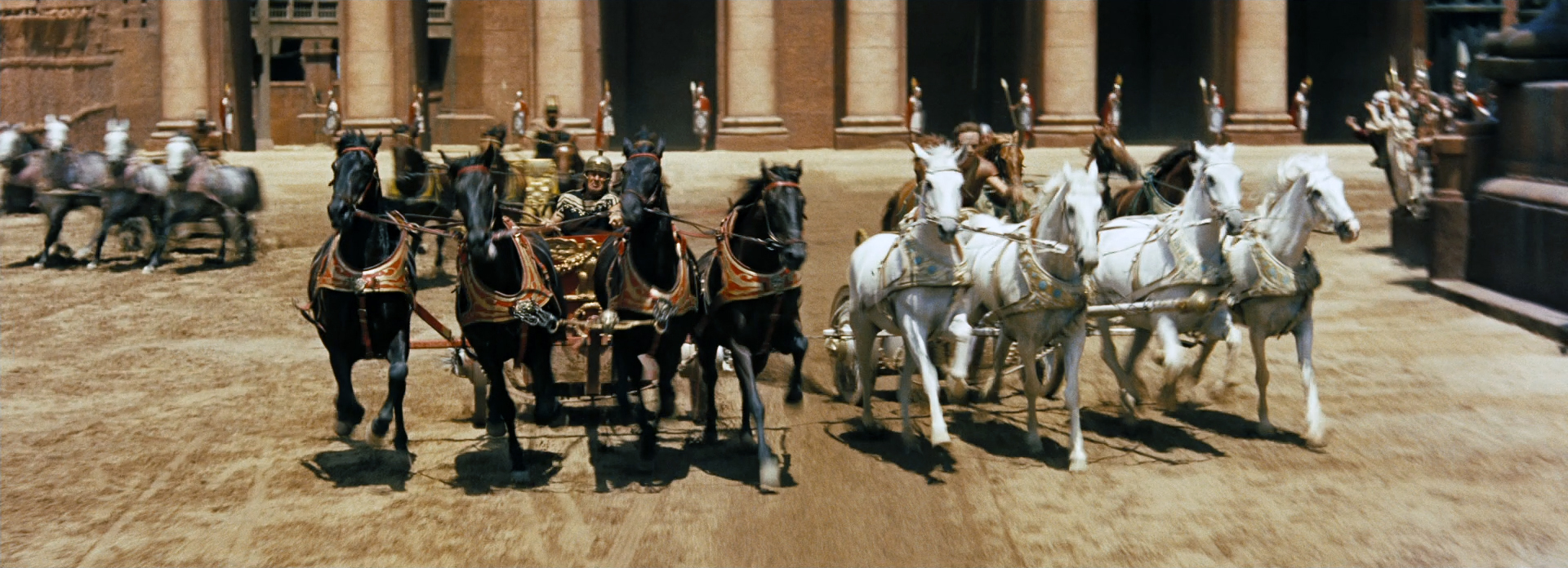
- The 1959 historical epic Ben-Hur, particularly its iconic chariot race sequence, is arguably the most notable use of Ultra Panavision 70.
- Type: Filmmaking technology
- Inventor: Robert Gottschalk; Takuo Miyagishima
- Inception: 1957
- Manufacturer: Panavision
- Models: Ultra-Panatar, APO-Panatar

Ultra Panavision 70 and MGM Camera 65 were, from 1957 to 1966, the marketing brands that identified motion pictures photographed with Panavision's anamorphic movie camera lenses on 65 mm film. Ultra Panavision 70 and MGM Camera 65 were shot at 24 frames per second (fps) using anamorphic camera lenses. Ultra Panavision 70 and MGM Camera 65's anamorphic lenses compressed the image 1.25 times, yielding an extremely wide aspect ratio of 2.76:1 (when a 70 mm projection print was used).

Ultra Panavision saw much less use than its sibling, the more popular Super Panavision 70, and was only used on ten films from 1957 to 1966. However, nearly fifty years later, Robert Richardson famously resurrected Ultra Panavision 70 after the lens test he came to do at the Panavision headquarters for the upcoming project with Quentin Tarantino, where he discovered that the lenses and equipment were still intact. Tarantino was fascinated by this and was able to refurbish the lenses for use in his next film, The Hateful Eight; which was shot entirely on 65 mm film using Ultra Panavision lenses, the first film to do so since Khartoum. Tarantino also released the film as a roadshow release, and this was the first time there were widely circulated 70 mm film prints to theaters with 70 mm projectors since 1992's Far and Away. This ultimately led to a resurgence in the use of Ultra Panavision lenses, which have now been used (albeit with digital cameras) to shoot blockbusters such as Rogue One and Avengers: Endgame.

== History ==
Metro-Goldwyn-Mayer (MGM) approached Panavision founder Robert Gottschalk in the late 1950s to create a large-format widescreen system capable of filling the extremely wide screens of Cinerama theaters while using a single projector, and would also be capable of producing high-quality standard 70 mm and 35 mm CinemaScope prints, which Cinerama's three-strip process did not allow for. Gottschalk developed a lens system using front-mounted prisms to impart a slight 1.25x squeeze onto a 5-perf 65 mm negative, resulting in a projected ratio of 2.76:1. These prism lenses were released under the name MGM Camera 65 in 1956.

In 1962, MGM's production of Mutiny on the Bounty, which was being produced in the format, ran far over-budget, and MGM was forced to sell off many of its assets to account for the losses. This allowed Panavision to purchase the Camera 65 equipment it had developed for MGM, and the system was renamed Ultra Panavision 70. As the prism lenses were bulky, oddly shaped and optically flawed, Panavision's optical engineer Takuo Miyagishima set to work on designing a more traditional set of 1.25x lenses using cylindrical glass, which became known as the Ultra Panatar series.

In 1963, the Cinerama Dome in Los Angeles became the first Cinerama theater built specifically for Ultra Panavision 70, and the theater opened with the premiere of It's a Mad, Mad, Mad, Mad World, which was filmed with the new Ultra Panatar lenses.

70 mm Ultra Panavision prints could be produced directly from the negative for use on flat screens, or "rectified" with increased compression towards the sides for use on curved Cinerama screens.

Panavision also developed a non-anamorphic 70 mm photographic system in 1959; this was named Super Panavision 70.

=== Differences from Todd-AO ===
The Ultra Panavision 70 and MGM Camera 65 lenses and cameras were similar to the 1955 version of the Todd-AO 65 mm photographic process, in that both were intended as replacements for three-strip Cinerama. The Todd-AO system was shot at 30 frames per second (fps), while Ultra Panavision 70 and MGM Camera 65 used the industry standard of 24 fps, and while the original Todd-AO process included the use of a deeply curved screen similar to that used for Cinerama (with fisheye optics to recreate its peripheral vision), its narrower, non-anamorphic 2.20:1 aspect ratio was incompatible with true Cinerama screens without cropping.

== Films ==
=== Films shot entirely in Ultra Panavision 70 ===
The following films were shot in either MGM Camera 65 or Ultra Panavision 70:

- Raintree County (1957) – credited as MGM Camera 65 (exhibited in CinemaScope as all theaters that could project in Camera 65 were showing Around the World in 80 Days).
- Ben-Hur (1959) – credited as MGM Camera 65.
- Mutiny on the Bounty (1962) – credited as Ultra Panavision.
- It's a Mad, Mad, Mad, Mad World (1963) – filmed in Ultra Panavision. Also projected using the single-projector Cinerama system.
- The Fall of the Roman Empire (1964) – credited as Ultra Panavision.
- The Greatest Story Ever Told (1965) – filmed in Ultra Panavision. Also originally projected using the single-projector Cinerama system.
- The Hallelujah Trail (1965) – filmed in Ultra Panavision. Also originally projected using the single-projector Cinerama system.
- Battle of the Bulge (1965) – filmed in Ultra Panavision. Also originally projected using the single-projector Cinerama system.
- Khartoum (1966) – filmed in Ultra Panavision. Also originally projected using the single-projector Cinerama system.
- The Hateful Eight (2015) – Directed by Quentin Tarantino, first film shot in this process since Khartoum. Filmed in Ultra Panavision 70 and projected with the single-projector Cinerama system in selected theaters.

Many sources often claim the 1959 film The Big Fisherman was filmed in Ultra Panavision, but Panavision itself says that the film was shot in Super Panavision 70.

=== Films with select scenes shot in Ultra Panavision 70 ===
- How the West Was Won (1962) – selected scenes only in Ultra Panavision.
- Christopher Robin (2018) – some scenes filmed in Ultra Panavision 70. Also filmed with Panavision 35 mm anamorphic lenses (on both 35 mm film and Arri Alexa digital cameras) and in Panavision System 65 with spherical lenses. The entire film is shown in the 2.40:1 aspect ratio.
- Sinners (2025) - Directed by Ryan Coogler, filmed in Ultra Panavision 70 with some sequences shot with 15/70 mm IMAX film cameras.
- Chapter 51 (2026) - Directed by Tyler Shields. Filmed in Ultra Panavision 70 along with various other film formats, including 8 mm film, 16 mm film, 35 mm film, VistaVision, and IMAX 70 mm film.

=== Films shot using Ultra Panavision lenses ===
Additionally, several films have been recorded digitally in conjunction with Ultra Panavision 70 lenses: Rogue One (2016), Bright (2017), Avengers: Infinity War (2018), Avengers: Endgame (2019), The King (2019), Wicked (2024) and Wicked: For Good (2025) with the Arri Alexa 65 camera, The Hate U Give (2018) and Like a Boss (2020) with the Panavision Millennium DXL2 camera, and A Haunting in Venice (2023) and Beetlejuice Beetlejuice (2024) with the Sony Venice 2.

Films such as The Creator (2023) and 28 Years Later (2025), though presented in the 2.76:1 aspect ratio, were not shot using the Ultra Panavision format.

== See also ==
- Super Panavision 70
- Super Technirama 70

== Bibliography ==
- Altman, Rick. Sound Theory, Sound Practice. Florence, Ky.: Psychology Press, 1992.
- Balio, Tino. United Artists: The Company That Changed the Film Industry. Madison, Wisc.: University of Wisconsin Press, 1987.
- Belton, John. Widescreen Cinema. Cambridge, Mass.: Harvard University Press, 1992.
- Block, Alex Ben and Wilson, Lucy Autrey. George Lucas's Blockbusting: A Decade-by-Decade Survey of Timeless Movies, Including Untold Secrets of Their Financial and Cultural Success. New York: HarperCollins, 2010.
- Burum, Stephen H. American Cinematographer Manual. Hollywood, Calif.: ASC Press, 2007.
- Cameron, James Ross. Cameron's Encyclopedia on Sound Motion Pictures. Manhattan Beach, N.Y.: Cameron Pub. Co., 1930.
- Casper, Drew. Postwar Hollywood, 1946-1962. Malden, Mass.: Blackwell, 2007.
- Carr, Robert E. and Hayes, R.M. Wide Screen Movies. Jefferson, NC: McFarland, 1988.
- Clark, Al. The Film Year Book 1984. New York : Grove Press, 1983.
- Eldridge, David. Hollywood's History Films. London: Tauris, 2006.
- Enticknap, Leo. Moving Image Technology: From Zoetrope to Digital. London: Wallflower, 2005.
- Eyman, Scott. The Speed of Sound: Hollywood and the Talkie Revolution, 1926-1930. New York: Simon and Schuster, 1997.
- Haines, Richard W. Technicolor Movies: The History of Dye Transfer Printing. Jefferson, N.C.: McFarland, 1993.
- Hall, Sheldon and Neale, Stephen. Epics, Spectacles, and Blockbusters: A Hollywood History. Detroit: Wayne State University Press, 2010.
- Hughes, Howard. When Eagles Dared: The Filmgoers' History of World War II. London: I.B. Tauris, 2011.
- Hutchison, David. Film Magic: The Art and Science of Special Effects. New York: Prentice-Hall, 1987.
- IMAGO. Making Pictures: A Century of European Cinematography. New York: Abrams, 2003.
- Kastrenakes (11 July 2015). "Quentin Tarantino defends the decision to shoot — and screen — The Hateful Eight on 70mm film". The Verge.
- Lev, Peter. Transforming the Screen: 1950-1959. Berkeley, Calif.: University of California Press, 2003.
- Lightman, Herb A. "Why MGM Chose Camera 65." American Cinematographer. March 1960.
- McGhee, Richard D. John Wayne: Actor, Artist, Hero. Jefferson, N.C.: McFarland & Co., 1990.
- Reid, John Howard. 20th Century-Fox: CinemaScope. Morrisville, N.C.: Lulu Press, 2009.
- Samuelson, David W. Panaflex Users' Manual. Boston: Focal Press, 1996.
- Sklar, Robert. Film: An International History of the Medium. New York: Prentice Hall 1993.
- Tibbetts, John C. American Classic Screen Features. Lanham, Md.: Scarecrow Press, 2010.
- Ward, Peter. Picture Composition for Film and Television. Oxford, UK: Focal, 2003.
