= Benjamin Abbott Dickson =

United States Army colonel

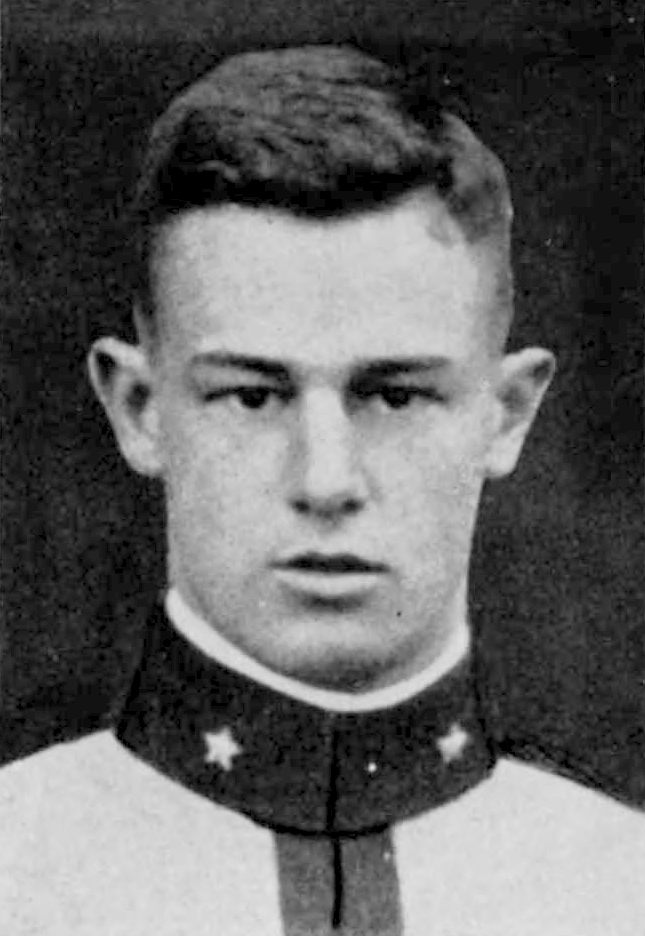
- At West Point in 1918
- Born: December 18, 1897; Springfield, Massachusetts, United States
- Died: February 14, 1976 (aged 78); Devon, Pennsylvania, United States
- Burial place: West Point Cemetery
- Other name: Monk Dickson
- Spouse: Eleanor Shaler
- Military career
- Allegiance: United States
- Branch: U.S. Army
- Rank: Colonel
- Unit: First United States Army

Benjamin Abbott Dickson (1897–1976), better known as Monk Dickson, was a United States Army colonel who served in World War II as an intelligence officer. He is best known for predicting the Battle of the Bulge in 1944.

== Early life ==
Dickson was born in Springfield, Massachusetts to Tracy Campbell Dickson and Isabella Kendrick Dickson (née Abbott) on December 18, 1897. His father Tracy was a brigadier general in the United States Army, an 1892 graduate of the United States Military Academy and the Assistant Chief of Ordnance in the United States Department of War. Dickson had one older brother, Tracy Campbell Dixon Jr., who became an officer after attending West Point. Benjamin Dickson followed family tradition by enrolling in West Point in 1916. While attending the USMA, Dickson played for the football team and earned his lifelong nickname of "Monk" as he disliked mandatory chapel.

Dickson graduated from West Point in 1918 and was assigned to the Mexico–United States border. He was then sent to Russia as part of the American Expeditionary Force, Siberia to rescue stranded Czech soldiers. In 1920, Dickson gave up his first lieutenant's commission to attend the Massachusetts Institute of Technology, where he earned a degree in mechanical engineering.

== Military career ==
He returned to active duty in October 1940, working in intelligence. Dickson primarily worked under Omar Bradley, commander of the First United States Army, as Bradley's chief of intelligence in North Africa. When Vichy collaborator François Darlan was captured in Algiers in November 1942, Dickson ordered him arrested. While serving in North Africa, Dickson was wounded in the ankle during a reconnaissance mission. Due to his many warnings about Erwin Rommel's encroaching tanks, he soon developed a reputation among his superiors for being an "alarmist" and a "raconteur". However, as chief of intelligence, Dickson was one of the few officers who had direct access to Ultra intelligence reports from Bletchley Park.

When Bradley was promoted to commander of Twelfth Army Group in August 1944, Dickson became the chief intelligence officer of his replacement, Courtney Hodges. His reputation was damaged in September 1944 when he incorrectly reported that the SS was dissolving. In November 1944, both Dickson and British Army officer Kenneth Strong predicted an imminent German attack. On December 10, 1944, Dickson submitted "G-2 Intelligence Estimate No. 37", a report which warned that the German military was likely preparing to launch a counteroffensive towards the west. Dickson's report was largely ignored by his superiors due to their desire to not mar the approaching Christmas season. On December 14, Dickson reiterated his warning, stating that he believed the Germans would launch their attack in the Ardennes. He also requested that the Allies bomb nearby rail lines used by the Germans, but the Air Force Combat Command's Carl Spaatz denied his request. Prior to the counteroffensive, on-the-ground intelligence from Office of Strategic Services operatives behind the German lines was largely unavailable; Dickson had previously reassigned the First Army's OSS contingent. After delivering his reports, Dickson went on leave in Paris to celebrate his birthday. While he was in Paris, the Germans launched their attack on December 16 and the Battle of the Bulge commenced. Dickson quickly returned to the front where he continued gathering intelligence to assist the Allied troops.

After the counteroffensive was successfully repelled, Dickson moved east with the First Army as they invaded Germany. When First Army linked up with Soviet Red Army units at war's end, Dickson was among the First Army staff officers who were decorated with a Soviet award. Dickson received the Order of the Patriotic War First Class. He left the Army on November 19, 1945.

== Personal life ==
Dickson was married twice. He had one daughter with his first wife. His second wife was actress and singer Eleanor Shaler (married 1937). The couple had two children, William and Colin.

He died at his home in Devon, Pennsylvania on February 14, 1976, and was buried at West Point Cemetery.

== In popular culture ==
Henry Fonda portrayed a fictionalized version of Dickson in the 1965 film Battle of the Bulge.

== Awards ==
- Distinguished Service Medal
- Purple Heart
- Bronze Star
- Legion of Honor
- Croix de Guerre
- Order of the Patriotic War First Class (USSR)
