= Battle of the Bulge (1965 film) =

1965 film by Ken Annakin

- Theatrical release poster
- Directed by: Ken Annakin
- Written by: Philip Yordan; Milton Sperling; John Melson
- Produced by: Milton Sperling; Philip Yordan
- Starring: Henry Fonda; Robert Shaw; Robert Ryan; Dana Andrews; Pier Angeli; Barbara Werle; George Montgomery; Ty Hardin; Charles Bronson; Hans Christian Blech; Werner Peters; James MacArthur; Telly Savalas
- Narrated by: William Conrad
- Cinematography: Jack Hildyard
- Edited by: Derek Parsons
- Music by: Benjamin Frankel
- Color process: Technicolor
- Production companies: Cinerama Productions; United States Pictures
- Distributed by: Warner Bros. Pictures
- Release date: December 16, 1965
- Running time: 170 minutes
- Country: United States
- Language: English
- Budget: $6.5 million
- Box office: $4.5 million (est. US/ Canada rentals)

Battle of the Bulge is a 1965 American epic war film produced in Spain, directed by Ken Annakin and starring Henry Fonda, Robert Shaw, Telly Savalas, Robert Ryan, Dana Andrews and Charles Bronson. The feature was filmed in Ultra Panavision 70 and exhibited in 70 mm Cinerama. Battle of the Bulge had its world premiere on December 16, 1965, the 21st anniversary of the titular battle, at the Pacific Cinerama Dome Theatre in Hollywood, California.

The film is a highly fictionalized account of the battle. The filmmakers attempted to condense the Battle of the Bulge, a World War II battle that stretched across parts of Germany, Belgium and Luxembourg and lasted nearly a month, into under three hours, and shot parts of the film on terrain, and in weather, that did not remotely resemble the actual battle conditions. That left them open to criticism for lack of historical accuracy. Still, they claimed in the end credits that they had "re-organized" the chronological order of events to maximize the dramatic story.

Unlike most other World War II epics, Battle of the Bulge contains virtually no portrayals of actual senior Allied leaders, civilian or military. That is presumably because of controversies surrounding the battle, both during the war and afterward. Allied forces ultimately won the battle, but the initial German counteroffensive caught them by surprise and caused many casualties.

== Plot ==
In December 1944, military intelligence officer and Army Lieutenant Colonel Daniel Kiley is on a reconnaissance flight over the Ardennes forest when he locates a German staff car and photographs its occupants. Spooked by the low-flying plane, the German driver abandons the car. His passenger, Colonel Hessler (a Heer Officer), scolds him and they continue on to a briefing at an underground base. General Kohler explains a plan to recapture Antwerp and tells Hessler he will lead the attack with a brigade of new King Tiger tanks.

English-speaking German paratroopers led by SS Lieutenant Schumacher (based on Colonel Otto Skorzeny) prepare to be dropped behind American lines disguised as American MPs. Hessler's orderly and driver, Conrad, reminds Hessler that his King Tigers will be commanded by inexperienced replacements. Hessler reviews the commanders of his new brigade, dismissing them as mere "boys" until they break into a chorus of the Panzerlied.

Kiley presents his intelligence findings to Major General Grey and his executive officer, Col. Pritchard, but they don't believe Kiley's conclusion that the Germans are planning an offensive. Kiley travels to an outpost on the Siegfried Line to capture prisoners for interrogation to find out more. Major Wolenski sends callow Lieutenant Weaver and gung-ho Sergeant Duquesne on patrol. Col. Pritchard feels vindicated when the patrol returns with inexperienced German replacements with unfired weapons, but Kiley concludes the Germans are keeping their best men back for an offensive. His warnings are again dismissed.

Hessler's tanks start the offensive a day later, overrunning Wolenski's unit in the Schnee Eifel. Allied tanks led by Sergeant Guffy find the King Tigers vastly superior and are forced to retreat to Amblève. Guffy's crew retrieves their black market goods from a farmhouse while Guffy professes his love for his Belgian partner in crime, Louise. Lieutenant Schumacher's disguised troops secure the Our River bridge for the passage of Hessler's heavy tanks and switch signs at a vital intersection of roads connecting Amblève, Malmedy, and the Siegfried Line. Wolenski's troops follow the changed signs and arrive at Malmedy by mistake, where they are captured and massacred by SS troops, though Weaver successfully escapes, with Duquesne saving his life at the expense of his own. US engineers, suspicious of Schumacher's fake MPs pretending to demolish the Our bridge, are killed in a confrontation with Schumacher's men.

Hessler's tanks cross the Our and approach Amblève where the Americans have improvised a strong defense. Kohler orders Hessler to bypass the town, but Hessler convinces him it is important to break the Americans' will to fight by bombarding Amblève, then occupying its ruins. Wolenski is captured when the town falls, but senior staff escape to the Meuse River to regroup. Guffy learns that Louise died in the shelling.

Kiley flies a dangerous aerial reconnaissance mission in dark and fog. He manages to locate and radio the position of Hessler's tanks before the plane is shot down, killing the pilot and wounding Kiley, who is evacuated to an American fuel depot.

When Hessler revels in the thought the war might go on forever, an exasperated Conrad curses him and demands a transfer. Hessler transfers him to the German fuel supply column.

General Grey's division prepares to defend the fuel depot when Kiley reports the Germans are desperate for gasoline. The American tanks lure the Germans into using the last of their fuel in an open-field confrontation, suffering great losses but leaving the Germans nearly out of gas. A group of stragglers led by Weaver and Guffy kill Schumacher and his fake MPs attempting to secure the fuel depot. Kiley urges the men to burn the depot, while Hessler orders his tanks to capture the depot at all costs. The Americans flood the road with gasoline and ignite it with grenades, immolating the German tanks and crews. Hessler refuses to quit, takes the controls of his tank, and burns to death when a fuel drum hits it. The surviving Germans abandon their vehicles and begin a long walk back to Germany. Conrad throws aside his weapon, done with the war, and joins them.

== Cast ==
- Henry Fonda as Lt. Col. Daniel Kiley
- Robert Shaw as Col. Martin Hessler
- Robert Ryan as Maj. Gen. Grey
- Dana Andrews as Col. Pritchard
- George Montgomery as Sgt. Duquesne
- Ty Hardin as Lt. Schumacher
- Pier Angeli as Louise
- Barbara Werle as Elena
- Charles Bronson as Maj. Wolenski
- Hans Christian Blech as Conrad
- Werner Peters as Gen. Kohler
- James MacArthur as Lt. Weaver
- Karl-Otto Alberty as Maj. Von Diepel
- Telly Savalas as Sgt. Guffy
- Steve Rowland as Courtland
- Robert Woods as Joe

== Historical inaccuracies ==
The film's opening narration by William Conrad inaccurately states, "To the north stood Montgomery's Eighth Army...." The British Eighth Army, Bernard Montgomery's previous command, was in Italy at the time; Montgomery's northern command was the 21st Army Group. The narration continued, "...To the south, Patton's Third Army." Although George S. Patton's Third Army was indeed to the south, it was not tasked in any way with defending the Ardennes. Instead, it was dug in on the west bank of the Rhine River, a component of a much larger force of four American armies of the 12th Army Group under General Omar Bradley poised to cross it into Germany.

After the introduction, there is no reference to British forces in the area, though they were largely kept behind the Meuse River and thus almost entirely out of the fighting. Consequently, there is no mention of General Dwight D. Eisenhower's decision to split the Bulge front into two, transferring temporary command of two American armies to Field Marshal Montgomery in the northern half of the Bulge. As a result, the film implies an all-American operation.

The film was shot on location in the Sierra de Guadarrama mountain range and Madrid, Spain, which bear no resemblance to the rugged, heavily wooded Ardennes of Belgium, Luxembourg, and western Germany. Aside from the initial American encounters with the German offensive, the weather during filming was also at odds with the actual battle, which was fought during waves of heavy snow. The film's major tank battle scene, and some other battle scenes, were fought in flat, bare, arid territory.

The aviation reconnaissance scenes with Henry Fonda were filmed with one or more Cessna L-19 aircraft, which did not fly until December 1949, instead of the Piper L-4 that was widely used during World War II.

The final tank battle is a rough depiction of the Battle of Celles on December 26, 1944, where the U.S. 2nd Armored Div. smashed the German 2nd Panzer Division. The film creates the false impression that large numbers of American tanks sacrificed themselves against heavy Tiger IIs and, in the process, lured the enemy off course, which caused them to run out of gasoline/petrol. In reality, they were already stranded. Despite the producer's claims in an interview in one of the DVD extras, the tanks that were used are not historically accurate. Although the M24 Chaffee light tanks used in the movie instead of the ubiquitous M4 Sherman were introduced during World War II, they were not used on the scale shown in the film but were relatively rare.

U.S. M47 Pattons were used to represent German King Tiger tanks (of which none existed to use), despite being over 20 tons lighter.

Absent from the movie is the response of the U.S. Third Army under General George Patton in relief of the bypassed but encircled city of Bastogne.

There is also no mention of the key turning point in the battle, which was not an armor and infantry effort but rather Allied air power hitting the German spearhead hard at the first sign of clear weather, only the German HQ receiving word that the weather was set to clear.

The characters of Daniel Kiley (Fonda), an American lieutenant colonel, and Martin Hessler (Robert Shaw), a regular Wehrmacht tank commander, were loosely based on Colonel Benjamin Abbott "Monk" Dickson and Waffen-SS lieutenant colonel Joachim Peiper. However, the character of Hessler asks General Kohler (Werner Peters) about the reports of the massacre at Malmedy, which Kohler blames on another SS officer, making the comparison of Hessler and Peiper inaccurate. However, the fictional characters bore marked differences. For example, Peiper did not die in a kamikaze tank attack. He was tried and sentenced to death at the War Crimes Tribunal for his role in the Malmedy massacre, but was released after serving 12 years in prison. He lived until 1976, when he was killed in France by French vigilantes.

== Production ==
Screenwriter Bernard Gordon claims to have rewritten John Melson's original screenplay. Some of the original choices for director were the experienced and successful Richard Fleischer, who turned it down, and Edward Dmytryk, with whom Jack L. Warner of Warner Bros. Pictures refused to work. Ultimately, the job went to Ken Annakin who had made The Longest Day. Annakin wrote, "It seemed quite a good narrative account of the German surprise onslaught against the American forces in the Ardennes and how the allied advance was nearly turned at this point, but the dialogue was not remarkable, the character relationships nothing special — it seemed to me just another war picture." However, he decided to take the job on the advice of his colleagues who said it would be a big hit.

A technical adviser on the film was Maj. Gen. Meinrad von Lauchert, who as a colonel commanded the German tank division that made the most headway in the actual battle.

For an economical price and with no restrictions, the Spanish army provided an estimated 500 fully-equipped soldiers and 75 tanks and vehicles, some of which were World War II vintage.

A contentious matter in 1964-65 was another "Bulge" film—never completed—slated by Columbia Pictures, to have been called The 16th of December: The Battle of the Bulge and co-produced by Tony Lazzarino. The Columbia effort had the cooperation of the Pentagon, which offered to Lazzarino "an unpublished battle history running to thousands of pages," and Eisenhower's assistance as well. The film would have been shot largely in upper New York State at the Army's Fort Drum, which would have offered authentic winter weather conditions. The proposed Columbia film had the cooperation of many officers who were part of the battle, including Germany's General Hasso von Manteuffel, commander of the Fifth Panzer Army, and U.S. General Robert W. Hasbrouck, who had led the Seventh Armored Division).

As late as December 1965—the month the Warner film was released—there were still plans to make the Columbia film. Casting announcements included Van Heflin as Eisenhower, John Wayne as General Patton, David Niven as General Montgomery, and Laurence Olivier as Adolf Hitler. Columbia issued a 1964 injunction against Warner for registering its Battle of the Bulge title with the MPAA; to get Columbia to drop it, Warners agreed not to mention actual names such as Eisenhower, Montgomery, Bradley, Patton, Anthony MacAuliffe (the U.S. general who issued the dumbfounding "Nuts!" response to the German request for surrender) and 10 others "whose stories have been contributed to the Morgan-Lazzarino version". Early in 1964, the press had announced a $1 million award to Columbia from the Warner production, also forbidden from "seeking support from agencies and individuals with whom Columbia Pictures and Gotham Rhodes had already made agreements".

== Release ==
=== Home media ===
The original VHS release of the film for home video use was heavily edited to fit on one VHS tape and used a full-screen "pan and scan" technique, which was often used in network telecasts of widescreen motion pictures. The 1992 Laserdisc and 2005 DVD releases feature the full-length film and are presented letterboxed in the original 2.76:1 aspect ratio. A Blu-ray release followed in 2007, also in the original 2.76:1 aspect ratio.

== Reception ==
=== Box office ===
The film was one of the most popular films at the British box office in 1966.

=== Critical response ===
The film received mixed reviews from critics. Reviewers were impressed by the big-name cast, but they were unafraid to point out historical inaccuracies, as Bosley Crowther raged in his assessment of the film for The New York Times:

What is offensive about this picture—and offensive is the word—is the evident distortion of the material and of history to suit the wide Cinerama screen....for instance, it is the removal of the heavy fog that actually made it possible for the Germans to carry on their tank attacks without fear of retaliation from the air....This is a complete distortion of the weather conditions that made the battle what it was....it is a cruel deception to describe the climax of the Battle of the Bulge as a raging of German tanks against Americans across a broad plain in the manner of a Western movie cavalry-and-Indian charge....[the film] will be a likely irritation to those who have some sober, rueful sense of World War II, and also a respectful regard for the memory of the men who fought and died in the real "Bulge".

On review aggregator website Rotten Tomatoes, the film has a 63% approval rating based on 8 reviews, with an average score of 7.1/10.

=== Legacy ===
The film later influenced the original Star Wars trilogy during the production of The Empire Strikes Back (1980), with the Battle of Hoth being influenced by the actual war and its film as well.

== Other media ==
- There was a Dell Movie Classic comic book tie-in in June 1966 titled Battle of the Bulge.
- There was a paperback novelisation by-lined Michael Tabor titled Battle of the Bulge (POPULAR; PC1062 edition; January 1, 1965) The actual author was probably Lou Cameron: the prose style and presentation evidence several distinct Cameron “tells,” he was then noted as a popular author of paperback original war novels (including the novelization of None but the Brave), he would years later create the popular Longarm western series for which he devised the house pseudonym Tabor Evans…and an army veteran, he himself had fought and been injured in the actual Battle of the Bulge.

== See also ==
- List of American films of 1965

== Bibliography ==
- Annakin, Ken (2001). So you wanna be a director?. Tomahawk Press. ISBN 978-0-9531926-5-6.
