= J. D. H. Stewart =

British soldier

John Donald Hamill Stewart
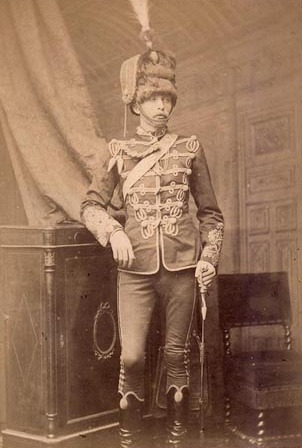
- Colonel Stewart
- Born: 15 October 1845; Dublin, Ireland, UK
- Died: 26 September 1884 (aged 38); El Obeid, Khedivate of Egypt
- Military career
- Allegiance: United Kingdom / British Empire; Khedivate of Egypt
- Branch: British Army; Egyptian Army
- Service years: 1865–1884
- Rank: Colonel
- Conflicts: Mahdist War: Siege of Khartoum
- Awards: Companion of the Order of St Michael and St George

Colonel John Donald Hamill Stewart, CMG (15 October 1845 – 26 September 1884) was a British soldier. He accompanied General Gordon to Khartoum in 1884 as his assistant. He died in September 1884 attempting to run the blockade from the besieged city at the hands of the Manasir tribesmen and followers of Muhammad Ahmad Al-Mahdi.

== Military career ==
Stewart purchased a Cornet’s commission in the British 11th Hussars in 1865.

In 1882 Lieutenant Colonel Stewart was instructed to prepare a report on the Sudan where Muhammad Ahmad Al-Mahdi was defying the Egyptian Government with success. After a journey to Khartoum and return to Egypt the "Report on the Soudan" (1883) was finished.

He returned with Gordon as second-in-command on his journey to Khartoum commencing with departure from Victoria station in February 1884. Wounded during the siege, Stewart led an attempt to break the blockade aboard the Steamer Abbas in September 1884, along with the British consul Frank Power (who was also the correspondent from The Times), the French consul Léon Herbin, and other residents of Khartoum. The attempt failed when the Abbas ran aground on a rock near Abu Hamad. All passengers and crew were killed by Arab tribes ashore. Gordon learned of this a few weeks later when he received a letter from the Mahdi that quoted from letters that Stewart had been carrying with him on the Abbas.

== Legacy ==
Richard Johnson portrayed Stewart in the film Khartoum.

== Bibliography ==
- Hill, Richard. (1967). A Biographical Dictionary of the Sudan. London: Frank Cass & Co
