= Solomon and Sheba =

1959 film directed by King Vidor

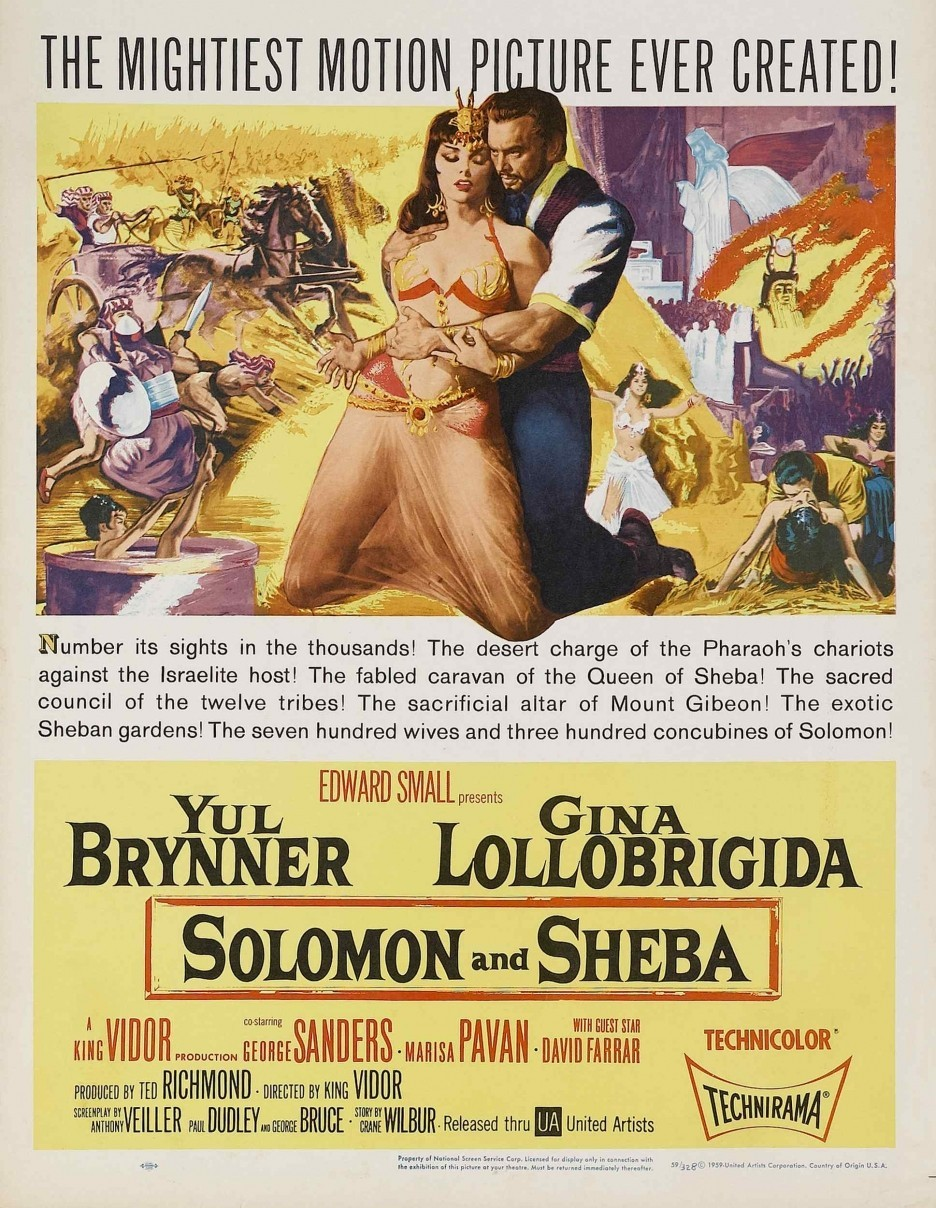
- Film poster
- Directed by: King Vidor
- Screenplay by: Anthony Veiller; Paul Dudley; George Bruce
- Story by: Crane Wilbur
- Based on: Books of Kings; Books of Chronicles
- Produced by: Ted Richmond
- Starring: Yul Brynner; Gina Lollobrigida
- Cinematography: Fred A. Young
- Edited by: Otto Ludwig
- Music by: Mario Nascimbene
- Production company: Edward Small Productions
- Distributed by: United Artists
- Release dates: October 27, 1959 (London premiere); December 25, 1959 (New York City premiere)
- Running time: 141 minutes
- Country: United States
- Language: English
- Budget: $5 million
- Box office: $12,200,000

Solomon and Sheba is a 1959 American Biblical epic historical drama film directed by King Vidor, shot in Technirama (color by Technicolor), and distributed by United Artists. The film dramatizes events described in the tenth chapter of First Kings and the ninth chapter of Second Chronicles. It centers on the relationship between King Solomon and the Queen of Sheba, played by Yul Brynner and Gina Lollobrigida, respectively. The cast also features George Sanders, Marisa Pavan, David Farrar and Harry Andrews.

The film differs substantially from Biblical sources and is highly fictionalized, most notably in representing the Queen of Sheba as an ally of ancient Egypt in opposition to King Solomon of Israel, and in her having a love affair with Solomon.

Tyrone Power was originally cast as Solomon and filmed the role for two months, before dying of a heart attack while performing a duel with his frequent costar and friend George Sanders. The role was hastily recast with Yul Brynner, who had previously turned it down, and large swaths of footage were re-shot to accommodate the change, though some footage of Power in the large-scale battle scenes remains in the final film.

The film premiered in London on October 27, 1959 before being released in the United States on Christmas Day of that year. It received a lukewarm critical reception and proved King Vidor’s final feature film before his death in 1982. In February 2020, the film was shown at the 70th Berlin International Film Festival, as part of a retrospective dedicated to Vidor's career.

== Plot ==
Under the rule of King David, Israel is united and prosperous, although surrounded by enemies, including Egypt and its allies, such as Sheba. The aging King favours the peace-loving Solomon to succeed him, but his elder brother Adonijah, a warrior, declares himself King, after a battle with Egypt where he encounters and insults the Queen of Sheba, as she and her troops retreat. When David learns of this, he publicly announces Solomon to be his successor. Adonijah and Joab, his general, withdraw in rage, but Solomon later offers his brother the command of the army, though knowing that Adonijah may use it against him.

Israel continues to prosper under Solomon's rule. The Queen of Sheba conspires with the Egyptian Pharaoh to undermine Solomon's rule by seducing him and introducing Sheban pagan worship into Jerusalem. Solomon is indeed bewitched by her, and the two begin living together under the pretense of forming an alliance between their two kingdoms. The king's reputation is damaged, but at the same time Sheba—who sees the king's wisdom in the Judgment of Solomon—begins to truly fall in love with him and regret her plotting; she even helps save his life when Adonijah sends Joab to assassinate Solomon.

Things come to a head when Solomon recklessly allows a Sheban "love festival" (in fact a virtual orgy in celebration of a pagan god Rah-gon) to be held within Israel, and even visits the festival, embracing the Queen. In an act of divine retribution, lightning from heaven destroys the Sheban altar and damages the newly built Temple in Jerusalem, and also kills David's handmaiden, the virtuous Abishag, who loved Solomon and went to the Temple to ask God to punish her instead of Solomon; and the land is beset with a deadly famine. Solomon is publicly rebuked by the people; Zadok the High Priest and Nathan the Prophet disown him.

Meanwhile, Adonijah, banished by his brother after the assassination attempt, goes and strikes a bargain with Pharaoh; given an army, he will conquer Israel for Egypt, in exchange for being placed on the throne as a kind of viceroy. The tiny army mustered by Solomon (who has been abandoned by his allied states) is quickly routed, and Adonijah presses on to Jerusalem and makes himself king. Meanwhile, Sheba, now a believer in the power of the God of Israel, prays for Solomon to be redeemed and restored to power as Nathan overhears.

Pursued by the Egyptians, who were sent to finish him off, Solomon thereafter devises a plan. He lines up the remnants of his army on a hill, prompting the enemy to charge. The Israelites, who have arranged themselves to face east, then use their highly polished shields to reflect the light of the rising sun into the Egyptians' eyes. Blinded, the Egyptians are prevented from seeing the chasm in front of which the Israelites have positioned themselves, and the entire army rushes headlong over the edge and falls to its death.

Meanwhile, Adonijah, met with a tepid reaction to his coup, tries to stir up Jerusalem's population by ordering the stoning of Sheba, despite Nathan's protests. Midway through this hideous display, Solomon makes a triumphant return to the city. Adonijah attacks his brother, refusing to be deprived again of his throne, but is himself struck down by Solomon. Joab, in retaliation, attempts to attack Solomon, but is struck down by Solomon's faithful retainers Josiah and Ahab. At Solomon's prayer Sheba is miraculously healed of her wounds; as he resumes his power, she returns to her homeland, now pregnant by Solomon, though unable to stay, since God ordained that her and Solomon's atonement was that they would be separated. Their child will, though, if male, be the first King of Sheba.

== Cast ==
- Yul Brynner as King Solomon
- Gina Lollobrigida as Queen of Sheba
- George Sanders as Adonijah
- Marisa Pavan as Abishag
- David Farrar as Pharaoh Siamun
- Harry Andrews as Baltor
- John Crawford as Joab
- Laurence Naismith as Hezrai
- Finlay Currie as King David
- Jean Anderson as Takyan
- William Devlin as Nathan
- Jack Gwillim as Josiah
- José Nieto as Ahab
- Maruchi Fresno as Bathsheba
- Julio Peña as Zadok
- Alejandro Rey as Sittar
- Félix de Pomés as Egyptian General

== Production ==
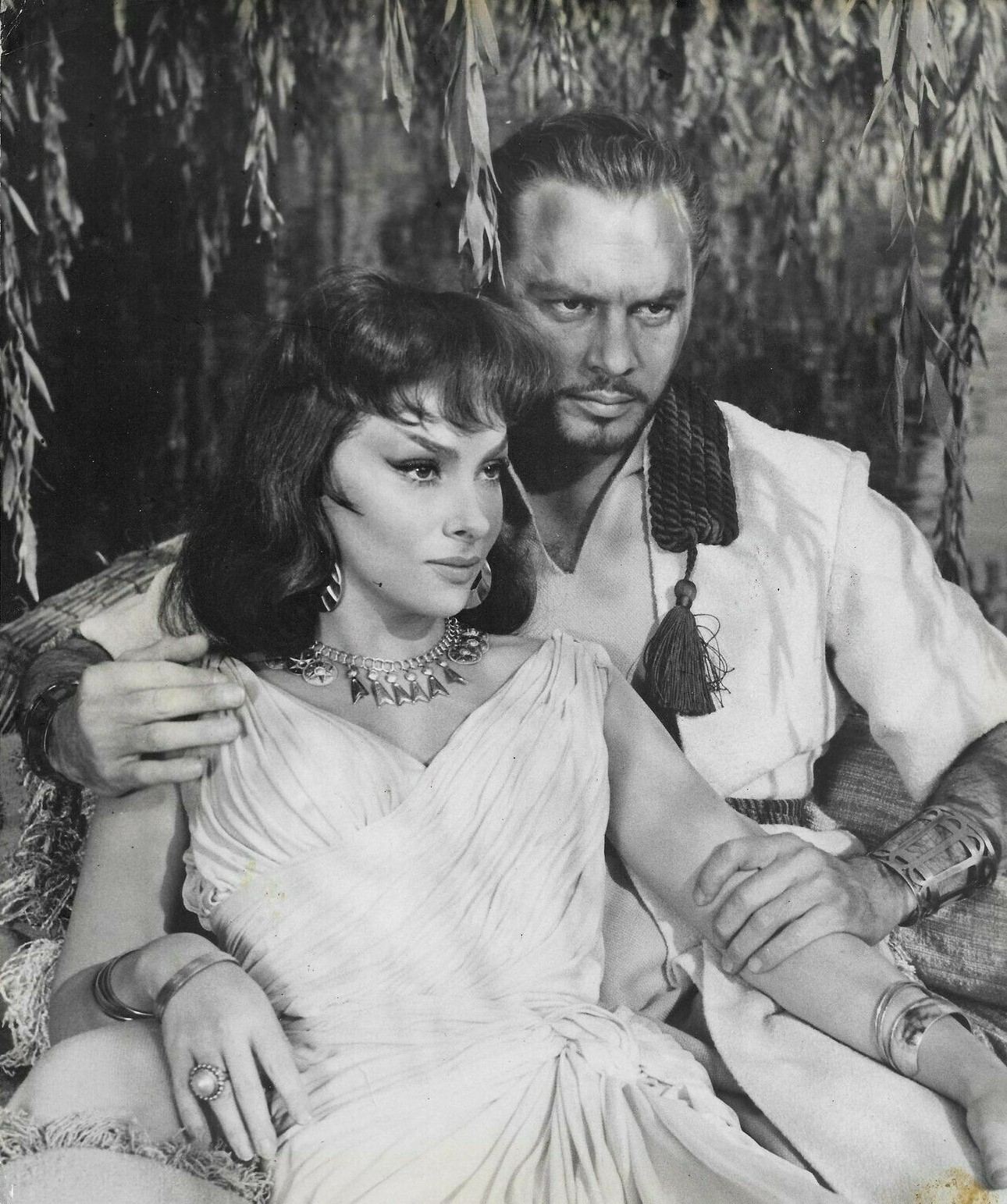
Gina Lollobrigida and Yul Brynner

Edward Small announced plans to make a film about King Solomon as early as 1953. The following year Julius Epstein was writing a script for Small which was going to be produced by the team of Clarence Greene and Russell Rouse (who often made movies under Small's supervision). Small then announced he was developing the project with Arthur Hornblow Jr. and in 1955 Gina Lollobrigida was signed. United Artists agreed to distribute the following year. Small provided 75% of the film's anticipated $6 million budget and United Artists provided 25%.

Lollobrigida came on board as financial partner, getting a percentage of the profits. The role of Solomon was initially turned down by Tyrone Power and Yul Brynner; however, Power agreed to accept the part after the script was rewritten.

Power's involvement meant the film became a co-production with Power's Copa Productions, headed by Ted Richmond. In the interim, Small and Hornblow had made Witness for the Prosecution together which was a hit but they decided to end their partnership. Small went into co-production with Copa Productions, with Hornblow retaining a financial interest.

The film was shot in Madrid and Zaragoza, Spain. Production began on 15 September 1958, aiming for a mid-December finish. The orgy scene cost approximately $100,000, and was choreographed by Jaroslav Berger, the ballet chief of the Berne State Theatre in Switzerland. Gina Lollobrigida rehearsed her dance for over a month.

The film score was composed by Mario Nascimbene and conducted by Franco Ferrara. Three additional cues, “Gifts”, “Candle Scene” and “The Sacrifice” were written by an uncredited Malcolm Arnold.

=== Death and replacement of Tyrone Power ===
Two thirds of the movie had been shot and the unit was in Madrid when on 15 November, Tyrone Power filmed a duel scene with George Sanders, who played his brother. (The two had previously filmed a sword fight in the 1942 film The Black Swan.) The duel had to be repeated several times. Power finally dropped the sword and said he could not continue, complaining of a pain in his left arm. He was helped to his dressing room and given brandy. It is unclear what happened next as stories differ. In one scenario, he was taken to the hospital in Gina Lollobrigida's car and died. Another scenario is that Power died in his dressing room. In order to keep his jaw from dropping, a scarf was put around his neck to "walk" him out of the studio to the car. This was done in part because Mrs. Power was at the hotel and knew nothing about what happened. Ted Richmond gave orders that no press was to be called and Mrs. Power was not to be called. She was later escorted to the hospital. A memorial service was held in Spain on 16 November at the U.S. Air Force base in Torrejon (Power was a Marine Corps pilot during the Second World War).

Production of the movie was halted. Because love scenes remained to be shot, another actor would have to be cast if the existing script was to be used; battle sequences had been filmed, but most of these could still be used, with close ups of the new actor added. Other possibilities discussed including rewriting the script to use Power's footage, or use Power for the first half of the movie (as "young Solomon"), then recasting another actor as Solomon for the second half. The issue was complicated because three different parties had full script, star, and director approval: Small, Copa Productions, and Gina Lollobrigida.

On 16 November Small offered the part of Solomon to Yul Brynner, a friend of Power, and the actor accepted. This meant Brynner had to delay playing the lead role in an adaption of the Howard Fast's 1951 novel Spartacus that was subsequently cancelled and instead produced by Kirk Douglas as the 1960 movie Spartacus to which he had committed. However United Artists had not been told of Brynner's casting and were unsure of the conditions which had been granted to him. Ted Richmond wanted to pull out of producing and for a time there was some doubt if the film would go ahead at all.

Another option was to cancel Solomon and Sheba altogether: the production was insured up to $3 million in the case of the death of one of the six lead players; Lloyd's of London covered the daily $100,000 bill while the film was halted. However, in the end it was decided to proceed with Brynner in the role of Solomon.

The film was eventually completed over ten weeks after much difficulty with an estimated cost of $6 million. It was felt that this was relatively inexpensive considering the scale of the movie. As a result, Spain increasingly became a base for Hollywood movies.

== Release ==
Trailer for Solomon and Sheba

Solomon and Sheba received its world premiere on 27 October 1959 at the Astoria Theatre, Charing Cross Road, London, where it was presented in 70mm.

=== Critical reception ===
Solomon and Sheba received indifferent to negative reviews and Yul Brynner's performance was criticized by no less than the film's director, King Vidor, who stated that Tyrone Power had been much more believable as a conflicted king than Brynner who apparently played it with too much self-assurance. Variety, however, praised some of the film's sequences as "magnificent production scenes" and described Lollobrigida as showing "the queen to be a woman of sharp brain as well as sensual beauty." The magazine also stated that Brynner "does a fine job in presenting a Solomon who credibly suggests a singer of songs, yet finally is a man of ordinary flesh and blood who cannot resist Sheba."

The film was included in the 1978 book, The Fifty Worst Films of All Time (and How They Got That Way), by Harry Medved, Randy Dreyfuss, and Michael Medved.

=== Box office ===
The film was a box office success, earning an estimated $5.5 million in North American rentals with a total gross of $12.2 million.

=== Telecast ===
The film would be broadcast on NBC Saturday Night at the Movies on July 19, 1975.

== Home media ==
In August 2022, the film was released on Blu-ray by Sandpiper Pictures.

== Comic book adaptation ==
- Dell Four Color #1070 (December 1959)

== See also ==
- 1959 in film
- List of American films of 1959
- The Bible in film
