= Super Panavision 70 =

Motion picture film format

- Type: Filmmaking technology
- Inventor: Mike Todd; Robert Gottschalk
- Inception: 1959
- Manufacturer: Panavision
- Models: System 65 (since 1985)

Super Panavision 70 is the marketing brand name used to identify movies photographed with Panavision 70 mm spherical optics between 1959 and 1983. It has since been replaced by Panavision System 65.

Ultra Panavision 70 was similar to Super Panavision 70, though Ultra Panavision lenses were anamorphic, which allowed for a significantly wider aspect ratio. However, Ultra Panavision 70 was extremely rare and has only been used on a handful of films since its inception.

== History ==
During the late 1950s, the Hollywood filmmaking community decided that changing from filming in the commonly accepted 35 mm format to 65 mm film would provide viewing audiences with an enhanced visual experience, compared to an anamorphic widescreen image. To this end, cameras began to be designed to handle 65 mm film stock. The first camera system to be released using this format was Todd-AO, in 1955. The second was MGM Camera 65, a system designed by Panavision, which was introduced in 1956. In 1959, Panavision introduced Super Panavision 70 to compete with these two systems. Unlike its counterpart Ultra Panavision 70, which used anamorphic lenses, Super Panavision used spherical lenses to create a final aspect ratio of 2.20:1, the same as Todd-AO.

Some of the films made in Super Panavision 70 were presented in 70 mm Cinerama in select theaters. Special optics were used to project the 70 mm prints onto a deeply curved screen to mimic the effect of the original three-strip Cinerama process.

Unlike formats such as Super 16 and Super 35, the "super" designation does not denote a modification of the film frame, but was rather to distinguish it as being of superior quality to 35 mm anamorphic Panavision. The terms "Super Panavision 70", "Panavision 70" and "Super Panavision" were interchangeable, whereas the term "70 mm Panavision" referred to films shot in 35 mm anamorphic Panavision and blown up to 70 mm for release.

== Films using Super Panavision 70 ==
- The Big Fisherman (1959)
- Exodus (1960)
- West Side Story (1961)
- Lawrence of Arabia (1962)
- My Fair Lady (1964)
- Cheyenne Autumn (1964)
- Lord Jim (1965)
- Grand Prix (1966) – presented in 70 mm Cinerama
- 2001: A Space Odyssey (1968) – presented in 70 mm Cinerama
- Ice Station Zebra (1968) – presented in 70 mm Cinerama
- Chitty Chitty Bang Bang (1968)
- Mackenna's Gold (1969)
- Krakatoa, East of Java (1969) – selected scenes in Todd-AO – presented in 70 mm Cinerama
- Song of Norway (1970) – advertised as "on the Cinerama screen" in some countries
- Ryan's Daughter (1970)
- Close Encounters of the Third Kind (1977) – special effects shots only; early promotional material erroneously suggested that the entire film was produced in Super Panavision 70
- Tron (1982) – 'Real world' live-action filmed in color 65 mm; Computer world live action filmed in 65 mm B&W, composited to a VistaVision intermediate, and optically printed back to 70 mm IP. CGI sequences recorded to VistaVision.
- Brainstorm (1983) – virtual reality sequences only
- Auto-E-Motion (1984) – BMW promotional short subject
- The Abyss (1989) – special effects shots only
- Warriors of the Wasteland (1989) - short film
- Apollo 11 (2019)

== Panavision System 65/Super 70 ==
In 1991, as a response to an increased demand for 65 mm cameras (in the mid-1980s Steven Spielberg had wanted to film Empire of the Sun in Super Panavision 70 but did not want to work with the old 65 mm camera equipment), Panavision introduced an updated line of 65 mm cameras and optics known as Panavision System 65 and monikered in advertising and release prints as Panavision Super 70. The system was designed to compete with the parallel development of the Arriflex 765 camera. The new System 65 camera was self-blimped, with reflex viewing designed as the 65 mm cousin to the 35 mm Panaflex camera (and used many of the same accessories). Only two System 65 cameras were ever built, and the small fleet of old 65 mm handheld reflex cameras had their lens mounts modified to accept the System 65 lenses. The System 65 lenses were all a medium-format variant of lens designs from the (then) current line of Panavision Primos. All System 65 telephoto lenses (i.e. 300 mm, 400 mm, 500 mm) were converted Canon telephotos.

In the wake of the modest box office reception for the first Panavision System 65/Super 70 feature Far and Away, combined with the fact that 35 mm digital surround sound had arrived and minimized the multi-channel sound advantage the 70 mm format had, meant that a hoped-for renaissance in 65/70 mm film production never materialized. In the 2010s, this renaissance finally materialized following a string of successful films from director Christopher Nolan, which were produced and screened in 70 mm IMAX. Following the effort made by Quentin Tarantino and Boston Light & Sound to restore a large fleet of 70 mm projectors for the release of The Hateful Eight, 70 mm projection once again became available to non-IMAX venues.

== Films using Panavision System 65/Super 70 ==
- Far and Away (1992) – During the "land rush" sequence, slow motion footage was filmed with Arri 765 cameras; plus a 35 mm VistaVision camera and several 35 mm Panavision cameras with anamorphic lenses were used.
- Dead Sea (1992) – short film released in the Los Angeles area
- Hamlet (1996)
- The Witness (1998) – short film produced for the Mashantucket Pequot Museum in Connecticut
- Spider-Man 2 (2004) – selected special effects shots only
- The New World (2005) – "hyper-reality" scenes only
- Inception (2010) – "key sequences"
- Shutter Island (2010) – some scenes
- The Tree of Life (2011) – selected scenes
- Samsara (2011) – the first feature film photographed entirely in 65 mm since Hamlet; theatrical release was presented in 4K digital projection and 35 mm anamorphic prints
- Snow White & the Huntsman (2012) – selected wide shots and second unit work
- The Dark Knight Rises (2012) – selected scenes
- The Master (2012) – The projected frame on 70 mm release prints (and all digital prints) were "hard matted" to 1.85:1, clipping the sides and throwing away 16.3% of the full frame exposed on the 2.20:1 aspect ratio 65 mm negative. About 85% of the film was photographed in Panavision System 65; the rest was shot in spherical 35 mm with a 1.85:1 aspect ratio.
- To the Wonder (2012) – some scenes
- Jurassic World (2015) – some scenes
- Knight of Cups (2015) – some scenes
- Batman v Superman: Dawn of Justice (2016) – some scenes
- Dunkirk (2017) – scenes that were not shot on 65 mm IMAX film, about 25% of the film
- Murder on the Orient Express (2017)
- Christopher Robin (2018) – some scenes
- The Nutcracker and the Four Realms (2018) – scenes that were not shot in 3-perf Super 35
- Tenet (2020) – scenes that were not shot on 65 mm IMAX film, some scenes were filmed with Arri 765 cameras, about 74 minutes of the film.
- Wonder Woman 1984 (2020) - some scenes
- No Time to Die (2021) – some action scenes
- Death on the Nile (2022)
- Jurassic World Dominion (2022) – some scenes
- Nope (2022) – scenes that were not shot on 65 mm IMAX film.
- Oppenheimer (2023) - scenes that were not shot on 65 mm IMAX film.

== See also ==
- 70 mm film
- Cinerama
- Super Technirama 70
- Todd-AO
- Ultra Panavision 70
