= Khartoum (1966 film) =

1966 film by Basil Dearden

- Theatrical release poster
- Directed by: Basil Dearden
- Written by: Robert Ardrey
- Produced by: Julian Blaustein
- Starring: Charlton Heston; Laurence Olivier; Richard Johnson; Ralph Richardson
- Cinematography: Edward Scaife
- Edited by: Fergus McDonell
- Music by: Frank Cordell
- Production companies: Julian Blaustein Productions, Ltd.
- Distributed by: United Artists
- Release date: 9 June 1966 (London)
- Running time: 134 minutes 128 minutes (US)
- Country: United Kingdom
- Language: English
- Budget: $6–8 million
- Box office: $3 million (est. US/Canada rentals)

Khartoum is a 1966 British epic historical war film directed by Basil Dearden from a screenplay by Robert Ardrey. It stars Charlton Heston as British General Charles "Chinese" Gordon and Laurence Olivier as Muhammad Ahmed (a Sudanese leader who proclaimed to be the Mahdi), with a supporting cast that includes Richard Johnson and Ralph Richardson. The film is based on historical accounts of Gordon's defence of the Sudanese city of Khartoum from the forces of the Mahdist army, during the 1884–1885 Siege of Khartoum. The opening and closing scenes are narrated by Leo Genn.

Khartoum was filmed on-location in Egypt by cinematographer Edward Scaife in Technicolor and Ultra Panavision 70, and was exhibited in 70 mm Cinerama in premiere engagements. This was the last movie filmed in Ultra Panavision 70 until 2015's The Hateful Eight. A novelisation of the film's screenplay was written by Alan Caillou.

The film had its Royal World Premiere at the Casino Cinerama Theatre, in the West End of London, on 9 June 1966, in the presence of Princess Margaret and the Earl of Snowdon. Khartoum earned Robert Ardrey an Oscar nomination for Best Original Screenplay. The film also earned Ralph Richardson a BAFTA Award nomination for Best British Actor.

== Plot ==
In 1883 Sudan, an army of 10,000 poorly trained but well-armed Egyptian troops is lured into the desert. Commanding the force is former Bombay Army soldier Colonel William "Billy" Hicks, now a private individual paid by the Egyptian government. Hicks' army is defeated by native tribesmen led by Muhammad Ahmed, a Nubian religious leader of the Samaniyya order who has declared himself Mahdi. The Mahdi's forces kill the troops and capture their weapons.

British Prime Minister William Ewart Gladstone, does not wish to send any military forces to Khartoum but is under great pressure, mostly from the British press, to "avenge" the death of Hicks, a hero of previous colonial conflicts. He could send colonial military hero Major General Charles George Gordon who has strong ties to Sudan, having tried to break the slave trade there, but Gladstone mistrusts him. Gordon has a reputation for strong and eccentric religious beliefs, and following his own judgment regardless of his orders. Lord Granville, the Foreign Secretary, knows this; he tells Gladstone that by sending Gordon to Khartoum, the British government can ignore all public pressure to send an army there. Should Gordon ignore his orders, the government can absolve themselves of any responsibility over the area. Gladstone is mildly shocked at the suggestion, but as it is popular with the public and Queen Victoria, he adopts it for the sake of expediency.

Gordon is told that his mission, to evacuate troops and civilians, is unsanctioned by the British government, which will disavow all responsibility if he fails. He is given few resources and only a single aide, Colonel J. D. H. Stewart. After an attempt to recruit former slaver Zobeir Pasha fails, Gordon and Stewart travel to Khartoum, where Gordon is hailed as the city's saviour upon his arrival in February 1884. He begins organising the defences and rallying the people, despite Stewart's protests that this is not what he was sent to do.

Gordon's first act is to visit the Mahdi in his insurgent camp, accompanied by only a single servant. He gains the Mahdi's respect and, in the verbal fencing at the parley, discovers that the Sudanese leader intends to make an example of Khartoum by taking the city and killing all its inhabitants. The River Nile city of Khartoum lies at the confluence of the White Nile and the Blue Nile. A qualified military engineer, Gordon wastes no time upon his return in digging a ditch between the two to provide a protective moat.

In Britain, Gladstone, apprised of how desperate the situation has become, orders Gordon to leave, but, as he had feared, his command is ignored. Colonel Stewart is sent by Gordon to London to explain the situation in Khartoum. Over the next several months, a public outcry forces Gladstone to send a relief force, but he sees to it that there is no urgency, hoping to the last that Gordon will come to his senses and save himself.

Gordon, however, has other ideas. News arrives in Khartoum about a relief force led by General Wolseley being sent from Britain. When the waters recede in winter, drying up his moat, the small Egyptian army is finally overwhelmed by 100,000 native Mahdist tribesmen. On 26 January 1885, the city falls under a massive frontal assault. Gordon himself is slain along with the entire foreign garrison and populace of some 30,000, although the Mahdi had forbidden killing Gordon. In the end, Gordon's head is cut off, stuck on top of a long pole, and paraded about the city in triumph, contrary to the Mahdi's injunctions.

The British relief column arrives two days too late. The British withdraw from the Sudan shortly thereafter, and the Mahdi himself dies six months later. In the United Kingdom, public pressure, and anger at the fate of Gordon, eventually forces the British and their Egyptian allies to re-invade the Sudan ten years later, and they recaptured and took control of Khartoum in 1898.

== Cast ==
- Charlton Heston as General Charles Gordon, military governor of Sudan, commander and an engineer
- Laurence Olivier as Muhammad Ahmed, the Mahdi
- Richard Johnson as Colonel John Stewart, Gordon's aide
- Ralph Richardson as William Ewart Gladstone, Prime Minister
- Alexander Knox as Sir Evelyn Baring, Consul-General of Egypt
- Johnny Sekka as Khaleel
- Nigel Green as General Wolseley, a British Army officer
- Michael Hordern as Lord Granville, British Foreign Secretary
- Peter Arne played two roles:

(1) Tewfik Pasha: Khedive of Egypt;
(2) Major Kitchener: a British Army officer

- Hugh Williams as Lord Hartington
- Zia Mohyeddin as Zobeir Pasha
- Ralph Michael as Charles Dilke
- Douglas Wilmer as Khalifa Abdullah
- Marne Maitland as Sheikh Osman
- Edward Underdown as William Hicks
- Alan Tilvern as Awaan
- Ronald Leigh-Hunt as Lord Northbrook
- Roger Delgado as Sheikh Abdul Rahim
- Alec Mango as Bordeini Bey
- George Pastell as Giriagis Bey
- Jerome Willis as Frank Power
- Joe Cornelius as Muscular Man
- Leo Genn as the narrator (voice)

== Production ==
=== Development ===
Robert Ardrey wrote the script at the encouragement of producer Julian Blaustein. Ardrey says it took him three years "on and off" to complete the script, and then sold it for $150,000. In May 1962, Metro-Goldwyn-Mayer announced that it was producing the film from Ardrey's script, with the intention to be an adventure film similar to 55 Days at Peking (1963) and Lawrence of Arabia (1962).

In October 1963, Ardrey began scouting filming locations in North Africa with Blaustein. In November 1964, Ardey told The New York Times, "Everybody was interested and nobody doubted the subject ... But there was strong feeling against the big picture which might gross $12,000,000 but cost $25,000,000. Frankly Khartoum is a proposition that could bust a studio if handled the wrong way."

In April 1964, Blaustein announced that United Artists was producing the film, with Burt Lancaster slated to star as Gordon. The following month, Laurence Olivier agreed to play the Mahdi and Lewis Gilbert signed to direct. However, filming was delayed, and Lancaster, Olivier, and Gilbert pulled out. In April 1965, Charlton Heston agreed to play Gordon. By June, Olivier was back on the film with Basil Dearden to direct. Heston loved the script calling it "one of only two scripts I can recall out of more than fifty that we shot largely without revision."

Heston wanted Carol Reed to direct, but he was not available. In March 1965, he said, "Ken Hughes seems the best bet for me," and wrote in his diary that he wanted to make the film because "it's a good part, presents the challenge of doing a mystic as well as the English thing. Also, it's a helluva good script." Basil Dearden was suggested but Heston watched his films and felt they were "dependent... on plot rather than character. Khartoum is character over plot so this doesn't help." In April, the film was rejected by Guy Hamilton. "For a script as good as this, we're taking a hell of a long time to get a good director," wrote Heston. Within a few days, however, they had signed Basil Dearden. "We could do much worse," wrote Heston. A few weeks later he wrote, "I'm still a little cool on the idea of Dearden to direct Khartoum, but we're committed on it. One thing I must learn better: Don't commit till you're sure. There are moral and creative considerations involved, but it's also a simple question of people's feelings." A few days later Heston met Dearden, "who impresses me about as his films do: seriously but not overwhelmingly. I guess my prime enthuasiam for this one is for the script rather than the director."

Christopher Plummer was considered for Stewart but he was too expensive. In July 1965, Ralph Richardson and Richard Johnson had joined the cast as Prime Minister Gladstone and Colonel Stewart, respectively. Johnson and Heston would work together again several more times.

=== Filming ===
Principal photography began at Pinewood Studios on 9 August 1965. Meanwhile, second-unit filming was placed under Yakima Canutt and cinematographer Harry Waxman. A month later, filming relocated to Cairo. Michael Relph worked on the film uncredited. The introductory documentary sequence was directed by photographer Eliot Elisofon.

By October, location shooting had finished and the production went on hiatus to give Olivier time to be available for interior scenes. The production was shut down for several weeks due to Olivier's availability. When filming finished in December, Heston wrote, "I've learned not to try and deduce from my own reactions what the public and/or critical response to a film will be. However, I like this one."

Khartoum was the last motion picture filmed in Ultra Panavision 70 until The Hateful Eight, written and directed by Quentin Tarantino 49 years later.

== Reception ==
Heston saw the film in May. He wrote in his diary, "Khartoum seemed to me to be a very, very good film. The script is literate, with some of the best writing of the year. All the performances are good, including mine." After the Los Angeles premiere in June, he wrote, "I really think we may have one of my best pictures here."

Commercial response was not strong. In July, Heston wrote that the film "is getting great notices all round, but not uniformly great business, sorry to say." He later reflected at the end of 1966, "Khartoum didn’t kill 'em, but I did good work in both and was well regarded by my peers."

=== Critical reception ===
Arthur D. Murphy of Variety called Khartoum "an action-filled entertainment pic which contrasts personal nobility with political expediency. The colorful Julian Blaustein production builds in spectacular display, enhanced by Cinerama presentation, while Charlton Heston and Laurence Olivier propel toward inevitable tragedy, the drama of two sincere opponents." Philip K. Scheuer of the Los Angeles Times praised the film, calling it "one of the ablest pictures of its kind I've ever seen. It is a truly great spectacle, not one synthesized mainly for the sake of a wide screen in this case Cinerama. It is also exceptional in that its man-to-man confrontations in themselves have drama." Bosley Crowther of The New York Times felt the film suffered from "the efforts of everyone connected with the picture to cram too much historical detail, too much geographical display, too many incidental characters, too many battles, too much mystery into a picture that was evidently inspired by the box-office success of Lawrence of Arabia."

Clifford Terry of the Chicago Tribune unfavorably compared the film to Lawrence of Arabia, writing, "Khartoum is nothing more than a routine desert drama, full of sand and fury, signifying very little." He blamed Dearden and Ardey, criticizing his script for failing "to grasp that however complex an individual, he nevertheless has a core, and covers up the character shallowness and story inconsistencies with grandiose gab." Sight and Sound described the film as being "beautifully photographed, lavishly mounted, intelligently acted, but ultimately dull." The Times praised the film for the screenplay. Patrick Gibbs of The Daily Telegraph criticised the film for its historical inaccuracies and felt neither Olivier or Heston convey "the personal magnetism attributed" to their characters. The British publication New Statesman also criticized the film's historical inaccuracies (for example, the Mahdi did not want to kill everyone in the capital and called for killing only soldiers).

On the review aggregate website Rotten Tomatoes, 100% of 10 critics gave the film a positive review, with an average rating of 7/10. In the 21st century, historian Alex von Tunzelmann criticised the film for "factual inaccuracies" and Olivier's "unrealistic accent" and blackface makeup. Literature professor Edward Said criticized Khartoum for what he described as a pro-colonial propagandistic portrayal of good versus evil by clashing "despotically violent Arab masculinity against a noble, rational Western one." Conversely, editor Dennis Schwartz described the film as "a visually stunning historical epic, smartly acted and lavishly produced, that gives one a good look at that period’s political intrigues but does little to tell us about the two religious zealots–Gordon and the Mahdi."

In a 1978 article for Film Comment, Martin Scorsese wrote that Khartoum was one of his guilty pleasures: "Charlton Heston... is marvelous; and Laurence Olivier has a lot of fun as the Mahdi, with a space between his front teeth. It isn't very good filmmaking, but it has a mystical quality about it. This was a holy war. At the end – when Mahdi killed Gordon, and then six months later he died himself – it was as if the two of them canceled each other out, religiously and historically. It's a story I want to be told, over and over again, like a fairy tale."

=== Awards and nominations ===
Event	Category	Nominee	Result	Ref.
39th Academy Awards	Best Writing, Story and Screenplay – Written Directly for the Screen	Robert Ardrey	Nominated	
20th British Academy Film Awards	Best British Actor	Ralph Richardson	Nominated	
20th British Academy Film Awards	Best British Art Direction (Colour)	John Howell	Nominated	

== Home media ==
Khartoum was released on Blu-ray on 3 December 2018.
