= Impact of the COVID-19 pandemic on cinema =

The COVID-19 pandemic had a negative effect on certain films in the early 2020s, mirroring its impacts across all arts sectors. Across the world, and to varying degrees, cinemas and movie theaters were closed, festivals were cancelled or postponed, and film releases were moved to future dates or delayed indefinitely. Due to cinemas and movie theaters closing, the global box office dropped by billions of dollars, streaming saw a significant increase in popularity, and the stock of film exhibitors dropped dramatically. Many blockbusters originally scheduled to be released by mid-March 2020 were postponed or canceled around the world, with film productions also being halted. This in turn created openings for independent cinema productions to receive wider exposure.

By March 2020, the Chinese film industry had lost US$2 billion, as it had closed all its cinemas during the Lunar New Year, a period that typically sustained the industry across Asia. North America saw its lowest box office weekend since 1998 between March 13–15.

The highest-grossing film of 2020 was the anime film Demon Slayer: Kimetsu no Yaiba – The Movie: Mugen Train, which earned $503 million worldwide. It was the first time since 2007 that the top-grossing film of a given year had earned less than $1 billion and the first time in cinema history that a non-American film was the top-grossing film of the year. In 2021, the worldwide box office showed signs of recovery, with a 78% increase in revenue over 2020. Despite the presence of pandemic restrictions in some jurisdictions, the December 2021 release Spider-Man: No Way Home quickly became the highest-grossing film of 2021, the sixth highest-grossing film of all time just over a month after its theatrical release, and the first film since 2019 to earn more than $1 billion worldwide. Some publications regard the box-office success of Spider-Man: No Way Home as the end of the pandemic era for the film industry.

== Box office ==
Ticket sales revenue has declined since the mid-2010s, not fully recovering from declines during the COVID-19 pandemic when many theaters were closed.

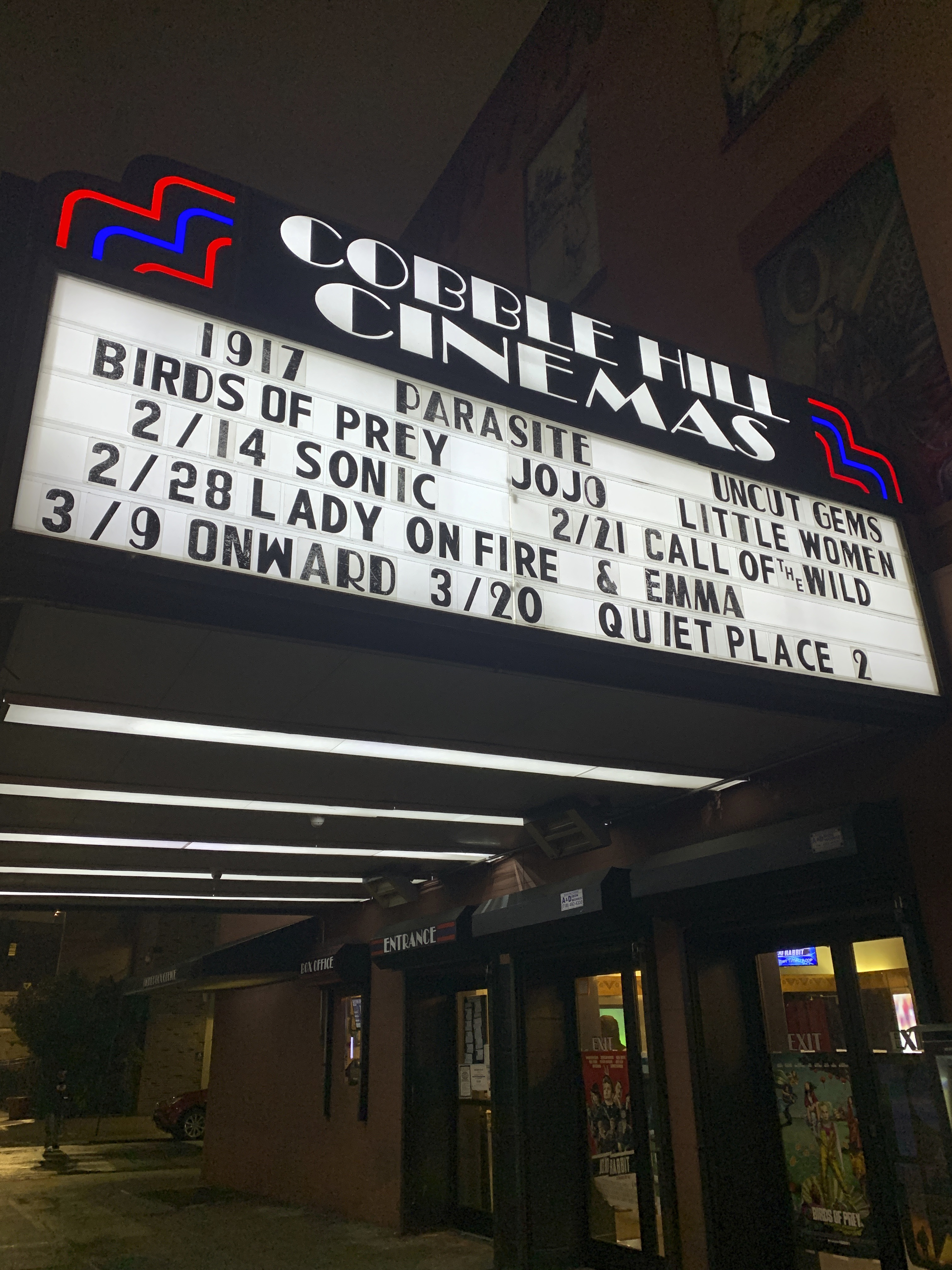
Cobble Hill Cinemas in Brooklyn, New York announcing its showings in February 2020; A Quiet Place Part II's release was subsequently postponed.

In early March 2020, it was predicted that the global box office could lose US$5 billion as a result of the pandemic.

Countries that were pandemic hot-spots closed or restricted cinemas and movie theaters, negatively affecting film revenue. Attendance was also lower in other regions. Following the pandemic in mainland China, 70,000 cinemas were closed in January 2020. In the first two months of 2020, China's box office was down to US$3.9 million, compared to US$2.148 billion in the first two months of 2019. Later, as a result of the pandemic in Italy, on March 8, 2020, the Italian government ordered all cinemas to be closed for a month. Before the closure, box office tracking estimated a 94% drop for the weekend of March 6–8 compared to the same period the previous year. As the pandemic grew in France, cinemas operated at half capacity, leaving strategic seats unavailable to reduce proximity between people, a move followed days later by the Irish and Northern Irish cinema chain Omniplex Cinemas. On March 12, Qatar also closed all cinemas, as did the US on March 17, Malaysia and Thailand on March 18, the UK on March 20, Australia and New Zealand on March 22, and Singapore on March 27. After a state of emergency was declared in Tokyo and six other prefectures in Japan on April 7, over 220 cinemas were closed.

Percentage box office losses (outside of mainland China) for January to March 3, 2020, were 70–75% in Italy, 60% in South Korea, 35% in Hong Kong, the Philippines, and Singapore, and 30% in Taiwan. The Los Angeles box office, a key movie market and local economic backbone, was projected to fall by 20% in April 2020 compared to its 2019 figures, based on the state of emergency declared in the county at the start of March 2020. Despite the state of emergency, as single screens within movie theatres did not hold more than 1,000 people, they were granted an exemption from the ban on mass public gatherings in California. A Cinema United representative for California and Nevada announced that theatres would stay open; historically, movie theatres had remained open during other similar emergencies. However, a survey of Americans over the opening March weekend showed support for closing movie theaters. On March 15, Deadline reported that over 100 movie theaters in the US had closed, some due to local rulings and others because of an inability to keep them open with no demand. On March 17, with national restrictions to social gatherings, cinemas across the United States closed. However, drive-in theaters, where customers stay in their own cars, were not closed, and quickly grew in popularity again.

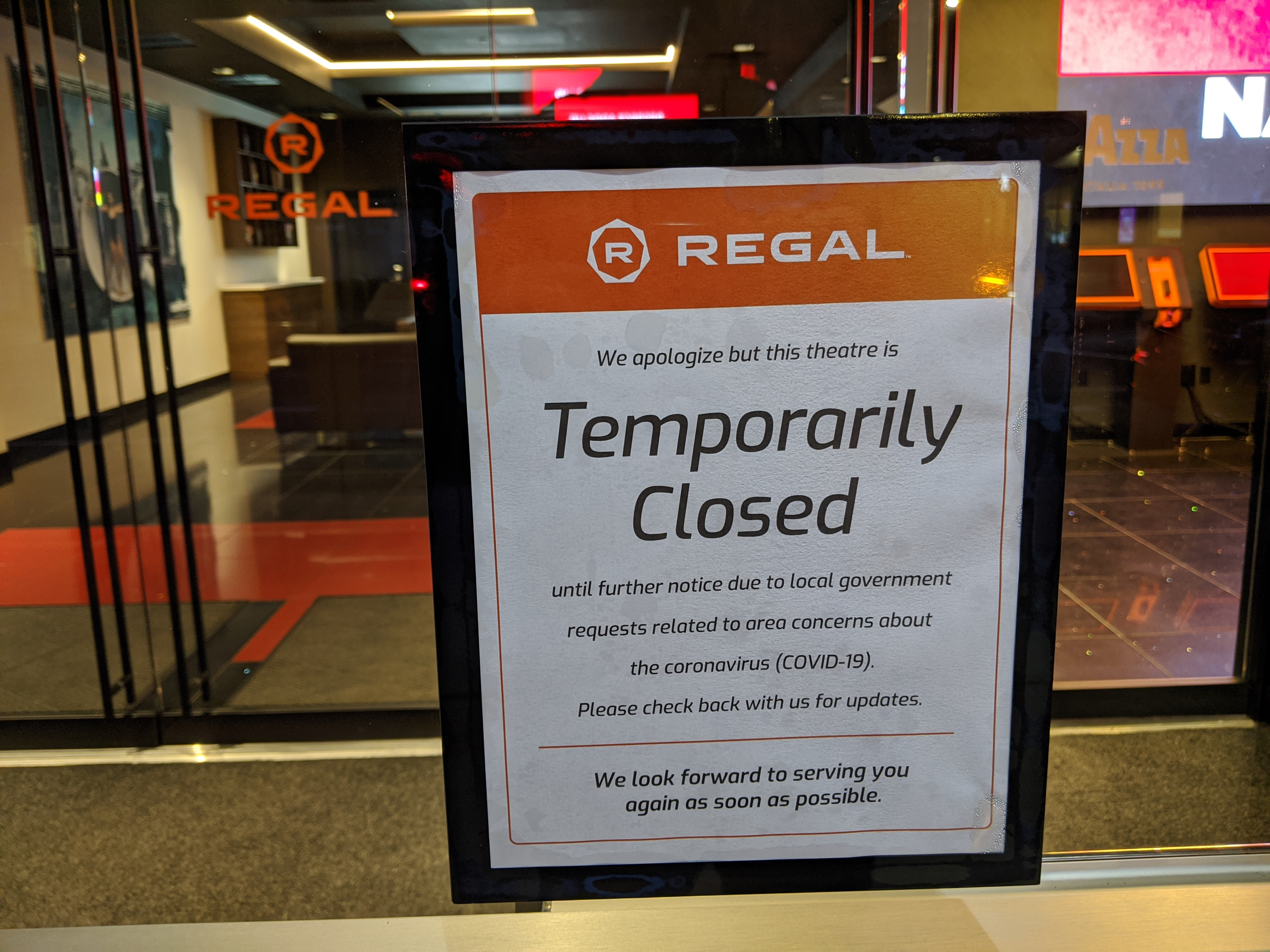
The sign on the door of a closed Regal movie theater in New York City, March 2020; Regal Cinemas reopened most of their theaters on August 21, 2020, re-closed them on October 8, 2020, and has been reopened since April 2, 2021.

The opening March weekend saw a dramatically lower box office than the same weekend in 2019. The 2019 opening March weekend saw the release of Captain Marvel, which alone earned over US$153 million domestically that weekend, compared to the 2020 weekend's biggest film, Onward, with around US$39 million. The next weekend saw the lowest total US box office intake since the October 30–November 1, 1998 weekend, with lower percentage drops than the weekend after 9/11, at US$55.3 million. Onward itself saw the biggest weekend-to-weekend drop of any Pixar film, making $10.5 million, though was still the weekend's biggest film and the only one to make over $10 million. On March 19, Walt Disney Studios and Universal Pictures announced that they would no longer report box office figures. Comscore, therefore, announced the next day that it would indefinitely suspend its reporting of box office estimates and charts.

On March 26, 2020, after local transmission of the virus had dropped to 0% in China, movie theaters there began to re-open, with reports that 250–500 theaters were opening. The next day, authorities again closed all movie theaters in the country.

== Scheduling ==
=== Awards ===
Three award ceremonies were held after the coronavirus became widespread: the 10th Magritte Awards on February 1, the 45th César Awards on February 28, and the 43rd Japan Academy Film Prize on March 6. The Japanese Academy Prize ceremony also took place on March 6, however the ceremony was conducted without any guests or journalists. The 14th Seiyu Awards cancelled its live ceremony scheduled for March 7 in Tokyo and instead broadcast the winners on Nippon Cultural Broadcasting's internet radio program. The 40th Golden Raspberry Awards were initially intended to take place as planned on March 14, however it was ultimately cancelled. The ceremony's winners were announced on their YouTube channel on March 16.

The International Indian Film Academy Awards, planned to take place on March 27, were cancelled, while the Italian Academy's David di Donatello ceremony was postponed from April 3 to May 8. The American Film Institute's lifetime achievement ceremony to honour Dame Julie Andrews was pushed back from April to the summer. The 2020 Platino Awards were also postponed.

The Academy Awards and Golden Globe Awards modified their eligibility criteria for their 2021 editions, as they usually require that a film be screened theatrically for a minimum length of time. The Hollywood Foreign Press Association mentioned that films released via non-theatrical means (such as digital) would be eligible if they were scheduled to have a "bona fide theatrical release" in Los Angeles after March 15 (with a cutoff date to be determined). The Best Foreign Language Film award would similarly offer eligibility for films originally scheduled for a theatrical release in their country of origin between March 15 and a date to be determined. The 93rd Academy Awards would also allow films released via password-protected or transactional video on demand to be eligible if they were originally scheduled to have a theatrical release. Once cinemas had sufficiently resumed operations, the requirement that a film be screened for at least a week would be reinstated. In addition to Los Angeles, eligible screenings would also be allowed to take place in one of five other major U.S. cities.

On June 15, it was announced that the Academy Awards would be pushed back by two months, from February 28 to April 25, so that the cutoff for eligibility could likewise be extended from December 31, 2020, to February 28. The Academy Governors Awards and Scientific and Technical Awards were postponed indefinitely. The British Academy of Film and Television Arts (BAFTA) subsequently announced that it would follow suit and postpone the 74th British Academy Film Awards to April. On June 22, the Golden Globe Awards were also delayed from early-January to February 28, 2021 (filling the Academy Awards' former date). The Screen Actors Guild Awards were also postponed from January 24 to March 14.

With the delay of the 2021 Grammy Awards to March 14, citing the surge of COVID-19 cases in California, on January 13, 2021, the SAG Awards were delayed once again to April 4. SAG-AFTRA criticized The Recording Academy for not respecting the scheduling of other award presentations.

In Canada, the pandemic shutdown forced the cancellation of both the 8th Canadian Screen Awards and the 22nd Quebec Cinema Awards. Both programs ultimately announced their winners through virtual livestreaming with the Canadian Screen Awards presenting film winners on May 28, and the Quebec Cinema Awards presented on June 10.

The Omicron variant, which had particularly affected Los Angeles and New York City in the U.S., led to further disruption of the awards season in January 2022. The 27th Critics' Choice Awards were postponed to March 13, 2022, the same day as the 75th British Academy Film Awards, while the 49th Annie Awards were delayed to March 12, and the 79th Golden Globe Awards were held under strict COVID-19 protocols with only HFPA beneficiaries in attendance. The ceremony had already been downsized into a non-televised event due to boycotts of the organization by media companies and creatives (including its regular broadcaster NBC) over the lack of diversity among its membership. (Note: Attributed to multiple references:)

=== Festivals ===
Many festivals and events were cancelled or postponed. Postponements included the Thessaloniki Documentary Festival, originally set to begin on March 5, 2020, and rescheduled for June 2020; the Beijing International Film Festival, planned for April 2020 was postponed indefinitely; the Prague International Film Festival, moved from late March to sometime later in 2020; the Bentonville Film Festival, set for April 29 – May 2 was moved to August; the Istanbul International Film Festival, set for April 10–21 was postponed to a later date in 2020; and the Tribeca Film Festival. The Cinequest Film & Creativity Festival, a two-week festival in March, experienced low attendance during its first week and postponed its second week to August 2020. The 20th Beverly Hills Film Festival scheduled for April 1–15 was postponed indefinitely. The 38th Fajr International Film Festival, scheduled for April 16–24 in Tehran, was postponed with plans to then organize the event in late spring. The 2020 Metro Manila Summer Film Festival, originally scheduled for April 11–21, was also postponed after the decision to place Metro Manila (the epicenter of the COVID-19 pandemic in the Philippines) was announced, however, it was later cancelled.

Canceled events included the Swiss International Film Festival and Forum on Human Rights, planned for early March; the Red Sea International Film Festival, which was to be held for the first time in March 2020; the March 2020 South by Southwest (SXSW), which would have included film screenings; the 2020 BFI Flare: London LGBTIQ+ Film Festival; Nickelodeon's 2020 Slimefest festival; Qumra, the Doha Film Institute's international directors' conference; Hong Kong Filmart, a large film market event; the National Association of Theatre Owners' CinemaCon 2020; and Lille's Series Mania television festival. The 22nd edition of Ebertfest and the 44th edition of the Cleveland International Film Festival were cancelled. New Jersey's global film festival, Garden State Film Festival, scheduled for March 25–29, cancelled their in-person Asbury Park-based festival, however, it proceeded with the original schedule in a real-time live-streaming online format. The 55th Karlovy Vary International Film Festival was canceled and postponed to 2021; its organizers later announced plans to hold an unofficial "54 ½" edition in November, but it was cancelled due to the reinstatement of restrictions in the country.

The 2020 Cannes Film Festival sent out invitations on March 6, despite France implementing limits on public gatherings beyond its scheduled dates; the Cannes Television Festivals Canneseries and MIPTV chose not to run, however, with Canneseries rescheduling for October and MIPTV canceling its event. On March 19, 2020, the Festival de Cannes announced that it could be held on the scheduled dates, from May 12–23. Several options were considered in order to preserve its running, the main one being a simple postponement, in Cannes, until the end of June-beginning of July 2020. At the time, Cannes' main venue had been converted into a temporary homeless shelter.

Some festivals, including Tribeca, SXSW, ReelAbilities, TCM Classic Film Festival, and the Greenwich International Film Festival created new online programming in lieu of having an in-person festival. The 2020 Toronto International Film Festival planned to proceed at least partially online; on July 30, TIFF programmers announced a much smaller than normal lineup of feature films that would be screened at drive-in theatre venues and online.

Within the industry, it was suggested at the time that after the pandemic had been contained and major events rescheduled, the less-important business events and festivals might be permanently removed from industry calendars, to allow more important events to happen in an effort to ease finances of the industry as it entered a recession brought about by coronavirus-caused losses.

The Tribeca Film Festival and YouTube worked with several international partner film festivals to launch We Are One: A Global Film Festival, an international online festival of films screening for free on YouTube between May 29 and June 7, 2020.

Due to the unprecedented interruption of film productions caused by the pandemic, the Locarno Film Festival in Switzerland asked directors, including Lucrecia Martel and Lav Diaz, to select films from the festival's 74-year history for a retrospective that were screened online and in physical locations.

The Toronto International Film Festival announced that it would make "masks optional" once attendees were seated for film screenings. The actions were criticized for creating a potential superspreader event as the social nature of the festival was expected to increase the risk for COVID-19 transmission. It reversed the decision within 24 hours, citing a surge of new cases in Ontario.

The Oceanside International Film Festival screened virtually online in August 2020.

The Tribeca Film Institute, a fundraising and educational non-profit, suspended operations on September 1, 2020, due to "uncertainties surrounding our new reality." The Tribeca Film Festival, which operates under the same parent company, continued to operate.

The Horrible Imaginings Film Festival extended their usual three day event to seven days for virtual screenings in 2020.

The Provincetown International Film Festival and its associated non-profit laid off its newly hired CEO and eight other staff members in 2020 due to the pandemic.

The San Diego International Film Festival, held in October 2020, screened both online and on drive-in screens.

In September 2021, it was announced that a person with COVID-19 attended several screenings at the 2021 Toronto International Film Festival. Films affected included Dune, Bergman Island and The Humans.

The San Diego Women's Film Festival held their last event in 2021 and folded into a "Women's Series" at the San Diego International Film Festival due to infrastructure issues created by the impact of the pandemic.

=== Films ===
==== Theatrical releases ====
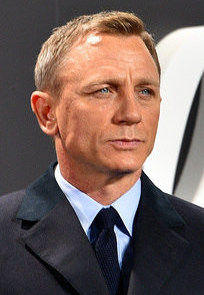
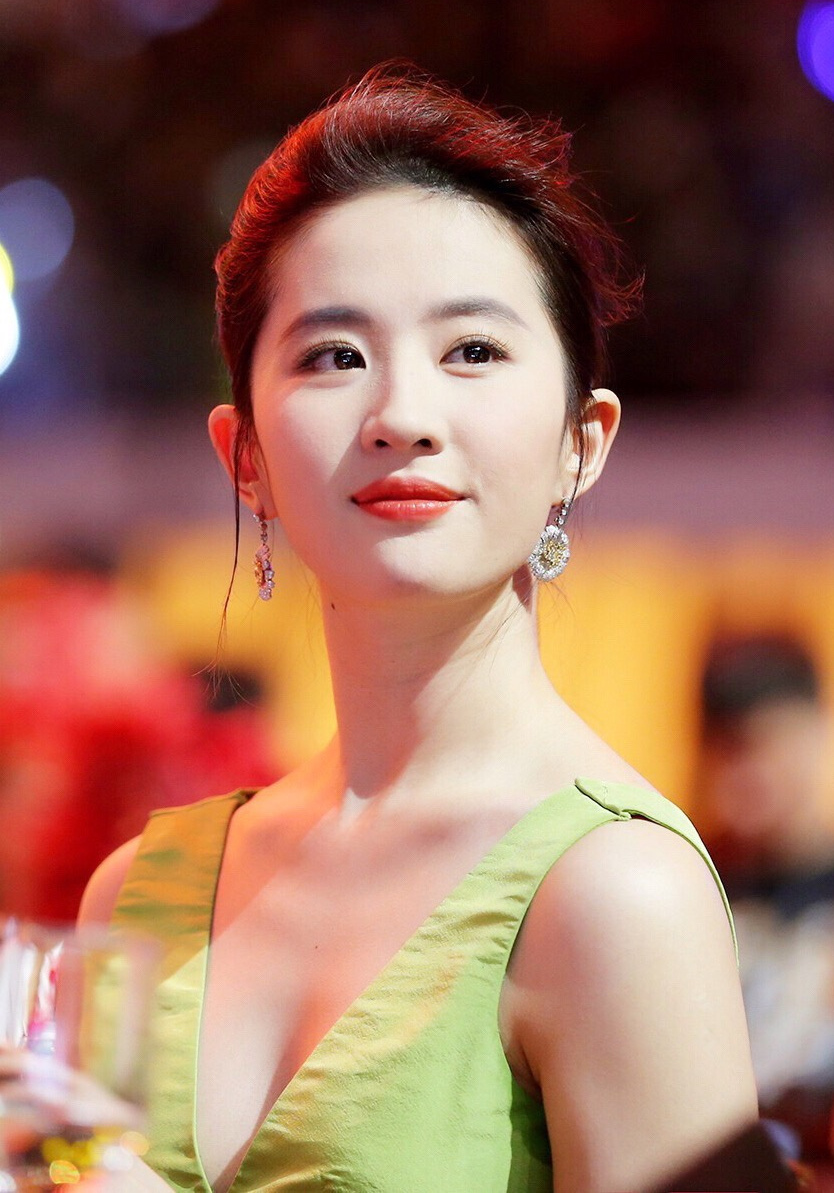
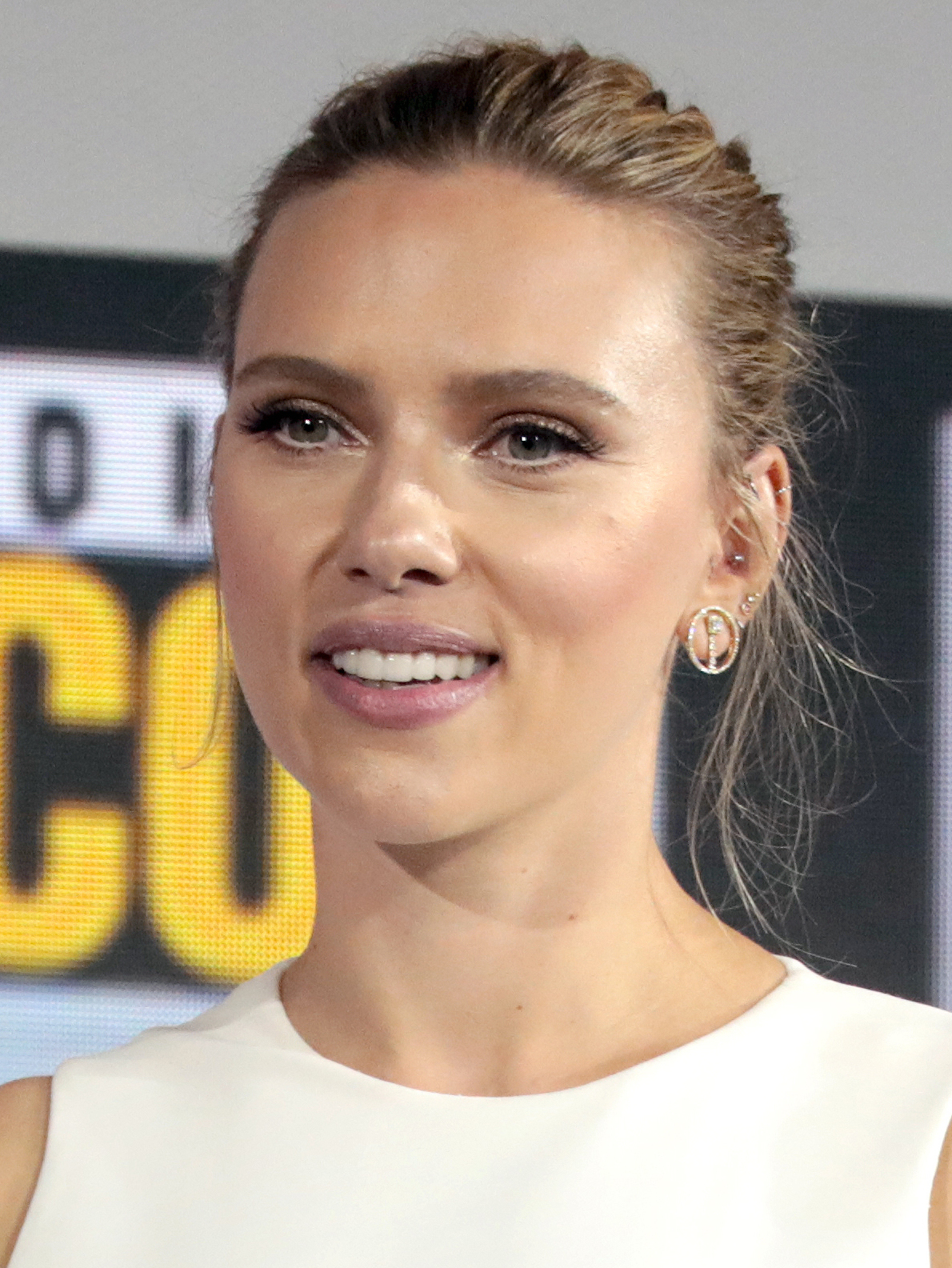
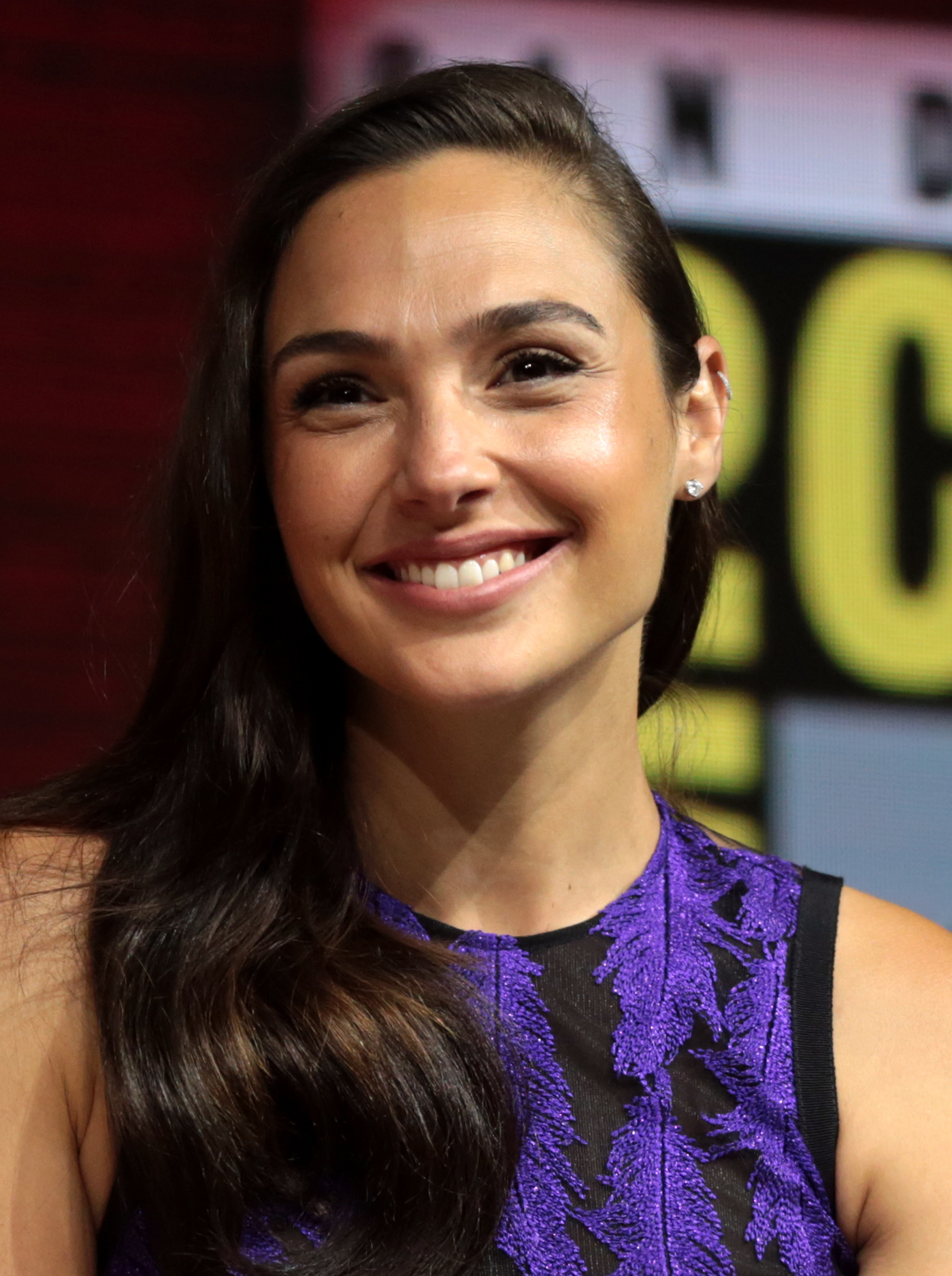
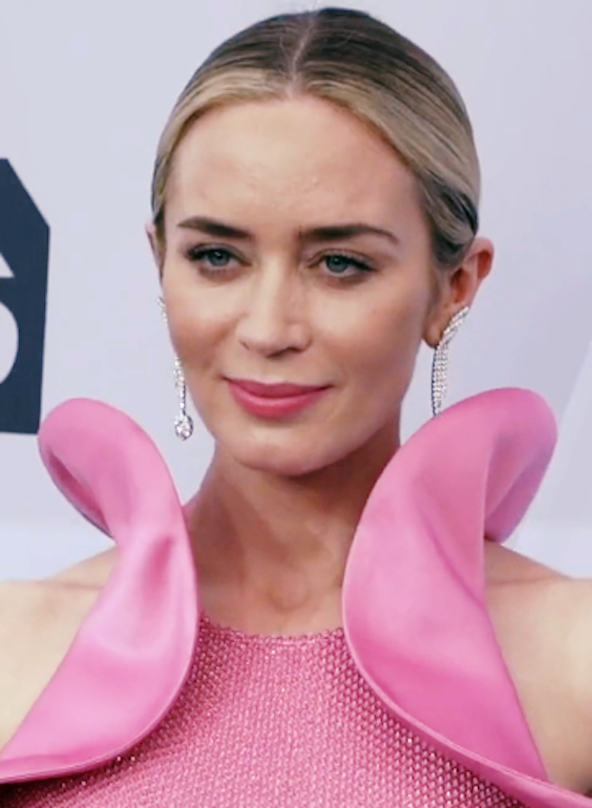
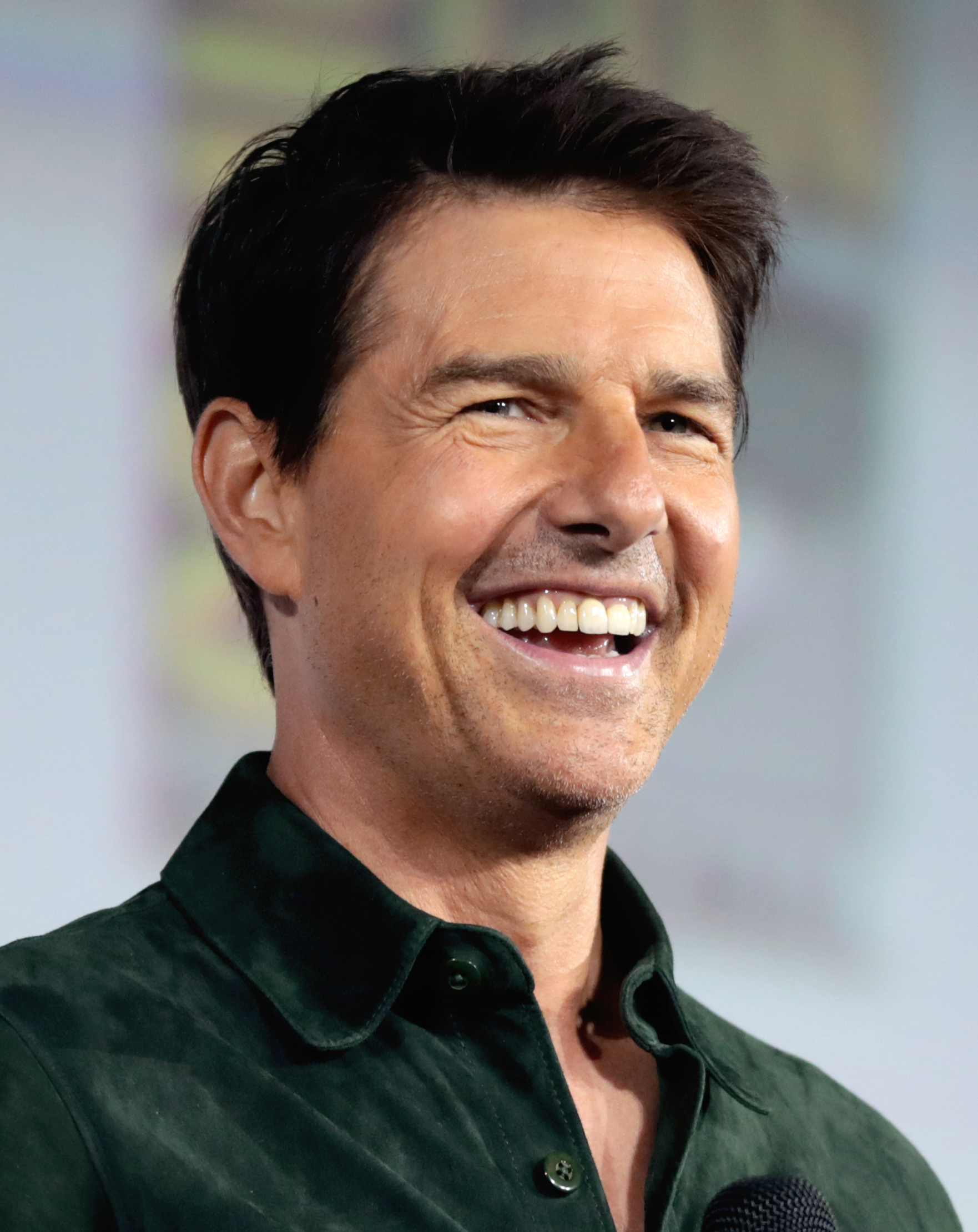
(Top row L to R) Daniel Craig, Liu Yifei, Scarlett Johansson and (bottom row L to R) Gal Gadot, Emily Blunt, and Tom Cruise, the stars of No Time to Die, Mulan, Black Widow, Wonder Woman 1984, A Quiet Place Part II, Top Gun: Maverick, Mission: Impossible – Dead Reckoning Part One and Mission: Impossible – The Final Reckoning have had their film releases affected.

On January 22, 2020, the Chinese blockbuster Lost in Russia canceled its theatrical release and was sent to streaming platforms. It was made available to watch for free, a move said to encourage people to watch it and stay home. The next day, all theaters in China were closed. On January 31, Enter the Fat Dragon also premiered online. Lost in Russia was streamed by 180 million accounts in the first three days after its release; China's highest-grossing film (and the highest-grossing non-English film ever) was 2017's Wolf Warrior 2, which had sold a total of over 160 million tickets worldwide. At the beginning of February, American films set to premiere in China over February and March were officially canceled. Chinese media companies began making more films free online through January. Asian markets also saw Chinese and Hong Kong film distributors cancel exports over the Lunar New Year holiday, including for the films Vanguard, Detective Chinatown 3, The Rescue, and Legend of Deification; Taiwanese film Do You Love Me As I Love You had its Asian release moved to April. The Lunar New Year holiday is a large market for film releases across Asia, but was stunted in 2020 as the outbreak began rapidly spreading over this period of time.

At the start of March, the James Bond film No Time to Die, which was scheduled to premiere in March 2020 and to wide release in April 2020, was postponed to November and then subsequently to April 2021. No Time to Die was the first film to change its planned release outside of China because of the early outbreak of COVID-19. Several other films soon followed in postponing their releases worldwide: the heavily promoted Polish slasher film W lesie dziś nie zaśnie nikt (Nobody Sleeps in the Woods Tonight) was postponed from March 13 to some point in the future when the situation had settled, and the political documentary Slay the Dragon had its theatrical release moved from March 13 to April 3.

The sequel Peter Rabbit 2: The Runaway was initially scheduled to be released in the United Kingdom and the US in late March and early April respectively, but due to uncertainty over the outbreak, the film was postponed to early August before being postponed once again to December 11, 2020, and January 15, 2021, respectively. Sony Pictures, the film's production company, said that the changes internationally were because of coronavirus fears, with the US release moved in sync over worries of pirate copies, and because the rival children's film DreamWorks/Universal's Trolls World Tour had moved its release date earlier. Trolls World Tour's was rescheduled to what would have been No Time to Die's weekend (both are distributed by Universal), and made it the biggest film release in April.

Other major films also postponed releases in certain countries. The Pixar film Onward, released on the opening March weekend, was not opened in the areas most affected by the coronavirus outbreak; while cinemas were closed in China, it also chose not to open in South Korea, Italy or Japan. Other March 2020 releases A Quiet Place Part II and Mulan were also postponed in affected areas. This prompted worry that, should March film openings underperform, blockbusters set for release in May (specifically Disney/Marvel's Black Widow and Universal's F9) would move their dates later in the calendar. However, A Quiet Place Part II had its world premiere on New York City on March 8 scheduled as planned. Mulan not opening in China, where it aimed to make most of its money, was particularly concerning, especially with the possibility that pirate copies would appear and divert Chinese moviegoers from going to see it in cinemas when it was released. Comparatively, A Quiet Place Part II had not anticipated a large Chinese draw, as the box office for the first film in the country was only 10% of its total.

On March 12, 2020, it was announced that the global release of A Quiet Place Part II would be delayed. It was first rescheduled to September 4, 2020, in time for the Labor Day weekend, then to April 23, 2021, before postponing again to September 17, which was again delayed until May 28, 2021. On the same day, the release of Indian film Sooryavanshi, which was initially scheduled to release on March 24, was postponed indefinitely, and the release of F9 was pushed to April 2, 2021. Mulan's March 12 London premiere went ahead without a red carpet, and on March 13, it was announced that the film was removed from the release calendar. Mulan was rescheduled for July 24, 2020, taking the release date of another Disney film Jungle Cruise and was further delayed by four weeks to August 21, 2020. With no further rescheduling options, Mulan was removed from the release calendar again.

Disney also postponed the releases of Antlers and The New Mutants, but not Black Widow. This was speculated to be because the other films are standalone, while moving Black Widow – the first film of the Marvel Cinematic Universe: Phase Four – would affect the development and distribution of the future Marvel Cinematic Universe and the Marvel Disney+ works. Disney held off on an early postponement announcement until March 17, when they postponed Black Widow and their other May releases, The Personal History of David Copperfield and The Woman in the Window. Though it had earlier been speculated that Black Widow would be able to take Marvel's November release date planned for Eternals, it was not initially given a new date. On April 3, 2020, Black Widow was rescheduled to November 6, 2020, taking the release date of the aforementioned Eternals. Three months later, on July 25, 2020, Disney announced that Antlers would be released on February 19, 2021, nearly a year later after it was originally scheduled. In August 2020, Disney announced that it cancelled the theatrical release of Mulan in North America and would premiere the film on Disney+ with Premier Access instead. It went on to have a theatrical release in select countries, including China. On September 23, Disney postponed Black Widow to May 7, 2021, Death on the Nile to December 18, 2020, and West Side Story to December 10, 2021. As a result, Eternals was also delayed to November 5, 2021, in order to maintain the MCU continuity.

Warner Bros. followed Disney by announcing the postponement of the rest of their upcoming slate on March 24, 2020. Tenet was pushed from July 17, 2020, to July 31, 2020, then August 12, 2020 before it was held up indefinitely. Wonder Woman 1984 was pushed to August 14, 2020, then to October 2, 2020, and then again to December 25, 2020, with Scoob!, In the Heights, and Malignant being delayed indefinitely. This resulted in Scoob! not having a theatrical release in North America and going straight to video on demand, while In the Heights moved to its new release date of June 18, 2021. Prior to this, on March 19, Universal and Illumination announced that Minions: The Rise of Gru had been pulled from its intended release date of July 3, 2020, not only due to the pandemic but also due to the temporary closing of its French Illumination Mac Guff animation studio in response to the pandemic, leaving the film's animation unfinished for its original date. On April 1, 2020, the film was rescheduled for July 2, 2021 taking the planned release date of Sing 2, a year after its original date.

The August 26 release of Tenet marked the first major American blockbuster film to be released theatrically. Due to safety concerns in the United States, the film premiered in 70 international markets through a staggered release model, before being released in select U.S. cities on September 3. Its box office revenue had reached $150 million by September 6, 2020, with a modest $20 million in the United States.

In September 2020, Sony Pictures Entertainment Chairman Tony Vinciquerra stated that the company would not release any big budget films to theatres until the pandemic was over. On October 2, No Time to Die was delayed once more to April 2, 2021, due to a requirement for the film to have "a worldwide theatrical audience". This came amid continued closures of cinemas in the key U.S. markets of Los Angeles and New York City, as well the reinstatement of restrictions in the United Kingdom due to a second wave. As Universal Pictures held the international distribution rights to No Time to Die, its film F9 was delayed to May 28, 2021 (Memorial Day weekend) as to not cannibalize it. No Time to Die was postponed again to September 30 in the UK and October 8 in the U.S. In March 2021, F9 was postponed once again to June 25.

The lack of theatrical releases from Hollywood studios resulted in an anime film—Demon Slayer: Mugen Train—becoming the first non-Hollywood film to ever top the annual worldwide box office. The film benefited from Japan's relative control of the pandemic at the time of its release, the popularity of the Demon Slayer franchise, and reduced competition from international films.

With both Los Angeles and New York City having allowed cinemas to reopen in March 2021, it was expected that film distributors would be more confident in releasing higher-profile films. During that month, Disney announced that Black Widow would open in theaters on July 9, 2021, and would also be available on Disney+ the same day with Premier Access, following the same release strategy that was used for one of the company's other films, Raya and the Last Dragon. Two more of Disney's films, Cruella and Jungle Cruise, were also given this hybrid release.

Despite the United States' progress on vaccination, spread of Delta variant intensified across the country in July 2021. As there was not yet a COVID-19 vaccine authorized for children younger than 12, a number of studios announced plans to delay films targeting families or pursue hybrid premium video on-demand (PVOD)/streaming releases; on July 31, Paramount Pictures cancelled the release of Clifford the Big Red Dog initially scheduled for September, and later rescheduled it for November with a hybrid release on Paramount+, while United Artists Releasing's The Addams Family 2 was also shifted to a hybrid PVOD release. On August 12, Sony Pictures delayed the release of Venom: Let There Be Carnage by three weeks to October 15, citing Delta variant, while it was also reported that Sony was planning to sell the distribution rights to Hotel Transylvania: Transformania to a streaming service. On September 1, 2021, Paramount announced that the releases of Jackass Forever, Top Gun: Maverick, and Mission: Impossible – Dead Reckoning Part One would be delayed to February 2022, May 2022, and July 2023, respectively, amid surging cases of Delta variant.

Some films still went on with exclusive theatrical releases; Disney decided against a hybrid release for Shang-Chi and the Legend of the Ten Rings, and used a 45-day theatrical window. It went on to gross $90 million over the four-day Labor Day long weekend, the largest four-day total for a Labor Day release since Halloween in 2007. By late-September, it had become the highest-grossing film of 2021 in the U.S. and Canada, and the first film since COVID-19 to surpass $200 million in the domestic box office. The success of Shang-Chi led to the re-evaluation of hybrid releases by Disney, which announced on September 10 that all of its remaining films for 2021 would be released exclusively in theaters.

On September 6, Sony moved the release date of Venom: Let There Be Carnage up to October 1, 2021, replacing Hotel Transylvania: Transformania on its schedule after selling it to Amazon Prime Video in a nearly $100 million deal. The film would become the second film to surpass $200 million in the domestic box office during the pandemic. Spider-Man: No Way Home, a Marvel Cinematic Universe film distributed by Sony Pictures, was released on December 17, 2021, and grossed over $601 million worldwide in its opening weekend. It also became the first film since Star Wars: The Rise of Skywalker (2019) to exceed a gross of $1 billion at the global box office. By early-January 2022, it had grossed over $1.5 billion worldwide, overtaking The Avengers as the eighth-highest-grossing film of all time.

The popularity of No Way Home, as well as other pandemic-related factors, were cited in the box office failure of another prominent holiday release, Steven Spielberg's West Side Story. Despite positive reviews, analysts argued that the film skewed towards an older audience (mainly adult women) that was still hesitant to see films in theaters due to COVID-19 risks (especially with the emergence of Omicron variant), may have lacked a prominent star, and further argued that there had been a trend of live action musical films falling out of favour among audiences (citing examples such as 2019's Cats, and 2021's In the Heights and Dear Evan Hansen). This growing trend would continue into 2022, with audiences beginning to show refusal to see and support prestige films that were not of any franchise or the comic book and horror genres in theaters for the entire second half of the year. This resulted in the major financial failures of award season titles released at that time such as Armageddon Time, Babylon, The Fabelmans, She Said, Tár, Till, and Women Talking. Although a romantic horror film, Bones and All also underperformed because of its positioning as a film released during awards season. This trend would be somewhat temporarily broken by the commercial success of The Whale in January 2023. Sam Mendes, who directed Empire of Light, which was also released during that awards season, expressed his thoughts on the situation, saying:

"In a world where Spielberg's movie, and Damien Chazelle's movie, and Alejandro Inarritu's movie, James Gray's movie, this movie... no one has gone to see them... all I can say is: it's clearly in trouble! Many of those movies were brilliantly reviewed. You know, The Fabelmans is one of the best reviewed movies of the year. It's taken $15 million at the U.S. box office. It's nearly finished its theatrical run. What hope is there for anyone? I've made a Bond movie; I made 1917 — which is an event movie but non-franchise; and I make a small movie like this. And this movie is ten times harder to publicise. And it's criticised ten times more than a Bond movie, because people are hoping it's going to make a case for the cinema, not just itself, but it has to be a masterpiece to get people out to see it."

==== Early home media releases ====
The 2019 sequel Frozen 2 was originally planned to be released on Disney+ on June 26, 2020, but was moved up to March 15, as many countries started entering lockdowns. Disney CEO Bob Chapek explained that this was because of the film's "powerful themes of perseverance and the importance of family, messages that are incredibly relevant". On March 16, 2020, Universal announced that The Invisible Man, The Hunt, and Emma – all films in theaters at the time – would be available through premium video on demand as early as March 20 at a suggested price of US$19.99 each. After suffering poor box office since its release at the start of March, Onward was made available to purchase digitally on March 20, and was added to Disney+ on April 3. Paramount announced on March 20, Sonic the Hedgehog was also planning to have an early release to video on demand, on March 31. On March 16, Warner Bros. announced that Birds of Prey would be released early to video on demand on March 24. Three days later, the studio then announced that The Way Back would also be available on video on demand the same date as Birds of Prey. On April 3, Disney announced that Artemis Fowl, a film adaptation of the 2001 novel of the same name, would be released straight to Disney+ on June 12, skipping a theatrical release entirely.

At the time, Chinese regulators, as well as the U.S. Cinema United, highly discouraged film distributors from engaging in this practice, in defense of the cinema industry.

Trolls World Tour was released directly to video-on-demand rental on April 10, with limited theatrical screenings in the U.S. via drive-in cinemas. NBC Universal CEO Jeff Shell told The Wall Street Journal on April 28 that the film had reached $100 million in revenue, and stated that the company had not ruled out performing releases "in both formats" as cinemas reopened.

On April 28, in response to Shell's comments, American chain AMC Theatres announced that it would cease the screening of Universal Pictures films effective immediately, and threatened similar actions against any other exhibitor who "unilaterally abandons current windowing practices absent good faith negotiations between us". On July 28, the two companies announced an agreement allowing Universal the option to release a film to premium video on demand after a minimum of 17 days in its theaters, with AMC receiving a cut of revenue. Universal later reached similar agreements with Cinemark Theatres and Cineplex Entertainment.

In a strategy called virtual cinema, some film distributors created new partnerships with small movie theaters and art houses to provide a portion of online streaming sales, including Kino Lorber, Film Movement, Music Box Films, Hope Runs High, and Oscilloscope Labs.

Warner Bros. Pictures announced in December 2020 that it would simultaneously release its slate of 2021 films both as theatrical releases and available for streaming on HBO Max for a period of one month. This approach, called "Project Popcorn", led to many filmmakers, production companies and theater chains to voice their disappointment and displeasure over the move, especially since they were not informed and consulted with over the move, as well as in regards to contractual and legal obligations.

In March 2021, it was announced that Warner Bros. would discontinue same-day releases in 2022, as part of an agreement the studio reached with Cineworld (which operates Regal Cinemas), and would instead use a 45-day exclusive release window for theaters. The studio made a similar deal with AMC Theatres in August 2021.

Pixar's Luca went directly to Disney+ in the U.S. and Canada on June 18, 2021, along with a simultaneous limited run at the El Capitan Theatre. The 2021 films The Boss Baby: Family Business and Halloween Kills, both distributed by Universal Pictures, received simultaneous releases in theaters and on Peacock. During the summer of that year, Paramount Pictures announced that it would release Paw Patrol: The Movie on Paramount+ on the same day as its theatrical release. The studio also decided to cancel the theatrical release of Rumble and instead released it on the streaming service on December 15, 2021.

Walt Disney Studios Motion Pictures released Encanto on Disney+ 30 days after an exclusive theatrical run. On January 7, 2022, it was announced that the Pixar film Turning Red would be skipping theaters entirely in the United States and Canada and would instead be released to Disney+ on March 11 along with one-week limited engagements at the El Capitan Theatre, AMC Empire 25, and Grand Lake Theatre, as well as several Showcase Cinema de Lux venues across the United Kingdom, amid the surge in COVID-19 cases fueled by the Omicron variant. (Note: Attributed to multiple references:) In the following months, Universal Pictures announced that four more of their films, Marry Me, Firestarter, Halloween Ends, and Honk for Jesus. Save Your Soul. would be released to Peacock on the same day as their theatrical releases. The last of the early home media releases was The Fabelmans on February 14, 2023. Two months later, however, Universal Pictures announced that Five Nights at Freddy's would receive a day-and-date release in theaters and on Peacock on October 27, 2023. In September 2023, Paramount cancelled the theatrical release of The Tiger's Apprentice and rescheduled it for a streaming release on Paramount+ for February 2024.

== Productions ==
During the start of the pandemic, film productions in the key outbreak zones (predominantly China, South Korea, and Italy) were forced their schedules, locations, or shut down completely. Sony Pictures closed its offices in London, Paris, and Poland after an employee was thought to have been exposed to the virus. The Writers Guild of America and SAG-AFTRA cancelled all in-person meetings. The Hengdian World Studios in Dongyang, China, closed indefinitely. The Philippine movie studios Star Cinema, Regal Entertainment, and Cinema One Originals also suspended shooting of their films, effective March 15, the same day as a quarantine in Metro Manila and Cainta, Rizal was enacted.

Several Chinese and Hong Kong films stopped production, including Blossoms which had been scheduled to shoot in Shanghai. Jia Zhangke was planning to begin filming a new film in China in April, but it was put on hold until the following spring. Polar Rescue, a Donnie Yen film, shut down production until the end of 2020.

One of the first big production shutdowns was that of Mission: Impossible – Dead Reckoning Part One, which was scheduled to begin filming in Venice, Italy when the crew was sent home and the sets left behind. After actor Tom Hanks became infected with the coronavirus, the Elvis Presley biopic he was working on in Queensland, Australia was shut down, with everyone on the production put into quarantine. Production company Warner Bros. began working with the Australian public health services to identify other people who may have been in contact with Hanks and his wife Rita Wilson, who had been performing at venues including the Sydney Opera House shortly before both were tested positive. The Marvel Studios film Shang-Chi and the Legend of the Ten Rings, which was also shooting in Australia, had its first unit production temporarily suspended on March 12, 2020, due to director Destin Daniel Cretton self-isolating while awaiting results for a coronavirus test, which came back negative.

The Association of Independent Commercial Producers (AICP) released a set of guidelines and work place practices in early-May 2020 as restrictions began to lift across the U.S. This set included specific guidelines for all departments and worksites involved in productions. An industry task force of studios and unions submitted a report on June 1, 2020, which included recommendations on health and safety guidelines for cast and crew of productions. These guidelines included regular testing, wearing face coverings at all times when not filming, actors practicing social distancing "whenever possible", reducing or modifying scenes involving "close contact", and recommending that casting be performed via videoconferencing or self-recorded video rather than in-person.

On June 5, 2020, Governor of California Gavin Newsom announced that film and television production could resume in the state beginning June 12, provided that conditions were favorable and approval was received from a county's public health officials. Newsom incorporated key guidelines from the task force's report. The next day, a group of unions (including the Directors Guild of America, the International Alliance of Theatrical Stage Employees, the International Brotherhood of Teamsters, and SAG-AFTRA) published a 36-page report detailing safety protocols agreed upon for union film and television productions, including regular testing of cast and crew members, closed sets, access zones, shooting limited to 10-hour sessions, and all productions requiring an on-set health safety supervisor.

On February 9, 2021, it was announced that Blue Sky Studios, a computer animation studio and subsidiary of 20th Century Animation which had been acquired by Disney during its purchase of 21st Century Fox, would be closed due to the economic impact of the pandemic on their business operations. The closure of Blue Sky also resulted in its cancellation of a film adaptation of Nimona, which was reported to be 75% complete.

== Exhibitors ==
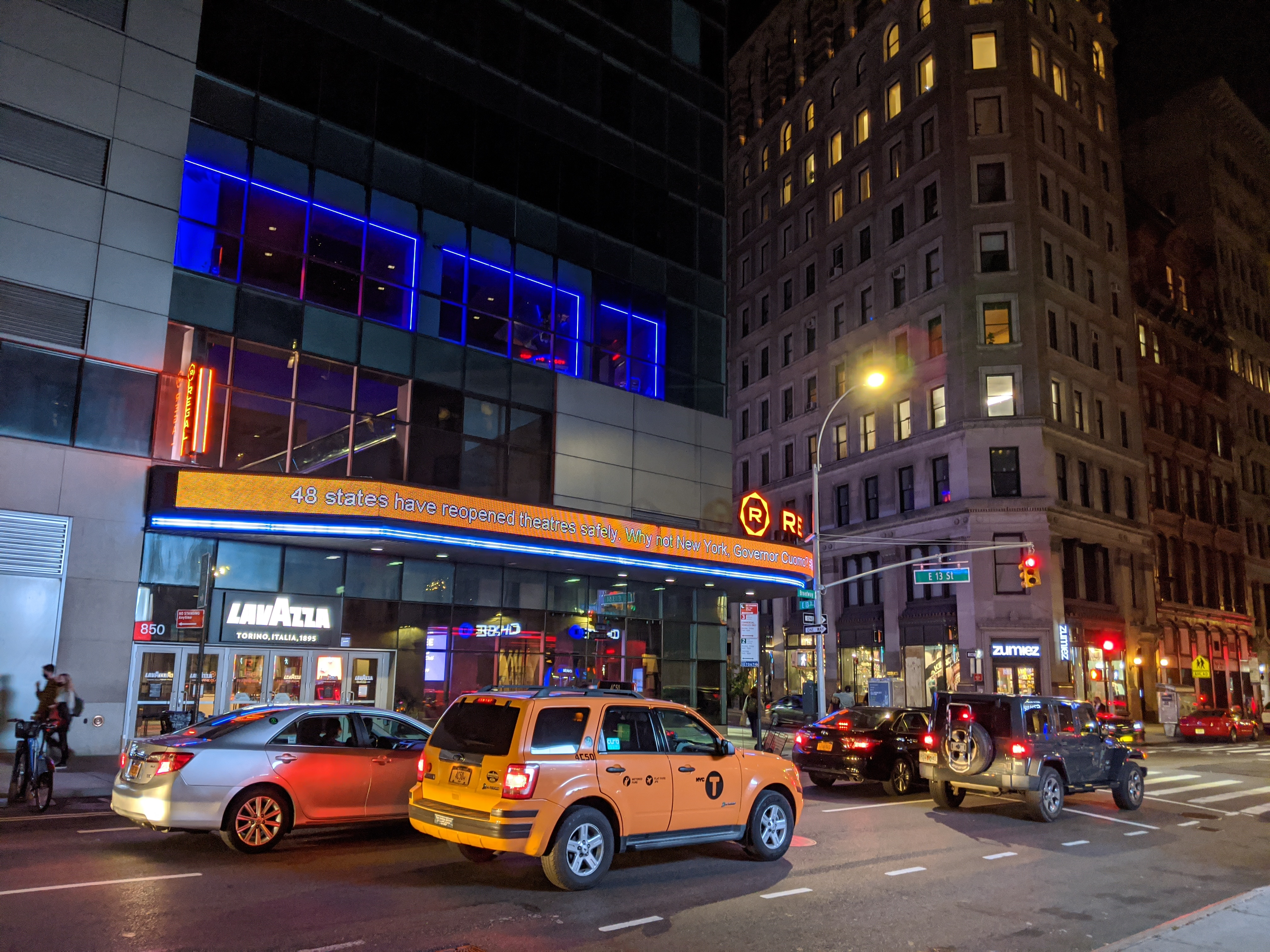
Regal Cinemas' Union Square location in October 2020, displaying a message on its marquee protesting continued closures of cinemas in the state of New York; "48 states have reopened theatres safely. Why not New York, Governor Cuomo?"

The publicly listed share prices of exhibitors, companies that own and finance showing films in cinemas and theaters, continued falling even as the global stock market rebounded. On March 4, 2020, Cinemark fell by 0.53% and AMC by 3.5%. That day, No Time to Die had its release postponed; by March 6, AMC's shares had fallen by 30% over two weeks. Between March 4 and 6, Cineworld's shares fell 20%, and fell another 24% on March 12. The falls were a result of AMC closing selected cinemas in Italy and the lack of confidence in the market created by No Time to Die moving its release date. The in-theater advertising company National CineMedia also reported stock falling, by 1.25% on March 4.

By March 12, Cinemark, AMC and National CineMedia stocks had all fallen by over 35% since the beginning of the month. Cineworld, the world's second-largest cinema chain, warned on March 12, when multiple films pushed back their releases, that extended disruption and continuing falling stock could cause the company to collapse.

In August 2020, California announced a new color-coded tier system that would allow restrictions to be lifted in specific counties based on health metrics, effective August 31. Cinemas would be allowed to operate at limited capacity if a county was in the red (""Substantial") tier or better. This scaled from at 25%/100 patrons (whichever is smaller) in red counties, to 50%/200 patrons in orange ("Moderate") counties, and 50% with no hard maximum in counties under the lowest yellow ("Minimal") tier. The majority of the state was still in the purple ("Widespread") tier at the onset of the system, where cinemas remained closed.

On October 3, after No Time to Die was delayed until April 2021, it was reported that Cineworld was considering suspending the operations of all of its cinemas in the UK and Ireland, and most US Regal Cinemas indefinitely, citing the lack of tentpole releases as impacting its business. The company confirmed the move on October 5, with CEO Mooky Greidinger stating that it was too expensive to continue operating its cinemas without a consistent lineup of new releases, and argued that the continued closure of cinemas in the state of New York has made studios reluctant to release films due to the underperformance of Tenet. The closures excluded seven Regal locations in California that had recently been allowed to reopen.

Although San Francisco County began to allow cinemas to reopen on October 7, the majority of cinemas remained closed due to a boycott by the National Association of Theatre Owners of California/Nevada, due to local guidelines prohibiting the sale of concessions. The group stated that this restriction "makes it economically impossible for our members to reopen and significantly limits the moviegoing experience for our audiences." Cinemark announced later that month that it planned to reopen selected cinemas in the Bay Area and Santa Clara County, operating in compliance with the concessions prohibition. On October 17, New York announced that it would allow cinemas outside New York City and situated in counties with a 14-day average of cases below 2% to reopen on October 23, at a maximum capacity of 50 patrons per-screen.

On November 9, 2020, Regal announced that the selected California and New York locations it had recently reopened would close indefinitely November 12. The same day, the share prices of AMC, Cinemark, and Disney rose on early reports by Pfizer on the efficacy of a COVID-19 vaccine in development by the company and BioNTech.

On March 5, 2021, cinemas in New York City were given authorization to reopen, subject to the same 50-patron limit as the remainder of the state. On March 11, after Los Angeles County moved from purple to red on the Blueprint for a Safer Economy, the Los Angeles County Department of Public Health (LACDPH) gave authorization for cinemas to resume operations in the area at 25% capacity. 42 of the approximately 107 cinemas (as of 2019) in the LA area had resumed operations by March 26, while other chains and independent cinemas reopened over the next few weeks for the release of Godzilla vs. Kong.

Two weeks later, movie theaters in Los Angeles began reopening with 25% capacity. On March 23, 2021, Regal Cinemas announced that they would reopen their cinemas beginning April 2, 2021. On April 19, it was announced that capacity for New York cinemas would be raised to 33% on April 26. The same day, California issued an addendum that orange-tier counties would be restricted to 50% with no hard cap on patrons, and that counties under the yellow ("Minimal") tier would be allowed to operate cinemas and other selected venues at up to 75% capacity if all attendees present proof of full vaccination or a recent negative COVID-19 test. Guidance was also issued for seating sections with less physical distancing for those who are fully vaccinated.

After filing for Chapter 11 bankruptcy protection in October 2020 and March 2021, respectively, Studio Movie Grill and Alamo Drafthouse Cinema respectively emerged from Chapter 11 in late-April 2021 and early-June 2021 with new funding, and some underperforming locations closed along with plans for new theaters being built. On April 21, 2021, The Decurion Corporation, the parent company of ArcLight Cinemas, the Cinerama Dome, and Pacific Theaters, announced they would be shutting down all of its locations, due to the financial impact of the pandemic. Two months later, Pacific Theaters filed for Chapter 7 bankruptcy. In the following months, the leases to many former Arclight Cinemas and Pacific Theaters locations were acquired by other movie theater chains such as Regal Cinemas, AMC Theatres, and Landmark Theatres. (Note: Attributed to multiple references:) In June 2022, it was announced that Decourion Corp. had plans to reopen the Cinerama Dome and former 14-screen Arclight Hollywood cinema. In September of that year, it was reported that the locations would not be reopening until at least the latter part of 2023. During that month, Cineworld filed for Chapter 11 Bankruptcy and closed 12 U.S. cinemas. In January 2023, Regal Cinemas announced that 39 more of their locations would be closing unless the leases were renegotiated. The following week, Cineworld announced it was pursuing a sale of its company and all of its assets to 30 potential buyers. In February 2023, the company announced that it had received around 40 non-binding bids from potential buyers for non-U.S. assets. In May 2023, Cineworld said that it expected to emerge from Chapter 11 bankruptcy in July of that year, which it eventually did. During the same month, it was reported that the reopening of the Cinerama Dome and former 14-screen Arclight Hollywood cinema had been delayed until 2024. Later that year, it was then reported that the cinema's reopening had been delayed until the second quarter of 2025 due largely to the redesign happening in the space including the addition of restaurants and event space. The following year, however, a report from Variety said that the reopening of the Cinema was uncertain due to the property manager saying it would not reopen that year and that Decurion was unwilling to either sell or reopen the complex. A petition to reopen the Arclight Hollywood and Cinerama Dome had reached more than 30,000 signatures by April 2025. Two months later, Elizabeth Peterson of the Elizabeth Peterson Group said during a public hearing held by the Los Angeles Office of Zoning Administration that the Dome Center for LLC Robinson Property Group reached out to her about wanting to restore the Arclight Hollywood and Cinereama Dome. In August 2025, a report stated that the fate of the Cinerama Dome and ArcLight Hollywood remained in limbo. In June 2024, six Alamo Drafthouse Cinema locations were forced to close after enduring shutdowns during the COVID-19 pandemic in addition to the impacts of the 2023 Hollywood labor disputes. During that month, the chain was purchased by Sony Pictures. In addition, the six locations that closed in Texas and Minnesota were announced to reopen later that summer. In July 2026, Sony Pictures announced its purchases of the leases to both the Cinerama Dome and Hollywood Arclight multiplex with the latter becoming an Alamo Drafthouse Cinema and plans to reopen both locations in 2028.

On May 3, 2021, the governors of Connecticut, New Jersey, and New York jointly announced that they planned to lift most capacity restrictions on businesses on May 19. For cinemas in New York, they would not be limited in how many patrons may be present but were subject to maintaining 6 feet (1.8 m) social distancing between groups. On May 4, Los Angeles County was moved to yellow ("Minimal") tier by state health officials, but the LACDPH did not allow cinemas to use the 75% option. Due to progress on vaccination, New York and California lifted capacity restrictions, including those on cinemas, in June 2021.

By August 2021, due to spread of Delta variant and waning vaccination rates nationwide, New York City (where only 55% of residents were fully-vaccinated) announced on August 3 that effective September 13, access to indoor entertainment venues (including cinemas) would be restricted to those who were vaccinated. In October 2021, Los Angeles announced that starting November 4 residents would be required to show proof of a COVID-19 vaccination to enter movie theaters.

In March 2022, India's two largest cinema chains PVR Cinemas and INOX Leisure agreed to merge following the impact of COVID-19 on the country's cinemas.

== Streaming services ==
At the onset of the pandemic, the BBC noted that the popularity of streaming services could increase, especially if more people were isolated at home, with The Guardian suggesting that non-blockbuster films may be sent to streaming more quickly than anticipated after release to capitalize on this market. The 2011 film Contagion moved up from being the 270th most-watched Warner Bros. film in December 2019 to become its 2nd most-watched film in 2020 (by March) and entered the top 10 on iTunes film rentals, ostensibly due to the similarities its story bears to the outbreak. The stock of Netflix increased in 2020 by March 12. The platform had released its original docuseries Pandemic: How to Prevent an Outbreak at the end of January 2020. Disney+ went live in India on March 11 via its domestic service Hotstar, eighteen days before it was set to, though Disney's shares had fallen by 23% on March 9. The number of streaming service subscriptions passed 1 billion worldwide for the first time in 2020, largely due to the pandemic. Meanwhile, global box office sales experienced a stunning downturn, dropping 72%.

== Insurance ==
In various trade publications and media outlets, insurance brokers from Front Row Insurance Brokers Inc. provided commentary on the impact of the COVID-19 pandemic on cinema, and specifically on film production insurance. COVID-19 made film production insurance more difficult to obtain for many productions. Many insurance companies added "communicable disease exclusions" to these policies, meaning that the film insurance would not cover losses caused by COVID-19. The only film insurance solutions offering COVID-19 coverage came with very high premiums; much higher than productions were used to paying (pre-COVID).

== See also ==
- List of films impacted by the COVID-19 pandemic
- Chinese New Year film – a type of family film designed to be a blockbuster in Asia over the Chinese New Year
- Corona, Coronavirus, Corona Zombies and Songbird, four major feature films about the pandemic
- Impact of the COVID-19 pandemic on television
- Impact of the COVID-19 pandemic on the arts and cultural heritage
- Social impact of the COVID-19 pandemic
