= Santa Monica Mall =

Santa Monica Mall may mean;

- Third Street Promenade, a downtown pedestrian mall, in Santa Monica, California, built in 1965, whose original name was Santa Monica Mall
- Santa Monica Place, an outdoor shopping mall in Santa Monica, California, adjacent to Third Street Promenade
