= Decurion =

Decurion may refer to:

- Decurion (Roman cavalry officer), a Roman cavalry officer in command of a squadron
- Decurion (administrative), a member of a city or town council in ancient Rome
- The Decurion Corporation, American corporation
