= Les Lalanne =

French artist duo

Les Lalanne (sometimes translated as "The Lalannes" in English) is the term for the French artist team of François-Xavier Lalanne (1927–2008) and Claude Lalanne (1925–2019).

== Careers ==
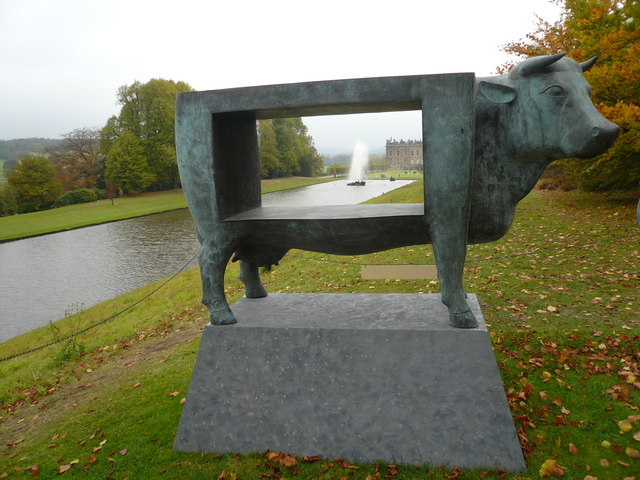
Chatsworth Gardens - geograph.org.uk - 597020

Francois-Xavier Lalanne was born in Agen, France, and received a Jesuit education. At age 18, he moved to Paris and studied sculpture, drawing and painting at Académie Julian. In 1948 Lalanne worked as an attendant at the Louvre in the Oriental Antiques section. Francois-Xavier rented a studio in Montparnasse, next door to friend Constantin Brâncuși, after completing mandatory military service. Brâncuși introduced Lalanne to artists such as Max Ernst, Man Ray, Marcel Duchamp, and Jean Tinguely. He met Claude Lalanne at his first gallery show in 1952. The show signified an end of painting for François-Xavier as he and his wife Claude began their career sculpting together. Claude Lalanne became known to the larger public in France in 1976 when the singer Serge Gainsbourg selected one of her works, "The man with the head of a cabbage", for the title and cover of an album of his.

Claude Lalanne was born in Paris and studied architecture at the École des Beaux-Arts and at the École des Arts Décoratifs. She involved herself in the artist community in Impasse Ronsin, Montparnasse. She became friends with American artists Larry Rivers and Jimmy Metcalf who helped her develop the art of electroplating. Since 1988, Les Lalannes worked closely with Jean-Gabriel Mitterrand who has represented them in the Mitterrand Galerie in Paris. Les Lalanne were represented by the Paul Kasmin Gallery in New York City and Ben Brown Fine Arts in London.

In 1983 Les Lalanne was commissioned by the French Ministry of Culture to design new monumental fountains for the square in front of the Hôtel de Ville, and also to design gardens for the reconstructed Les Halles in the center of Paris.

== Artworks and exhibitions ==
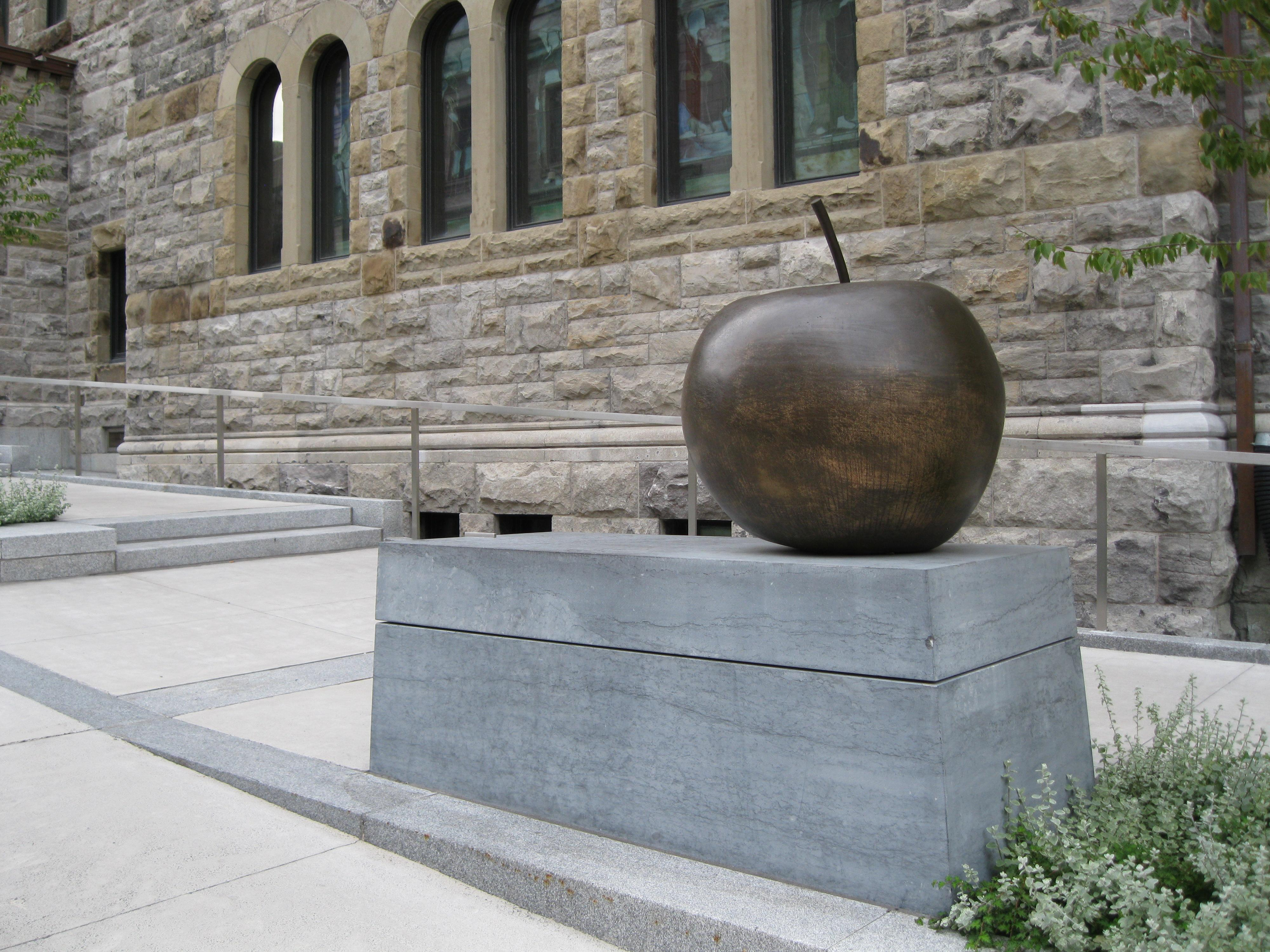
Pomme de Londres (2007)

The themes explored by the two collectively went against the current trend of Abstract art in the 1960s. The couple believed and Francois-Xavier claimed, "the supreme art is the art of living". The couple began attracting public attention in Paris during the 1960s when Yves Saint Laurent and Pierre Bergé commissioned them. In particular, Francois-Xavier's realistic bronze cast sheep covered in skin alongside lily vanes cast by Claude were displayed in the library of Yves Saint Laurent and Pierre Bergé. Their first exhibition together included Francois-Xavier's famous rhinoceros desk, Rhinocrétaire, and Claude's cabbage with chicken legs sculpture. Similar themes by Les Lalanne have classified their works as an ode to Surrealism and Art Nouveau.

Claude and François-Xavier Lalanne were known to co-create on projects rather than collaborate. While François-Xavier favored sculpting animal themes, Claude preferred vegetation. These themes are paired in their 1989 public art installation of topiary fountains for the City of Santa Monica's Third Street Promenade entitled The Dinosaurs of Santa Monica, where six 15-foot (4.6 m) tall topiary dinosaurs spew jets of water.

In the 21st century, the works of Les Lalanne have been exhibited in different venues in New York City. In 2009, the artist duo participated in "Park Avenue Recession Art", an effort developed by the Paul Kasmin Gallery, the New York City Parks Department’s public-art division, and the Fund for Park Avenue Sculpture Committee. The project comprised a series of sculptures in between crosswalks on Park Avenue. The featured pieces were a bronze apple called Pomme de New York on 52nd Street, Moutons on 53rd Street, Choupatte (Très Grand) on 56th Street, and Singe Avisé (Très Grand) on 58th Street, which was François-Xavier's last sculpture.

In late 2013, Mr. Lalanne's sheep were the inaugural public installation of Getty Station, a former gas service station conceived by real estate developer and art collector Michael Shvo in Manhattan's Chelsea district, to much fanfare.

In 2021, the Clark Art Institute exhibited Claude & François-Xavier Lalanne: Nature Transformed. The exhibit examined “the ways both artists transformed nature through surreal combinations of flora and fauna, shifts of scale, and flights of fancy, creating hybrid objects that are at once sculptural and, often, functional.”

== Selected press ==
- Ho, Karen K., “First-Ever Exhibition Pairing René Magritte and Les Lalannes Will Open in New York in October”, ArtNews, 7/30/25.
- Kinsella, Eileen, "Sotheby's Boosts Private S|2 Sales With London Hires, NYC Lalanne Show", Artinfo, 10/7/13.
- Gross, Michael Joseph, "Grass Station", The New Yorker, 9/24/13.
- Cochran, Samuel, "François-Xavier Lalanne's Mouton Sculptures Go On View at 'Sheep Station'", Architectural Digest, 9/18/13.
- Grey, Tobias, "Next to Nature, Art", The Wall Street Journal, 6/20/13.
