= ROMA Design Group =

Firm based in San Francisco, California, US

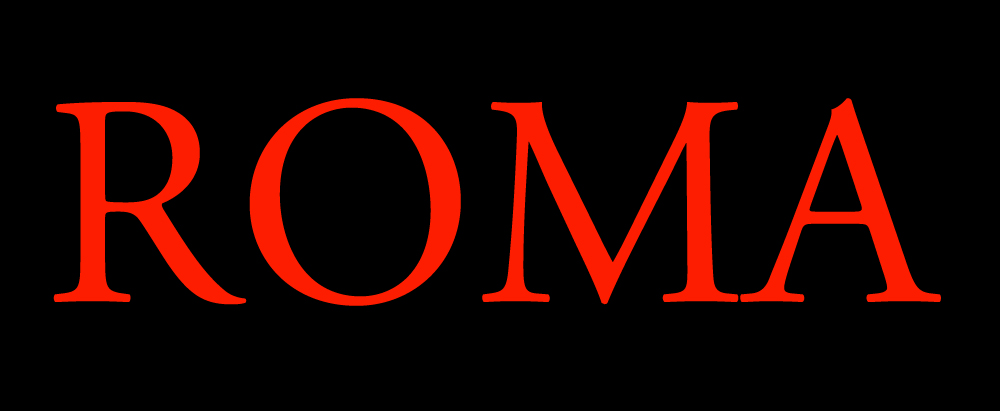

Practice information
- Key architects: Boris Dramov, FAIA, FAICP, President; Bonnie Fisher, FASLA, LEED AP; Principals: Marian Sam, CFO; Ivana Micic, AIA
- Founded: 1949
- Location: San Francisco, California

Significant works and honors
- Buildings: Santa Monica Third Street Promenade; San Francisco Waterfront Piers, Promenades, and Public Space Design; Mid Embarcadero Transportation and Open Space; Martin Luther King Jr. Memorial
- Awards: Partners for Livable Communities Investors in America Award; Ferry Building Plaza, National AIA Urban Design Award of Excellence

ROMA Design Group is an interdisciplinary firm of architects, landscape architects, and urban planners based in San Francisco, California, United States. It was founded in 1968 by American architect George T. Rockrise.

== History ==
ROMA Design Group was founded in late 1968 by George T. Rockrise, FAIA, ASLA, AICP. Rockrise was an architect with a strong interest in landscape and site design. He began his career in Panama during World War II, and then returned to New York City, working for Edward D. Stone and Skidmore, Owings, and Merrill (United Nations). Rockrise then worked in California, for the landscape architect Thomas Dolliver Church.

In 1950 he established his own practice in San Francisco; George T. Rockrise, A.I.A. In 1968 Rockrise formed George T. Rockrise and Associates with Robert A. Odermatt, Robert C. Mountjoy, and James J. Amis becoming principals. The firm later became Rockrise, Odermatt, Mountjoy, and Amis, and ultimately ROMA Design Group, as it is known today.

In the 1980s Boris Dramov, Bonnie Fisher, and Jim Adams became Principals, having met at the Harvard Graduate School of Design. Jim Adams later went on to open ROMA's offices in Austin, Texas.

In 2000, ROMA's design for the Martin Luther King Jr. Memorial in Washington, D.C. was selected as the winning submission in an international architectural design competition.

The firm is currently under the leadership of Boris Dramov, FAIA, FAICP, Design Principal and Bonnie Fisher, FASLA, Landscape Principal.

== Notable projects ==
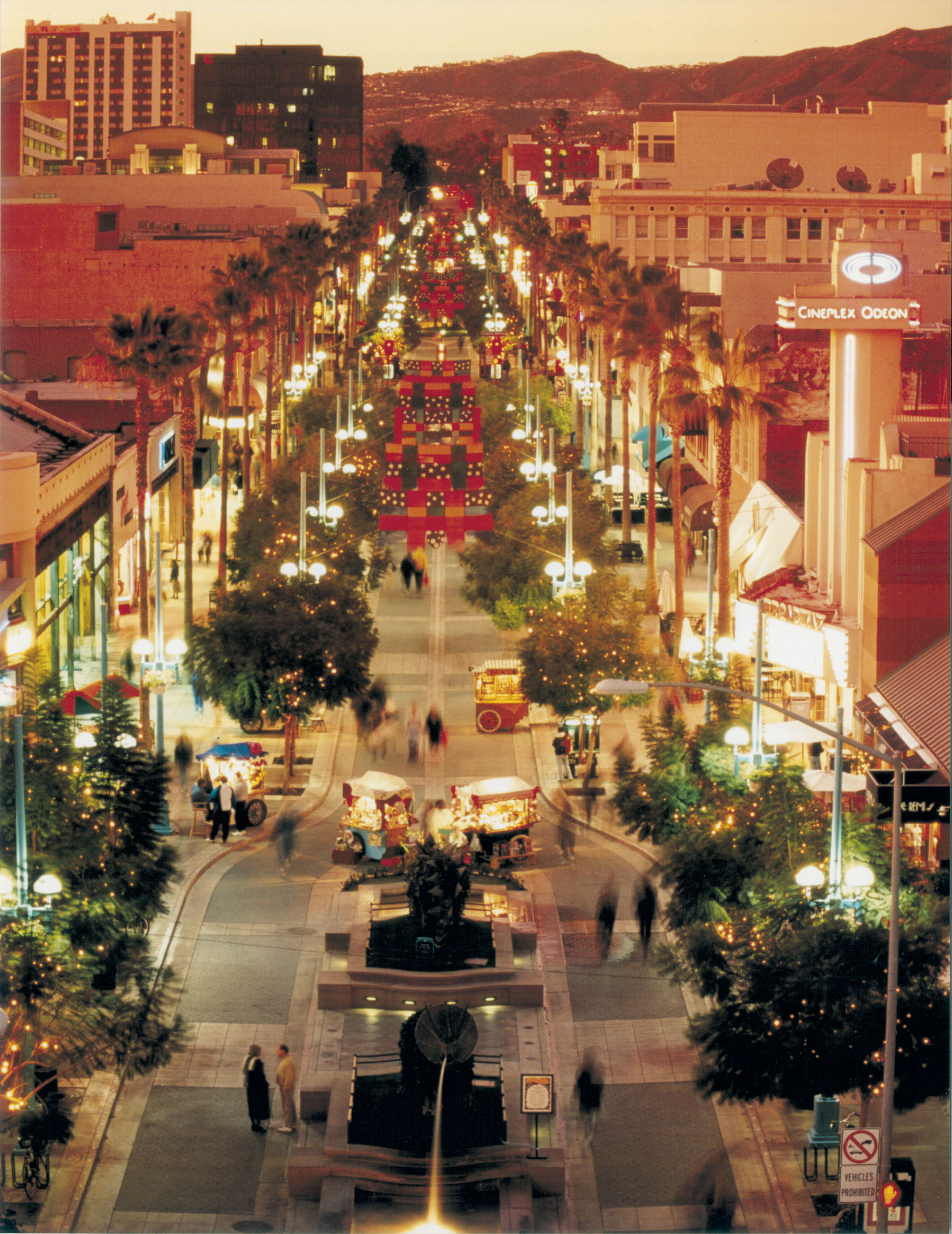
Third Street Promenade, Santa Monica

Since the 1950s ROMA Design Group has become known for a wide variety of architecture projects, including San Francisco's Cathedral School, the Bahrain's U.S. Embassy in Manama, the Domaine Chandon Winery in Yountville, California, Oregon's Sun River Resort, and the Inn at the Tides in Bodega Bay, California.

ROMA Design Group has become known for revitalizing declining urban districts of at least 25 cities, for example Suisun City, California. In particular the firm has long been associated with the transformation of the San Francisco waterfront after the demolition of the Embarcadero Freeway, ROMA's new Ferry Terminal was welcomed by the Baycrossing Magazine, saying the terminal created new hope for the city. According to Boris Dramov, "The effect is intended to speak to the role this space has as a gathering place, counter-pointing the modern and the traditional. You see it with the granite portals through which passengers pass to enter the floats. The stainless steel on floats’ canopies recalls the new trolley stops." In 2006 ROMA's 637-foot long Pier 14 was completed, which the San Francisco Chronicle described as "compelling". It designed Santa Monica's Third Street Promenade and other projects in the Santa Monica downtown and Civic Center.

=== International ===
- Viaduct Harbour Plan, America’s Cup, Auckland, New Zealand (1997)
- Makati Pedestrianization Project, Makati, Manila, Philippines (1998)
- Greenbelt Master Plan, Makati, Manila, Philippines (2003)
- Zhanggui Zhang New Town Master Plan, Tianjin, China (2003)
- Zhanggui Zhang Town Center Plan, Tianjin, China (2003)
- Bonifacio Global City Master Plan, Manila, Philippines (2006)
- Konstantinovo New Town Community, Moscow, Russia (2008)
- Konstantinovo West Village Urban Design Plan, Moscow, Russia (2009)
- Orchard Road Concept Plan, Singapore (2010)
- Bomonti Hotel Conference Center/Residential Complex, Istanbul, Turkey (2012)
- Altinyildiz Mixed Use Project, Istanbul, Turkey (2012)
- Concept Plan for Hotel/Conference Center, Tashkent, Uzbekistan (2012)
- Mountain Resort/Hotel Complex, Shahdag, Azerbaijan (2012)
- Visioning for Heydar Aliyev International Airport, Baku, Azerbaijan (2012)

== Awards ==
- Partners for Livable Communities Investors in America Award: A Celebration of Vision & Community Spirit
- ABAG Urban Design Award, City Station District Pedestrian Open Space, Union City, California.
- Ferry Building Plaza, National AIA Urban Design Award of Excellence
- Outstanding Brownfield Redevelopment Award: Phoenix Awards, 2003. South Downtown Redevelopment Project, Portland.
- Award of Excellence: Congress for the New Urbanism, 2001. Robert Mueller Municipal Airport Redevelopment and Reuse Plan.
- Design Competition Winning Submission. Martin Luther King Jr. National Memorial Foundation Inc., 2000. Martin Luther King Jr. Memorial, Washington, D.C.
- Honor Award: Urban Design Category, National American Institute of Architects, 2000. Mid-Embarcadero Open Space/Transportation project.
- Honor Award: Mixed-Use Category, The Waterfront Center, 1999. Suisun City Waterfront Project.
- Merit Award: Planning and Urban Design Category, American Society of Landscape Architects, National Chapter, 1995. Civic Center Specific Plan, Santa Monica.
- Ahwahnee Community Design Award, Local Government Commission, 1995. Civic Center Specific Plan, Santa Monica, California.
- Ahwahnee Community Design Award, Local Government Commission, 1995. Suisun City Redevelopment Plan, Suisun, California.
- Ahwahnee Community Design Award, Local Government Commission, 1995. Community Design Principals, Chico, California.
- Ahwahnee Community Design Award, Local Government Commission, 1994. Downtown Recovery Plan, Santa Cruz, California.
- Honor Award: Design Category, National Chapter of the American Society of Landscape Architects, 1993, Pier 7, San Francisco, California.
- Merit Award: Design Category, National Chapter of the American Society of Landscape Architects, 1993. Third Street Promenade, Santa Monica, California.
- Outstanding Planning Award, American Planning Association, Sacramento Chapter, 1993. Capitol View Protection Plan, Sacramento, California.
- Grand Award: Best Community Site Plan, Under 100 Acres. Pacific Coast Builders Conference, 1993. Navy Broadway Complex, San Diego, California.
- Urban Design Award of Excellence, National Chapter American Institute of Architects, 1992. Railyards Specific Plan, Sacramento, California.
- Urban Design Award of Excellence, National Chapter American Institute of Architects, 1992. Third Street Promenade, Santa Monica, California.
