= Clifford Nolan Bailey =

American fine artist and painter

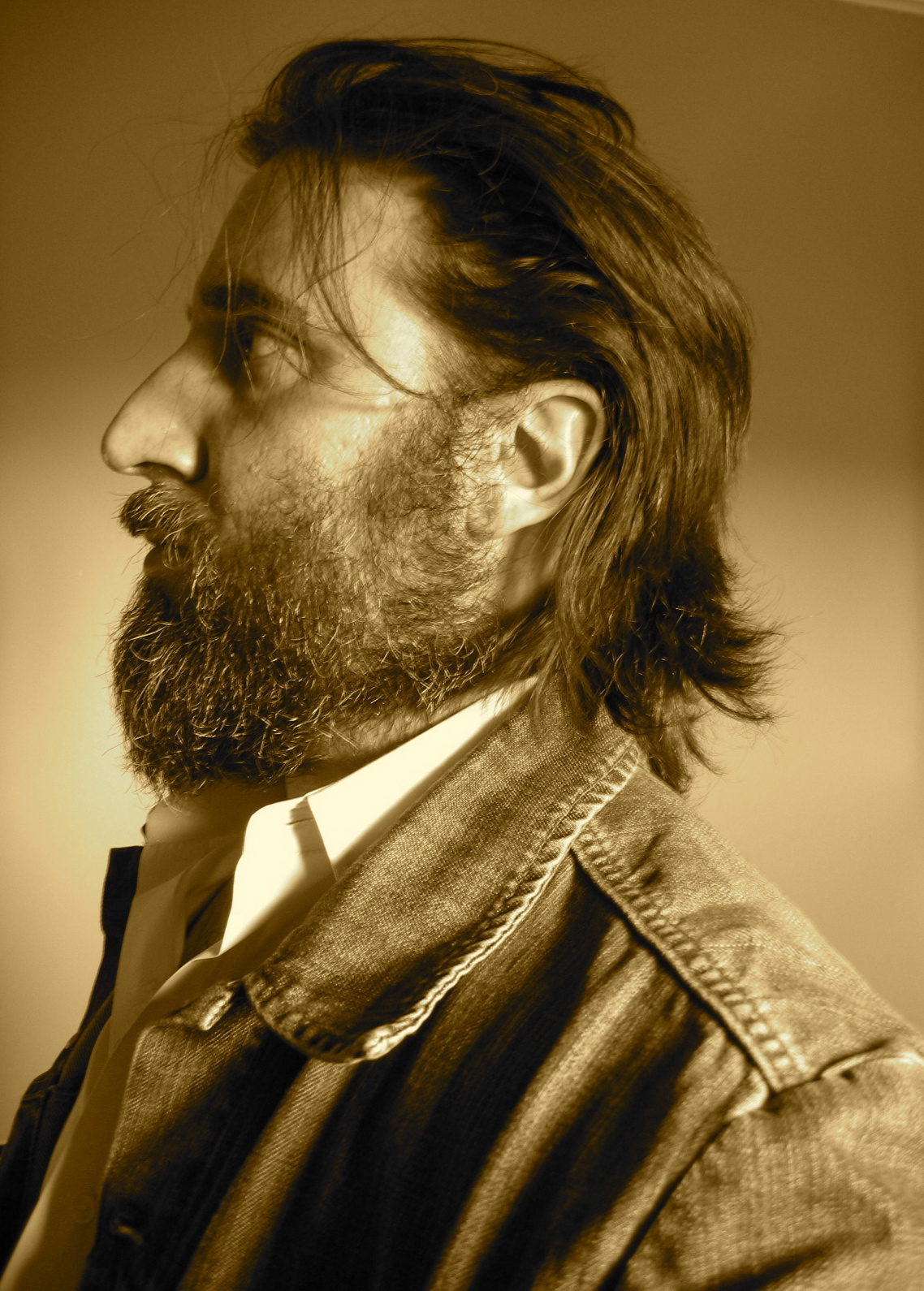
- Born: 1969 (age 56–57); Miami
- Education: School of Visual Arts,
- Occupations: Fine artist & Painter
- Website: cliffordbailey.com

Clifford Nolan Bailey (born 1969) is an American fine artist and painter.

== Career ==
Born in Miami in 1969, Bailey holds a Bachelor of Fine Arts degree from School of Visual Arts, New York (1991).

As a traveling artist, Bailey is known for staging regular exhibitions of his paintings in nightclubs, galleries, boutiques and private homes.

In 1994, Bailey painted Voodoo Lounge live in front of The Rolling Stones on Thanksgiving for their Thanksgiving Pay per view event featuring Sheryl Crow, Robert Cray, Bo Diddley.

In 1997, Clifford painted The Wallflowers and they used the painting as cover art for their CD single Three Marlenas.

In 2012, Bailey was among the featured artists at the Napa Valley Film Festival. Notable among his collectors include Howard Fishman, Dave Barry, Phil Collins, Rita Coolidge, John Mayer, Aubrey Plaza and others

Bailey's works are featured and commissioned in restaurants and hotels across the United States.

== See also ==
- Tarsem Singh
- Rita Coolidge
- Device – Voice – Drum
- ArcLight Cinemas
