= Third Street Promenade =

Pedestrian mall shopping complex

Coordinates: 34.0156°N 118.4961°W

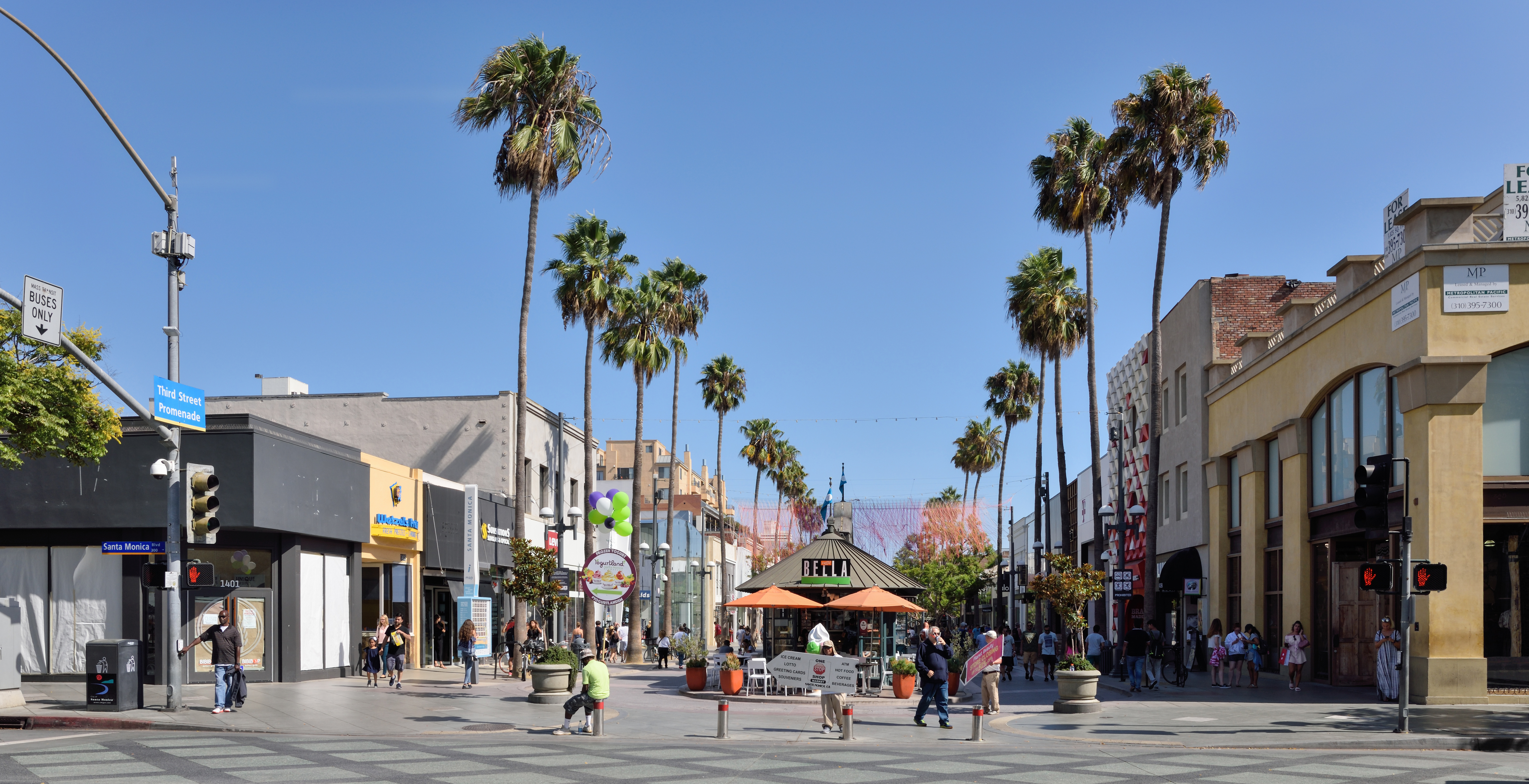
- A picture taken in the heart of the Promenade in 2017
- Location: Santa Monica, California, U.S.
- Opened: November 8, 1965; 60 years ago
- Developer: The Hahn Company and The Rouse Company
- Manager: Downtown Santa Monica, Inc.
- Owner: Multiple owners, including Federal Realty Investment Trust, and KLM Equities
- Parking: Structured
- Public transit: Downtown Santa Monica
- Website: Third Street Promenade and Downtown Santa Monica

The Third Street Promenade is a pedestrian mall esplanade, shopping, dining and entertainment complex in the downtown area of Santa Monica, California which originally opened as the Santa Monica Mall on November 8, 1965. It is considered a premier shopping and dining district on the Westside and draws crowds from all over the Greater Los Angeles area. Due to easy access to Downtown Los Angeles via the Big Blue Bus rapid transit service, E Line's terminus station and the Pacific Coast Highway-Santa Monica Freeway Interstate, the neighborhood's north-south thoroughfares connecting to Muscle Beach, Venice Canal Historic District, Marina del Rey, Ballona Wetlands and Los Angeles International Airport, and its proximity to historic U.S. Route 66, Santa Monica Pier, Palisades Park, Tongva Park, Santa Monica State Beach and the Pacific Ocean coupled with Los Angeles's mild mediterranean climate, it is also a popular tourist destination.

== History ==
Third Street has been a center of business in Santa Monica since the town's inception in the late 19th century. The Promenade's roots date back to November 8, 1965, when three blocks of Third Street were converted into a pedestrian mall. Although successful, by the late 1970s, the Santa Monica Mall (as it was then called), was in need of modernization and a redesign. A new enclosed shopping center, Santa Monica Place (1980–2007), designed by Frank Gehry was added at the Promenade's southern end. A citywide bond measure was issued and architectural firm ROMA Design Group was hired to redesign Santa Monica Mall. The renamed Third Street Promenade opened on September 16, 1989. The project was part of a larger redevelopment effort, encompassing several blocks of Downtown Santa Monica. Santa Monica Place has since been renovated into a new open-air shopping and dining venue, designed by Jon Jerde, that re-opened on August 6, 2010.

The Third Street Promenade and Downtown Santa Monica are overseen by Downtown Santa Monica, Inc. (formerly Bayside District Corporation), a private non-profit 501(c)(3) that works with the City of Santa Monica to manage services and operations in Downtown Santa Monica that promote economic stability, growth and community life within Downtown Santa Monica.

== Features ==
=== Public art ===
A central feature of the Third Street Promenade are the public art topiary sculptures and fountains The Dinosaurs of Santa Monica by the French team Les Lalanne. Located along three blocks of the Third Street Promenade, the dinosaur topiaries "spew" streams of water from their mouths.

Surrounding the Third Street Promenade are several multi-level parking structures developed in tandem with the Promenade's 1989 renovation. These parking structures contain exterior building-mounted sculptures, exterior building-mounted murals, and interior murals by artists such as Gilbert Lujan, Art Mortimer, Peter Shire, Cliff Garden, Ball-Nogues Studio, and Anne Marie Karlsen,

=== Entertainment ===
Community sentiment and feedback during the 1989 planning phase expressed strong desire for public gathering space and "outdoor living room" space. The redevelopment plans took this to heart and designed the public space for public life, shopping and entertainment. Street performers and entertainers are a frequent sight on the street. On a typical Saturday night in the summer, singer-songwriters, classical guitar players, magicians, clowns, hip-hop dancers, lounge singers, session drummers, and other artists line up approximately 40 feet (12 m) to 50 feet (15 m) apart from each other all along Third Street.

The Third Street Promenade in Santa Monica is well-known for its renowned shops, such as Patagonia, Lululemon, Anthropologie, and Urban Outfitters. In addition, the promenade has several high-end designer outlet stores, including Coach, Kate Spade, Rolex, and Tiffany & Co. Beyond shopping, the Third Street Promenade is also a cultural landmark. Its setting has been the backdrop for many iconic films, including Heat, Pee-wee's Big Adventure, Pretty in Pink, Twins, and Freaky Friday. It has also appeared in popular television series such as Curb Your Enthusiasm and Buffy the Vampire Slayer, further cementing its place in entertainment history.

== Photo gallery ==
Trees along Third Street lit up for the Holidays.

Broadway Theatre on Third Street.

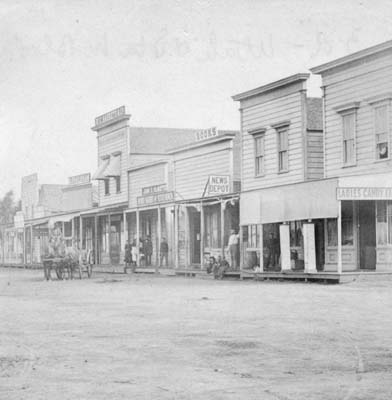
Businesses on Third Street, between Utah and Oregon (now Santa Monica Blvd.), 1880.
