= Santa Monica Place =

Shopping center in California, U.S.

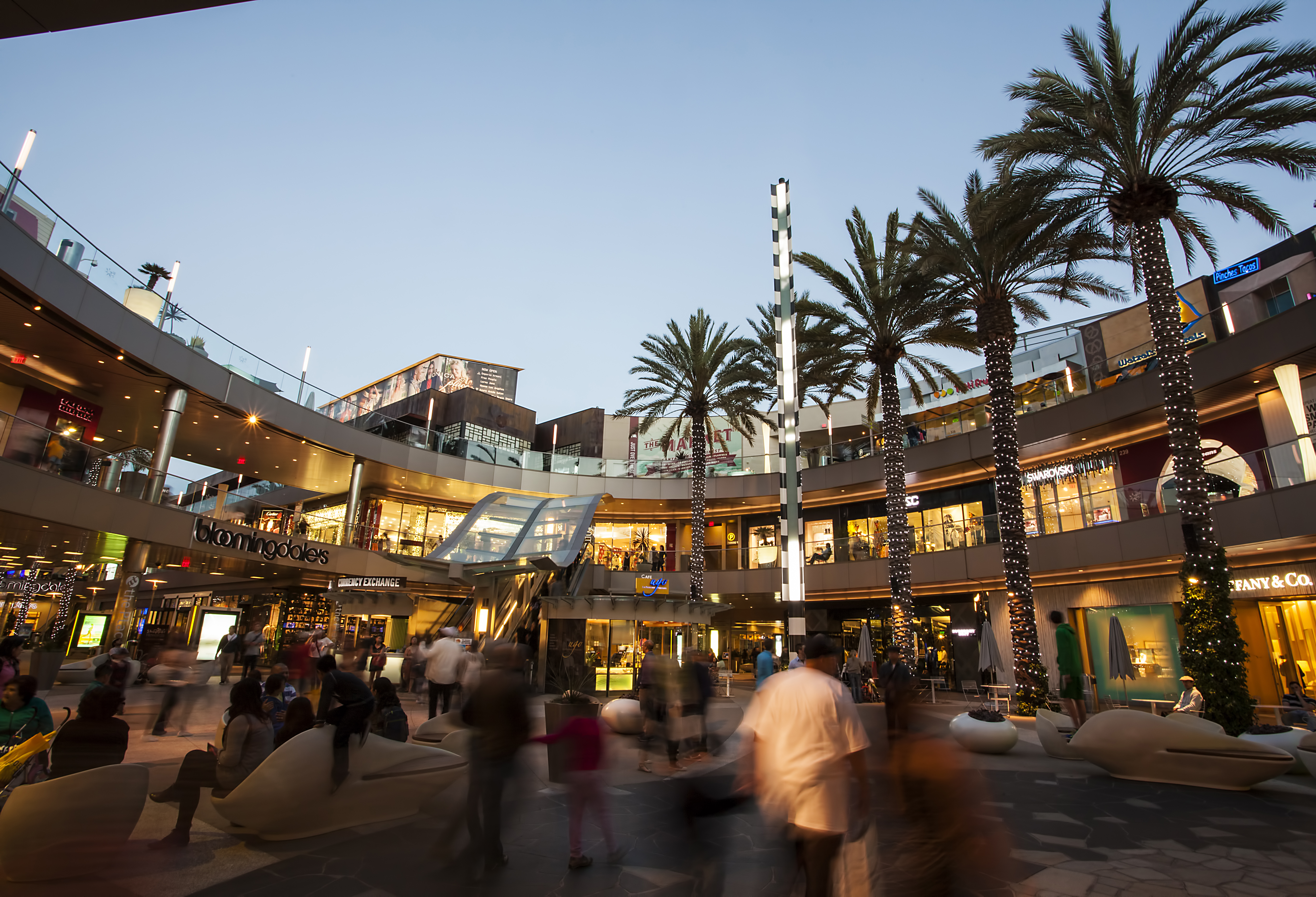
- At sunset (March 2013)
- Location: Santa Monica, California, U.S.
- Coordinates: 34.013621°N 118.493726°W
- Opened: 1980; 46 years ago (as original indoor mall); August 6, 2010; 16 years ago (as current outdoor mall)
- Closed: January 2008; 18 years ago (as original indoor mall)
- Developer: The Rouse Company; The Hahn Company
- Manager: Prism Places
- Owner: Prism Places
- Architect: Frank Gehry (1980); Jon Jerde (2010)
- Floor area: 475,000 sq ft (44,100 m^{2})
- Floors: 3
- Parking: Structured
- Website: santamonicaplace.com

Santa Monica Place is an outdoor shopping mall in Santa Monica, California. The mall is located at the south end of Santa Monica's Third Street Promenade shopping district, two blocks from the beach and Santa Monica Pier. The mall originally opened in 1980 as an indoor mall, and underwent a massive, three-year reconstruction process beginning in January 2008 and re-opened as an outdoor shopping mall on August 6, 2010. The mall spans three levels. The mall has two vacant anchor stores, formerly occupied by Bloomingdale's and Nordstrom. The mall's tenant mix is predominantly upscale, featuring Elie Tahari, and AllSaints.

== History ==
Santa Monica Place originally opened as an indoor mall in 1980 at the apex of Santa Monica's Third Street Promenade, developed jointly by The Rouse Company and The Hahn Company through subsidiary Santa Monica Place, Inc. Originally anchored by J. W. Robinson's and The Broadway, it featured 120 shops, restaurants and a food court, spanning three levels. The mall was meant to inject vitality into the then-struggling Third Street Promenade but it only took away more customers from the street.

Santa Monica Place was one of the first works of architect Frank Gehry, and it was his first shopping mall, after he lost a bid to design The Mall in Columbia in Columbia, Maryland, early in his professional career with Gruen Associates. In the 1990s, both anchor stores changed names. In 1993, the Robinson's store rebranded as Robinsons-May while The Broadway store rebranded as Macy's in 1996.

Macerich purchased Santa Monica Place from Rouse in 1999, and rumors of major changes to the then-flailing shopping center were reported. In 2004, the company proposed tearing down the mall and replacing it with a 10-acre (40,000 m^{2}) complex of high-rise condos, shops and offices. The plan met with strong opposition from local residents who felt the project did not meet the low-rise character of the neighborhood and would worsen traffic. In 2006, Robinsons-May closed as a result of Federated buying out May Department Stores in 2005. The store was replaced by Steve & Barry's in 2007. In a second 2007 proposal, Macerich significantly scaled back its plans, which was received as positive by the public, and was passed.

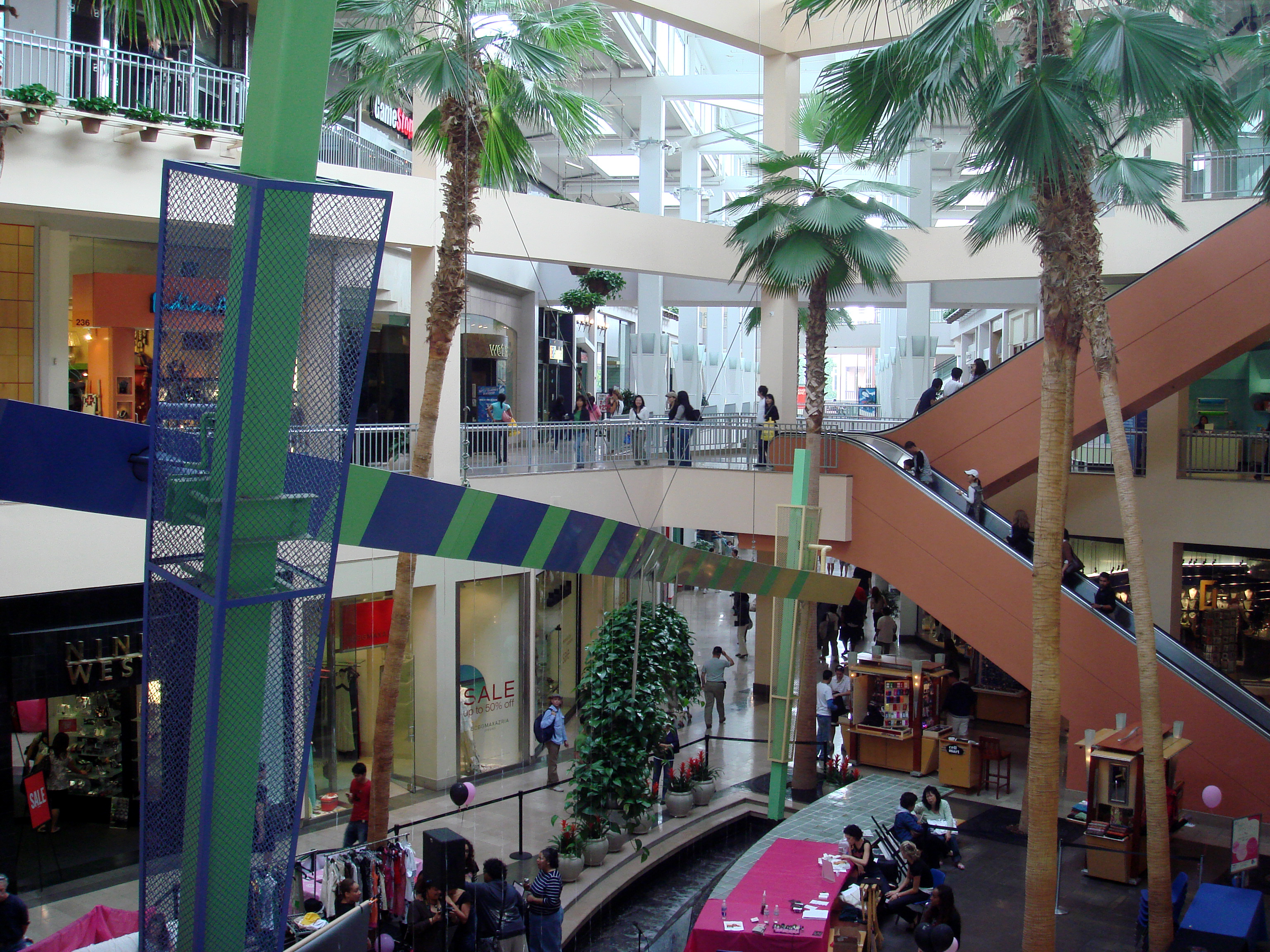
The original indoor mall designed by Frank Gehry.

The $265 million project removed the mall's roof and gutted the interior, replacing it with two levels of retail shops and a third-level food court. At the same time, Kevin Kennon Architects converted the original Macy's into a Bloomingdale's while the Steve & Barry's was replaced with a Nordstrom. Dallas-based Omniplan served as the executive architects in association with The Jerde Partnership who served as the design architects. The architect for the redesign was Jon Jerde. It was his last major work before his death in 2015. The mall reopened on August 6, 2010.

On November 15, 2015 an Arclight Cinemas multiplex opened in a new structure atop the Bloomingdale's anchor store.

On January 6, 2021, Bloomingdale's announced that they would close their anchor store. Its final day of operation was March 28, 2021. On April 12, 2021, ArcLight Cinemas, located atop the Bloomingdale's anchor store, and temporarily shuttered since March 17, 2020 due to the ongoing COVID-19 pandemic, had its lease terminated for non-payment of rent. In 2023, it was announced that the structure containing Bloomingdale's and the ArcLight Cinemas would be renovated as a 48,000-square-foot flagship outpost for Arte Museum, an immersive digital media destination planned and produced by D'strict, a digital design company based in Seoul, South Korea. Macerich, the mall development corporation, announced that the remaining space in the structure would possibly house a high-end fitness facility. It's the only ArcLight location to not reopen as a movie theater. On April 3, 2025, Prism Places acquired the mall from Macerich. Nordstrom closed after 15 years on August 26, 2025, leaving no remaining anchor stores at the mall.

== Public transit access ==
The Los Angeles Metro Rail E Line's Downtown Santa Monica station is located across the street from the former Bloomingdale's. In addition, many Santa Monica Big Blue Bus routes serve the mall.
