= Pacific Theatres =

Movie theater chain

Coordinates: 33.8472°N 118.1363°W

- Type: Subsidiary
- Industry: Entertainment
- Founded: 1946
- Defunct: 2021
- Fate: Chapter 7 bankruptcy liquidation
- Headquarters: Los Angeles, California, U.S.
- Products: Motion pictures, movie theaters
- Owner: The Decurion Corporation
- Website: pacifictheatres.com

Pacific Theatres was an American chain of movie theaters in the Los Angeles metropolitan area of California. Pacific Theatres was owned by The Decurion Corporation which also owned and operated ArcLight Cinemas. In 2008, it sold its store locations in San Diego to Reading Cinemas. In April 2021, Pacific Theatres announced they would not be reopening any of their theater locations after being closed since March 2020 due to the COVID-19 pandemic. In June 2021, the company filed for Chapter 7 bankruptcy. Following the closure, some former Pacific locations were acquired by AMC Theatres.

== History ==
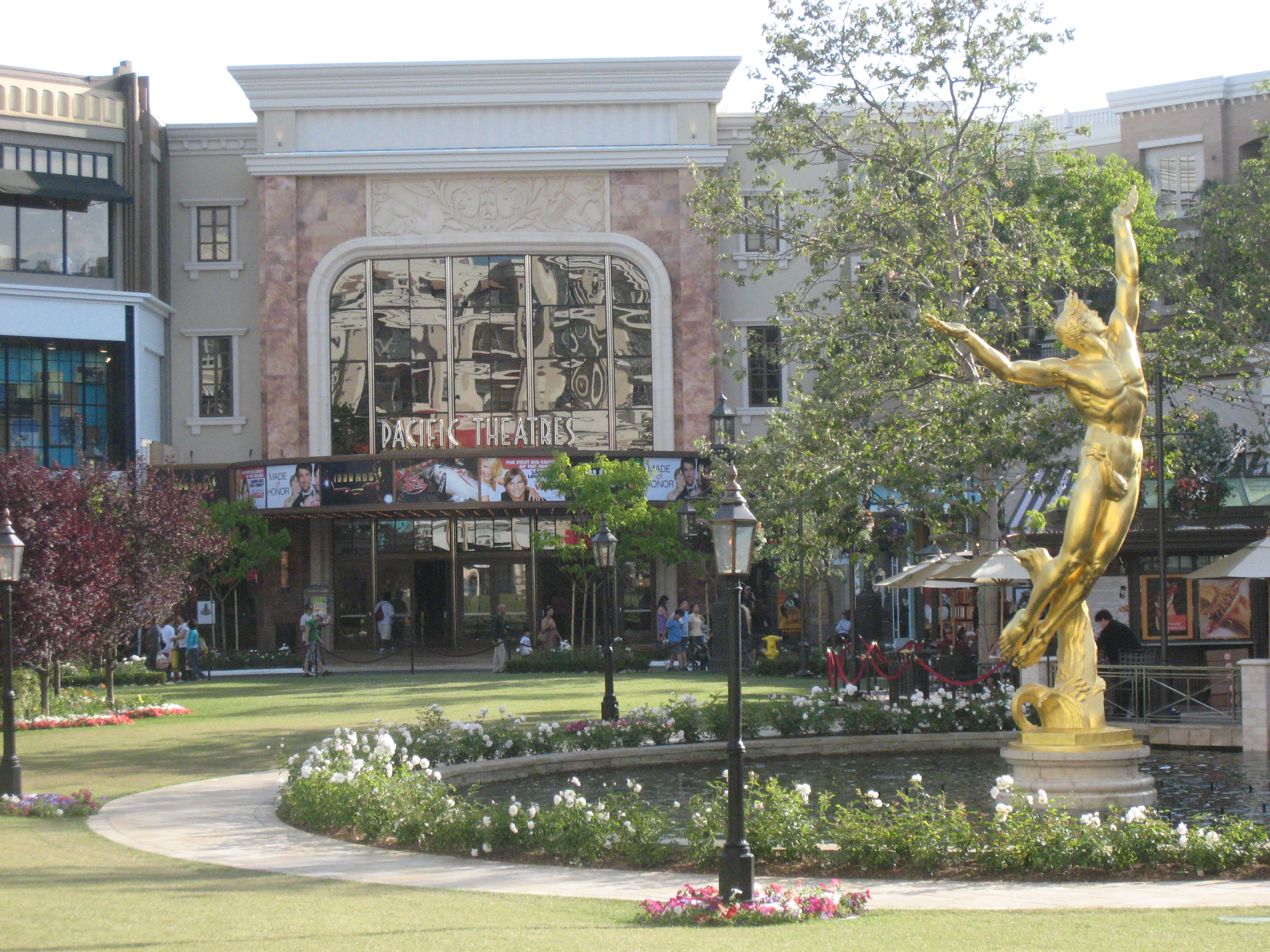
Pacific Theatres at the Americana at Brand shopping center in Glendale, California

William R. Forman founded Pacific Theatres in 1946 and continued to own and operate the company, until 1981, later, in The Decurion Corporation, through closure in April 2021. Pacific took over the theater operations of Cinerama Corporation, including the former Stanley Warner theatres, when Cinerama closed in 1978.

The company had some 300 movie screens in California. Pacific also once operated many drive-in theaters, including in the Pacific Northwest region. They operated the last drive-in in Los Angeles County, the Vineland Drive-In located in the La Puente area. Pacific Theatre also owned the Valley 6 drive-in theatre in Auburn, Washington, which was the last operating drive-in from the United Theatre chain that Pacific ran in the Northwest from the 1950s; it was closed at the end of the 2012 season.

The company acquired many theaters in Hollywood, California over the years, including the Pantages in 1965, Warner Theatre and New View Theatre in 1968, Vine Theatre in the 1970s, and Holly Cinema in 1985.

Pacific was also one of the first theaters to have Samsung Onyx screens, introduced in 2018.

Pacific Theatres was active in real estate development through its Robertson Properties Group, which was originally formed to re-develop former Pacific drive-in theaters. Today Robertson Properties currently acquires and develops retail, office, and residential properties. Developments included theatres at The Grove at Farmers Market in Los Angeles. The other 20 drive-ins in the Northwest that were owned by United Theatre, were redeveloped by Robertson Properties in the 1980s and early 1990s.

In 2007, Reading International Inc purchased 15 theaters within the Pacific chain in California and Hawaii, and on February 22, 2008, became Reading Cinemas, with the exception of the Hawaiian theatres, which remained under the Consolidated Theatres banner.

On March 17, 2020, Pacific Theatres closed all of its theater locations, including ArcLight Cinemas, to comply with COVID-19 public health mandates. In March 2021, when COVID-19 restrictions were eased in Los Angeles County to allow movie theatres to reopen, all of the Pacific Theatres and ArcLight Cinemas locations notably remained closed. On April 12, 2021, Pacific Theatres announced that it would cease operations permanently, stating "this was not the outcome anyone wanted, but despite a huge effort that exhausted all potential options, the company does not have a viable way forward."

On June 18, 2021, Pacific Theatres filed for Chapter 7 bankruptcy. The next day, AMC Theatres announced that it would acquire the leases to the Americana at Brand in downtown Glendale and The Grove at west 3rd Street in Los Angeles locations and that they would reopen in August of that year as part of the AMC chain. The company has not ruled out acquiring the leases of other Pacific Theatres locations. In December 2021, AMC Theatres also announced that they had acquired the lease to the former location at Northridge Fashion Center in Northridge, Los Angeles, which opened in July 2022.
