= ArcLight Cinemas =

American movie theater chain

- Type: Subsidiary
- Industry: Movie theater
- Founded: March 22, 2002; 24 years ago Los Angeles, California, U.S.
- Defunct: April 12, 2021; 5 years ago
- Fate: Permanently closed in April 2021
- Headquarters: Los Angeles, California, U.S.
- Number of locations: 11 (at the time of closure)
- Area served: United States (locations in California, Illinois, Massachusetts and Maryland)
- Owner: The Decurion Corporation
- Website: Archived official website at the Wayback Machine (archive index)

ArcLight Cinemas was an American movie theater chain that operated from 2002 to 2021. It was owned by The Decurion Corporation. The ArcLight chain opened in 2002 as a single theater, the ArcLight Hollywood in Hollywood, Los Angeles, and later expanded to eleven locations in California, Massachusetts, Maryland, and Illinois.

The chain has been credited for pioneering features such as assigned seating, reclining chairs, and in-house bars and restaurants that were later adopted by major theatre chains. Screenings at the ArcLight were usually introduced by an employee and visitors would not be admitted after the screening had started.

ArcLight Cinemas closed temporarily in March 2020, due to the COVID-19 pandemic. On April 12, 2021, ArcLight Cinemas and its sister chain Pacific Theatres announced they would permanently close, citing the lack of a viable path forward after the pandemic. Following the closure, all former ArcLight locations (except Santa Monica) were acquired by other theater chains.

== Locations ==
=== ArcLight Hollywood ===
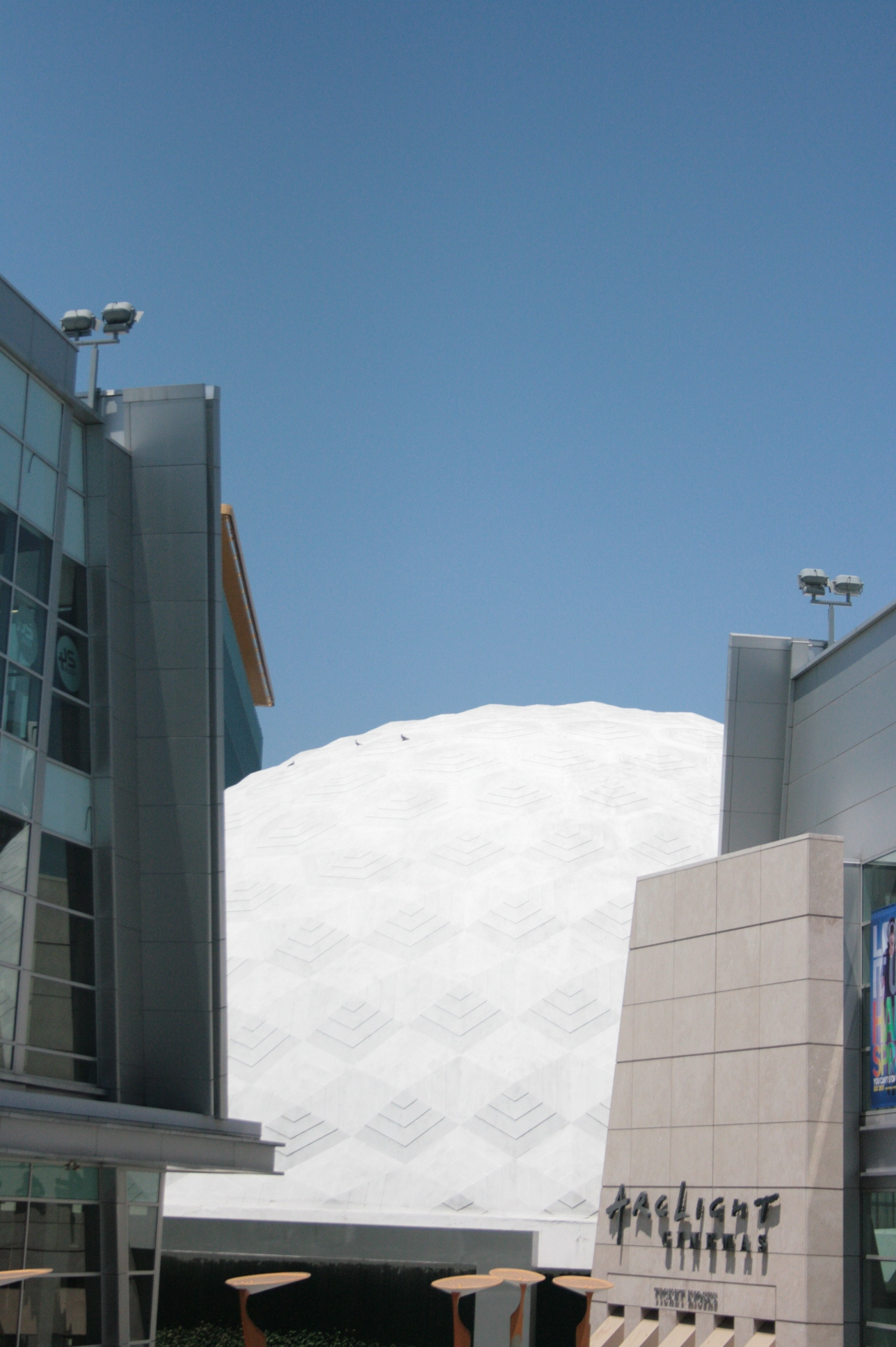
ArcLight Cinemas and the Cinerama Dome.

ArcLight Hollywood was the first theater in the ArcLight chain and was considered to be the flagship location. It opened on March 22, 2002, and was located at 6360 Sunset Boulevard in Hollywood, California. It featured 15 screens with stadium seating, and carried a THX certification for sound and picture presentation. The building was located adjacent to the Cinerama Dome. It was a subsidiary of The Decurion Corporation, which also owned Pacific Theatres.

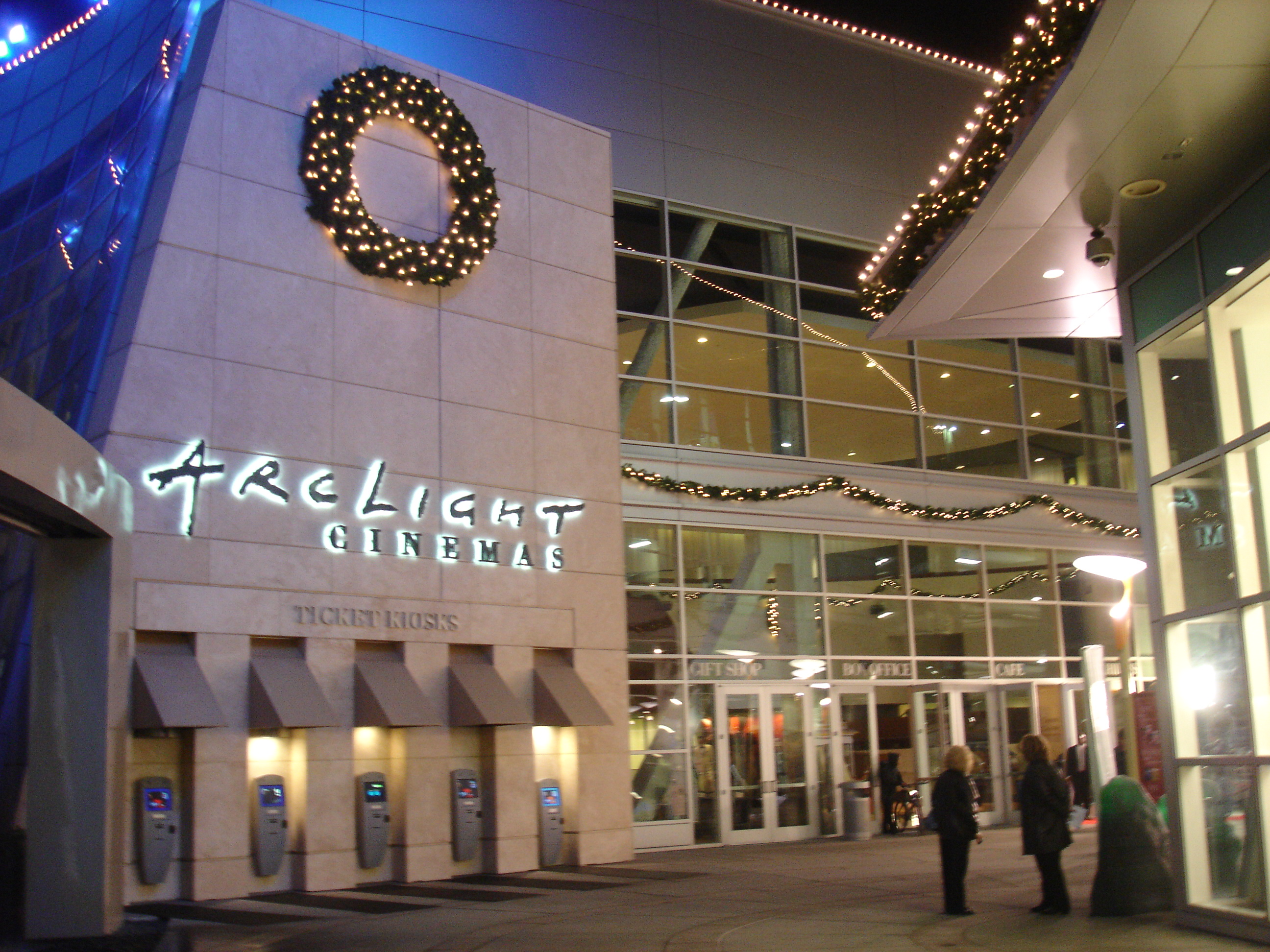
The courtyard entrance of the ArcLight Hollywood complex.

Tickets for all film showings used assigned seating. The only restriction was the inability to select a seat if it created a single-seat space between an already reserved seat, to prevent orphan empty seats that could only be filled by a single individual.

The only promotional material shown before films were trailers. At showtime, immediately before the trailers began, an usher would introduce the film to the audience and state the ArcLight's policies regarding quality assurance. Two ushers would remain in the theater for a few minutes after the film had begun, to ensure that the picture and sound quality were acceptable. The usher would also ask the audience to silence their cell phones and refrain from texting. Seating was prohibited after a film had begun, in correlation with ArcLight's slogan, "Your Movie Time Uninterrupted."

In 2008, the ArcLight Hollywood and the ArcLight Sherman Oaks, which opened in 2007, introduced digital projection. Each location had two houses with Kinoton 35mm projectors for archival and special presentations.

The ArcLight routinely featured exhibits of props and costumes from the films it was screening, as well as local art including 5 different exhibitions from 2009 to 2020, by artist Clifford Bailey and an exhibit dedicated to L. Ron Hubbard.

=== Other locations ===
ArcLight Sherman Oaks opened November 16, 2007, at the Sherman Oaks Galleria, replacing the Galleria Pacific Theater. The grand opening took place on December 14, 2007. A location in Pasadena at The Paseo opened on May 10, 2010. In late 2010, Pacific Theaters refurbished an existing Pacific Theaters multiplex as an ArcLight in El Segundo. The location opened as ArcLight Beach Cities on November 5, 2010.

In November 2012, ArcLight La Jolla opened in San Diego, its first location outside of Los Angeles County. It was located at Westfield UTC, and was part of the mall's $180 million renovation.

In October 2014, the first location outside California opened at Westfield Montgomery in Bethesda, Maryland.

In 2015, ArcLight opened two locations in the Midwestern U.S., both in the Chicago metropolitan area in Illinois. The first theatre in Glenview opened in May 2015, followed by the second location in Chicago's Lincoln Park in November 2015. The Glenview location was previously occupied by Regal and extensively remodeled to the chain's standards, while the Chicago location was the chain's first theatre constructed in the Midwest.

A location in Culver City, California, opened on May 1, 2015. The ArcLight opened the first of two proposed locations in Santa Monica, California, in November 2015 in the newly remodeled Santa Monica Place. In August 2017, the developer for the second ArcLight location announced that they were abandoning the deal, citing doubts about its profitability due to being in close proximity to the existing Santa Monica location. If completed, it would have featured the ArcLight's first IMAX screen.

A location in Boston, Massachusetts, the first Northeastern U.S. location, opened at The Hub on Causeway on November 26, 2019.

== COVID-19 pandemic and closure ==
The ArcLight chain closed temporarily in March 2020, due to the COVID-19 pandemic. On April 12, 2021, Pacific Theatres announced that the ArcLight and Pacific Theatres chains would close permanently, citing a lack of a viable path forward after the pandemic. The parent company, The Decurion Corporation, said in a statement to the Los Angeles Times that, “After shutting our doors more than a year ago, today we must share the difficult and sad news that Pacific will not be reopening its ArcLight Cinemas and Pacific Theatres locations,” Pacific Theatres said in a statement. “This was not the outcome anyone wanted, but despite a huge effort that exhausted all potential options, the company does not have a viable way forward.” After the announcement, the owner of Santa Monica Place evicted ArcLight from its location at the mall, claiming it owed nearly $369,000 in back rent.

=== ArcLight Hollywood reopening ===
In June 2022, it was announced that Decurion Corp. has plans to reopen the ArcLight Hollywood and Cinerama Dome and rename the complex as Cinerama Hollywood, which would include two bars and a restaurant at the location. In September, it was reported that the cinema would not be reopening until at least 2024. In November 2023, it was reported that the cinema's reopening had been delayed until the second quarter of 2025 due largely to the redesign happening in the space including the addition of restaurants and event space. In April 2025, however, a report from Variety said that the reopening of the Cinema was uncertain due to the property manager saying it would not reopen that year and that Decurion was unwilling to either sell or reopen the complex. A petition to reopen the Arclight Hollywood and Cinerama Dome had reached more than 30,000 signatures at the time of the report. When asked about the future of the cinema during a June 2025 public hearing held by the Los Angeles Office of Zoning Administration, land use consultant Elizabeth Peterson of the Elizabeth Peterson Group said:

The property owner is again Dome Center for LLC Robinson Property Group. They have reached out to me and have recently started discussing moving forward with the Cinerama Dome. We don’t have any plans yet, but I think that they wanted to make sure that they did this in a timely manner. The ownership is very committed to moving forward to continue redeveloping the site. Obviously, the theater would be next. And all I can tell you is that they have reached out to me to discuss that. Their goal is to restore the entire property.

In August 2025, The Hollywood Reporter stated that the fate of the Cinerama Dome and ArcLight Hollywood remained in limbo. In October 2025, however, Dome Center LLC, the company that owns the property, filed an application for a conditional-use permit to sell alcohol for on-site consumption at the Arclight Hollywood and Cinerama Dome. A findings document filed with the City Planning Department also mentioned:

When the theater reopens, it will bring additional jobs to Hollywood and reactivate the adjacent streets, increasing safety and once again bringing vibrancy to the surrounding area.

However, no timetable for the reopening was given.

In July 2026, Sony Pictures announced it had acquired the leases to the former ArcLight Hollywood and the Cinerama Dome, and will reopen the ArcLight Hollywood as the Alamo Drafthouse Hollywood in 2028.

=== Subsequent acquisitions of other former ArcLight locations ===
On June 19, 2021, Regal Cinemas acquired the lease of the location of the former ArcLight at Sherman Oaks Galleria. Regal planned a $10 million renovation with the addition of IMAX with Laser, RPX & 4DX auditoriums. The theater reopened in July 2021 as part of the Regal chain. In January 2023, however, it was announced that the theater would close on February 15 unless the lease was renegotiated, but it continued to operate after the date had passed. In May 2023, Regal reached a new lease agreement with the Galleria to continue operating the theater as part of their company. In May 2025, Regal announced that an IMAX would be added to the cinema.

In November 2021, it was announced that Landmark Theaters had acquired the lease to The Glen Town Center's former ArcLight in Glenview, Illinois. It reopened as part of the company's chain in November 2022.

In December 2021, AMC Theatres announced that they had acquired the lease to the former ArcLight Chicago 14 in Lincoln Park, Chicago, which reopened as part of the AMC chain in April 2022.

In February 2022, AMC reached a deal to acquire the leases to the former ArcLight at Westfield UTC mall in San Diego, California, and the former ArcLight at Westfield Montgomery in Bethesda, Maryland. The former reopened during that month, and the latter resumed business in March of that year. In December 2022, it was announced that AMC acquired the lease to the former ArcLight located at The Hub on Causeway in Boston and it was reopened as part of the company's chain in November 2023.

In July 2022, Amazon acquired the lease of the former Culver City, California location and planned to operate it as its first movie theatre. It reopened as the Culver Theater in December 2022.

In April 2023, it was announced that Regal had acquired the lease to the former ArcLight theater at The Paseo in Pasadena, California. It reopened as a Regal location in June 2023 with plans to add ScreenX and 4DX auditoriums.

In November 2023, Cinema West Theaters announced that they would remodel the former ArcLight theater in El Segundo, California as the new "CinemaWest Beach Cities". It was originally slated to open in Summer 2024. In January 2025, the theater's page at Cinema West's website posted an opening date of Spring 2025 and an image alluding to a partnership with Pink's Hot Dogs The theater reopened on February 13, 2025, with ScreenX and 4DX auditoriums.

As of 2025, the Santa Monica location is the only to have not reopened. In 2023, it was announced that the structure at Santa Monica Place containing Bloomingdale's and the former Santa Monica ArcLight would be renovated as a 48,000-square-foot flagship outpost for Arte Museum, an immersive digital media destination, with the remaining space to possibly house a high-end fitness facility.

=== Table ===
Location	City	Opening date	Acquired by	Reopening date
Hollywood	Los Angeles, California	2002	Alamo Drafthouse Cinema	Planned 2028
Sherman Oaks	Los Angeles, California	2007	Regal Cinemas	July 2021
Pasadena	Pasadena, California	2010	Regal Cinemas	June 2023
Beach Cities	El Segundo, California	2010	Cinema West	February 2025
La Jolla	San Diego, California	2012	AMC Theatres	February 2022
Bethesda	Bethesda, Maryland	2014	AMC Theatres	March 2022
Glenview	Glenview, Illinois	2015	Landmark Theatres	November 2022
Chicago	Chicago, Illinois	2015	AMC Theatres	April 2022
Culver City	Culver City, California	2015	Amazon (The Culver Theater)	December 2022
Santa Monica	Santa Monica, California	2015	—	—
Boston	Boston, Massachusetts	2019	AMC Theatres	November 2023
