= The Dinosaurs of Santa Monica =

1989 topiary series in Santa Monica, California, U.S.

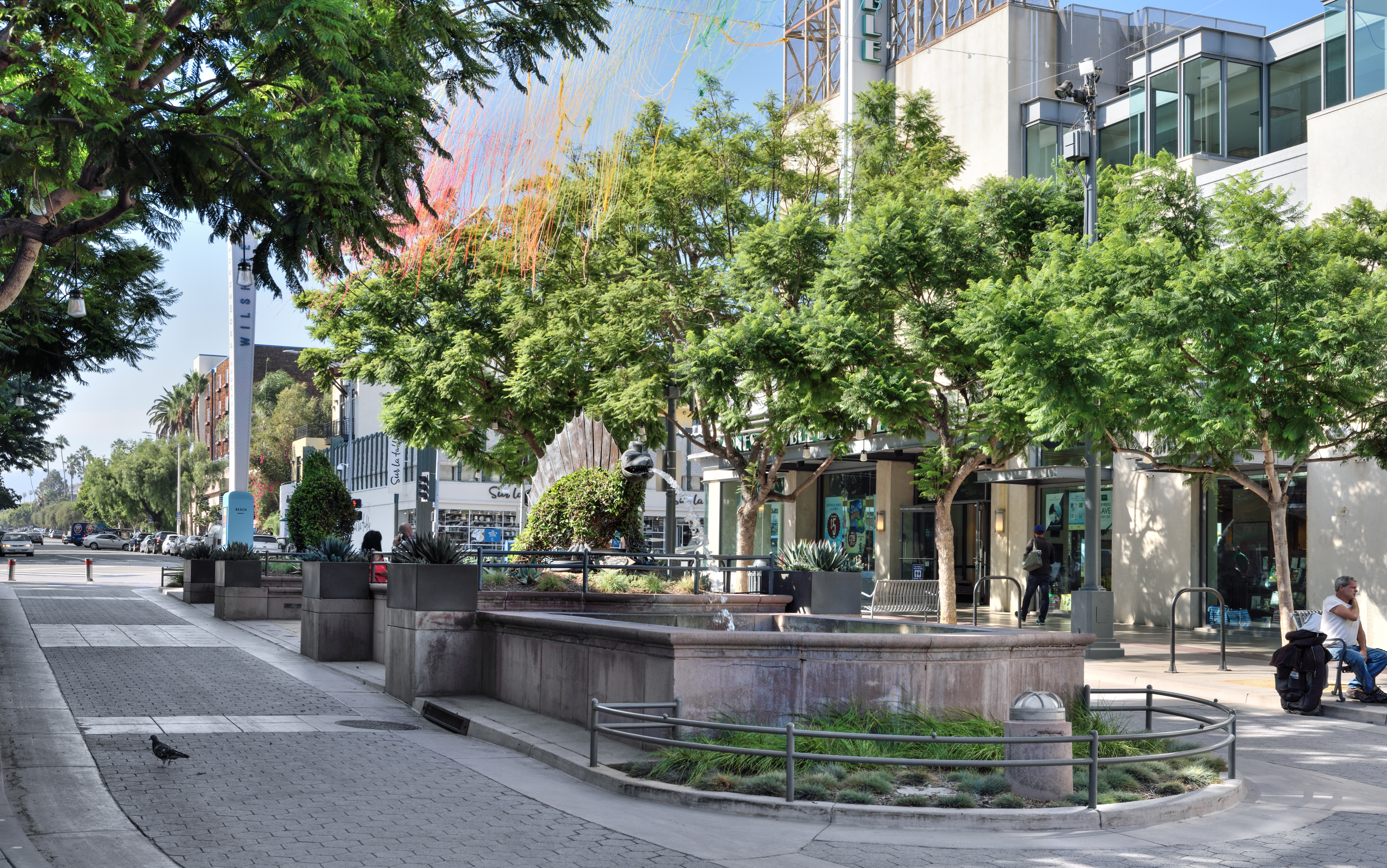
- Year: 1989
- Location: Santa Monica, California, U.S.

The Dinosaurs of Santa Monica is a 1989 topiary sculpture series installed along the Third Street Promenade in Santa Monica, California. Featured are six dinosaurs made of stainless steel, copper, and plant materials: a Triceratops measuring approximately 5 x 14 x 3 ft., a Stegosaurus measuring approximately 6 x 14 x 3 ft., an Apatosaurus measuring approximately 12 ft. x 34 ft. x 4 ft. 4 in., a Diplodocus measuring approximately 12 ft. x 35 ft. x 4 ft. 4 in., a Dimetrodon (albeit not technically a dinosaur) measuring approximately 5 x 14 x 3 ft., and an Iguanodon measuring approximately 6 ft. x 14 ft. x 3 ft. 4 in. The series was surveyed by the Smithsonian Institution's 'Save Outdoor Sculpture!' program in 1994. In 2020, a Third Street Promenade property owner filed a lawsuit against the city, alleging two of the statues housed rodents. The statues have been described as "whimsical".

== See also ==
- Cultural depictions of dinosaurs
- Stegosaurus in popular culture
