= The Decurion Corporation =

American corporation

- Industry: Entertainment
- Founded: 1946
- Founder: William R. Forman
- Headquarters: Los Angeles, California, United States
- Key people: Christopher Forman (CEO) Tait Forman (Vice President of Development)
- Products: Motion pictures, movie theaters
- Website: decurion.com www.robertsonpropertiesgroup.com

The Decurion Corporation is an American corporation with headquarters in Los Angeles, California. It was the parent company of Pacific Theatres and ArcLight Hollywood.

The Decurion Corporation is one of the three organizations studied throughout the book An Everyone Culture: Becoming a Deliberately Developmental Organization. Internet rumors allege that the company is affiliated with the Church of Scientology.

On April 12, 2021, its subsidiaries, Pacific Theatres and ArcLight Cinemas announced they would not be reopening any of their theater locations after being closed since March 2020 due to the COVID-19 pandemic and said in a statement to the Los Angeles Times that, “After shutting our doors more than a year ago, today we must share the difficult and sad news that Pacific will not be reopening its ArcLight Cinemas and Pacific Theatres locations,” Pacific Theatres said in a statement. “This was not the outcome anyone wanted, but despite a huge effort that exhausted all potential options, the company does not have a viable way forward.”

Although the majority of Pacific's theatres were purchased by AMC Theatres and Regal Entertainment, Decurion retained ownership of the Cinerama Dome and ArcLight Hollywood location but have refused to reopen them or lease them to other exhibitors.

During an April 2026 demonstration aimed at reopening the Cinerama Dome, the Forman family alerted police to the presence of activists. This response, overseen by Tait and Christopher Forman, was met with significant backlash from the preservationist community and the general public.
