= Olfactory art =

Art form that uses scent as a medium

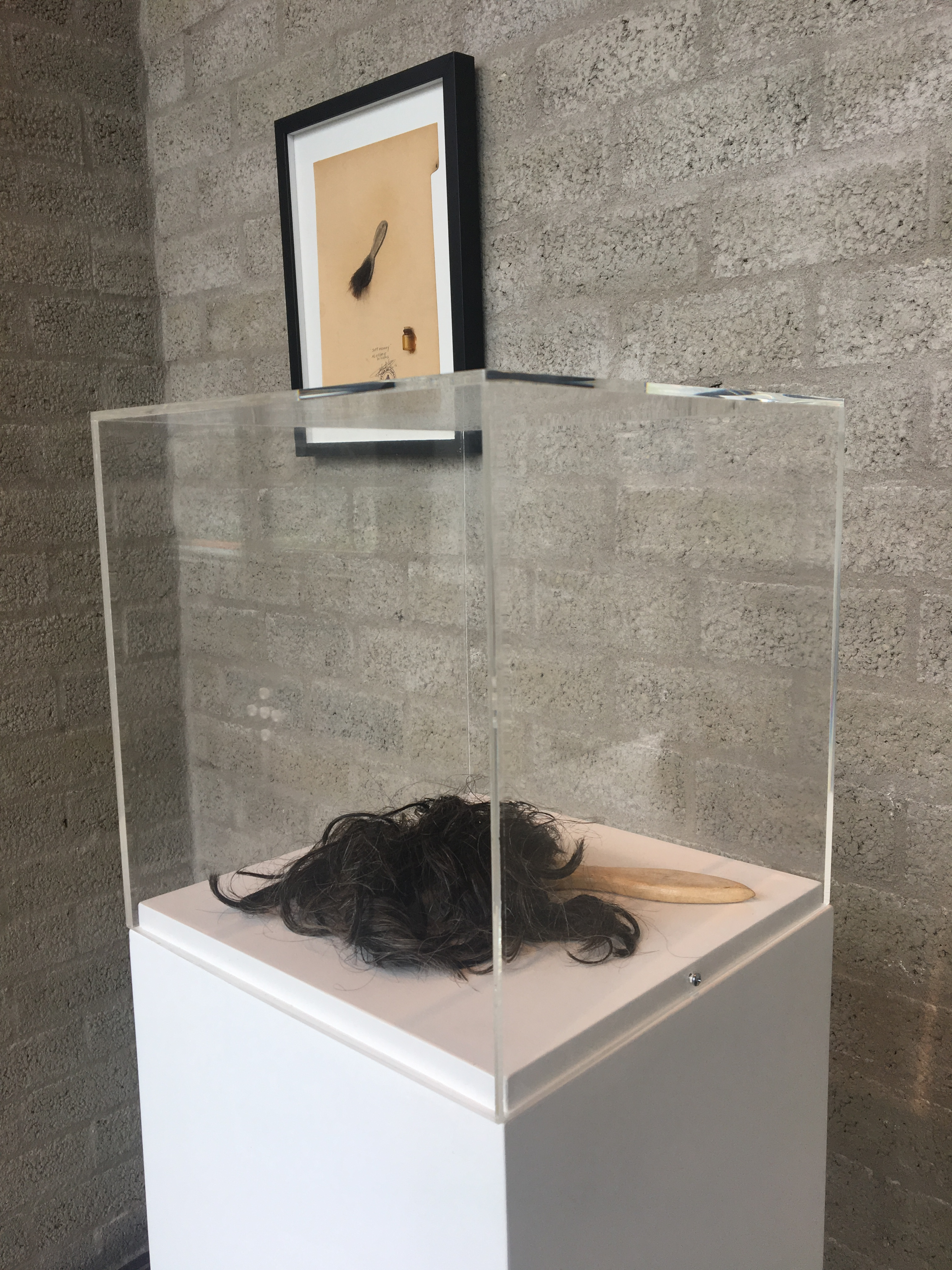
Soft memory - Hair brush with real hair that belonged to survivors of WWII and gunpowder scent. Olfactory artwork by Peter De Cupere.

Olfactory art is an art form that uses scents as a medium. Olfactory art includes perfume as well as other applications of scent.

The art form has been a recognized genre since at least 1980. Marcel Duchamp was one of the first artists who pioneered with using scents in art.

== Examples of olfactory art ==
In 1938, the poet Benjamin Péret roasted coffee behind screens at the Exposition Internationale du Surréalisme which was orchestrated by Marcel Duchamp, and was possibly one of the first true examples of olfactory art. (from the book "Salon to Biennial - Exhibitions that Made Art History", Volume 1: 1863-1959 Hardcover – July 2, 2008 by Bruce Altshuler)

A series of chess sets where the pieces could be distinguished only by scent were made by Takako Saito in 1965. Spice Chess and Smell Chess relied on the use of spices or scented liquids in the pieces. In Spice Chess, the black king was scented with asafetida, the black queen with cayenne, and the black bishops with cumin. The white pieces included cinnamon pawns, nutmeg rooks, ginger knights and an anise white queen.

Richard Wilson’s installation 20:50 (1987) is a prominent example of the use of industrial smell in contemporary art. The work consists of a gallery space filled to waist height with sump oil, producing an intense odour that accompanies the visual illusion of an apparently infinite surface. Critics have emphasised that the smell of oil is integral to the work’s psychological impact, reinforcing sensations of immersion, danger and disorientation.

'Eau Claire' is a self portrait in scent by Clara Ursitti created in 1993-1994. A handblown glass bottle containing the scent of the artist.

Self-Portrait in Scent, Sketch no. 1 was a 1994 exhibit by Clara Ursitti at The Centre for Contemporary Arts in Glasgow, Scotland. It consisted of a small, specially constructed room outfitted with motion sensors and scent dispensers. Art historian Caro Verbeek, of the Vrije Universiteit and the Rijksmuseum Amsterdam, cites this work as a breakthrough in both artistic and technological terms.

Nancy Rubins’ Mattresses and Cakes (1995) exemplifies olfactory art that engages both the senses and social critique. The work is composed of 59 salvaged mattresses bound together and layered with 299 Entenmann’s cakes, producing a large suspended sculpture whose sweet, decaying odours fill the exhibition space. The combination of salvaged materials and food emphasises excess and consumer culture, creating an experience that is simultaneously humorous, overwhelming, and uncomfortable. Rubins’ use of smell as a material component highlights its role in shaping audience perception and meaning.

Mona Hatoum’s installation Present Tense (1996) demonstrates the use of smell as a vehicle for cultural memory and political meaning. The work consists of olive oil soap blocks from Nablus embedded with red glass beads outlining fragmented Palestinian territories defined by the Oslo Accords. The scent of the soap has been noted as a key element of the installation, evoking domestic space, regional tradition and a sense of place while reinforcing the work’s engagement with displacement and political tension.

Green Aria: A Scent Opera was an exhibit by Christophe Laudamiel at the Guggenheim that incorporated over two dozen fragrances pumped through special "scent microphones" to 148 seats, accompanied by music. Some scents were intended to invoke natural fragrances, while others were described as "Industrial" or "Absolute Zero".

Sillage is an ongoing olfactory public artwork by Brian Goeltzenleuchter in which the artist asks a city's residents to name smells associated with different regions of the city. He then translates the responses into bottled fragrances representing each region. The project culminates in an event at an art museum during which visitors are sprayed with the scent of their neighborhood and are encouraged to interact with others who smelled differently. The resulting scent portrait is intended to stimulate conversation and provide a representation of the museum's demographic. In 2014, the Santa Monica Museum of Art (now Institute for Contemporary Art in Los Angeles) hosted the project. In 2016, the project was realized at the Walters Art Museum in Baltimore.

LacrimAu was an exhibit by the Czech artist Federico Díaz at an exposition at Shanghai. An individual could enter a glass cube containing a 30 inch tall golden teardrop. After putting on a headband, the person's brainwaves would be read by sensors, which would translate them into a uniquely tailored scent. It was described as a "surprise hit".

Various attempts have been made to enhance films with scents. A Swiss professor named Hans Laube demonstrated the concept at the 1939 New York World's Fair. The AromaRama system released scents through the air conditioning system, and was first used for the travelogue Behind the Great Wall in December 1959. The 1960 film Scent of Mystery used the Smell-O-Vision system, located under the seats, to release aromas which were integral to the story. Polyester (1981) used "Odorama" scratch-and-sniff cards with 10 numbered spots for a similar effect. Scents were also used in the 2023 film Postcard from Earth.

Turkish sculptor Ahmet Yiğider has incorporated olfactory elements into several of his large-scale installations. In Karınca Yuvası (Ant Nest, 2021) at CerModern in Ankara, he combined sculptural forms with scent to evoke the collective labor and sensory environment of an ant colony. At the 9th International Çanakkale Biennial, his installation Fig, Human, Soil (2023) merged olfactory components with organic materials to explore the ties between agriculture, landscape, and cultural memory.

== Land art and environmental installation ==
Walter De Maria’s Earth Room installations are frequently cited as early examples of olfactory experience within land art. First realised in Munich in 1968 and later recreated in Darmstadt (1974) and New York (1977), the installations consist of large quantities of topsoil filling an interior gallery space. The New York Earth Room, maintained by the Dia Art Foundation, is the only surviving version. Critics have noted that the smell of soil is encountered before the visual elements, playing a central role in evoking associations with land, agriculture and pre-industrial nature.

== Organic processes and decay ==
Belgian artist Jan Fabre has produced several works in which smell and organic decay form essential components. His installation De lente komt eraan (1979), composed of onions and potatoes suspended from the ceiling and allowed to rot, foregrounds naturally evolving odours as part of the artwork. When recreated in museum contexts, the work has generated public controversy due to its overpowering stench, situating it within broader traditions of conceptual and organic art that incorporate transformation and sensory excess.

During the 1990s, olfactory elements became increasingly prominent in mainstream contemporary art, notably in the work of Damien Hirst. Installations such as A Thousand Years (1990), featuring a decaying cow’s head, live flies and an insect-o-cutor within a glass vitrine, produce strong and often unsettling smells. Critics have argued that odour is central to the work’s visceral impact, reinforcing themes of life, death and entropy and positioning smell as an essential component rather than an incidental effect.

== Artists ==
- Peter de Cupere
- Wolfgang Georgsdorf
- Brian Goeltzenleuchter
- Christophe Laudamiel
- Annick Ménardo
- Gayil Nalls
- Guy Bleus
- Sissel Tolaas
- Clara Ursitti
- Maki Ueda
- Anicka Yi
- Ahmet Yiğider
