= Scentography =

Technique for creating and storing odor

Scentography is the technique of creating and storing odor by artificially recreating a smell using chemical and electronic means.

DigiScents Inc was among the more recent pioneers of the technology, developing DigiScent (later iSmell) in 1999 as a device that would plug into a computer's USB port and generate scents dependent on the online content being viewed. The company ceased trading in 2011.

In 2013, Amy Radcliffe, a Master's student in the Textile Futures department of Central Saint Martins, London introduced a prototype of a desktop device to record aromas. For the project, she drew on headspace technology pioneered in the 1980s by Roman Kaiser to capture smells in the air around certain objects.

Called the Madeleine, after the Marcel Proust episode from Remembrance of Things Past, the device is a working prototype of a new kind of camera to record smell. It consists of a funnel to be placed over the object with the scent you wish to capture. This is attached to a pump that draws air into an odor trap made of a porous polymer resin. According to Radcliffe, it can take from a few minutes to a whole day to capture the odour in liquid form, depending on its intensity.

So far, several samples have been sent for analysis in a gas chromatography–mass spectrometry machine at a fragrance laboratory. In the scenario developed for the prototype, the Madeleine would be taken for local lab processing in a similar way to conventional photographic film.

The device was exhibited during Milan Fashion Week in April 2013.

== See also ==
- Digital scent technology
- Electronic nose
- Olfactometer
- Smell-O-Vision

== External sources ==
- Madeleine article on Big Think
- Amy Radcliffe website
