= Smelling screen =

Type of digital scent technology

A smelling screen is a type of digital scent technology, unveiled in 2013, that combines a display screen, similar to a television or computer monitor, with an odor emitting device capable of pinpointing the smell to a specific portion of the displayed image. It is believed to be the first device to incorporate smells into a television screen, though certainly not the first to synchronize smell with a displayed image (see Digital scent technology).

== Description ==
The smelling screen combines a digital display with four small fans, one at each corner of the display. Odor stored in tiny gel packets is emitted and blown parallel to the screen. By varying the speed and strength of each fan, an emitted odor is moved to a specific spot on the screen. The fans operate at a very low speed, making it difficult for the user to perceive airflow; instead he or she perceives the smell as coming directly out of the screen and object displayed at that location.

== Development ==
In 2013, a group of researchers from the Tokyo University of Agriculture and Technology unveiled a prototype smelling screen to the public at the ACM/IEEE Virtual Reality Conference.

The product is in the early stages of development with no plans for commercial distribution in the near future.

== See also ==
- iSmell
- Smell-O-Vision
