= World Sensorium =

Art project

The World Sensorium is an olfactory art project initiated by Gayil Nalls, an interdisciplinary artist based in New York. Nalls conceived the project intending to foster cross-cultural understanding through shared sensory experiences with the aim to cultivate an awareness of humanity’s collective connection to nature and its impact on the human spirit and psyche.

This initiative, which is described as a 'Social Sculpture' incorporates culturally significant aromatic plants from 225 countries, with quantities proportional to each country's population. Each scent is selected to evoke the most significant olfactory memories of individuals from their respective nations.

The World Sensorium project falls within the realms of Olfactory art, Participatory art, and Environmental art. Since its inception in 1999, the project has been showcased in Times Square in 2000 and at the Vatican's Millennium Jubilee.

== Creative Inspiration ==
=== Berlin Wall ===
Nalls conceived the idea of a "World Scent" over a decade before its realization on December 28, 1989, at the Brandenburg Gate, where she found herself atop the Berlin Wall amidst a throng of people. Moved by the palpable momentum and collective energy of the crowd, Nalls was inspired to envision a formula for the World Sensorium that would encapsulate the essence of inclusivity and universal recognition.

=== Relationship to permutatude theory ===
The World Sensorium was developed to and foster a global sense of identity and memory. Rooted in permutation theory and scientific principles, the ongoing project reflects the dynamics of cultural transformation and globalization. Conceptualized as an embodiment of global consciousness, this olfactory sculpture engages individuals through their sense of smell, often in interactive and performative environments.

== Methodology ==
=== Determination of Ingredients ===
The selection of ingredients for the World Sensorium project involved identifying historical scents from all countries worldwide, with cultural significance. This process relied on survey research to gather quantitative information, providing the necessary data for creating the scent profiles. The chosen ingredients consisted of natural plant oils derived from trees, flowers, grasses, or herbs.

Many of the plants were initially identified by their local vernacular names, requiring further research to confirm their Latin or English names. In cases where an English name was unavailable, additional efforts were made to ensure accurate identification. Gayil Nalls, the project initiator, enlisted the expertise of botanical taxonomy scholars from institutions such as the New York Botanical Garden and ethnobotanists from the National Tropical Botanical Garden in Hawaii to assist in verifying the botanical names of the materials. For example, the colloquial names "Gowe" (Cyperus articulatus) from Senegal and "" (Cananga odorata), also known as Ylang-ylang, from American Samoa were properly identified.

The overarching goal was to faithfully represent the complex molecular compositions of each plant, enabling humans to perceive the scent as authentically as if experienced in its natural habitat. This approach aimed to evoke similar psychological, emotional, neurological, and immune responses as observed in the cultural traditions associated with each plant. To achieve this, all raw materials used in the project were distilled from or extracted directly from the respective plants.

The composition of these ingredients was determined based on projected population percentages for each country as of the year 2000, ensuring a proportional representation of scents from different regions around the world.

== Impact as World Peace Project ==
=== Global Communications ===
During her quantitative research, Nalls engaged in dialogue with countries that the United States has historically had strained relations with, including Iran (Rose), Iraq (Date Palm), Libya (Orange Blossom), and Cuba (Tobacco). These communications, which sometimes extended over several months, were aimed at identifying culturally significant scents for inclusion in the World Sensorium project.

A particularly poignant moment in the project's creation occurred when representatives from the Israeli Embassy in Washington and the Palestinian representative from the United Nations contacted Nalls within minutes of each other. They both reported that their national choices for inclusion in the project were the Olive Tree, symbolizing its revered association with peace.

=== Recognition and honors ===
In 1998, Gayil Nalls' creative achievement with the World Sensorium project was officially recognized when it received endorsement from the President's Committee on the Arts and Humanities. Additionally, the project was sponsored by the United Nations Educational, Scientific, and Cultural Organization (UNESCO) as an original cultural initiative aimed at fostering goodwill and peace, coinciding with the United Nations' International Year for the Culture of Peace.

In a letter addressed to Nalls, Dr. Federico Mayor, the Director-General of UNESCO and a brain biochemist, praised World Sensorium as a "highly original cultural initiative" that would undoubtedly contribute to creating a climate of goodwill and peace during that significant moment in time. The mayor expressed confidence that the project would facilitate understanding and collaboration among nations, further promoting peace and harmony on a global scale.

== Cultural Significance ==
=== Olfactory Art and Aesthetics ===
With her project World Sensorium and more recent works, Gayil Nalls challenges traditional concepts of aesthetics by prioritizing the olfactory sense over the historically dominant sense of vision. While visual art continues to hold prominence, artists, including Nalls, are increasingly exploring the sense of smell to create emotionally and phenomenologically resonant works in the emerging genre of Olfactory Art. Like many other olfactory artists, Nalls exclusively utilizes natural fragrances and essential oils in her creations.

=== Participatory Art ===
For Gayil Nalls, the link between olfaction and social or participatory art is grounded in the evolutionary biology of the sense of smell. As the oldest sense, olfaction can evoke both individual and collective memories. Its role in chemosensory communication also influences collective action in participatory social and art processes.

The World Sensorium project was conceived as a collaborative endeavor. Nalls envisioned the World Sensorium to be experienced collectively, and its creation often involved the assistance of volunteers in gathering the phytogenic materials required for its realization.

=== Avant-gardism and Political Art ===
In its use of culturally significant plant materials, Nalls advances the notion that art should be brought closer to the Praxis of Life. World Sensorium is all-inclusive in its conception – a reflection of actual human-plant relations, making every experience of World Sensorium a connection to the world's collective ecology and human consciousness. Nalls introduced a universal language for cross-cultural efforts toward peace by evoking co-evolution with nature. Ken Johnson called World Sensorium a "utopian project" and "an olfactory metaphor for world unity".

== Exhibition History ==
- In 1997 Times Square Business Improvement District invited Nalls to premier World Sensorium at the Times Square Millennial celebration.
- On January 1, 2000, at midnight, thousands of silver squares were embedded with this "fragrant symbol of unity," "rained down" from surrounding buildings in New York at the millennial celebration "Times Square 2000: Crossroads of the World" over the heads millions of people. The 4½-inch rounded-square paperwork Nalls designed, has an inch-wide open flap where 10 grams of World Sensorium are microencapsulated.
- Simultaneously, Word Sensorium was presented at Millenium Around the World, The New Year's Eve celebration, co-hosted by President and Mrs. Clinton and Secretary of State Madeleine Albright, for the families of Washington's diplomatic community at the International Trade Center in the Ronald Reagan Building, organized by the GSA and the White House Millennium Council, Washington, DC.
- World Sensorium was next included in The Vatican's Jubilee of the Year 2000 and was featured in SacroSanto, for May, 2000 at Sala 1, the Museum of Contemporary Art of Rome (MACRO), Italy.
- In January 2000, there was a World Sensorium scent installation at Steffany Martz Gallery (New York, NY).
- In March 2002, a large World Sensorium exhibition and presentation was held at Ylvisaker Fine Arts Center, Bethany Lutheran College, Mankato, MN.
- In 2010 World Sensorium was installed as a lab for the event at Noć biologije (Biology Night), Zagreb University, Zagreb, Croatia, World Sensorium, curated by Dr. Julija Erhardt and students of the Neurophysiology department.
- In 2010 there was a World Sensorium olfactory meditation session at Newhouse Center for Contemporary Art, Sailors' Snug Harbor, Staten Island, New York
- In 2011, World Sensorium was included in Objects of Devotion and Desire: Medieval Relic to Contemporary Art, at The Bertha and Karl Leubsdorf Art Gallery, Hunter College, New York. An exhibition organized around themes of Vision/Senses, Body/Death. Fragment/Composite, Photograph/Index and Time/Memory/Ritual, and included Medieval objects from The Metropolitan Museum and works from contemporary artists such as Christian Boltanski, Olafur Eliasson and Joseph Beuys, creator of the concept of Social Sculpture.
- Also in 2011, Nalls was invited to participate in the Think Art: Memory Conference at Boston University, MA, where World Sensorium was shown in an accompanying exhibition, October 7–28.
- World Sensorium was next featured in Seeing Ourselves at The MUSECPMI Museum March 6 - April 14, 2012, along with Permutatude/Self, a self-portrait composed of a CAT scan (Computerized Axial Tomography) and a photograph taken in the early morning of January 1, 1990, after the fall of the Berlin Wall and New Year's Eve at the Brandenburg Gate.
- In 2015, World Sensorium was shown at the exhibitions There's Something in the Air at Museum Villa Rot and in Five Senses at Stary Browar in Poznań, Poland. Visitors were invited to self-apply and experience the work.

Additionally, World Sensorium has been shown in group exhibitions in the United States, England, Sweden, and Slovenia.
