= Gayil =

Gayil may be,

- Gayil language
- Gayil Nalls
