= Cinerama Adventure =

- Directed by: David Strohmaier
- Story by: David Strohmaier
- Produced by: Randy Gitsch
- Cinematography: Gerald Saldo
- Edited by: David Strohmaier
- Production company: C.A. Productions; Turner Entertainment
- Distributed by: Warner Home Video
- Release date: 2002
- Running time: 97 minutes
- Country: United States
- Language: English

Cinerama Adventure is a 2002 documentary about the history of the Cinerama widescreen film process. It tells the story of the widescreen process' evolution, from a primitive multi-screen pyramid process to a Vitarama format that played a big part in World War II, to the three-screen panoramic process it eventually became. The film includes interviews with surviving cast and crew who personally worked on the Cinerama films, plus vintage interviews with late creator Fred Waller.

To simulate the Cinerama experience for The Cinerama Adventure, a special three-panel telecine process termed SmileBox (a registered trade mark of C.A. Productions), was developed by video and film expert Greg Kimble for use in this film; it was later utilized for TV broadcasts and Blu-ray releases of Cinerama-formatted films such as This is Cinerama and How the West Was Won.

It was written, produced, directed, edited and narrated by David Strohmaier; produced by Randy Gitsch; executive produced by David's wife, Carin-Anne Strohmaier; and was presented in association with the American Society of Cinematographers. The running time is 97 minutes.

In 2008, the documentary was released as an extra feature on the DVD and Blu-ray releases of the movie How the West Was Won by Warner Bros. Entertainment Inc.

== Cast ==
- Carroll Baker
- Joe Dante
- Otto Lang
- A. C. Lyles
- Leonard Maltin
- David Raksin
- Debbie Reynolds
- Russ Tamblyn
- Lowell Thomas, Jr.
- Mike Todd, Jr.
- Eli Wallach
