= Ursitti =

Ursitti is a surname. Notable people with the surname include:

- Clara Ursitti (born 1968), Canadian-Italian artist
- Susan Ursitti (born 1957), American actress
