= Kelley Roos =

Pen name of Audrey Kelley und William Roos

Kelley Roos is the pseudonym used by the husband-and-wife writing team Audrey Roos (1912–1982) and William Roos (1911–1987). They wrote numerous crime novels from the 1940s onwards and lived in Martha's Vineyard.

== Meeting ==
William Roos and Audrey Kelley met in the 1930s while both taking a speech class in hopes of pursuing a career on the stage. They first performed on a showboat on the banks of the Ohio River before landing small roles in New York City. They married around this time.

== Collaboration ==
During World War II, they adopted the pseudonym Kelley Roos to begin writing mystery novels. "Made Up to Kill" (1940), the first novel in the series featuring Jeff and Haila Troy, takes place backstage at a theater and is an immediate success. Jeff, a photographer, and Haila, a former actress, then find themselves mixed up in a dozen classic whodunits, mixed with comedy, delivered by Kelley Roos in the form of novels or long stories. The Troys' fame is such that they are embodied by Brian Aherne and Loretta Young in the 1942 film A Night to Remember, directed by Richard Wallace, and then, adapted for television, starring Robert Sterling and Virginia Gilmore.

The most famous title in the series, The Shadow of a Chance, was also adapted into a film, Scent of Mystery, directed by Jack Cardiff. The Troys were removed in writing the film and the setting was moved to Spain. After ending the Troy series in 1966, Kelley Roos wrote several detective novels with a focus on thrillers.

== Translations to other languages ==
French-language editions appeared in the 1950s. German-language editions appeared in the 1960s, among others in the series Mitternachtsbücher (Verlag Kurt Desch) and Die schwarzen Kriminalromane (Scherz Verlag).

== Works ==
=== Jeff and Haila Troy series ===
- 1940: Made Up To Kill
- 1941: If the Shroud Fits
- 1942: The Frightened Stiff
- 1945: There Was a Crooked Man
- 1947: Ghost of a Chance
- 1948: Murder in Any Language
- 1966: One False Move

=== Other crime novels ===
- 1956: She Died Dancing
- 1958: Requiem for a Blonde
- 1959: Scent of Mystery
- 1965: Grave Danger
- 1965: Necessary Evil
- 1965: A Few Days in Madrid
- 1966: Cry in the Night
- 1967: Who Saw Maggie Brown?
- 1968: To Save His Life
- 1970: Suddenly One Night
- 1970: What Did Hattie See?
- 1971: Bad Trip
- 1981: Murder on Martha's Vineyard

== Adaptations ==
=== Film ===
- 1942: A Night to Remember (with Brian Aherne and Loretta Young) – film adaptation of The Frightened Stiff
- 1943: Dangerous Blondes (with Allyn Joslyn and Evelyn Keyes) – film adaptation of If the Shroud Fits
- 1959: Voulez-vous danser avec moi? (with Brigitte Bardot and Henri Vidal) – film adaptation of She Died Dancing
- 1960: Scent of Mystery (with Denholm Elliott and Peter Lorre) – film adaptation of Ghost of a Chance; first film to use the Smell-O-Vision system

=== Radio play ===
- Bayerischer Rundfunk [Bavarian Radio] 1973: Freundin in allen Todeslagen (with Monika Peitsch, Harald Leipnitz and Hannelore Schroth) – Adaptation of Cry in the Night

== Bibliography ==
- Jacques Baudou, 'Les Métamorphoses de la chouette : Détective-club' Futuropolis, 1986 pp. 129–31
- Lesley Henderson, Twentieth century crime and mystery writers, Chicago, St. James Press, coll. « Twentieth-century writers series », 1991, pp. 775–76
- Claude Mesplède and Jean-Jacques Schleret, 'SN, voyage au bout de la Noire : inventaire de 732 auteurs et de leurs œuvres publiés en séries Noire et Blème : suivi d'une filmographie complète' Futuropolis 1982 pp. 315–16
