= Close Relations =

Close Relations may refer to:

- Close Relations (1933 film)
- Close Relations (1935 film)
