= William Roos (writer) =

American novelist, playwright and screenwriter (1911–1987)

William E. Roos (May 25, 1911, Pittsburgh, Pennsylvania – March 1, 1987, United States) was an American novelist, playwright, and screenwriter. He authored works using both his own name and the pseudonym William Rand. He also co-authored several works with his wife, the writer Audrey Roos, under the pen name Kelley Roos. These included more than twenty mystery novels; nine of which featured the married sleuths Jeff and Haila Troy. In 1961 the couple won the Edgar Allan Poe Award from the Mystery Writers of America. As a solo writer he authored several plays which were staged on Broadway and multiple teleplays for American television.

== Life and career ==
William Roos was born on May 25, 1911, in Pittsburgh, Pennsylvania. He was educated at the Carnegie Institute of Technology (now Carnegie Mellon University) in his native city. There he met his wife, Audrey Kelley, and after marrying her the couple moved to New York City.

As a solo writer Roos wrote several plays under his own name, many of which were staged on Broadway; including Triple Play (1937), The Life of Reilly (1942) January Thaw (1946), Boy Wanted (1947), Peep Show (1950), and Belles On Their Toes (1952). Under the pseudonym William Rand he adapted the 1938 novel The Four of Hearts by Ellery Queen into a 1949 stage play entitled The Four of Hearts Mystery. He penned the story for the 1948 Broadway musical As the Girls Go whose plot was set in a future United States when the nation elects its first female president. He also authored the musical book for the 1951 Broadway musical Courtin' Time; collaborating with Jack Lawrence and Don Walker who co-wrote the music and lyrics. That work was itself an adaptation of Eden Phillpotts's 1916 play The Farmer's Wife. Roos also co-authored one play with his wife Audrey for Broadway, Speaking of Murder (1956).

William and Audrey Roos co-wrote more than twenty mystery novels between 1940 and 1971 under the pseudonym Kelley Roos; nine of which feature the married sleuths Jeff and Haila Troy. Their 1942 Jeff and Haila Troy mystery novel The Frightened Stiff was adapted into a film that same year; A Night to Remember starring Loretta Young and Brian Aherne. The 1960 film Scent of Mystery starring Elizabeth Taylor and Peter Lorre was adapted from their 1947 mystery novel Ghost of a Chance.

For television, Roos wrote multiple teleplays for the Kraft Television Theatre and Goodyear Television Playhouse; sometimes by himself under his own name and sometimes in collaboration with his wife under their own names or as Kelley Roos. Some of these were adaptations of his stage plays for appearance on television, and others were television adaptations of works he co-authored with his wife or works originally written by other mystery writers. As Kelley Roos, the couple adapted John Dickson Carr's 1937 mystery novel The Burning Court for NBC Television in 1961; an adaptation which won the pair the Edgar Allan Poe Award from the Mystery Writers of America.

A biographical entry in The Writers Directory 1974-76 (published 1973, St. Martin's Press) stated that William Roos and his wife lived in Edgartown, Massachusetts, on the island of Martha's Vineyard. Audrey Roos died at their home in Edgartown in 1982. William Roos died in 1987.

== Bibliography ==
- Brooks Atkinson (June 14, 1951). "At The Theatre". The New York Times. p. 30.
- Dan Dietz (2014). "1951-1952 Season: Courtin' Time". The Complete Book of 1950s Broadway Musicals. Rowman & Littlefield Publishers. pp. 77–79. ISBN 9781442235052.
- Larry James Gianakos (1980). Television Drama Series Programming: A Comprehensive Chronicle, 1947-1959, Volume 1. Scarecrow Press. ISBN 9780810813304.
- William Hawes (2001). Live Television Drama, 1946-1951. McFarland & Company. pp. 133, 239, 283, 378. ISBN 9780786409051.
- Thomas S. Hischak (2008). The Oxford Companion to the American Musical: Theatre, Film, and Television. Oxford University Press. ISBN 9780199887323.
- Amnon Kabatchnik (2010). "The Four of Hearts Mystery (1949): William Rand (United States, 1911–1987)". Blood on the Stage, 1925-1950: Milestone Plays of Crime, Mystery, and Detection, an Annotated Repertoire. Scarecrow Press. pp. 764–768. ISBN 9780810869639.
- Amnon Kabatchnik (2011). "Speaking of Murder (1956)". Blood on the Stage, 1950-1975: Milestone Plays of Crime, Mystery, and Detection. Scarecrow Press. ISBN 9780810869639.
- John M. Reiley, ed. (1980). "Roos, Kelley". Twentieth Century Crime & Mystery Writers. Palgrave Macmillan. pp. 1279–1280. ISBN 9781349813667.
- "Roos, William". The Monthly Supplement: The Supplement to Who?s Who. A Current Biographical Reference Service. Cumulatively Indexed. February 1943 to May 1943. [8 issues]. A.N. Marquis Company. 1943. p. 37.
- "Roos, William". The Writers Directory 1974-76. St. Martin's Press. 1973. p. 1274.
