= Scent of Mystery =

1960 American smell-o-vision film by Jack Cardiff

- A film poster bearing the film's new title: Holiday in Spain
- Directed by: Jack Cardiff
- Screenplay by: Gerald Kersh
- Based on: Ghost of a Chance; 1947 novel by Kelley Roos
- Produced by: Mike Todd Jr.
- Starring: Denholm Elliott; Peter Lorre; Elizabeth Taylor
- Cinematography: John von Kotze
- Edited by: James E. Newcom
- Music by: Harold Adamson; Mario Nascimbene; Jordan Ramin
- Color process: Technicolor
- Release date: January 6, 1960 (Chicago)
- Running time: 125 minutes (original cut); 102 mins (re-release)
- Country: United States
- Language: English
- Budget: $2 million
- Box office: $300,000 (US/Canada rentals)

External videos
- Holiday in Spain (trailer)

Scent of Mystery is a 1960 American mystery film directed by Jack Cardiff and starring Denholm Elliot and Peter Lorre. It was the first film to use the Smell-O-Vision system to release odors at points in the film's plot, and the first film in which aromas were integral to the story, providing important details to the audience. It was produced by Mike Todd Jr., who, in conjunction with his father Mike Todd, had produced such spectacles as This Is Cinerama (1952) and Around the World in Eighty Days (1956).

The film was later re-released in Cinerama under the title Holiday in Spain without Smell-O-Vision. In 2012, the film was restored, reconstructed and re-released by David Strohmaier. In 2015, a version complete with reconstructed scents was presented at screenings in Los Angeles, Denmark and England.

Cardiff called it the "one film I want to erase from my memory. The reason for this is that, through no fault of my own, the film was a complete disaster."

== Plot ==
A mystery novelist discovers a plan to murder an American heiress while on vacation in Spain. He enlists the help of a taxi driver to travel across the Spanish countryside in order to thwart the crime.

== Cast ==
- Denholm Elliott as Oliver Larker
- Peter Lorre as Smiley
- Beverly Bentley as The decoy Sally Kennedy
- Paul Lukas as Baron Saradin
- Liam Redmond as Johnny Gin
- Leo McKern as Tommy Kennedy
- Peter Arne as Robert Fleming
- Mary Laura Wood as Margharita
- Diana Dors as Winifred Jordan
- Judith Furse as Miss Leonard
- Maurice Marsac as Pepi
- Michael Trubshawe as English aviator
- Juan Olaguivel as truck driver
- Billie Miller as Constance Walker
- Elizabeth Taylor as The Woman of Mystery (uncredited cameo)

== Ghost of a Chance ==
The screenplay was adapted from the 1947 novel Ghost of a Chance by Kelley Roos, the pen name of husband-and-wife mystery writers Audrey Kelley and William Roos. The novel was set in locations in New York City and was about a husband and wife investigating a possible murder of a woman about whose existence they are unsure.

Kelley Roos also wrote a 1959 paperback novelization of the screenplay, reset in Spain. Anthony Boucher of The New York Times wrote that "unlike almost all other film adaptations, it's a highly entertaining book – so light and bright and gay in its wild adventure in southern Spain that you never care whether it makes much sense or not."

== Production ==
During production, the film was titled The Chase Is On.

For the film's director, Todd Jr. chose Jack Cardiff, a leading cinematographer whom Todd Sr. had wanted to shoot the never-filmed Don Quixote and who had just made his directorial debut with Sons and Lovers (1960). Cardiff later said that "using smells in a film was also an ambition I had had for years."

=== Casting ===
Cardiff says that he recommended Peter Sellers to play the lead role, but a nervous Sellers made a poor impression on Todd during a lunch meeting. The lead instead went to Denholm Elliott.

=== Filming ===
Filming started April 1959 near Barcelona, and took three months. The film was shot entirely in Spain and involved traveling 100,000 km (62,000 mi). It was filmed in color using the Todd-AO process. Locations included Granada (including Alhambra), Guadix, Ronda (Puente Viejo), Seville (San Telmo Bridge, Plaza de España), El Chorro (Caminito del Rey), Córdoba (Mosque), Madrid, Barcelona, Pamplona, Segovia (aqueduct and alcázar), and Málaga (Cathedral and Castle of Gibralfaro).

Filmink argued that Beverly Bentley's role should have been played by Diana Dors, who instead had a cameo. Bentley was a television actress from Atlanta whom Todd had discovered.

In May, Peter Lorre suffered a heart attack while filming near Granada. Cardiff says that a double was then employed for most of Lorre's subsequent scenes.

Cardiff said "Shooting the film was exciting and we were all convinced we had a great movie." However, halfway through filming, he asked Todd if he had experienced the Smell-O-Vision effect, but Todd had not, so samples were sent to them by Dr. Laube, the inventor of the process. "It's hard to believe but each labelled glass smelled exactly the same as the others – like a very cheap eau de cologne," said Cardiff. "It was such a sad thing that the film was made...as integral part of the film was of course the use of smells, and it didn't come off because the smells were nothing. They were a fake."

Todd said "we want to make a good picture with laughs, entertainment and thrills – and we hope it will be received with critical approval. Already our film has been referred to as the original smellodrama and the first picture that smells. But no matter what we call the process we are pioneers, and its got to be good or the boys will take full advantage of the connotation. I hope it is the kind of picture they call a scent-sation."

=== Smell technology ===
According to the Los Angeles Times in 1954, Mike Todd Sr. was introduced to the Smell-O-Vision process, which enabled certain odors to be released into a theater during a screening. Todd was enthusiastic about the process, which was invented by a Swiss professor named Hans Laube (1900–76). Laube had demonstrated the concept at the 1939 New York World's Fair.

Todd Sr. considered incorporating it into Around the World in Eighty Days but decided against it. When Todd died, his son decided to use Laube's process in a film that would incorporate the sense of smell into the actual storytelling process.

Some scenes were designed to highlight Smell-O-Vision's capabilities. In one, wine casks fall off a wagon and roll down a hill, smashing against a wall, at which point a grape scent was released. Other scenes were accompanied by aromas that revealed key points to the audience. For example, the assassin was identified by the smell of a smoking pipe.

==== Scents used in the film ====
- Pipe tobacco: Smoked by the villain
- Coffee
- Roses
- Wine
- Gunpowder
- Peppermint
- Shoe polish
- Gasoline
- Perfume: The method to identify the girl whose life is in danger
- Flowers
- Brandy
- Fresh sea air
- Peaches
- Bananas
- Wood shavings

== Release ==
The film opened at the Cinestage Theatre in Chicago on January 6, 1960. It opened at the Fox Ritz Theatre in Los Angeles on January 25 and at the Warner Theatre in New York City on February 18, 1960. Costs of the Smell-O-Vision system were high. It took an estimated $25 to $30 per seat to install and use Smell-O-Vision at a time when a movie tickets cost less than $1.

Ads for the film proclaimed: "First they moved (1895)! Then they talked (1927)! Now they smell!" Producer Mike Todd, who was a bit of a showman, engaged in such hyperbole, saying, "I hope it's the kind of picture they call a scentsation!" He also got help from newspaper columnists such as Earl Wilson, who lauded the system, claiming that Smell-O-Vision "can produce anything from skunk to perfume, and remove it instantly." The New York Times writer Richard Nason believed that it was a major advance in filmmaking. As such, expectations for the film were great.

=== Holiday in Spain ===
The film was retitled as Holiday in Spain and re-released, but without the odors, by Cinerama, which needed new products for its specially equipped theaters. The film was converted into three-strip prints that could be exhibited on the very wide, deeply curved screens in the special theaters. However, having been converted from Smell-O-Vision, as The Daily Telegraph described it, "the film acquired a baffling, almost surreal quality, since there was no reason why, for example, a loaf of bread should be lifted from the oven and thrust into the camera for what seemed to be an unconscionably long time."

=== Television ===
Scent of Mystery was aired once on television by MTV and syndicated on local TV stations in the 1980s. A convenience-store promotion, similar to that for the movie Polyester, offered scratch-and-sniff cards for viewers to recreate the theater experience.

=== Restoration ===
In 2012, Holiday in Spain was completely restored and digitally reconstructed by film editor and Cinerama restoration specialist David Strohmaier. Only portions of the original camera negative remained in usable condition, so the remaining parts of the film were reconstructed from two archival 70-mm Eastmancolor prints. Not enough of the deleted footage from the original Scent of Mystery was recovered to be able to restore that version as well. The newly restored film was released on Blu-ray in 2014 by Screen Archives.

In 2015, Australian film producer Tammy Burnstock and artist and scent creator Saskia Wilson-Brown revived the Smell-O-Vision experience, presenting Strohmaier's restored film at screenings in Los Angeles, Denmark and England. The only information about the scents used in the original production was a list with entries such as "happy odor of baking bread" and "the faint smell of a yellow rose." Without any perfumers' or chemists' specifications, Wilson-Brown recreated the film's smells from scratch by blending possible aroma ingredients.

== Reception ==
The Smell-O-Vision mechanism did not work well. According to Hy Hollinger of Variety, aromas were released with a distracting hissing noise, and audience members in the balcony complained that the scents reached them several seconds after the action was shown on the screen. In other parts of the theater, the odors were too faint, causing audience members to sniff loudly in an attempt to catch the scents.

Cardiff recalled that the Chicago screening worked well: "Exactly on cue you'd get the whiff of the smell coming up from the seat in front of you, so you'd smell it", adding that the "press and everybody, they all said the same thing: there is no particular smell about anything. It was all a kind of cheap eau de cologne. This was a disaster. And then later on we ran it in New York, and that was the end of that because it had terrible notices because it was not a genuine Smell-O-Vision at all. It was a very interesting story with a marvellous photographic background of Spain, but the smell, for which it was made, didn't exist."

The daughter of Smell-O-Vision inventor Hans Laube's later claimed that the technology used at these screenings was different from what her father had envisioned. She wrote, "The producers realized they could save a fortune if they air-conditioned the scents in rather than install the elegant, costly little units in front of each theatre seat. Hans's concept was, install the scent emitters in front of a certain number of seats. Send the scent; send some neutralizer. Personalized. Tidy and elegant. (And apparently, costly.) So very late in the game, one of the producers decided they could make much more $ by using the air conditioner to waft in the scents. And, screw the neutralizer. So the film became known as Mike Todd Jr's only Stinker."

Technical adjustments by Smell-O-Vision's manufacturers solved these problems, but by then it was too late. Negative reviews, in conjunction with word of mouth, caused the film to fail miserably.

Todd later said that his press agent Bill Doll "had an idea that would have saved the damned thing if we'd thought of it before the film opened. And that was to reverse the pump. It sucked air back, so that there was no overhang on the previous smell. Otherwise it just sort of drifted in between smells. It wasn't over powering, but just enough not to make the clearest delineation. Bill got this idea after the third opening. It was used, and it worked perfectly, but by that time the ship had sailed."

=== Critical reception ===
Hy Hollinger of Variety wrote that the film "has many elements that are derivative of a Hitchcock chase film, the late Mike Todd's Around the World in Eighty Days, and the Cinerama travelogue technique...The travelog is neatly integrated as part of the chase."

Bosley Crowther of The New York Times wrote:

As theatrical exhibitionism, it is gaudy, sprawling and full of sound. But as an attempt at a considerable motion picture it has to be classified as bunk...It is an artless, loose-jointed "chase" picture...Whatever novel stimulation it might afford with the projection of smells appears to be dubious and dependent upon the noses of the individual viewers and the smell-projector's whims...Indistinct is the right word for the whole silly plot of the film and the casual, confused performance of it, which is virtually amateur. Except for the job of Peter Lorre...the acting is downright atrocious.

The Los Angeles Times called the film "good family entertainment and while it is doubtful whether the smellies are here to stay you'll find this one worth a look...and smell."

Comedian Henny Youngman quipped "I didn't understand the picture. I had a cold."

The Monthly Film Bulletin, reviewing the Holiday in Spain version of the film, wrote: "Originally presented complete with the smells of Spain, and now deodorised to leave the characters still doing an unconscionable amount of sniffing, this is a thin thriller-charade offering little in the way of either amusement or excitement. Peter Lorre makes an affable appearance as the meter-conscious, cowardly-but-game taxi-driver; otherwise the film is mainly an excuse to use the large screen for travelogue views around Spain – which are spectacular enough if you like that sort of thing."

=== Box office ===
In its first five shows in Chicago, the film grossed $12,000. It went on to earn only $300,000 in theatrical rentals in the United States and Canada. Todd later said that he felt that the idea "was just a novelty gimmick. Maybe, if it was a gigantic hit, you might make a second film, and at the most, a third, but that would have been it."

Todd did not produce another film until 1979's The Bell Jar, which was also his last film.

== Soundtrack ==
The Scent of Mystery soundtrack was released on CD in 2008 on the Kritzerland label. It features a score composed by Mario Nascimbene and Jordan Ramin, including two songs from the film sung by Eddie Fisher. The CD was later repackaged with the 2014 Blu-ray release of Holiday in Spain.

== Rival film ==
Scent of Mystery was not the only attempt to combine cinema and smell. The AromaRama system, which released scents through the air conditioning system of a theater, was first used for the travelogue Behind the Great Wall in December 1959.

== See also ==
- Polyester
