= Baksı Museum =

Museum in Bayburt, Turkey

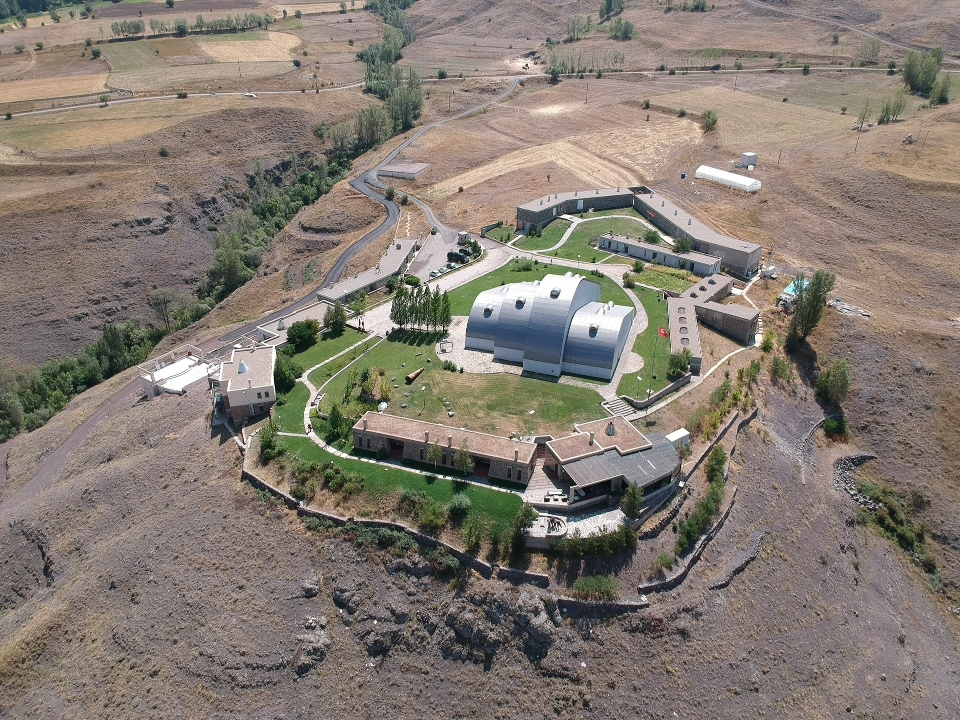
- Baksı Museum
- Established: 2005; 21 years ago
- Location: Bayraktar, Bayburt Bayburt Turkey
- Coordinates: 40°23′8″N 40°33′59″E
- Type: Contemporary art
- President: Hüsamettin Koçan
- Curators: Baksı Culture and Art Foundation
- Parking: Available
- Website: baksi.org/en/anasayfa

Baksı Museum is a museum located in Bayburt, Turkey. “Baksı” literally means “healer, helper, protector” in Turkic languages. The museum offers contemporary art and traditional handcrafts. The basic aim of the foundation is, as quoted by founder Professor Hüsamettin Koçan, to "disseminate art and culture by bringing together contemporary and traditional art, to collect, document, classify, preserve and promote works of contemporary and traditional art, to use this base in realizing creation, and to hand local and national cultural values down to future generations".

== Themes ==
The themes behind of yearly exhibitions, workshops and other events are notable. These are reflects aim of the museum. These themes are Travel, Traditional and contemporary art, Woman, Cultural Sustainability, Children.

== Exhibitions ==
- Vuslat Emanet, May–November 2023
- AŞİNA ŞAKİR GÖKÇEBAĞ, September 2019-July 2020
- Nuri Bilge Ceylan, May–August 2019
- Earth, June–October 2018
- The Thorn On My Foot, May–November 2017
- Scent of Baksı, a multisensory installation by Ahmet Yiğider that transformed the story of the museum into an olfactory experience October 2016.
- ON, August 15
- The Sculptured Road To Miro, August 2014
- Distance and Contact, August 2012
- Custom and Art, October 2010

=== Preparation Stage Exhibitions ===
- Shaman's Diary March - April 2004
- Charmed Hands 2, December - January 2003
- Charmed Hands, 2000-2002 (Bilgi University's Art Space Information Workshop 111)

== History ==
The main building of the museum was completed in 2010 after a tough adventure without any financial assistance from the state. The presentation of the Baksı Museum was held in Istanbul Modern in June 2010 and the opening was in July. In 2012, the Warehouse Museum, the new exhibition hall of the museum, met with art lovers.

== Workshops ==
- Ehram and Rug Workshop
- Contemporary Art Workshop

== Activities ==
- YGA Social Innovation Camp was held at the Baksı Museum 20 July 2017
- Yoga at Baksı Museum 8 June 2017
- Baksı Student Art Festivals

== Areas ==
Exhibition halls, warehouse museum, workshops, conference hall, library and guest house, Baksı Museum is spreading in a land of 40 acres.

== Awards ==
- Elle Style Awards 2015
- Council of Europe Museum Prize, 2014
- Kuduaka 2014
- Çagsav Corporate Honorary Award 2011
- T.B.M.M. Honor Award 2011
- Tuyap Art-Lover Institution Award, 2010
- Contemporary Istanbul, 2010
- Golden Compass, 2010

== See also ==
- Bayburt
