= Dangerous Blondes =

1943 film by Leigh Jason

- Directed by: Leigh Jason
- Screenplay by: Richard Flournoy; Jack Henley
- Story by: Kelley Roos
- Produced by: Samuel Bischoff
- Starring: Evelyn Keyes; Anita Louise; Allyn Joslyn
- Cinematography: Philip Tannura
- Edited by: Jerome Thoms
- Music by: Earl E. Lawrence (uncredited)
- Production company: Columbia Pictures
- Distributed by: Columbia Pictures
- Release date: 23 September 1943
- Running time: 81 minutes
- Country: United States
- Language: English

Dangerous Blondes is a 1943 American comedy film directed by Leigh Jason and written by Richard Flournoy and Jack Henley, from the story If the Shroud Fits by Kelley Roos. The film stars Allyn Joslyn and Evelyn Keyes, and was released by Columbia Pictures in September 1943. Alternate titles for this film were Reckless Lady and The Case of the Dangerous Blondes. A review in Vanity Fair review characterized the film as a "laugh-packed session here via the antics of Allyn Joslyn and Evelyn Keyes.". This was Dwight Frye's final film.

== Plot ==
Barry Craig, a crime fiction writer, and his wife Jane are approached by Jane's friend, Julie Taylor. Julie works for fashion photographer Ralph McCormick, and she believes the studio is being stalked by a murderer. Soon after, a wealthy socialite, Isabel Fleming, is murdered during a photo session. The police become involved and the investigation takes its course.

== Cast ==
- Allyn Joslyn as Barry Craig
- Evelyn Keyes as Jane Craig
- Edmund Lowe as Ralph McCormick
- John Hubbard as Kirk Fenley
- Anita Louise as Julie Taylor
- Frank Craven as Inspector Joseph Clinton
- Michael Duane as Harry Duerr
- Ann Savage as Erika McCormick
- William Demarest as Detective Gatling
- Hobart Cavanaugh as Edward E. 'Pop' Philpot
- Frank Sully as Detective Joe Henderson
- Robert Stanford as Jim Snyder
- Lynn Merrick as May Ralston
- Mary Forbes as Isabel Fleming (uncredited)
- Emory Parnell as Officer McGuire (uncredited)
