= A Night to Remember (1942 film) =

Film by Richard Wallace

- Video cover
- Directed by: Richard Wallace
- Screenplay by: Richard Fluornoy; Jack Henley
- Based on: The Frightened Stiff; 1942 novel by Kelley Roos
- Produced by: Samuel Bischoff
- Starring: Loretta Young; Brian Aherne
- Cinematography: Joseph Walker
- Edited by: Charles Nelson
- Music by: Werner R. Heymann
- Distributed by: Columbia Pictures
- Release date: December 10, 1942
- Running time: 85–91 minutes
- Country: United States
- Language: English

A Night to Remember is a 1942 American comedy mystery film starring Loretta Young and Brian Aherne. It was directed by Richard Wallace, and is based on the 1942 novel The Frightened Stiff by Kelley Roos. The film follows a mystery writer and his wife who try to solve a murder when a corpse is found outside their Greenwich Village apartment.

== Plot ==
Nancy (Loretta Young) and Jeff Troy (Brian Aherne) move into a somber-looking basement apartment building on 13 Gay Street, Greenwich Village, where the residents all act very strangely. Nancy recognizes one of the residents, Anne Carstairs (Jeff Donnell), who acts very oddly and not at all the way Nancy remembers her. While eating in a nearby restaurant named Polly's Stable, Nancy overhears a man, later identified as Louis Kaufman, talking on the telephone telling someone to meet him in the basement apartment. Louis goes to the basement apartment and is later found dead in the backyard. from evidence it seems he had been drowned in the apartment's bathtub.

Jeff recognizes the basement apartment as a former speakeasy and reunites with the mascot of the old bar, a box turtle called "Old Hickory". The turtle's peregrinations in the building cause a series of scares and frights. Jeff and Nancy figure out that all the residents were being blackmailed by a man named Andrew Bruhl, who used to be a private investigator. Bruhl made all the blackmail victims live in the building at 13 Gay Street to keep an eye on them.

Jeff and Nancy figure out that Bruhl killed Kaufman, and that Bruhl is someone who lives in the building. The suspects are Anne Carstairs (Jeff Donnell); her husband, Scott Carstairs (William Wright); Eddie Turner, the landlord; Polly Franklin (Lee Patrick), who owns Polly's Stable; Lingle (Richard Gaines), another resident; and the housekeeper, Mrs. Salter (Blanche Yurka).

== Cast ==
- Loretta Young as Nancy Troy
- Brian Aherne as Jeff Troy
- Jeff Donnell as Anne Carstairs
- William Wright as Scott Carstairs
- Sidney Toler as Inspector Hankins
- Gale Sondergaard as Mrs. Devoe
- Donald MacBride as Bolling
- Lee Patrick as Polly Franklin
- Don Costello as Eddie Turner
- Blanche Yurka as Mrs. Salter
- Richard Gaines as Lingle
- James Burke as Pat Murphy

== Critical response ==
Film critic Bosley Crowther wrote in The New York Times in 1943 that the film's "plot is tedious and involved" and "the film is largely a succession of looming shadows, conversations and mediocre gags and people creeping out of the darkness and saying "Boo!" Writing in DVD Talk, Jamie S. Rich described the film as "not as memorable as its title would have you believe," and although the "plot doesn't really add up to very much, Young is a joy to watch and it's all so light and fluffy, A Night to Remember ends up being pretty hard to hate."

== Radio ==
The movie was adapted for Australian radio in 1946 with Ron Randell and Muriel Steinbeck.
