= Brian Goeltzenleuchter =

American olfactory artist (born 1976)

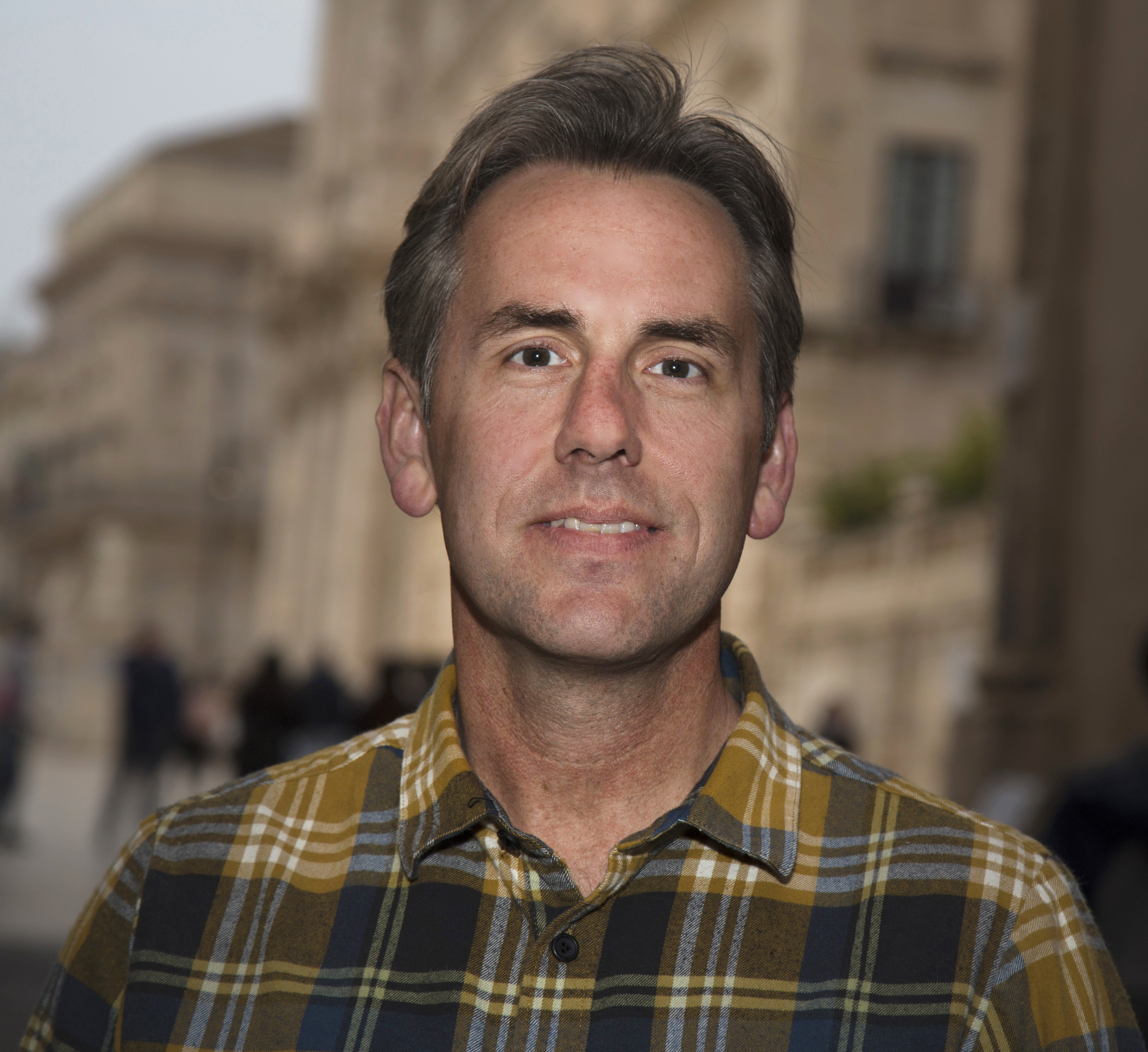
- Born: June 26, 1976 (age 50)
- Known for: olfactory art, social practice, conceptual art

Brian Goeltzenleuchter is an American conceptual artist and educator who works in olfactory art, social practice, and image making.

== Early life and education ==
Goeltzenleuchter was born in San Diego, California. In 2001 he received a Masters of Fine Arts from the University of California San Diego where he studied under David Antin and Allan Kaprow.

== Art ==
Goeltzenleuchter's work has been exhibited at multiple locations such as The Institute for Art and Olfaction, The Walters Art Museum, The Banff Centre, Städtische Galerie Bremen, and the Institute of Contemporary Art, Los Angeles. In his artwork Goeltzenleuchter tries to "explore the dynamics between individuals and the cities and institutions which shape those relationships" through attempts to interpret public places such as crowded cities like Los Angeles.

== Awards ==
- Creative Catalyst Award (2014, won for the Olfactory Memoirs workshops)
- Park Social (2021, won for The Olfactory Present: By Means of Smoke)

== Creative works ==
=== Art ===
- Sillage
  - 2014, Institute of Contemporary Art, Los Angeles
  - 2016, The Walters Art Museum, Baltimore, MD
- Volatile!
  - 2016, The Poetry Foundation, Chicago, IL
- Odophonics
  - 2016, San Diego Art Institute, San Diego, CA
- Scents of Exile
  - 2021, Olfactory Art Keller Gallery, New York, NY
  - 2021, Städtische Galerie Bremen, Kunsthalle Bremen, Paula Modersohn-Becker Museum, Germany
  - 2022, Art Gallery of Alberta, Canada

=== Literature ===
- "Scenting the Antiseptic Institution", in Designing with Smell, (2017, London: Routledge, ed. Victoria Henshaw)
- “The olfactory counter-monument: Active smelling and the politics of wonder in the contemporary museum", in Olfactory Art and the Political in an Age of Resistance, (2021, London: Routledge, eds. Gwenn-Aël Lynn and Debra Riley Parr)
