= Gustatory technology =

Engineering discipline dealing with gustatory representation

Gustatory technology is the engineering discipline dealing with gustatory representation.

== Description ==
Virtual taste refers to a taste experience generated by a digital taste simulator. Electrodes are used to simulate the taste and feel of real food in the mouth. In 2012, Dr. Nimesha Ranasinghe and a team of researchers at the National University of Singapore developed the digital lollipop, an electronic device capable of transmitting four major taste sensations (salty, sour, sweet and bitter) to the tongue. In 2016 the same team created a square with thermoelectric elements to simulate the sensation of sweetness through changes in temperature. If this system is implemented in mugs or drinking glasses, it could make low-sugar drinks taste sweeter helping people reduce sugar intake. A team from the University of Tokyo created a device that simulates the different textures of food through electricity. The device uses electrodes place on the masseter muscle (a jaw muscle used for chewing) and simulates the texture by changing this muscle frequency. For example, a higher frequency gives the food a harder texture.
