= Ahmet Yiğider =

Turkish artist

- Born: 1984 (age 41–42); Artvin, Turkey
- Education: Yıldız Technical University; Istanbul Technical University
- Occupations: Interdisciplinary artist, sculptor
- Known for: Sculpture, conceptual art, olfactory art
- Website: Official website

Ahmet Yiğider (born 1984, Artvin) is an Istanbul-based interdisciplinary Turkish artist known for his sculpture and conceptual art, which often explores the sense of smell and sensory experiences.

== Education ==
Yiğider was trained in industrial engineering at Yıldız Technical University and holds a master's degree in design from Istanbul Technical University's Faculty of Architecture.

== Career ==
Yiğider has exhibited both public and gallery works, such as Ant’s Nest at CerModern, a walk-through spiral sculpture infused with ant scent and a sound installation, Intellect at Moscow’s Gallery Fine Art, featuring sculptures, and the Massence Project (as the curator and contributing artist), uniting 29 artists from 15 countries.

His Detractive Anatomies series distills organic forms to their essence, while academic projects like Carrying Scent Beyond Time explore olfaction in art. He was a finalist in the İGA ART competition. He exhibited his work at the International Çanakkale Biennial.

In 2026, Yiğider presented the exhibition TÖZ / Substance in collaboration with Ali Artun at the Galata Greek School in Istanbul, exploring the pre-rational dimensions of architecture and the origins of form.

In October 2016, Yiğider presented Scent of Baksı at the Baksı Museum, a multisensory installation that reinterpreted the museum’s story through scent. He became the youngest artist-educator invited to Baksı Museum’s Utopia Workshops.

== Recognition and critical reception ==
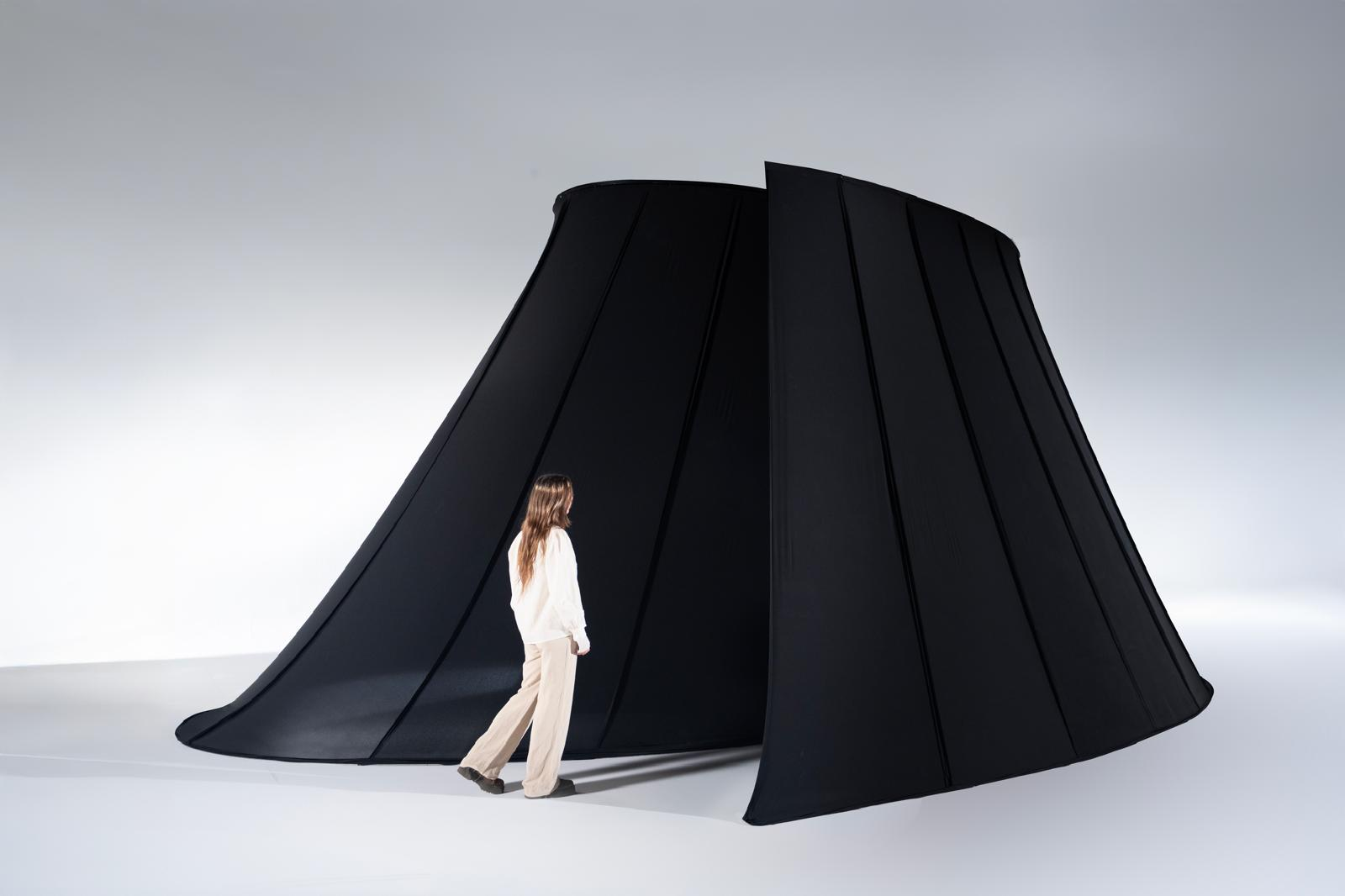
Ant Nest by Ahmet Yiğider

Yiğider’s work has been noted in both national and international art contexts. British curator and writer Alistair Hicks described his installation Karınca Yuvası (Ant Nest, 2025) as “a sensorial spiral that redefines how sculpture can materialize collective experience,” highlighting its innovative use of scent and sound.

His 2021 solo exhibition Intellect at Gallery Fine Art in Moscow was reviewed in the Turkish daily newspaper Daily Sabah, which emphasized his attempt to “open up to the world” by materializing thought in sculptural form.

At the 9th International Çanakkale Biennial (2024), his installation Fig, Human, Soil was presented as part of the event’s focus on ecological and cultural memory, positioning him among contemporary artists exploring multisensory practices in environmental art.
