= Roman Kaiser =

Swiss chemist

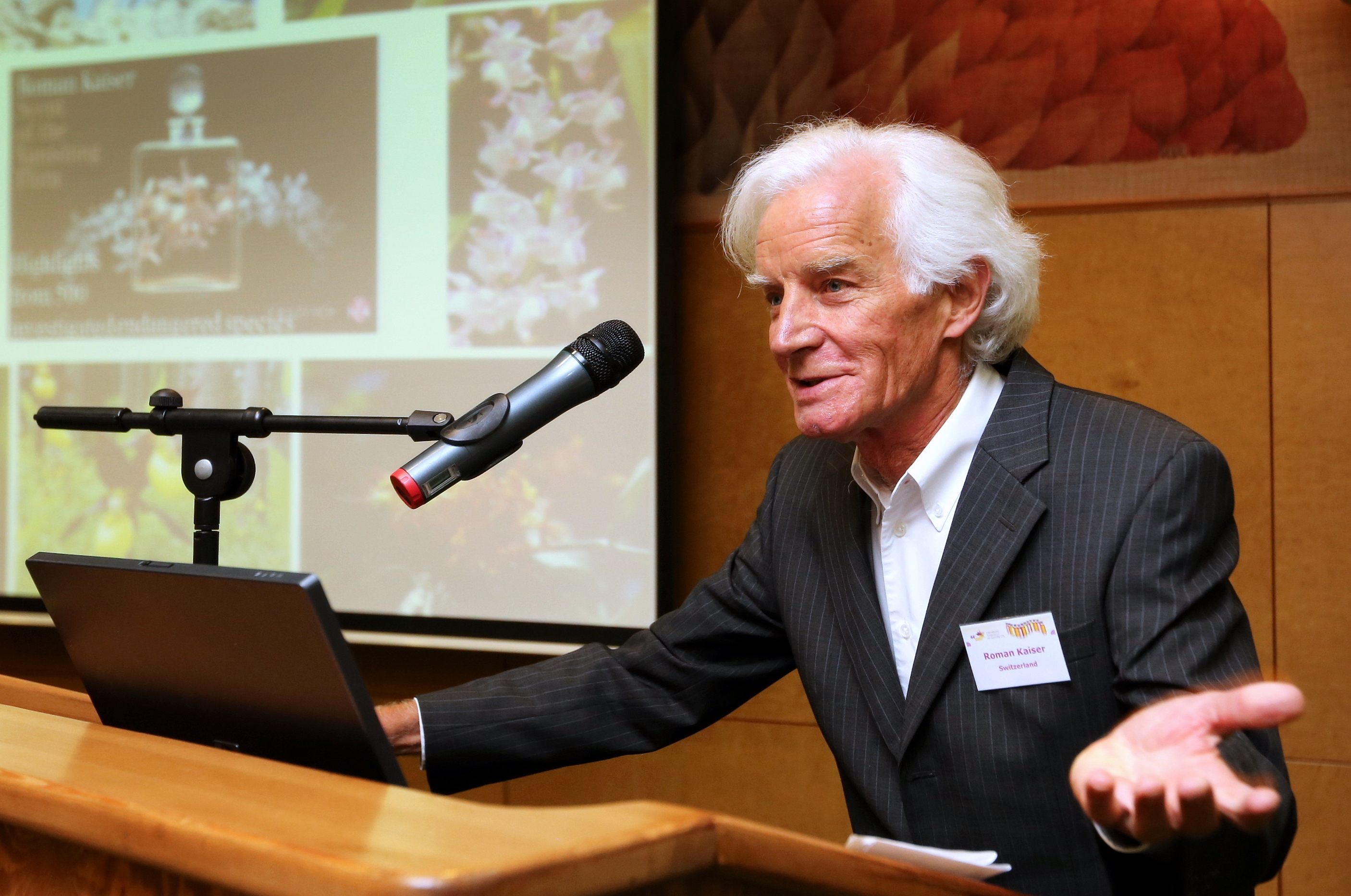
Roman Kaiser, 44th International Symposium on Essential Oils 2013, Budapest

Roman Kaiser (born in Kirchberg SG on 15 July 1945) is a Swiss fragrance chemist. Since 1968 he has been working at Givaudan, the world's largest company in the flavour and fragrance industry, where he analyzes and reconstitutes natural scents for use in perfumery using the headspace technology which he pioneered and which as a new concept made significant impact on the analysis of natural products.

== Career ==
Following his chemistry studies at the Zurich University of Applied Sciences he joined the research center of Givaudan in Dübendorf near Zürich in 1968, and since then has been working as a fragrance chemist in this company. His main research activity centers around the study and the reconstitution of the scents of nature, and the search for as well as the synthesis of new odorants isolated from nature. For this purpose, he has since 1975 applied the headspace technology which leaves the plant and its flowers intact by analyzing the surrounding air with the help of gas chromatography. He is considered one of the pioneers of this method, and many of the accords reconstituted by him have found use in internationally renowned fragrances. In recognition of his many scientific contributions, he received an honorary degree from the ETH Zurich in November 1995. His recent work was more focussed on the plants of the canopy and understory layers of tropical rainforests, and on the reconstitution of scents of endangered plant species.

== Publications ==
The results of his research have been documented in over 30 research articles in academic journals, and led to about 25 patents. He has so far also published 2 books, a third book on “Vanishing Flora – Lost Chemistry” is upcoming:

- R. Kaiser, The Scent of Orchids – Olfactory and Chemical Investigations, Elsvier, Amsterdam, 1993, ISBN 978-0-444-89841-8, 260 pages (incl. biographical sketch, English).
- R. Kaiser, Meaningful Scents around the World. Olfactory, Chemical, Biological and Cultural Considerations, Verlag Helvetica Chimica Acta, Zürich, and WILEY-VCH, Weinheim, 2006, ISBN 978-3-906390-37-6, 304 pages.
- R. Kaiser, Scent of the Vanishing Flora, Verlag Helvetica Chimica Acta, Zürich, and Wiley-VCH, Weinheim, November 2010, ISBN 978-3-906390-64-2, 400 pages.

== See also ==
- Scentography
