= Close Relations (1933 film) =

1933 film

- Directed by: Ray McCarey
- Written by: Jack Henley; Glen Lambert
- Produced by: Samuel Sax
- Starring: Fatty Arbuckle
- Production company: Warner Bros.
- Distributed by: Warner Bros.
- Release date: September 30, 1933
- Running time: 20 minutes
- Country: United States
- Language: English

Close Relations is a 1933 American Pre-Code comedy film starring Fatty Arbuckle, released a few months after his death in June 1933. This film features Shemp Howard of The Three Stooges in a non-speaking role.

== Cast ==
- Roscoe "Fatty" Arbuckle as Wilbur Wart
- Harry Shannon as Harry Wart
- Charles Judels as Uncle Ezra Wart
- Hugh O'Connell as Doctor Carver
- Mildred Van Dorn as The Nurse
- Shemp Howard as One of the Moles

== See also ==
- List of American films of 1933
