= Mike Todd Jr. =

American film producer (1929–2002)

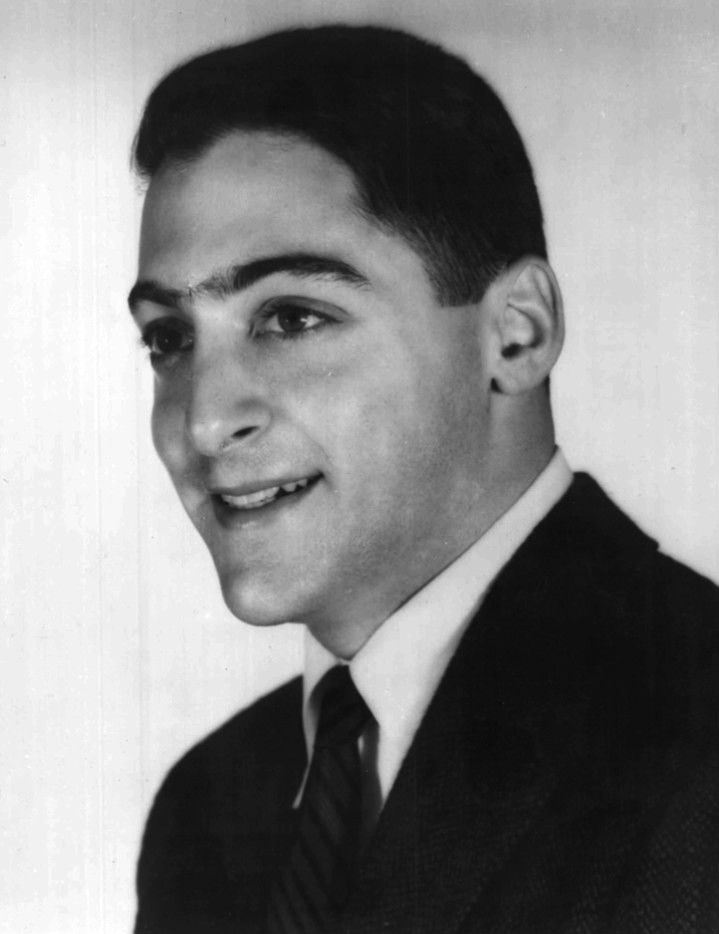
- In 1958.
- Born: October 8, 1929; Los Angeles, California
- Died: May 5, 2002 (aged 72); County Carlow, Ireland
- Spouses: Sarah Jane Weaver (m. 1953; died 1972) Susan McCarthy (m. 1972)
- Children: 8

Michael Henry Todd Jr. (October 8, 1929 – May 5, 2002) was an American film producer. He was involved in innovations such as the movie format Smell-o-vision, and the production of a racially-integrated minstrel show for the 1964 World's Fair.

== Early life ==
Todd was born to movie producer and cinema pioneer Mike Todd and his first wife, Bertha Freshman Todd. He was also a stepson of Elizabeth Taylor even though he was older than his famous stepmother through his father's third marriage.

== Career ==
Todd was vice president of his father's company, Cinerama, and was responsible for filming the famous roller-coaster scene from the company's debut film, This is Cinerama (1952). He is also known for introducing the short-lived movie format Smell-o-vision, used in the 1960 film Scent of Mystery, which he produced. It was re-released as Holiday in Spain without smells.

External videos
- "Mae Barnes, Lola Falana, Louis Gossett Jr, America Be Seated, 1964 World's Fair", Ed Sullivan Show
- "Holiday in Spain (trailer)"

Following in his father's footsteps of producing attractions for World's Fairs, Todd Jr. produced a racially integrated minstrel show for the 1964 New York World's Fair, called "America, Be Seated". It closed after two performances.

== Personal life and death ==
Todd was first married [1953–1972] to Sarah Jane Weaver, and they had six children: Cyrus, Susan, Sarah, Eliza Haselton, Daniel, and Oliver Todd. Later, then married [1972–2002] to Susan McCarthy, Todd had two more children: Del and James.

In 1983, Todd and his wife Susan McCarthy wrote a biography of Todd Sr. called A Valuable Property: The Life Story of Michael Todd. (ISBN 0-87795-491-7)

On May 5, 2002, Michael Todd died in Ireland of lung cancer, at the age of 72, with all of his children and his second wife surviving him.
