= Alistair Hicks =

British writer and art curator (born 1956)

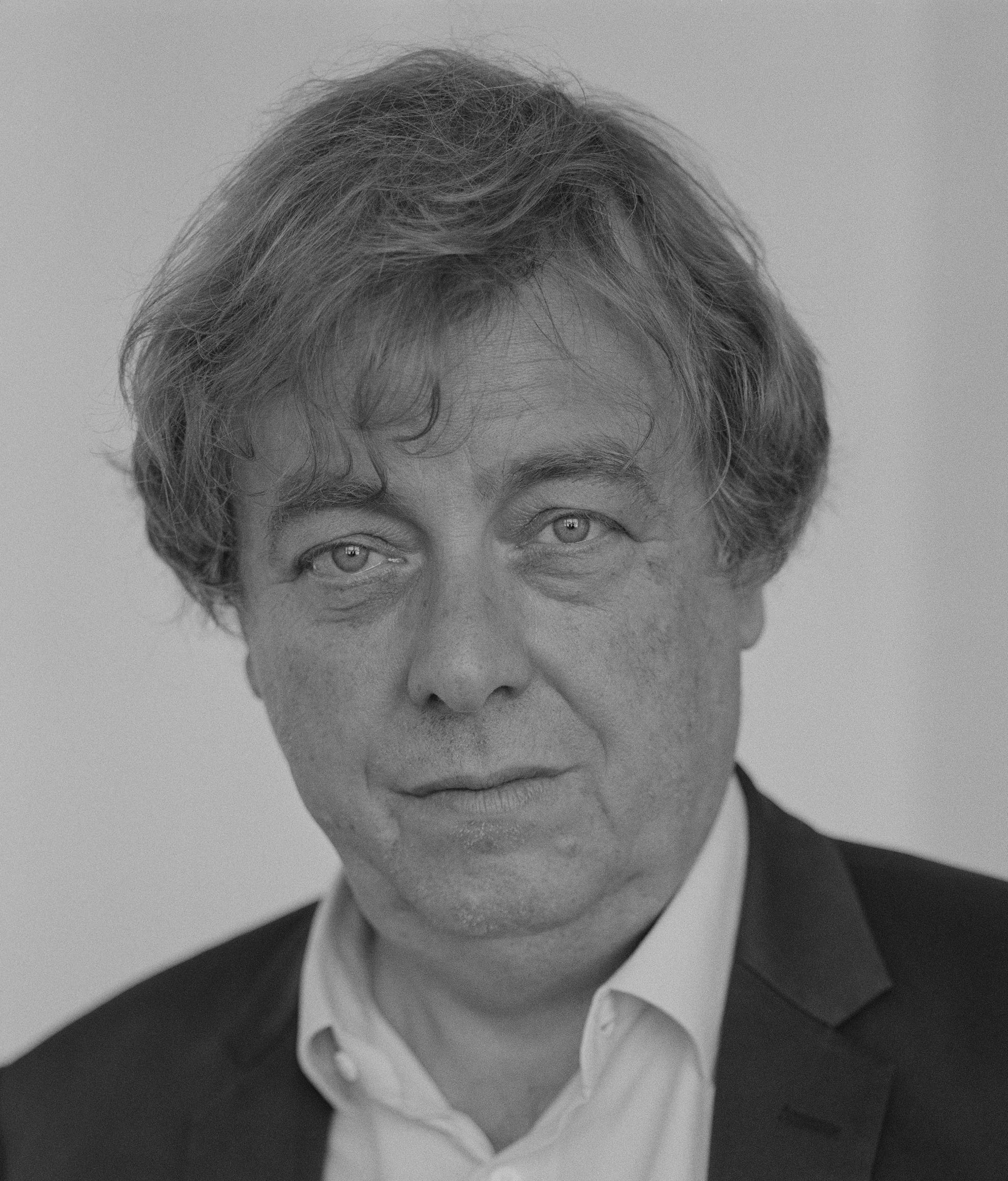
- Hicks in 2016
- Born: 1 August 1956 (age 69); London, England
- Education: Eton College
- Alma mater: University of St Andrews; Emory University
- Occupations: Writer, curator
- Known for: The Global Art Compass, Deutsche Bank
- Website: facebook.com/art.compass.1/

Alistair Hicks (born 1 August 1956) is a writer and art curator. He was senior curator at Deutsche Bank for 20 years and is an international curator.

== Life and work ==
=== Education ===
Hicks was educated at Eton College, and subsequently at the University of St Andrews, Scotland, graduating in 1978 with an Art History MA. Hicks then continued to study at Emory University, Georgia, US to read Art and Business as a Robert T. Jones Scholar.

=== Career ===
Hicks is the author of The Global Art Compass: New Directions in 21st Century Art, a survey of 21st century art. Hicks has curated several exhibitions, including Raymond Pettibon and Marko Maetamm at Kumu, Art Museum of Estonia and of the Moscow Conceptualist Nikita Alexeev at Narrative Projects in London. Hicks is author of several publications on contemporary art, including The School of London, New British Art in the Saatchi Collection and Art Works: Deutsche Bank Collection Group Head Office, Frankfurt.

Hicks writes as a critic and commentator for The Financial Times, Apollo Magazine and Frieze Magazine. He was a contributor to The Spectator, Vogue and The Times.

- Christie's Auction House, 1981–1982
- Antiques Across the World, editor, 1982–1985
- Antique, editor, 1985–1996
- Deutsche Bank, 1996–2016

== Personal life ==
Hicks lives in London with his wife and has two daughters.

== List of Publications ==
1989	The School of London, Phaidon Press
1989	New British Art in the Saatchi Collection, Thames & Hudson
1996	Contemporary Art at Deutsche Bank, London, Deutsche Bank
2000	Art Works British and German Contemporary Art: 1960–2000, Merrell Publishing and Deutsche Bank
2011	Art Works: Deutsche Bank Collection, Group Head Office Frankfurt, Hatje Kantz
2014	The Global Art Compass: New Directions in 21st Century Art, Thames & Hudson
2015	The Global Art Compass: New Directions in 21st Century Art, Turkish Edition, Yapi Kredi'
