= ACM/IEEE Virtual Reality International Conference =

- Abbreviation: VRIC
- Discipline: Virtual reality

Publication details
- Publisher: ACM
- Frequency: annual

The ACM Virtual Reality International Conference (VRIC) is an annual conference on virtual reality organized by the Association for Computing Machinery. Papers are on a variety of topics, such as mixed reality, human-computer interaction, 3D interaction evaluation, and image analysis. Its proceedings are published in the ACM Digital Library. It is hosted and sponsored by ACM SIGGRAPH, Association française de réalité virtuelle, and Laval Virtual in city of Laval, France.
