= Headspace technology =

Technique of gas chromatography

Headspace technology is a technique developed in the 1980s to elucidate the odor compounds present in the air surrounding various objects. Usually the objects of interest are odoriferous objects such as plants, flowers and foods. Similar techniques are also used to analyze the interesting scents of locations and environments such as tea shops and saw mills. After the data is analyzed, the scents can then be recreated by a perfumer.

One of the early pioneers of this technology was Roman Kaiser who used it to measure and characterize the scents of tropical rainforests. Headspace techniques have since been used extensively to sample in vivo floral headspace of a large variety of numerous taxa and their aromatic compounds such as fatty acid derivatives (aldehydes, alcohols and ketones), benzenoids and isoprenoids.

== Equipment ==
The headspace equipment involves a hollow dome or sphere-like objects which form an airtight seal and surrounds the objects of interest. Inert gases are passed into the space containing the object or a vacuum is established such that the odor compounds are removed from the headspace. These compounds are in turn captured using a variety of techniques, among them cold surfaces, solvent traps, and adsorbent materials, with the latter techniques capable of longer periods of collection. The samples can then be analyzed using techniques such as gas chromatography, mass spectrometry, or Carbon-13 NMR.

Several companies have patented similar headspace technologies:

- Aromascope (Takasago)
- Jungle Essence (Mane)
- NaturePrint (Firmenich)
- ScentTrek (Givaudan)
- Living Flower (IFF)

== Example findings ==
A living fruit or flower and one that has been picked smell differently. With headspace technology, chemists can identify the components that make up the scent of a living flower or fruit, and thus compare them to picked ones. Below are some published examples.

Jasmine
Compound	Living flower (%)	Picked flower (%)
6-Methyl 5-hepten-2-one	0.2	—
cis-3-Hexenyl acetate	0.2	—
Benzyl alcohol	—	4.0
cis/trans-Ocimene	0.2	1.1
Benzyl acetate	60.0	40.0
Linalool	3.0	30.0
Indole	11.0	2.0
cis-Jasmone	3.0	—
3,5-Dimethyl-2-ethylpyrazine	—	0.5
Methyl jasmonate	0.3	—

Peach
Compound	Living fruit (%)	Picked fruit (%)
Ethyl acetate	15.00	—
Dimethyl disulfide	0.6	—
cis 3-Hexenyl acetate	9.7	—
Methyl octanoate	34.2	7.1
Ethyl octanoate	7.4	11.0
6-Pentyl alpha pyrone	trace	10.6
gamma Decalactone	2.5	39.2

Spearmint
Compound	Living plant (%)	Picked plant (%)
Hexanal	0.5	trace
Hexanol	—	2.3
Limonene	17.7	1.8
Dihydro carvone	0.7	2.6
Carvone	24.0	70.0
Menthone/isomenthone	—	—
Menthol isomers	—	—
1,3,5-Undecatriene (mixture of 4 isomers)	0.5	—
