= Digital lollipop =

Electronic device

A digital lollipop is an electronic device that synthesizes virtual tastes by stimulating the human tongue with electric currents. The device can produce four primary tastes: sweet, sour, salty, and bitter. Digital lollipops were developed through research led by Nimesha Ranasinghe at the National University of Singapore.

== Design ==
According to Ranasinghe, "The system can manipulate the properties of electric currents [...] to formulate different stimuli." Additionally, his portfolio in 2013 mentioned that his team is "conducting experiments to analyze regional differences of the human tongue for electrical stimulation."

The devices generate alternating current signals through a silver electrode, stimulating the tongue's taste receptors to emulate the major taste components. It also produces small, varying amounts of heat to simulate food.

Eventually, the digital lollipop could aid Alzheimer's patients by helping them "either enhance or suppress certain senses". It may also allow people with diabetes to experience sweetness without increasing their blood sugar levels. The National University of Singapore research team is developing Taste Over Internet Protocol (TOIP) that would allow taste information to be communicated between locations.

== See also ==
- Digital scent technology
- Gustatory technology
