= Clara Ursitti =

Canadian-Italian artist

- Born: 1968 (age 57–58); North Bay, Ontario
- Known for: artist who explores scent, installation, sculpture, performance
- Website: https://www.claraursitti.com

Clara Ursitti is a Canadian-Italian artist based in Glasgow, Scotland. She was born in North Bay, Ontario in 1968.

She studied Fine Art at York University, Toronto and completed her MFA at the Glasgow School of Art in 1994.

== Works and exhibitions ==
Her artwork is widely recognised for its innovative use of scent and she is known a pioneer in the field of Olfactory Art. In 1994 she created Self-Portrait in Scent, Sketch no. 1. exhibited at The Centre for Contemporary Arts, Glasgow. Art historian Caro Verbeek, of the Vrije Universiteit and the Rijksmuseum Amsterdam, cites this work as a breakthrough in both artistic and technological terms.

Since this important breakthrough Ursitti has exhibited her work internationally in numerous museums, galleries and public spaces. Notable group exhibitions include 'Belle Haleine', at the Museum Tinguely, Basel, 'Something in the Air' at Museum Villa Rot, Ulm, 'Odor' at the Tirolean State Museum, Innsbruck and the Museum für Gegenwartskunst Siegen, The Tatton Park Biennial 2010, Museum Angewandete Kunst, Frankfurt, the Glasgow International Festival of Contemporary Art, the Gothenburg International Biennial, the Kunstverein Wolfsburg, Studio Voltaire, London, the Living Art Museum Iceland, Fife Contemporary, and the Centre For Contemporary Photography in Melbourne. In 2022 Ursitti's solo show 'Amik' opened at the Gallery of Modern Art, Glasgow. She has also had solo exhibitions at Transmission Gallery, Glasgow, YYZ Artists Outlet, Toronto, the Esther Klein Gallery, Philadelphia, Galleri 54 Gothenburg and the Collective, Edinburgh. In 2001 her scent based work Sub Club, August 8, 1998, Glasgow (1998) was included in the landmark survey exhibition 'Here and Now: Scottish Art 1990-2001'.

Communication Suite (2008) was a site specific installation based upon research into a 1960s US military experiment which attempted to teach a dolphin to speak English with Margaret Howe Lovatt as the key person tasked with developing these cross species interactions. This was part of a group show curated by Christine Borland in the communications suite of the University of Glasgow's Medical Building. Other artists included Douglas Gordon, Mark Dion, Cornelia Parker, Abramovich & Ulay, and Alistair McLennan.

Poison Ladies a gallery intervention, featured 28 women wearing the Christian Dior perfume Poison who appeared unannounced at an exhibition opening. As Jo Barret wrote in Canadian Art magazine 'Most aged older than 60, the women comprised a demographic sometimes considered invisible, but because of the aroma they carried into the room, they became visible and impossible to ignore.'

In addition to her gallery based installations Ursitti has also created a number of public interventions. She has often worked with local groups, such as the East of Scotland Car Club for a commission for the Edinburgh Art Festival in 2017, which was titled Bring Back The Hill. Another related work Kustom involved custom car enthusiasts making scented interventions throughout the city as part of the Glasgow International Festival of Art in 2016.

Doing science in a gendered world was an event, workshop and exhibition organised by LifeSpace and School of Life Sciences Athena SWAN, University of Dundee (Feb-April 2019).

A newly commissioned performance Break (2019) was part of the Parse conference for their new journal launch titled Work at Valand Academy and Skogen, Gothenburg, Sweden.

She was interviewed for the academic journal Art & Research in 2008 and also interviewed by Laura Estrada Prada for Roots & Routes. Research On Visual Cultures in 2016.

In 2010 Ursitti was awarded a commission to make a film for the Wall of Light series commissioned by the BBC and Centre for Contemporary Art to celebrate Glasgow, sport and the Commonwealth Games handover.

She currently teaches on the Sculpture and Environmental Art course at Glasgow School of Art.

== Selected awards and residencies ==
2019 Royal Society of Edinburgh Arts and Humanities research grant

2019 Creative Scotland Open Fund

2012-14 Canada Council Long Term Artist Grant

In 2007 Ursitti was the Helen Chadwick Fellow at the British School at Rome and The University of Oxford, where she worked with Charles Spence of the Department of Experimental Psychology exploring how a combination of visual and non-visual senses creates meaning and experience for those encountering a work of art.

2004 IASPIS artist residency (International Artists Studio Programme in Sweden)

2001 Scottish Arts Council Assistance Award

1998 Sci-Art Award, The Wellcome Trust, London

1995 Travel Grant, British Arts Council

== Selected publications ==
Stephen Wilson, Art and Science Now, Thames and Hudson, London (2012) ISBN 9780500289952

Caro Verbeek, Something in the Air - Scent in Art, Museum Villa Rot, Germany (2015)

Fransceca Bacci & David Melcher, Art and the Senses Oxford University Press (2011) ISBN 978-0199230600

Jim Drobnick, The Smell Culture Reader, Berg Publishers, London (2006) ISBN 1845202139

Here and Now: Scottish Art 1990-2001 published by Dundee Contemporary Arts (2001) ISBN 095351787X
