= ISmell =

Computer accessory

The iSmell is a commercial application of digital scent technology. Personal Scent Synthesizer developed by DigiScents Inc. was a small device that can be connected to a computer through a USB port and powered using any ordinary electrical outlet. The appearance of the device is similar to that of a shark's fin, with many holes lining the "fin" to release the various scents. Using a cartridge similar to a printer's, it can synthesize and even create new smells from certain combinations of other scents. These newly created odors can be used to closely replicate common natural and man-made odors. The cartridges used also need to be swapped every so often once the scents inside are used up. Once partnered with websites and interactive media, the scents can be activated either automatically once a website is opened or manually. However, the product is no longer on the market and never generated substantial sales. Digiscent had plans for the iSmell to have several versions but did not progress past the prototype stage. The company did not last long and filed for bankruptcy a short time after.

In 2006, PC World Magazine commented that "[f]ew products literally stink, but this one did or at least it would have, had it progressed beyond the prototype stage."

== Digiscent ==
=== Company start ===
In 1999, Joel Lloyd Bellenson and Dexter Smith, on vacation in Miami, began to think about how to store and reproduce the smells that they had experienced on the beach. They first worked to create a database of smells and then they created the device that would connect to the PC, the iSmell. Their idea was considered to be somewhat profitable, as they had raised "$20 million investments by major investors" such as Givaudan, the largest perfumes and essences company and Real Networks, a provider of streaming services.

=== Bankruptcy ===
The iSmell lacked not in technological capability but in marketing success. DigiScents shut down due to a lack of funding, with the events of September 11, 2001 also affecting the company, although as of June 2001, it was still licensing its technology and looking for funding for a relaunch.

== Product design ==
The iSmell was designed to be easy to set up and use, a simple USB port and a cable to be plugged into an ordinary electrical outlet. Digiscents collected thousands of smells based on their chemical makeup and their spot on the spectrum of smells. Each combination of chemicals was then assigned to a small file that represented that specific mixture of ingredients. The file is then embedded into a website, email, or computer program. The user triggers the smell by clicking on the file or opening an email. When the file is opened, that file is sent to the Digiscent and the iSmell will emit the correct combination and amount of chemicals to replicate the requested smell.

=== Prototype ===
The original prototype was a black box that was 5 inches (12.7 cm) deep, 2 inches (5.08 cm) wide, and 3 inches (7.62 cm) tall. The device would contain a cartridge which held a set amount of smells. When activated, a fan will start sucking in air through the rear end, and blowing it over tiny vials of oil, being selectively heated based on the desired chemical combination. The air picks up the smell and is sent out of a 2-inch vent, then into your nose.

== Breakdown of iSmell ==
=== Chemicals used to create smells ===
The main points that the article talks about with the technical break down discusses the idea that the system that is involved in the actual product is very similar to a printer where there are cartridges within the actual product. There are 128 chemicals that are stored, and they are usually natural oil and other fragrances. Simonharrop2 writes, "Unlike a printing system which basically just needs Cyan, Magenta, Yellow, and Black, any system to recreate more than one or two basic aroma compounds with any degree of fidelity, would have to have reservoirs or cartridges of hundreds of different base aroma chemicals…".

=== Dispensing of chemicals into air to create smell ===
The way the iSmell dispenses the chemicals into the air is very similar to a Febreze dispenser where it releases chemical molecules and then they diffuse in the air. In the article "How Internet Odors Will Work" it describes the process of how the aromas are dispensed into the air, " A user requests or triggers the file by clicking a mouse or opening an e-mail, A small amount of the aroma is emitted by the device in the direct vicinity of the user".

=== Design of dispensers and chemical banks ===
The design of the dispenser is basically "shaped like a shark's fin, and it will be connected to your PC through a serial or universal serial bus (USB) port. It can be plugged into any ordinary electrical outlet."

== Integration ==
The iSmell was also designed for use inside games and movies. The modular design of the iSmell allows a programmer to integrate smell activation files that will trigger the release of any smell or combination that they desire. If the user were to watch a movie with the digiscent files embedded, the user can smell the surroundings of each scene. Users are able to smell freshly cut grass when a hill appears on-screen, or the smell of burgers on a grill while watching a cooking show. Or in video games, in a racing game, burning rubber, and in an action game, gunpowder.

== See also ==
- Digital scent technology
- Smell-O-Vision
- Odorama
- Scentography
