= Jack Henley =

American screenwriter (1896–1958)

- Born: December 6, 1896; Ireland
- Died: November 2, 1958 (aged 61); Los Angeles, California, U.S.
- Occupation: Screenwriter
- Years active: 1932-1955

Jack Henley (December 6, 1896 – November 2, 1958) was an American screenwriter. He wrote for 80 films between 1932 and 1955. He was born in Ireland, and died in Los Angeles, California.

== Selected filmography ==
- Hey, Pop! (1932)
- In the Dough (1932)
- Buzzin' Around (1933)
- How've You Bean? (1933)
- Close Relations (1933)
- Tomalio (1933)
- Art Trouble (1934)
- Ups and Downs (1937)
- Hoots Mon! (1940)
- That's the Ticket (1940)
- Two Yanks in Trinidad (1942)
- Dangerous Blondes (1943)
- My Kingdom for a Cook (1943)
- Bonzo Goes to College (1952)
