= Audrey Roos =

American novelist and screenwriter (1912–1982)

- Born: 1912; Elizabeth, New Jersey
- Died: December 11, 1982 (aged 69–70); Martha's Vineyard, Massachusetts
- Other names: Audrey Kelley; Kelley Roos
- Education: Carnegie Institute of Technology
- Occupation: Writer
- Spouse: William Roos
- Children: Carol Roos Bell; Stephen Roos
- Awards: Edgar Allan Poe Award, 1961

Audrey Roos (1912–1982) was an American writer who, with her husband William Roos, co-authored many mystery novels, short stories, and plays. The wife-husband team, under the pseudonym Kelley Roos, often wrote romantic suspense novels featuring a married pair of sleuths, Jeff and Haila Troy, who lived in New York City. Some of their work appeared under their own names, Audrey and William Roos, rather than under the pseudonym. In 1956 they wrote Speaking of Murder, a play produced at the Royale Theatre in New York. Their television adaptation of The Burning Court by John Dickson Carr won an Edgar Award from the Mystery Writers of America in 1961.

== Bibliography ==
=== As Audrey and William Roos (with William Roos) ===
- Speaking of Murder: A Melodrama; three-act play first produced in 1956 (1957)
- A Few Days in Madrid (1965)
- The Mystery Next Door (1972)
- The Case of the Burning Court, adaptation for television of The Burning Court by John Dickson Carr (1960)

=== Other works ===
Work by the Rooses appeared in Four and Twenty Bloodhounds (1950), an anthology edited by Anthony Boucher, and in Anthology 1971 (1970), edited by Ellery Queen. They contributed short stories to American Magazine, Mike Shayne Mystery Magazines, Ellery Queen's Mystery Magazine, and other periodicals. The Mugar Memorial Library at Boston University holds a collection of their manuscripts. William Roos, writing under the pen name William Rand, adapted the Ellery Queen novel The Four of Hearts for the stage in 1949, although there is no evidence it was ever performed.
