= This Is Cinerama =

1952 American documentary film

- US re-release film poster
- Directed by: Mike Todd; Michael Todd, Jr.; Walter A. Thompson; Fred Rickey
- Produced by: Robert L. Bendick; Merian C. Cooper
- Starring: Lowell Thomas
- Cinematography: Harry Squire
- Edited by: William Henry; Milton Shifman
- Music by: Louis Forbes
- Production company: Cinerama Productions
- Distributed by: Cinerama Releasing Corporation
- Release dates: September 30, 1952 (New York, premiere)
- Running time: 115 minutes
- Country: United States
- Language: English
- Budget: $1 million
- Box office: $41.6 million

This Is Cinerama is a 1952 American documentary film directed by Mike Todd, Michael Todd Jr., Walter A. Thompson and Fred Rickey and starring Lowell Thomas. It is designed to introduce the widescreen process Cinerama, which broadens the aspect ratio so that the viewer's peripheral vision is involved. This Is Cinerama premiered on September 30, 1952, at the Broadway Theatre in New York City.

== Plot ==
The film begins in black and white and the standard Academy ratio (also presented in mono sound) as travel writer and newscaster Lowell Thomas appears to discuss the evolution of film entertainment, from the earliest cave paintings designed to suggest movement to the introduction of color and sound. At the conclusion of the 12-minute lecture, Thomas speaks the words "This Is Cinerama" and the screen expands into the full Cinerama 2.65:1 aspect ratio and full color as a series of vignettes, narrated by Thomas, begins.

The film includes point-of-view scenes of the Atom Smasher roller coaster from the Rockaways' Playland, then moves on to a scene of the temple dance from the La Scala opera company's production of Aïda. Also seen are views of Niagara Falls, a performance by a church choir (in sepia-toned black and white), a performance by the Vienna Boys' Choir, scenes of the canals of Venice, a military tattoo in Edinburgh, a bullfight in Spain, the "triumphal scene" from Aïda, a sound demonstration in stereo and scenes from the now defunct Cypress Gardens amusement park featuring an elaborate waterskiing show. The film closes with a sequence featuring soaring scenes of the natural landmarks of the American West, filmed from the nose of a low flying North American B-25 Mitchell, as the Mormon Tabernacle Choir sings "America the Beautiful," "Come, Come Ye Saints," and the "Battle Hymn of the Republic."

The film's producers were Lowell Thomas, Merian C. Cooper and Robert L. Bendick. The film was also directed by Bendick (and an uncredited Mike Todd Jr.). Cooper, who had directed the original 1933 King Kong, had a long history of technical innovation in cinema.

== Production ==
Parts of the film were shot in the Kennecott open-pit mine and in Zion National Park in Utah. The movie was shot in Eastmancolor and released with Technicolor prints.

== Distribution ==
Because the new technology required a special setup of three projectors and multiple soundtracks, the film was shown in a single theater in most cities, with reserved seats and lengthy runs, a distribution model known as a road show.

Audience members were asked to complete suggestion cards with their ideas for the next Cinerama demonstration film. In 1955, Cinerama Holiday was released.

For years the entire film could be shown only by one of the three remaining three-projector Cinerama installations capable of projecting 35mm prints. In September 2012, in celebration of the road show's 60th anniversary, Flicker Alley released the film in its original format on Blu-ray disc. The image was adjusted with the SmileBox format, as was the Blu-ray release of How the West was Won, and the disc includes an audio commentary and other special features. On October 18, 2012, the Turner Classic Movies cable network aired This Is Cinerama in its original aspect ratio for the first time (also in the Smilebox format).

In May 2018, Flicker Alley rereleased the film on Blu-ray disc with a remastered audio and video presentation again in the original Cinerama format. However, unlike the original 2012 Blu-ray release that was sourced from a 65mm duplicate negative because of financial constraints, the 2018 Deluxe Edition was a full restoration sourced from the original camera negative.

The film's copyright status is unclear. It fell into the public domain in 1980, 28 years after its initial copyright filing, but some allege that it was renewed soon after the expiration.

== Box office ==
In its opening week in New York, This Is Cinerama was shown twice per day, with an additional 5:00 p.m. showing on Fridays, Saturdays, and Sundays. It saw near-capacity (1,250) attendance, grossing $35,000 from 17 performances with a top price of $2.80. The initial eight-week advance sale was increased to 16 weeks after the film proved to be popular. Early matinee attendance was impacted by the 1952 World Series between the New York Yankees and the Brooklyn Dodgers. After one year, the film had played in four cities (New York, Los Angeles, Detroit, and Chicago) and had sold 2,225,000 tickets, grossing $4,305,000, with $2,208,000 in New York alone.

At the Warner Hollywood in Los Angeles, the film played for 115 weeks, grossing an L.A. record of $3,845,200. The film played for a record 99 weeks in Chicago.

By January 1954, the film had grossed $6.5 million from seven cities in the United States and Canada. A year later, Variety noted that the film was estimated to gross $25 million and included it on its all-time chart with rentals of $12.5 million. By 1995, Variety noted that the film had grossed $41.6 million.

== Awards ==
At the 26th Academy Awards, This Is Cinerama was nominated for the award for Best Music, Scoring of a Dramatic or Comedy Picture. Although the score was credited to Louis Forbes, who conducted the music, it was composed by Paul Sawtell, Roy Webb and Max Steiner (who composed the opening and ending sequences and those featuring Cypress Gardens and the flight across the country).

In 2002, the Library of Congress deemed the film "culturally, historically, or aesthetically significant" and inducted it into the National Film Registry for permanent preservation.

== See also ==
- Cinerama
- Cinerama Adventure
