= Gayil Nalls =

American interdisciplinary artist and theorist (born 1953)

- Born: July 17, 1953 (age 72); Washington, D.C.
- Education: Virginia Commonwealth University; Parsons School of Design; American University; Central Saint Martins; Corcoran College of Art and Design; University of East London
- Occupations: Artist, theorist
- Notable work: World Sensorium

Gayil Nalls (born July 17, 1953) is an American interdisciplinary artist and theorist living in New York City and Hudson Valley, New York. Her artistic practice originates in philosophical investigations of personal and collective sensory experiences, memory and identity, and often include the relationship of these experiences to disappearing ecologies. She is an influential contributor to the aesthetics of crowds and human massing. Her multimedia work frequently unites scientific and technological approaches to art-making, exploring the boundaries between the two.

== Biography ==
Nalls was born July 17, 1953, in Washington, D.C. She studied at Virginia Commonwealth University, Parsons School of Design, American University, Central Saint Martins, and The Corcoran College of Art and Design. In 2007, she earned her Ph.D. in the aesthetics and science of olfaction from The University of East London in the United Kingdom. She was the visiting artist professor at the Institut Superieur International Du Parfum ISIPCA, Versaille, France in 1998. Nalls currently serves as an associate senior researcher at SMARTLab, and is an adjunct associate professor at the school of mechanical and materials engineering, University College Dublin.

Nalls’ work has been featured in thirty solo exhibitions, including six at galleries in New York City. Her work has also been included in over 100 group exhibitions. Her paintings, sculptures, photographs, videos, prints and olfactory sculptures can be found in the collections of institutions such as The Metropolitan Museum of Art, the Luther W. Brady Art Gallery at George Washington University, the National Museum of American Art, and the Hunter Museum of American Art, which holds four works from her iconoclastic period, and numerous other public and private collections. She has created several multimedia installation works and large-scale public commissions as well.

She is currently director of the World Sensorium / Conservancy and editor of Plantings, WS/C’s journal.

== Work ==
In the 1980s, Nalls’ paintings were a pronounced iconoclastic aesthetic, controversial both philosophically and spiritually. They challenged traditional belief systems and advocated environmental wholeness—living systems—web of life thinking. In the 1982 exhibition curated by Lee Fleming, Washington Iconoclassicism, at Washington Project for the Arts, Washington, DC and Artemisia Gallery, Chicago, IL, Ms. Fleming wrote in the catalog that Nalls creates, “decidedly unpastoral visions.” Saying further that: “Placing human objects under the fierce heat of Modernism, she creates situations which pose the fragility of human effort and decoration (including art) against the forbidding façade of passing ideal.”

While Nalls continues to work across several media, her artistic practice has grown progressively more conceptual over the course of her career. She is best known for her olfactory sculpture, World Sensorium'', an ongoing project that premiered at the Times Square 2000 millennial celebration in New York City." Following ten years of ethnobotanical research, including a world survey establishing the most culturally relevant natural scent of each nation and territory, Nalls composed World Sensorium from botanical essences blended proportionally according to each nation’s fraction in the overall world population in the year 2000. For the Times Square 2000 millennial celebration, the “world scent”, as it is described by Nalls, dropped over the crowd at midnight on specially designed, microencapsulated paperworks.

Calling upon her own scientific research into the link between scent, memory, neurology, and crowd theory, World Sensorium seeks to evoke a global memory and evolve a metabolic and empathetic collective in addition to the technological collective created through mass media coverage.

In 2005, Nalls completed the September 11 Memorial for The City of White Plains, New York. In 2012, Nalls exhibited The Smell of a Critical Moment, a project which investigated the unique role of chemical communication within participants of Occupy Wall Street––the odors that carry information that influences human emotions, behavior and judgments, as well as our sense of beauty.

Nalls continues to create numerous works that affect mood and behavior by smell or ingestion. In 2015 her olfactory art was featured in two museum exhibitions: There’s Something in the Air, at The Museum Villa Rot in Germany and The Smell of War at Kasteel de Lovie, in Belgium, and in Five Senses at Stary Browar in Poznań, Poland.

In 2016, she co-curated a public forum, exhibition and screening of her interview series Exceptional Voices at El Barrio ArtSpace in New York.

For many years she ran The Massing Lab, a site focused on collective behavior and protests.
