= Smell-O-Vision =

Device that releases scents corresponding with scenes of a movie

Smell-O-Vision was a system that released odor during the projection of a film so that the viewer could "smell" what was happening in the movie. Created by Hans Laube, the technique made its only appearance in the 1960 film Scent of Mystery, produced by Mike Todd Jr., son of film producer Mike Todd. The process injected 30 odors into a movie theater's seats when triggered by the film's soundtrack.

Roughly similar concepts integrating odor experiences into entertainment performances date back at least to 1868 for live theatre, with the first film usage in 1906. Other approaches include General Electric's "Smell-O-Rama" in 1953 and the rival "AromaRama" system in 1959. In cheeky homage to this era, John Waters enhanced his 1981 film Polyester with an "Odorama" scratch-n-sniff card.

== History ==
In 1868, a novel effect was used at the Alhambra Theatre of Variety in London when Rimmel scent was sprayed into the theatre during the Magic Dance of The Fairy Acorn Tree. The use of scents in conjunction with film dates back to 1906, before the introduction of sound. In this first instance, a 1958 issue of Film Daily claims that Samuel Roxy Rothafel of the Family Theatre in Forest City, Pennsylvania, placed a wad of cotton wool that had been soaked in rose oil in front of an electric fan during a newsreel about the Rose Bowl Game. However, between 1903 and 1915, there were no games held, so it is unknown what the newsreel was about, although the Rose Parade (which has been held annually since 1890) seems likely. In 1916, the Rivoli Theatre in New York was equipped with the ability to pump scents into the theatre for the short film Story of the Flowers.

During the screening of the film Lilac Time in 1929 at the Fenway Theatre in Boston, Massachusetts, the manager poured a pint of lilac perfume into the plenum chamber of the theatre's ventilation system so that the audience would smell lilac when the film's title appeared. The same year, during the showing of The Broadway Melody, a New York City theater sprayed perfume from the ceiling. Arthur Mayer installed an in-theater smell system in Paramount's Rialto Theater on Broadway in 1933, which he used to deliver odors during a film. However, it would take over an hour to clear the scents from the theater, and some smells would linger for days afterward.

All of these early attempts, however, were made by theater owners and not part of the films themselves. The audience could be distracted by the scents instead of focusing on what the film director intended. Furthermore, because of the size of the theaters, large amounts of perfume had to be released to reach all members of the audience. This caused another problem: the human nose has a difficult time transitioning between smells until the molecules that triggered one smell are completely cleared from the nose, and with that volume of perfume, the scents would mix, becoming muddled.

Walt Disney was the first filmmaker to explore the idea of actually including scents with his 1940 film Fantasia, but eventually decided against pursuing this for cost reasons.

Laube's technique, which he initially dubbed "Scentovision", was introduced during the 1939 New York World's Fair. The system connected pipes to individual seats in theaters, so that the timing and amount could be carefully controlled by the projectionist using a control board. The first feature length film using the process was the 35-minute Mein Traum which was screened during the fair on October 10, 1940. The New York Times reported in 1943 that Scentovision "is said to have produced odors as quickly and easily as the soundtrack of a film produces sound", but Laube, a Swiss national, returned to Europe in 1946, unable to interest any film or television studios in his invention.

Further attempts with releasing scents timed to key points in a film happened at the Vogue Theatre in Detroit, Michigan in 1940 with Boom Town and The Sea Hawk.

General Electric developed a system in 1953 that they called Smell-O-Rama. They demonstrated its potential by exhibiting a three-dimensional image of a rose accompanied by floral scents.

In 1955, Laube, with financing from the Stanley Warner Corporation, set up a working model of his system at the Cinerama-Warner Theatre in New York to show a ten-minute pilot film. In November 1957, the system, owned by Laube and Bert S. Good, was patented in the United States.

== Competition with AromaRama ==
In September 1958, an announcement was made about a film called Screen Scent No. 1 to be filmed in March 1959 using a fragrance process called "Weiss-Rhodia Screen-Scent" to be produced by a company headed by Charles H. Weiss, a public relations executive. The film was described as a "kaleidoscope of comedy, drama and travelogue". The process had been developed over two years by Rhodia, Inc., a subsidiary of Rhône-Poulenc.

In October 1959, it was reported that Walter Reade Jr. was rushing to release The China Wall, an Italian-made travelogue through China at the Palace Theatre in New York City. The system to be used for the film was different to that of Smell-O-Vision as it sent scents through the air-conditioning system of a theater.

The particular technique was invented by Charles Weiss, who stated in a 1959 appearance on CBS's television programme To Tell the Truth:

I ... have invented a process to make movies smell. I call the process AromaRama. After more than two and a half years of work, our picture Behind the Great Wall will open December 2 at the Mayfair Theater in New York. In addition to seeing the action and hearing the dialogue, our audiences will be able to smell the scenes. More than 100 different aromas will be injected into the theater during the film. Among these are the odors of grass, earth, exploding firecrackers, a river, incense, burning torches, horses, restaurants, the scent of a trapped tiger and many more. We believe, with Rudyard Kipling, that smells are surer than sounds or sights to make the heartstrings crack. (Note: Chuck Weiss, whose reputation was gained creating special news-making events in New York City, the most competitive market in the United States. His appearance on To Tell the Truth, included his affidavit as read by host Bud Collyer. Originally aired November 5, 1959 and rebroadcast on Game Show Network on March 19, 2009.)

The film was eventually released as Behind the Great Wall on December 9, 1959 at the (recently renamed) DeMille Theatre in New York, just a month ahead of Scent of Mystery, and the competition between the two films was called "the battle of the smellies" by Variety. The film was directed by Carlo Lizzani with the "AromaRama" process conceived and directed by Charles Weiss. The film was accompanied by a range of 72 smells that included incense, smoke, burning pitch, oranges, spices and a barnyard of geese.

Besides the slightly earlier release date, the name AromaRama itself made fun of Todd Sr.'s Cinerama process, and the choice of film was also deliberate, as travelogues were one of Cinerama's specialties.

An alternate explanation of the provenance of the word "AromaRama" was provided by Weiss: "Screenwriter Henry Myers (Destry Rides Again) came up with the name "AromaRama" because the process was to the sense of smell what Cinerama was to the sense of sight. AromaRama echoed Cinerama rather than made fun of it. Behind the Great Wall was chosen because distributor Walter Reade felt many of the scenes would be even more impressive with scents added. Because it had won major awards in Europe, it was expected to be well received in America – and it was.

The film received scathing treatment from The New York Times reviewer Bosley Crowther, who called it a "stunt" that had an "artistic benefit" of "nil". The accuracy of the odors was described as "capricious ... elusive, oppressive or perfunctory and banal ... merely synthetic smells that occasionally befit what one is viewing, but more often they confuse the atmosphere". By contrast, the film itself, which was not made with AromaRama in mind, received high praise. Further negative reviews came from The New Yorker.

Not all reviews were unfavorable. The New York Herald Tribune, in its review titled "AromaRama Premieres Here: Audience Smells What It Sees and Hears in Movie", the uncited critic writes: "With a few minor exceptions, the audience last night pronounced the succession of smells a total success from the start, which consisted of an opening from Chet Huntley, television commentator, who demonstrated what was about to happen by slicing an orange while the odor track suffused the theatre with a smell of oranges being sliced." A follow-up article in the December 13, 1959 Sunday Herald Tribune said: "they do not give the impression of being blown in or wafted from any specific direction (although they are said to be linked to the airconditioning system.) Actually the individual smells simply appear in the nostrils without any effort being made to sniff or strain for them. And what is more remarkable, each individual odor disappears promptly when the image smelled leaves the screen ... There is no question about its effectiveness in creating illusions of reality."

The Sunday News awarded the film 3 1/3 stars out of a possible 4 stars in its review titled "'Behind Great Wall' Puts Smell on Screen". Reviewer Dorothy Masters wrote, "Several wise men anticipated the birth of AromaRama, the major prophet being Charles Weiss, a public relations executive, who journeyed afar to enlist the support of a chemical company, an electronic air-filter plant, a camera equipment firm and an industrial timer organization. Together they devised a workable system for coordinating the picture of an orange with the smell of an orange."

The December 21, 1959 edition of Time Magazine stated in its review of "Behind the Great Wall", "The AromaRama process itself, developed by a public relations executive, Charles Weiss, is fairly ingenious. The film carries a 'scent track' that transmits cues to an electronic 'trigger' that fires a salvo of scent into the theatre through the air-conditioning ports. The AromaRama people claim that they can reach every nose in the house within two seconds and remove the odor almost as fast. The perfumes are built up on a quick-evaporating base (Freon) and as the air is drawn off for filtering it is passed over electrically charged baffles that precipitate the aromatic particles."

The film's poor reception threatened to derail the debut Scent of Mystery before it even opened, as the cinematic press now expected the odor release system to be poor.

In its first week in New York it grossed $33,400 from 29 performances.

Charles Weiss continued to experiment with motion pictures and aromas, adding fragrances to classic black and white films to demonstrate how smells might be used in the future.

== Scent of Mystery ==
Todd Sr. had staged a series of musical films at the 1939 World's Fair and met Laube during this time. Fifteen years later, Todd and his son were thinking of ways they could enhance their film Around the World in Eighty Days. They remembered Laube's invention and although they decided not to use it for this film, Todd Jr., after his father's death, was intrigued enough to sign Laube to a movie deal.

Laube's system, which was renamed "Smell-O-Vision" by Todd, had been improved in the intervening time. Now, instead of the scents being manually released, it used what he called a "smell brain", which was a series of perfume containers linked in a belt, arranged in the order that they would be released. The belt was then wound around a motorized reel. As the film threaded through the movie projector, markers on it would cue the brain. Needles would pierce membranes on the containers, releasing the scents, which would then be blown by fans through the pipes to individual vents underneath the audience members' seats. The cost of outfitting a theater to accommodate the system was anywhere from US$15,000 at Chicago's Cinestage theater to $1,000,000 elsewhere ($163,245 to $10,883,015 today).

Both Laube and Todd understood that the system had aesthetic limitations. For example, a heavy drama was not the sort of film that could employ it well. Thus, the system was to be deployed with the mystery-comedy Scent of Mystery, which would be the first film in which smells revealed certain plot points to the audience. For example, one character is identified by the smell of pipe tobacco.

=== Reception ===
Smell-O-Vision did not work as intended. According to Variety, aromas were released with a distracting hissing noise and audience members in the balcony complained that the scents reached them several seconds after the action was shown on the screen. In other parts of the theater, the odors were too faint, causing audience members to sniff loudly in an attempt to catch the scent. These technical problems were mostly corrected after the first few showings, but the poor word of mouth, in conjunction with generally negative reviews of the film itself, signaled the end of Smell-O-Vision. A 2000 Time reader survey listed Smell-O-Vision in the "Top 100 Worst Ideas of All Time".

Scent of Mystery was shown with an animated short titled Old Whiff (also known as The Tale of Old Whiff), which was about a bloodhound who had lost his sense of smell; the dog's voice was provided by Bert Lahr and was animated by Format Films.

== Legacy ==
Director Les Blank would roast heads of garlic in a toaster oven at screenings of his 1978 film "Garlic Is as Good as Ten Mothers". He referred to this technique as "Smellaround.".

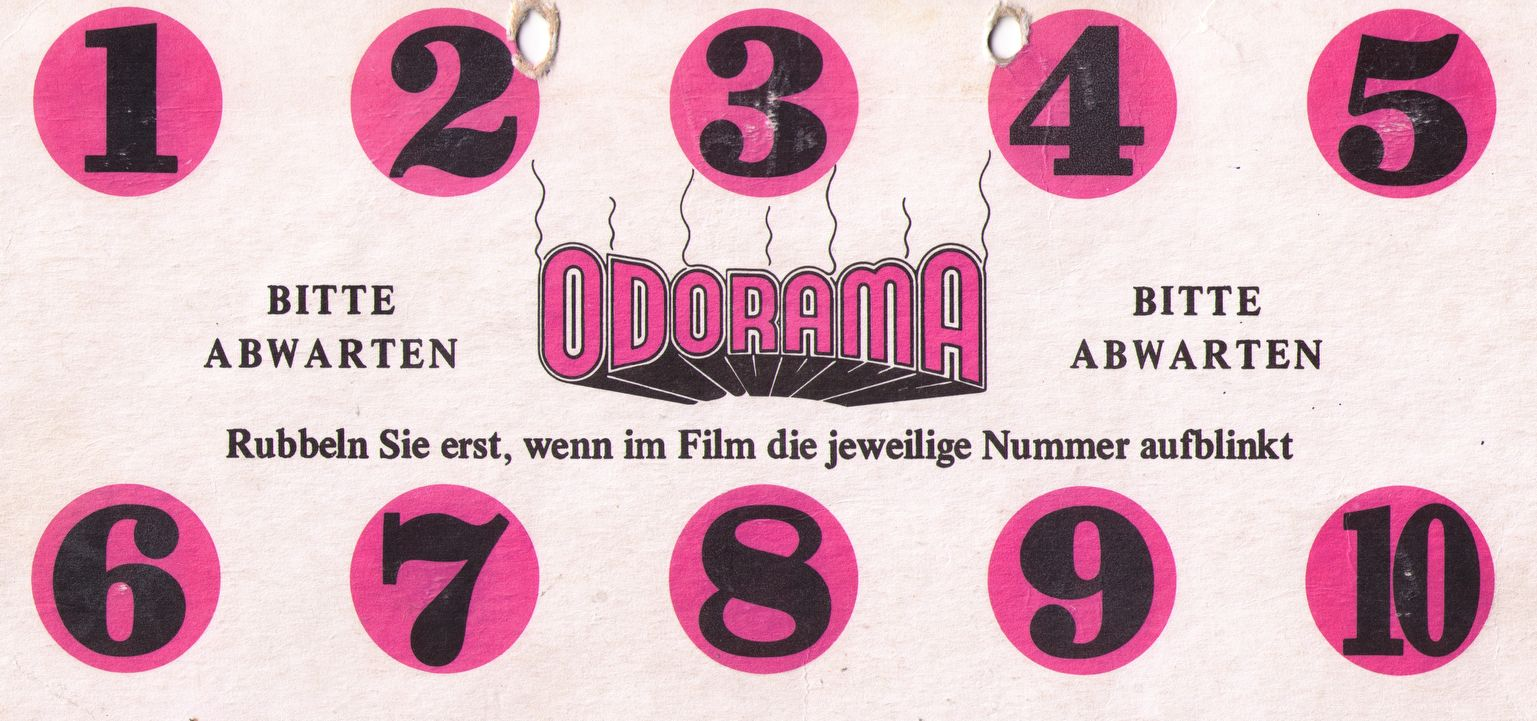
German card from the film Polyester

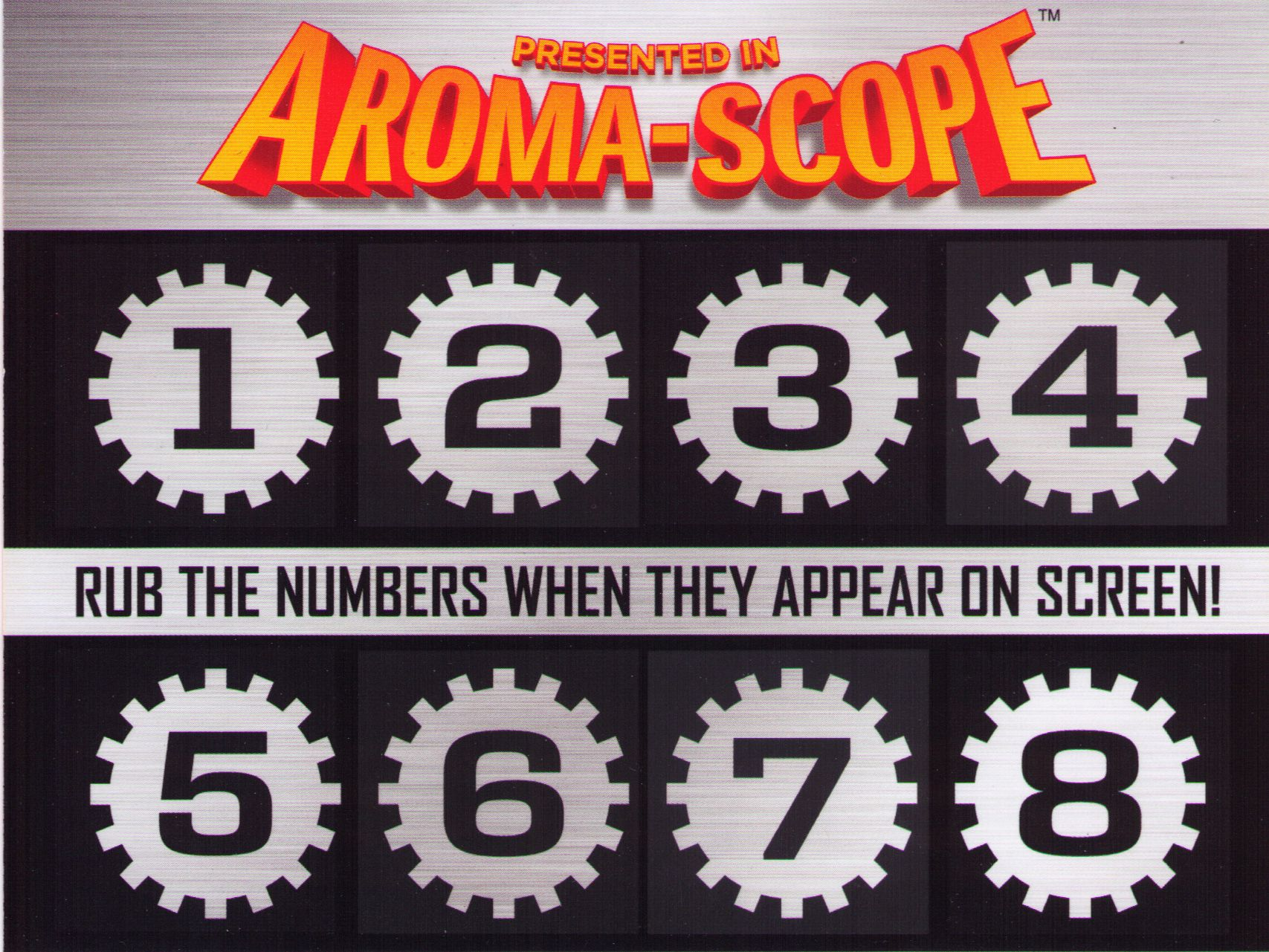
Aroma-Scope card for Spy Kids: All the Time in the World

In homage to Smell-O-Vision, American film director John Waters released an enhanced "Odorama" version of his film Polyester in 1981. Waters included scratch and sniff cards that the audience could use while watching the movie. Each card contained ten numbered spots that were scratched when that number flashed in the bottom right corner of the screen. Although this approach solved the problems inherent in previous attempts at this technology, it did not gain widespread usage for other films. The idea, however, was duplicated four times: firstly in the UK by ITV in June 1985 when an edition of science programme The Real World and Saturday morning children's programme No. 73 were both aired in "Aromavision" with accompanying "Aromapack" scratch and sniff cards distributed with listings magazine TVTimes; the second time in the mid-1980s when MTV aired Scent of Mystery in conjunction with a convenience store promotion that offered scratch and sniff cards; the third time was the 2003 animated film Rugrats Go Wild, the makers of which claimed it was a homage to Waters. The fourth time was with the fourth installment of the Spy Kids movie series, in which scratch n' sniff cards were given to movie goers, who were instructed to scratch the number as it came up on screen.

Walt Disney World and the Disneyland Resort currently make use of this idea, in their 3-D films and other attractions. Disney's Animal Kingdom's It's Tough to Be a Bug! releases an unpleasant odor coinciding with a stink bug on-screen, causing an audience reaction; similarly Mickey's Philharmagic at the Magic Kingdom and Disney California Adventure produces pie scents. Soarin' Over California, Soarin', and Soarin' Around the World include orange blossoms, pine forest, sea air fragrances, grass, and cherry blossoms as the scenery flies below the passengers. Monsters, Inc. Mike & Sulley to the Rescue! briefly takes riders through a ginger-scented sushi house. It is unknown, however, if the technology behind this is the same or a derivative of Laube's work.

In 2006, NTT Communications, a Japanese telecom giant, developed a new way to display odors during the release of Terrence Malick's The New World. During seven key moments throughout the film, scents were emitted by an internet server that was linked to the reel of film, effectively downloading the scent. The scents used were supposed to evoke from the audience the emotions that were trying to be expressed in the film. Scents included floral for romance scenes, peppermint, and rosemary for tear-jerking moments; orange and grapefruit for joyful sequences; and eucalyptus, tea tree, and herbs for angry scenes.

In 2010, the Norwegian film Kurt Josef Wagle And The Legend of the Fjord Witch by director Tommy Wirkola was released to cinemas with scratch and sniff cards that the audience could use while watching the movie. One year later, the American film Spy Kids: All the Time in the World by director Robert Rodriguez used the same idea, advertised as "4D Aroma-Scope".

There have been further attempts to develop similar systems for the use with television or advertising screens using gel pellets or inkjet printers to spray small amounts of scent.

In 2014, Regal Cinemas launched a new theater type, called 4DX, which incorporates smells into the movie experience. Other off-screen features are incorporated into 4DX as well, including motion enabled chairs, fog, strong scents, and water and air to simulate wind and rain. Regal currently operates 18 theaters with 4DX.

Scents were included along with haptic sensations in the 2023 4D film Postcard from Earth.

== Portrayals ==
=== April Fools' joke ===
In 1965, BBC TV played an April Fools' Day joke on their viewers. The network aired an "interview" with a man who had invented a new technology called "Smellovision" that allowed viewers at home to experience aromas produced in the television studio. To demonstrate, the man chopped some onions and brewed a pot of coffee. Viewers called in to confirm that they had smelled the aromas that were "transmitted" through their television sets.

=== In television ===
The 1944 Merrie Melodies cartoon The Old Grey Hare includes a newspaper article which reads "Smellevision replaces television" seen by Elmer Fudd after he apparently visits in the distant future of the year 2000. However, another part of the article which was not read out loud by Elmer hints criticism from then-Merrie Melodies music composer and former Walt Disney colleague Carl Stalling, stating that "Carl Stalling Sez It Will Never Work!"

Steve Urkel invents a helmet-based smellovision device on an episode of the sitcom, Family Matters and convinces Carl Winslow to try it out. As usual, however, the device quickly goes haywire, burning Carl's hair in the process.

On the animated sitcom Futurama in the episodes "The Honking" and "That's Lobstertainment!", Smell-O-Vision has successfully taken off. In the latter episode, Harold Zoid, a washed up movie actor, comments he flopped after they invented "Smell-O-Vision". In the former episode, there is also a reference to the system when the logo is shown at the start of the episode. It reads at the bottom "Now in Smell-O-Vision" and another has the sentence "Smell-O-Vision users insert nostril tubes now". In addition, the episode "A Big Piece of Garbage" introduces the Smelloscope, a telescope-like device that allows people to smell distant cosmic objects.

In 1995, the BBC's Children in Need brought scratch and sniff smell-o-vision to the masses. Through the Saturday evening family show Noel's House Party, viewers could experience various odors to complement their television experience. A similar event called "Smelly Telly" for Cartoon Network's Cow and Chicken animated series involved scratch and sniff cards as well, lasting from April 26 to 30, 1999.

== See also ==
- Digital lollipop
- Digital scent technology
- iSmell
- Smelling screen
- Synesthesia

== Bibliography ==
- Gilbert, Avery N. (2008). "Hollywood Psychophysics". What the Nose Knows. Crown Publishers. ISBN 978-1-4000-8234-6.
