= The Institute for Art and Olfaction =

- Type: Non-profit
- Industry: Art, Perfume
- Founded: 2012
- Headquarters: Los Angeles
- Area served: Worldwide
- Services: Education, The Art and Olfaction Awards, Project Space, Art Exhibitions, Art Residencies, Radio, Collection and Library
- Website: www.artandolfaction.com

The Institute for Art and Olfaction is a non-profit organization devoted to advancing public, artistic and experimental engagement with scent. It was founded in 2012 by Saskia Wilson-Brown.

== History ==
Described as "the West Coast's first organization to explore perfume in a larger arts context", The Institute for Art and Olfaction (IAO) was founded in October 2012 by Saskia Wilson-Brown. The IAO opened its experimental studio to the public in downtown Los Angeles in March 2013, moving to Koreatown in March 2014 and to its home on Chung King Road in Chinatown, Los Angeles in March, 2015. The IAO was created to counterbalance what Wilson-Brown perceived as a lack of access and transparency in the fragrance industry.

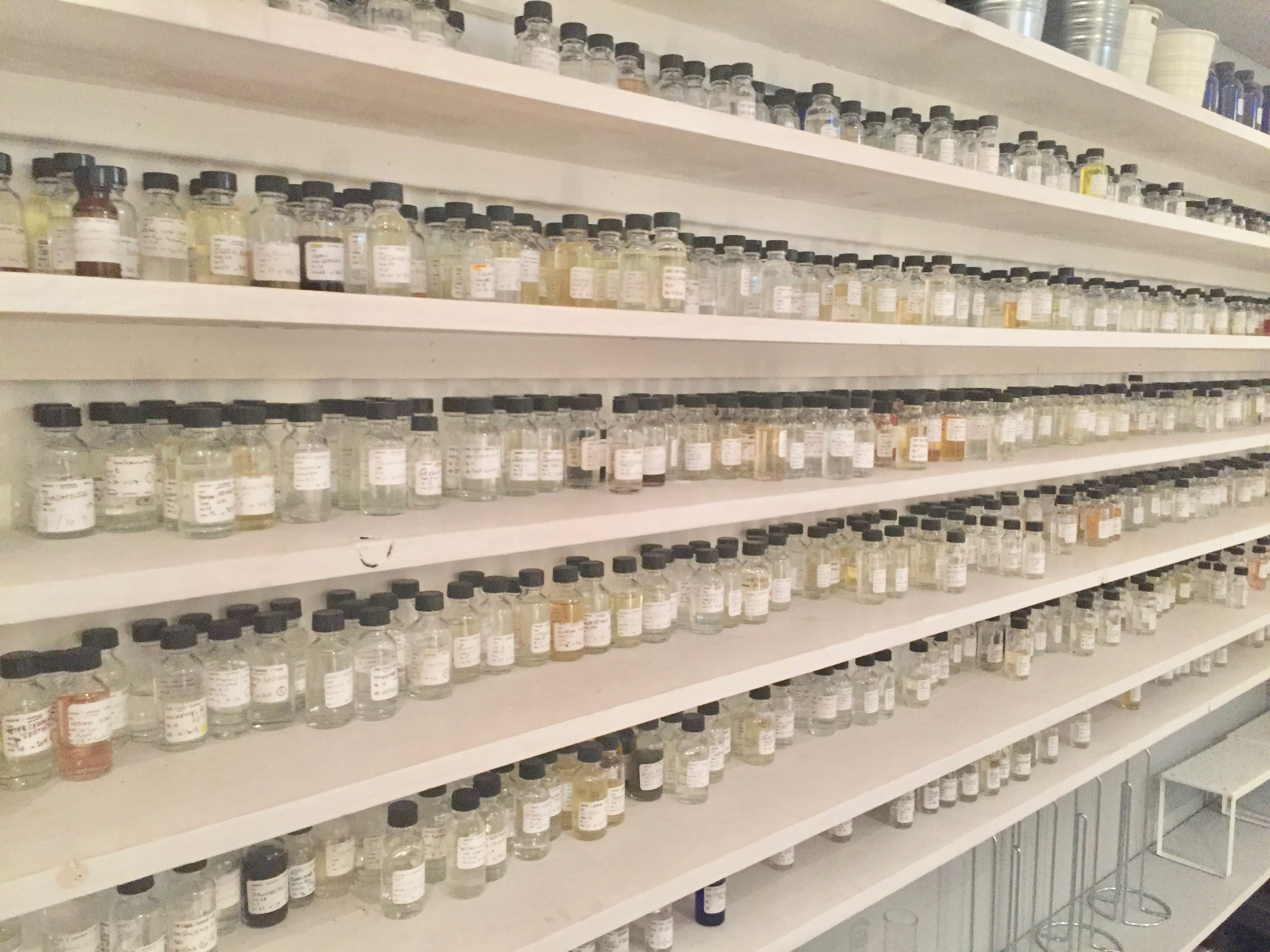
Hundreds of scent samples adorn a wall at the institute.

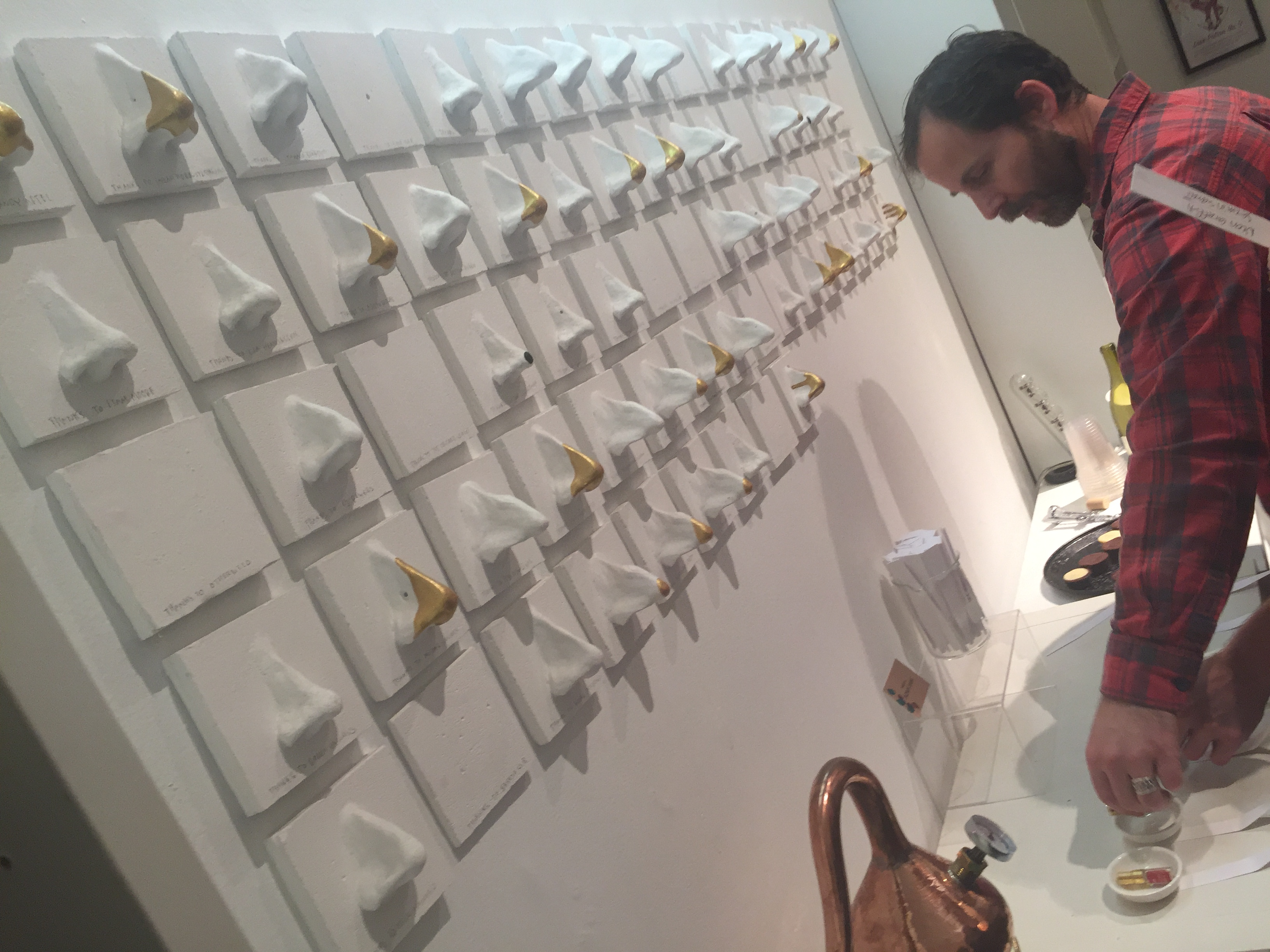
Molds of noses line one wall of the institute.

In January 2014, the IAO launched its first large-scale public arts project with 'A Trip to Japan in Sixteen Minutes, Revisited' at the Hammer Museum. It has since collaborated with Miles Regis, Zoe Crosher, Andrew Berardini, Austin Young, Marcos Lutyens, Bettina Hubby, dublab, Jo Burzynska, Cat Jones, Aleesa Cohene, Sean Raspet, Boris Raux, Volta, Snowblink, Erik Benjamins, Maxwell Williams, The Institute for New Feeling, Hilda Kozari, Machine Project, Public Fiction, Seth Bogart, Research for the Bermuda Triangle (Regina Mamou and Lara Salmon), Christy Gast, Esmeralda Kosmatopoulous, Fallen Fruit, and many more artists, writers, arts collectives, and musicians.

In April 2014, the IAO held the first annual Art and Olfaction Awards, a yearly awards mechanism designed to help celebrate excellence in independent and artisan perfumery. Subsequent award events were held at Goethe Institute Los Angeles, Hammer Museum, Silent Green Kulturquartier in Berlin, the Tabernacle in London, Oude Kerk in Amsterdam, Casa do Alentejo in Lisbon, Gazarte in Athens.

== Notable projects ==
- 'A Trip to Japan in Sixteen Minutes, Revisited' (2014): A collaboration led by the IAO, reimagining Sadakichi Hartmann's failed scent concert in New York in the early 20th century. Perfume compositions by Sherri Sebastian were propagated using an updated version of Sadakichi Hartmann's scent machine by Eric Vrymoed and Kamil Beski. The whole was elucidated by an audio composition by Bennett Barbakow with live foley by Barbakow and Julia Owen. Each guest left with a limited edition program designed by Micah Hahn. The installation/performance took place at Hammer Museum in January 2014.
- 'Manifest Destiny' (2013 - 2015): A project by Zoe Crosher, with scent creation by the IAO, where the IAO created iterative perfumes to accompany Crosher's billboard installations along the I-10, from Florida to California. The project was produced by Los Angeles Nomadic Division.
- 'The Eyes Are Always There' (2015): An installation by Joe Merrell at Machine Project in Los Angeles, where the IAO created a series of scents based on testimony from famous UFO abduction cases (including the Barney and Betty Hill abduction.)
- 'Scent of Mystery' (2015-2016): A collaborative re-imagining of the original Smell-O-Vision film, first screened at The National Media Museum in Bradford UK, The Danish Film Institute in Copenhagen Denmark, and The Arclight Cinerama Dome in Los Angeles during the TCM Classic Film Festival.
- Bienial Scent Fair: A three-day scent fair, co-curated with Darin Klein, featuring independent perfumers. The first event took place at Hammer Museum in 2016. Subsequent events took place at Craft Contemporary in Los Angeles.
- The Art and Olfaction Awards: A yearly award mechanism devoted to experimental, artisan and independent perfume practices, which launched in 2013 and had its first event in 2014.
- '24 Hours / 15 Scents' (2016): with the Pulitzer Arts Foundation in St. Louis, MO. with The Firecracker Press. The olfactory memories of 15 St. Louisans were translated into scent, and printed into a folio with texts by writer Eileen G'Sell.
- 'Love Potion No. 9' (2015): A collaborative smell-based speed-dating event with artist Bettina Hubby.
- 'Little Trees Mural' (2015): A large scale mural made entirely of Little Trees Air Fresheners, at Standard Hotel in Downtown Los Angeles.
- 'Art Olfaction Amsterdam' (2018): A pop-up laboratory in collaboration with Mediamatic, in Amsterdam.
- Scent Language Hackathon (2018): In collaboration with Mediamatic, Klara Ravat, Caro Verbeek, and Saskia Wilson-Brown, a weekend exploration of language and scent, inspired in part by Sissel Tolaas' work with NASALO.
- 'Van Eyck Reloaded' (2020): A collaboration with GLIMPS Biolab to create two scent compositions that illustrated important elements found in the Adoration of the Mystic Lamb panel of Van Eyck's Ghent Altarpiece (created in 1432).
- 'Experimental Scent Summit': An annual summit for olfactory art practitioners, researchers and perfumers, in collaboration with Smell Lab Berlin and Klara Ravat.
- Perfume Garden (2019-2021): A contemplation garden of aromatics serving the Bell Homeless Shelter in South Los Angeles, in partnership with GrowGood.
- 'Open Sourcing Smell Culture': A collaborative program explores alternative attribution and sharing strategies for the perfume industry. The program takes the shape of workshops and working groups, and will culminate with the publication of a set of recommendations for open source methodologies in scent creation, perfumery, and related practices. On the way, we will be collecting and publishing formulas, sharing information, and – in so doing – testing the feasibility for open source in the field of perfumery.
- Perfume on the Radio : A semi-monthly radio show and podcast exploring the cultures around perfumery, in partnership with dublab for Lookout FM.
- Sensory Mementos + Interstellar Soundings: Art installations that focus on the senses of smell, and sound, in collaboration between Saskia Wilson-Brown and Shane Myrbeck. Part of Blended Worlds: Experiments in Interplanetary Imagination, with Jet Propulsion Lab for Getty PST ART: Art & Science Collide festival.
- Ether: Aromatic Mythologies, an olfactory art exhibition featuring thirteen artists working with scent to explore mythology, at Craft Contemporary in Los Angeles.

== Purpose ==
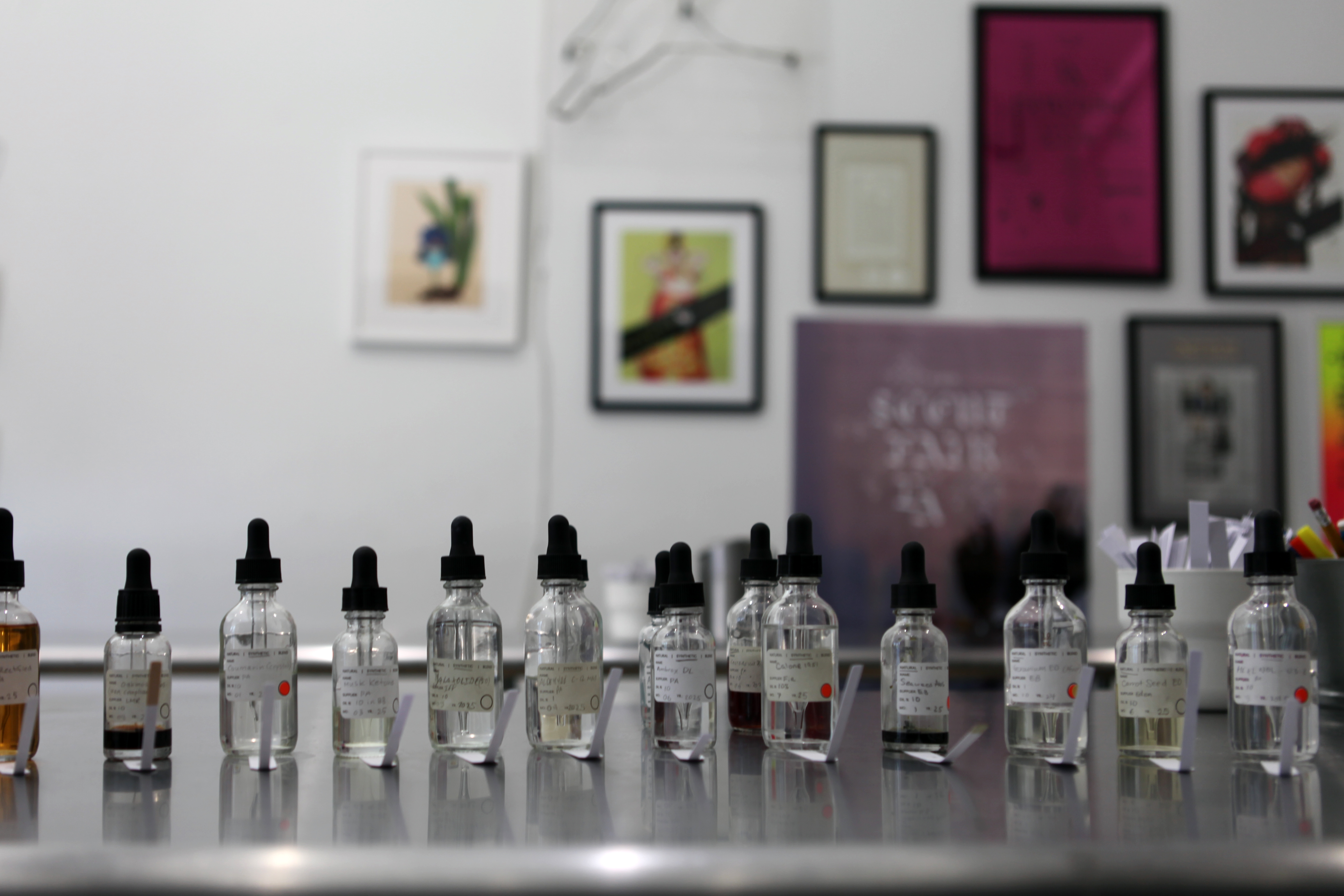
Bottles of aromatic materials on a table at the Institute for Art and Olfaction.

Part of The Institute for Art and Olfaction's mission is to create access to perfume education and materials, in line with Saskia Wilson-Brown's belief that perfumery is "inaccurately seen as elite." The result is that the IAO is considered "[...] one of the few places in the country where anyone can learn about the history and process of perfumery."

"[...] I found access to be extremely limited. [...] My approach is, 'Let's all learn together,' so I gathered the resources. And our weekly open-session workshops, part of our mission of creating access, welcome artists, designers, filmmakers, kids from East L.A., both men and women. [...] I am not particularly fascinated with perfume as a consumption project. My interest relates to my arts background. The institute is based on the potential to subvert the industry in some way to change how we think about luxury and beauty."

The IAO has hosted talks and events by guest speakers, and has presented workshops, classes or otherwise collaborated with The Getty Center, The Getty Villa, The Wallace Collection (UK), Otis College of Art and Design, Henry Art Gallery, The Natural History Museum Los Angeles, Fowler Museum at UCLA, Huntington Library and Gardens, Craft Contemporary, Pulitzer Arts Foundation, Jet Propulsion Lab, among others.

== The Institute for Art and Olfaction Gallery ==
The IAO Gallery hosts visual art, performative, and installation-based exhibitions from artists working with perfume or olfaction in their fine arts practice. The shape and location of the IAO gallery form has changed over the years, mainly in response to the space that the IAO itself has occupied. From 2016, IAO Gallery occupies a 154 square foot room located within the Institute for Art and Olfaction in Chinatown, as well as two window display spaces facing the pedestrian street.

Past exhibitions at the IAO Gallery have highlighted work by artists working with scent in the context of their fine arts practice. Select artists have included Joe Merrell (USA), Sarana Mehra (UK), Christopher Brosius (USA), Lucy Chinen and Sean Raspet (USA), Carrie Paterson (USA), Cristian Marianciuc (Romania), Volta (USA), Boris Raux (France), Klara Ravat (Germany/Spain), Susu Attar (USA), Terry Braunstein (USA), Bruno Fazzolari (USA), Miles Regis (USA), Sarah Baker (UK), Esmeralda Kosmatopoulos (Greece), Jo Burzynska (New Zealand), Nicola Vruwink (USA), Micah Hahn (USA), Erik Benjamins (USA), Christy Gast (USA) and Ensayos (Argentina), Cat Jones (Australia), Ben Chase (USA), Hilda Kozari (Finland), Franco Castilla (USA).

Additionally, the IAO Gallery has collaborated with Craft Contemporary in Los Angeles, and has worked with guest curators like German scholar Urs Staheli, Portuguese perfumer and writer Miguel Matos, and academic and gallerist Andreas Keller, among others.

== IAO Collections ==
In 2021, perfume collector and writer Conor McTeague bequeathed his collection of historic perfumes to the Institute for Art and Olfaction. This gift became the foundation for the IAO Collections, which were started to create an accessible archive of perfumes, books and raw aromatic materials. In the spirit of public access, the Institute for Art and Olfaction staff created a public spreadsheet listing all the items in the collection, broken into three categories: Books and paper ephemera, perfumes, and reference aromatics.

This effort was designed to create another point of access for people curious about working with scent, and support other efforts such as Osmothèque in Versailles, Aftel Archive for Curious Scents created by Mandy Aftel in Berkeley, the Annette Green Fragrance Archive at FIDM in Los Angeles, The Perfume Museum by Reem Abu Issa in Doha, Qatar, and others.
