= Eternal Telethon =

- Established: 2009
- Location: nomadic
- Founder: Ina Viola Blasius, John Burtle, Akina Cox, Chad Dilley, and Niko Solorio
- Website: www.eternaltelethon.com

Eternal Telethon is an open collective working to establish an artist retirement home at the Salton Sea by hosting "live" webcast. Founded in 2009 by Ina Viola Blasius, John Burtle, Akina Cox, Chad Dilley, and Niko Solorio the Eternal Telethon has featured over 200 artist. Notable Eternal Telethon projects have included "the Future is Eternal" which was part of CalArts 40th anniversary, the twenty-four-hour broadcast "Infinity + 24" at Machine Project, "Eternal Service" at the Church of Public Fiction with Signify, Sanctify, Believe the Hammer Museum with KChungTV, and "Our Work is Never Done" which was part of the USC MPAS curated exhibition "Work After Work". In the catalog for the Work After Work Zemula Barr describes the project saying "Although seemingly tongue and cheek, the collective's goal is to initiate an artist's retirement home is very real and points to the lack of structural and economic support available to artist, many who struggle to meet ends meet with part time employment and a lack of health benefits."
