= Los Angeles Road Concerts =

American arts collective

Los Angeles Road Concerts is an arts collective that exhibits site-specific performances, installations, readings, lectures, and carpool happenings shown in the numerous sections of ignored or disused public space that make up the sidewalks in Los Angeles. Six events have taken place since 2008, along San Fernando Road, Washington Boulevard, Sunset Boulevard, Mulholland Drive, in Downtown Los Angeles and Culver City. Over 300 artists have shown work in the events, which invited artists to submit through a wide call for submissions process in which no one is rejected. Past participating artists included Marnie Weber, Julia Holter, Elliot Reed, Jay Lynn Gomez, Zackary Drucker, Kate Durbin, Christine Wang, Margaret Wappler, Fallen Fruit, Eric Lindley, Pau Pescador, Austin Young, Todd Gray, John Kilduff, West Hollywood city councilmember John D'Amico, Julie Tolentino, Marc Horowitz, Tangowerk, Sheree Rose, James Rojas, Margie Schnibbe and John Burtle. The collective was founded in 2008 by Stephen van Dyck.

== See also ==
- Curatorial platform
- Public art
- Public space
- Art intervention
- Artist-run space
- Alternative exhibition space
- Happening
- Interactive art
- Street installations
- Guerrilla theater
- Guerrilla gardening
- Creative Time
