= Richard J. Arnold =

American photographer (1876–1955)

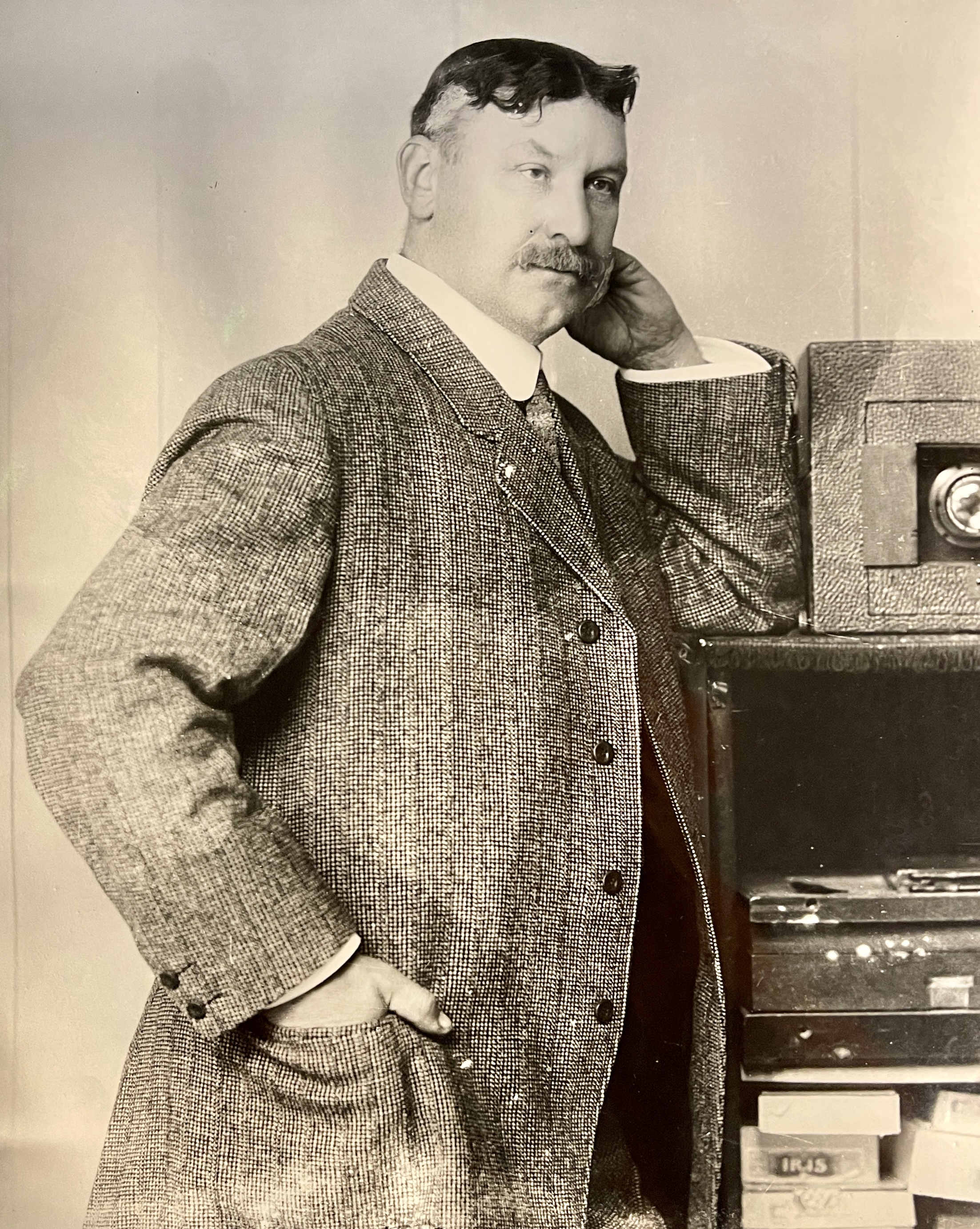
- Arnold with camera
- Born: Richard John Arnold; June 28, 1856; England
- Died: May 19, 1929 (aged 72); Monterey, California, US
- Occupation: Photographer
- Years active: 1883-1924
- Known for: Official photographer of Hotel Del Monte

Richard J. Arnold (June 28, 1856 – May 19, 1929), also known as R. J. Arnold, was an English American 19th-century pioneer of early California photography. He is known for his large-format glass-plate photography and as the designated photographer for the Hotel Del Monte in Monterey, California. He created one of the earliest and largest portrait collections of the early Latino community in California.

== Early life ==
R. J. Arnold was born on June 28, 1856, in England. At age 16, he came to New York and eventually settled on California's Central Coast.

== Career ==
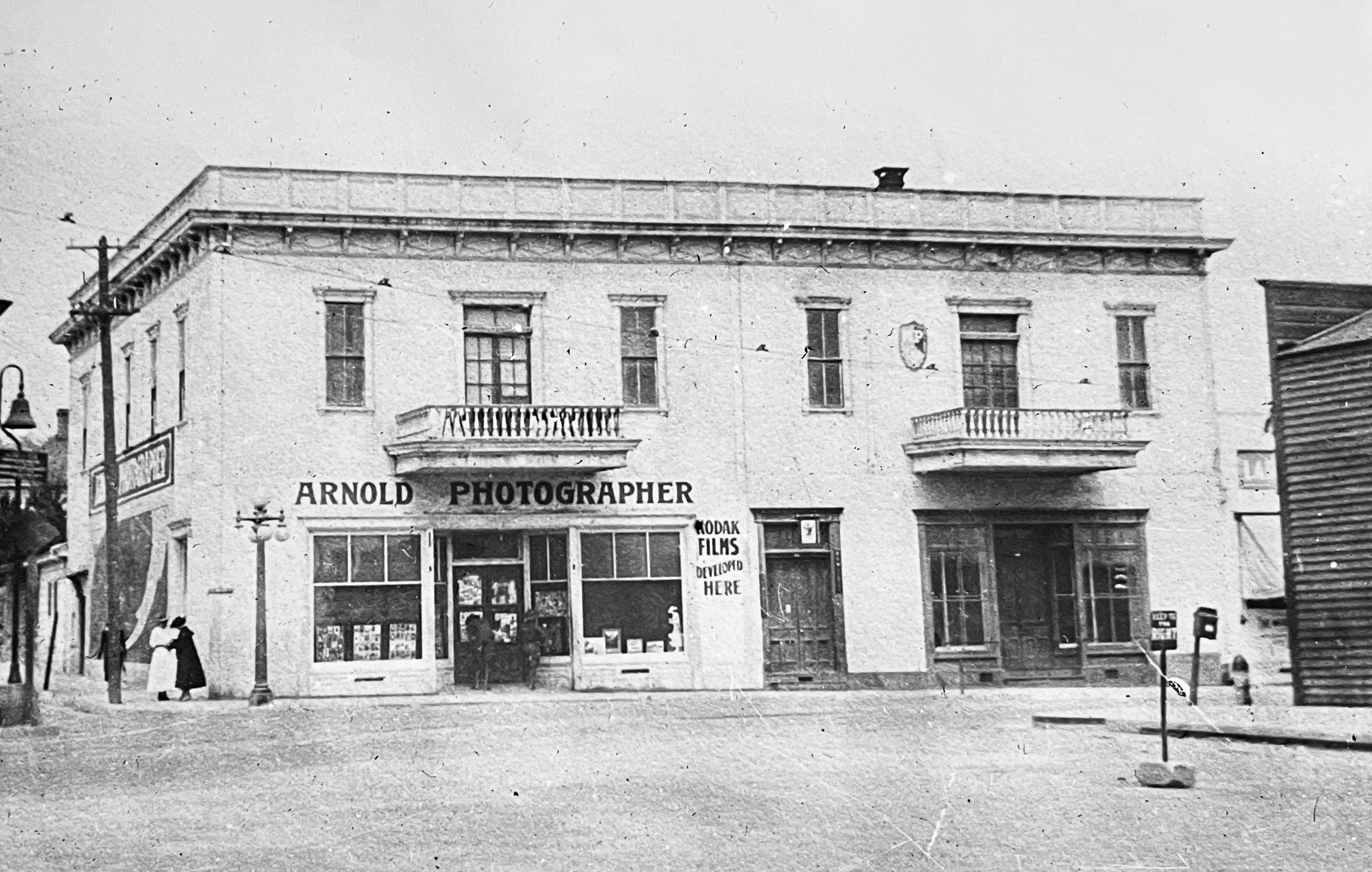
Arnold Photo studio in the Alvarado adobe on the southwest corner of Alvarado and Pearl Streets in Monterey, California

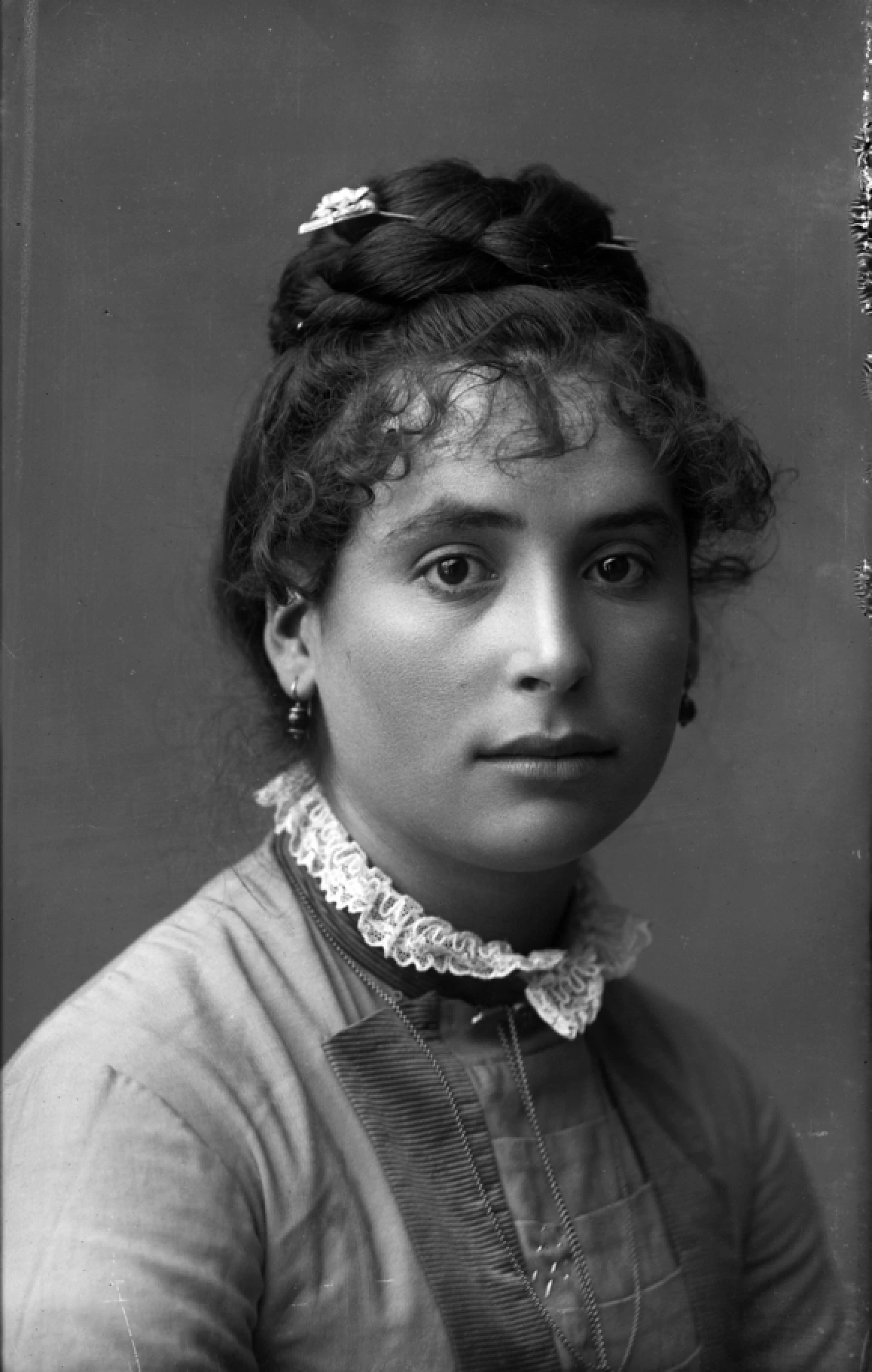
Portrait of an unnamed woman, exhibited in California Unedited! The Archives of R.J. Arnold at Paris Photo

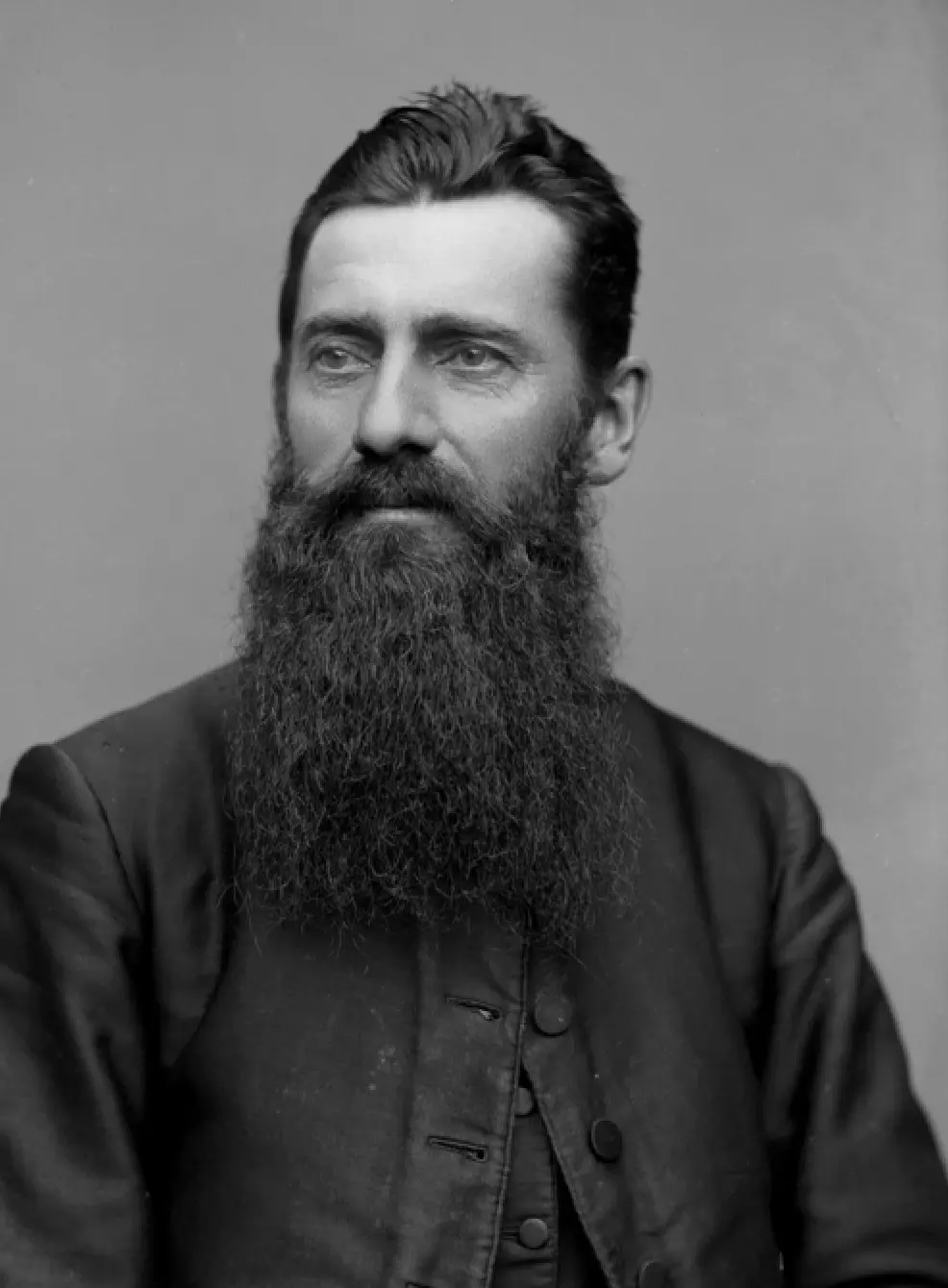
Glass plate negative by R.J. Arnold

Arnold opened studios in San Luis Obispo, California from about 1883 to 1896. In 1889, his studio was opposite Sinsheimer's store. In July 1896 Arnold's Photograph Gallery on Higuera Street was destroyed in a fire. Arnold had other studios in Santa Barbara and Alameda.

Arnold's work included large-format glass-plate and real photo postcard of early adobes, the California missions, and the California coastal region. He contributed to early California photography with one of the first portrait collections of California's Latino and Native American communities, which captured the diverse population of San Luis Obispo County in the late 1800s. His works covered early celebrities. Others include Queen Liliʻuokalani of the Hawaiian Islands.

In 1901, Arnold moved to the Monterey Peninsula to succeed C. W. J. Johnson as the designated photographer for the Hotel Del Monte from 1902 to 1924. This let him capture the elegance of the hotel and its guests. Arnold's tenure there continued until 1924, when he was succeeded by Julian P. Graham. His photographs of Monterey were showcased in Julie Cain's 2005 book Monterey's Hotel Del Monte, California. The Arnold Photo studio was in the Alvarado adobe, now a California Historical Landmark, on the southwest corner of Alvarado and Pearl Streets in Monterey.

In 2011, the Paso Robles Historical Society received over 2,000 glass-plate negatives from Jacqueline D. Marie, discovered at a yard sale by Randal Gene Young. Marie loaned them to the Society, stipulating that they remain within the county and not be used for economic purposes. A selection was presented at the 2013 exhibition Shared Histories: R.J. Arnold's Photographs of the Central Coast at the Carnegie Library in Paso Robles, California. The San Luis Obispo History Center exhibited these images from spring 2014 to March 2015 in Windows to the Past: Photographs by Richard Arnold, 1883 to 1887.

In 2015, Arnold's photographs were exhibited in Shared Histories II: More of R.J. Arnold's Portraits of the Central Coast in Paso Robles, and California Unedited! The Archives of R.J. Arnold at the Paris Photo international art fair in Los Angeles. The latter was organized by Anthony Lepore, assisted by Julien Fryedman.

In 2022 and 2023, the Paso Robles City Library exhibited a selection from the Paso Robles Historical Society's collection of Arnold, in Photographic Look into Our Past.

== Death and legacy ==
Arnold died at the Monterey County hospital on May 19, 1929.

== See also ==
- List of American photographers
- Photography in the United States of America
