= Marcos Lutyens =

British artist

- Born: 1964 (age 61–62)
- Occupations: Interdisciplinary artist, author
- Website: https://www.lutyens.com/

Marcos Lutyens (born 1964) is a British interdisciplinary artist and author based in Los Angeles, California.

== Work ==
Lutyens' projects are exhibited internationally, centering around explorations of sensory perception and the unconscious mind. He frequently uses hypnosis as part of his performances. Lutyens collaborates with artists, writers, and scientists on his projects. His interests in sensory perception and synesthesia have led him to collaborate with neuroscientist Richard Cytowic. He has also worked closely with The Institute for Art and Olfaction on various projects, using specially created scents to enhance and deepen the experience of his performance works. In addition, Lutyens has worked extensively with sensory-impaired communities, including the Association of Persons with Visual Impairments in Turkey and the Latvian Society of the Blind. Lutyens has collaborated with organizations including Vision Forum, the International Association of Synaesthetes, Artists, and Scientists.

=== CO_{2}morrow (2009) ===
CO_{2}morrow is a reactive sculpture, first shown at the Royal Academy of Arts in London as a part of the show “Earth: Art of a Changing World” in 2009. The project was created in collaboration with artist Alessandro Marianantoni and climate scientist Andrew Manning. The sculpture was created almost entirely out of carbon fiber and is modeled after a scrubber molecule that takes CO_{2} out of the air. The sculpture is also covered in LED lights that react in real-time to data received from a network of sensing technologies in the United Kingdom. After its showing at the Royal Academy of Arts, CO_{2}morrow was moved to Seaton Delaval Hall, on the northeast coast of England.

=== Hypnotic Show (2012) ===
Hypnotic Show is an evolving project created in collaboration with Raimundas Malašauskas. It has been shown in various iterations, performed at Documenta (13), in Kassel, Germany, in 2012. Performances of the Hypnotic Show at Documenta (13) were held in a cabin specially designed by Lutyens called the Reflecting Room. A near-exact reflected replica of the upper cabin was installed below so that the floor of the cabin appeared to be covered by a mirror. In this mirrored space, Lutyens held 340 hypnotic performances over 100 days with 7,000 people in attendance. The scripts for these performances were adapted from Raimundas Malašauskas’ book, Paper Exhibition, along with contributions from various artists. Special scents, designed by Sissel Tolaas, were released into the space to deepen the experience.

An instance of the Hypnotic Show was performed at the Solomon R. Guggenheim Museum in New York City as a part of the exhibition Tales of Our Time in 2017. A video was also produced along with this performance.

=== Color Therapy (2014) ===
Color Therapy is an installation presented on large LED screens simultaneously in six cities around the world over a year. The project was presented in Times Square (New York), Piccadilly Circus (London) Amsterdam, Milan, Toronto, and Singapore in 2014. Short 60-second films were played on the screens, reacting in real-time to local weather data. The colors of each film are related to an inverse of the current weather, creating emotional warmth when it’s cold, wet, or windy, and a feeling of calm when it’s hot, dry, or still. An iteration of the project was presented as Soma Chroma at Piccadilly Circus and Dubai Dubia at Zayed University in Dubai as a part of ISEA 2014, and K-Tanglement in New York, Toronto, Milan, and Amsterdam.

=== Neurathian Bootstrap (2015) ===
Neurathian Bootstrap is a multimedia installation displayed in 2015 at the 14th Istanbul Biennial, “SALTWATER: A Theory of Thought Forms” curated by Carolyn Christov-Bakargiev. The entire piece was housed inside and as a part of a two-story boat. The title of the project derives from Neurath’s boat, a metaphor central to anti-foundational explanations of knowledge, first formulated by the Austrian philosopher Otto Neurath. Lutyens used various objects to reframe sensory experiences: Chladni plates show the sound of the voices of a blind community that Lutyens collaborated with; large sea stones and their ceramic casts present a similarity to “braille” of the sea. The hypnotic scripts for the project were derived from three novels, Asli Erdoğan’s The City in Crimson Cloak (1998), J.G. Ballard’s The Crystal World (1966), and René Daumal’s Mount Analog (1952). Lutyens also presented video pieces he created about impossible colors that are not usually perceivable between red and green, yellow and blue.

=== Phobophobia (2017) ===
Phobophobia was performed at “ATARAXIA,” curated by Koyo Kouoh, for the Salon Suisse at the 57th Venice Biennale in 2017. The performance uses hypnotism along with specially designed sculptures to open up and release fear through the process of discharge. By externalizing fear, Lutyens sought to assist visitors in releasing trauma as it exists in the body. Throughout the performance, special smells designed by Stephen Douthwaite were released to transition the frame of mind, enhancing and furthering the goals of the hypnotic induction.

=== The Inductive Museum (2019) ===
The Inductive Museum was a performance piece presented at the Culture Summit in Abu Dhabi in 2019. Hypnotized visitors engage in a variety of sensory experiences, including touch, smell, and sight, to elicit visions of a museum that exists within the psyche.

=== Rose River Memorial (2023) ===
Rose River Memorial is a public art installation commemorating the lives lost to COVID-19. Lutyens and the writer and scholar Tilly Hinton started it. In a process of collective grieving, members of the public create handmade roses out of felt, which are hung together on netting at the memorial. Each rose corresponds to a life lost. The first location of the project was installed in Boyle Heights, a neighbourhood in East Los Angeles heavily impacted by the virus.

== Literature ==
Lutyens wrote a book recounting his Documenta (13) experience titled 100 Days: Memoirs of a Hypnotist, published by Sternberg Press.
