= KCHUNG Radio =

KChung Radio
Chinatown, Los Angeles, California; United States
- Frequency: 1630 kHz

Programming
- Format: community radio

History
- First air date: March 2011

Links
- Webcast: Listen live
- Website: kchungradio.org

KChung Radio is a freeform radio station in the Chinatown neighborhood of Los Angeles as KChung Radio 1630 AM. KCHUNG broadcasts over 200 shows a month on 1630 AM and online through the station's website. The station operates under the Federal Communications Commission's Part 15 rules, which cover very-low-power transmissions that do not require a license.

== History ==
KCHUNG Radio was started by Solomon Bothwell in 2011. Harsh Patel created the initial graphic design, and Luke Fischbeck helped with programming. The station's first broadcast was in March 2011. KCHUNG has hosted many artists, musicians, poets, and has a reputation for hosting programming that might not be allowed on other stations. While KCHUNG now has a stable location, it continues its nomadic beginnings broadcasting at locations around Los Angeles including The Hammer Museum, LACMA, The Smell, Ooga Booga, Public Fiction, Night Gallery, Pehr Space, MOCA, and the LA Anarchist Bookfair.

KCHUNG participated in the UCLA Hammer Museum's Made in L.A. 2014 exhibition. For Made in L.A. 2014, KCHUNG Radio created a subsidiary television network KCHUNG TV. KCHUNG TV was a fifteen-week series of livestream video programs shot live in the museum. KCHUNG TV featured content by the KCHUNG community.

In 2016, KCHUNG received a Creative Capital Emerging Field Award for their project News Body.

== Notable shows ==
Some notable shows include Mark Foster's FOS FM Jennifer Moon's Adventures Within, Max Maslansky's Riffin, Gabie Strong's Crystalline Morphologies, Nicolas G. Miller and Steve Kado's The Talking Show, and Yelena Zhelezov's Tractor. Christina Gubala (aka Lady C) hosts Slamdunx from the Free Throw Line, a music and basketball show, and Michael Piña's hosts a science show titled Nature Boy. Brian Chernick also hosts News Beat, a bi-weekly mix of community news and local music. Other notable show hosts include Laura Owens, Brendan Fowler, John Burtle, Guan Rong, Johnnie Jungleguts, Ian James, Meredith Carter, Stephen van Dyck, Kelly Mark, Earl Sweatshirt, Emerson Dameron, Jason Dill, Fiona Connor, A.L. Steiner, Adam Papagan, Guru Rugu, Alison Rosenfeld, and Evan Walsh.
