= Gabie Strong =

American interdisciplinary artist

Gabie Strong is an interdisciplinary artist, experimental guitarist, noise musician and community organizer based in Los Angeles.

== Biography ==
Strong was born in Denver, Colorado and grew up in Los Angeles, California. She first got involved in the city's arts and music scenes as a teenager, authoring the Kitten Kore zine, which was mentioned in Kurt Cobain's Journals, and playing in various riot grrl bands such as Pussywillow and Canopy in the early 90's. In the latter part of that decade, she became involved with the city's experimental music community, focusing on bass and guitar by the late 90's, using the instrument as a means of eliciting layered feedback and drones, influenced by such acts as The Dead C, Skullflower, and Sunn O))). She received her BA in Art from UCLA, her MFA in Art at UC Irvine, and an MArch at the Southern CA Institute of Architecture. She currently teaches Community Radio at the Otis College Of Art And Design.

== Career ==
In 2011, Strong began the Crystalline Morphologies show on KCHUNG Radio. The show would eventually expand into an imprint for the release of her own solo noise and in 2018, began its mission of releasing music from women, trans, and gender nonconforming artists. Since then, the label has released music by White Boy Scream, Shelter Death, Geneva Skeen, and Johanna Hedva, in addition to her own work.

In 2016, Strong released two full-length LP’s, Sacred Datura/Peaked Experience and Spectress. She followed these up with the cassettes Incantations, Vol. 1 and My Body Did This To Me on The Tapeworm, a tape-only sub-label of Touch. She frequently performs live both solo and as a collaborated with Pauline Lay, Christopher Reid Martin (Shelter Death, Rotary ECT, CGRSM), John Pearson, Joe Potts/LAFMS, Anna Homler, Jorge Martin, Elaine Carey (Telecaves, Rogue Squares), Ted Byrnes, Raquel Gutiérrez, Tom Watson, Jared Stanley and Matthew Hebert. In 2016, she, along with Christopher Reid Martin, toured as a member of Michael Morley’s project Gate on his U.S. tour with Ramleh. She has also contributed source material to Liz Harris’ 2019 Nivhek album After Its Own Death/Walking In A Spiral Towards The House. Strong was also a member of the collective Lady Noise from 2012 through 2015.

Her visual work and installations have been exhibited at the Hammer Museum, MOCA, the Los Angeles Contemporary Archive, the Pasadena Armory Center for the Arts, the Mount Wilson Observatory, Sierra Nevada College, Pitzer College Art Galleries, High Desert Test Sites, LACMA, the MAK Center for Art and Architecture, and Jabberjaw.

== Selected discography ==
Solo

- Mineralism (2016)
- Sacred Datura/Peaked Experience (2016)
- Spectress (2016)
- Incantations, Vol. 1 (2018)
- My Body Did This To Me (2020)

Collaborative

- Ps001 (with David L. Patton and Ron Russell) (1998)

with Canopy

- Split 7” with Seesaw (1993)

with Lady Noise

- Mixtape, Vol. 1 (2012)
- Lady Noise (2015)
