= Fallen Fruit =

Contemporary art collective

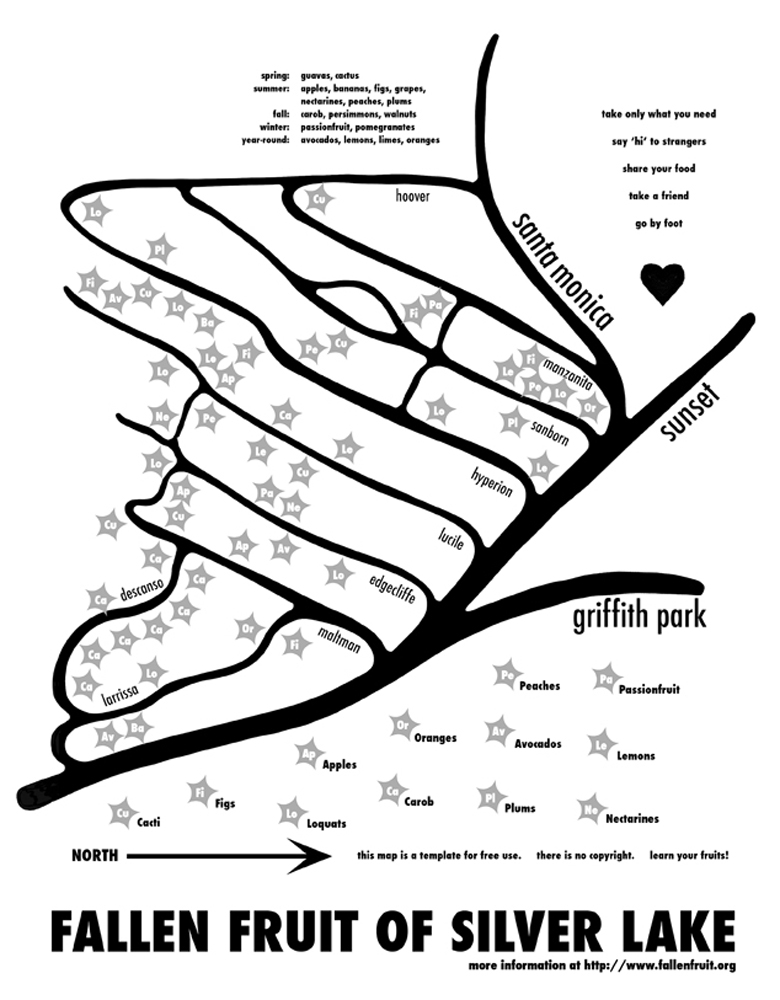
- Fallen Fruit, Elysian Park, 2005
- Born: Los Angeles, California, USA
- Known for: Contemporary Art
- Notable work: Theater of the Sun (2019), Endless Orchard (2013-present), Public Fruit Jams (2005–present), Lemonade Stand (2013-present), Fallen Fruit Factory (2013-present)
- Movement: Social Practice
- Awards: 2013 Creative Capital Grantee, Emerging Fields; 2013 Emerging Fields, Muriel Pollia Foundation Awardee, 2013 Atlas Award
- Website: fallenfruit.org

Fallen Fruit is a Los Angeles based artists' collaboration composed of David Allen Burns and Austin Young. The project was originally conceived by David Allen Burns, Matias Viegener and Austin Young in 2004. Since 2013, David and Austin have continued the collaborative work installing public artworks and participating in exhibitions worldwide. Using photography and video as well as performance and installation art, Fallen Fruit's work focuses on urban space, neighborhood, located citizenship and community and their relationship to the public realm.

== History and Background ==
Taking their name from the book of Leviticus (Lv 19:9-10), Fallen Fruit began in 2004 as a response to a call by The Journal of Aesthetics and Protest for artists' projects that addressed social or political issues but did so in the form of proposing a solution rather than raising a critique. In 2008, as part of their participation in "The Gatherers" show at the Yerba Buena Center for the Arts, the group embarked on a new long-term project called "The Colonial History of Fruit". Using a variety of media, this work examines both the objective or factual history of fruit – how the fruit we eat traveled through time and space to arrive in our daily life – and the subjective or anecdotal history: how and when an individual first tasted a fruit, or how a certain tree was tended by one family, or remembered by immigrants.

== Collaboration ==
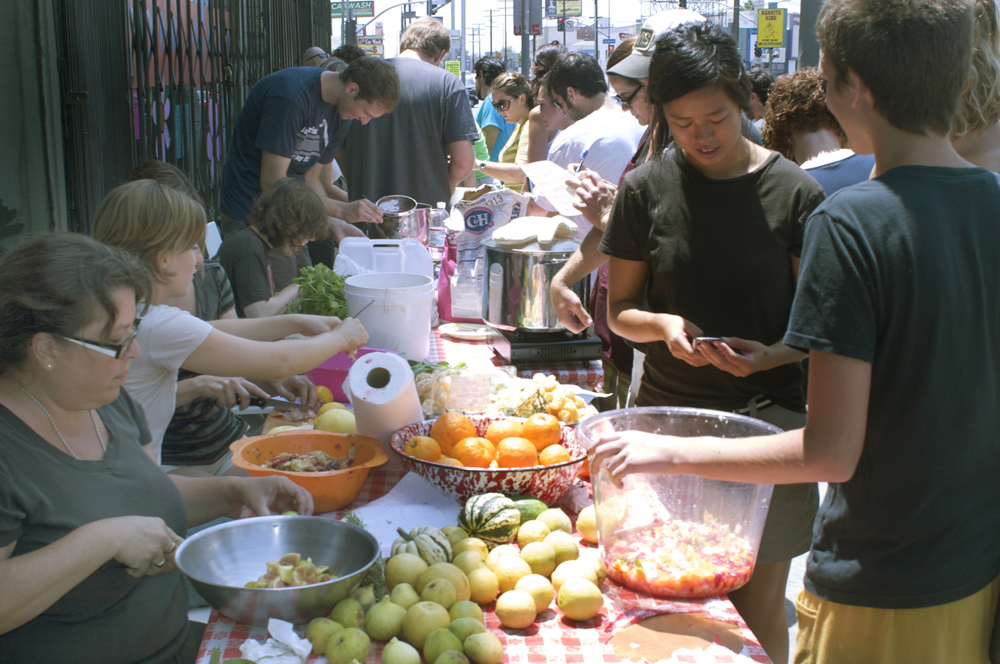
Public Fruit Jam at Machine Project

Held several times a year, Public Fruit Jams are an open invitation to the "citizens" of the city to bring their home-grown or publicly picked fruit and join in a communal jam-making session, using the term "jam" as a riff on both the food and the idea of musical improvisation.

Originally initiated in relation to a project with the Santa Barbara Museum of Art in 2013, Lemonade Stand, activates the phrase... “when life gives you lemons…” through public engagement. In his recurring project, participants are given glasses of organic lemonade in exchange for drawing a self-portrait onto a lemon with black marker and allowing their portrait to be taken. Collectively the lemon self-portraits are meant to create new forms of "public" and temporary micro-communities that illustrate some of the archetypes of society through their varied forms.

In 2013 Fallen Fruit created the Fruitique!, a collaborative, site-specific art installation, exhibition and retail space in conjunction with the Hammer Museum's Arts Re:STORE LA 2050 project.

== Public fruit ==
Fallen Fruit first coined the term "public fruit" in 2004 in order to explore the concept of fruit found growing in or overhanging public space, especially after noticing how people were reluctant to pick or eat fruit found this way. They were struck not only by how few people eat this fruit, but by how few people walk on neighborhood streets at all; Los Angeles is a city of cars. Fallen Fruit expanded upon this in 2013 with the opening of Del Aire Fruit Park, California's first public fruit park.

This was further expanded in 2014, with the start of Urban Fruit Trail, the pilot project for Endless Orchard, Fallen Fruit's global-scale public art project, which will transform often under-served areas with a network of public walking trails lined by fruit trees. In total, 150 trees will be planted in the MacArthur Park/Westlake region of Los Angeles, in collaboration with Heart of Los Angeles (HoLA), an urban youth outreach group. Once mature, the trees will bear gratis, year-round produce including plums, peaches, pomegranates, persimmons, lemons, limes, oranges and kumquats. 30 of the initial trees planted in Lafayette Park were destroyed by vandalism in July 2014, but they were quickly re-planted thanks to generous donations by the local community.

== Exhibitions ==
- Los Angeles Contemporary Exhibitions (2009) *Los Angeles County Museum of Art (2010)
- Collaboration with Islands of LA in the San Fernando Road Concert (2008).

== Publications and Press ==
Fallen fruit has been featured in LA weekly's Best of LA Art 2019, 15 Los Angeles Artists to Watch (ARTNEWS, January 2019), Artforum (Critic's Pick); The New York Times; LA Times, Conde Nast Traveler, and LA Confidential.

== Images ==
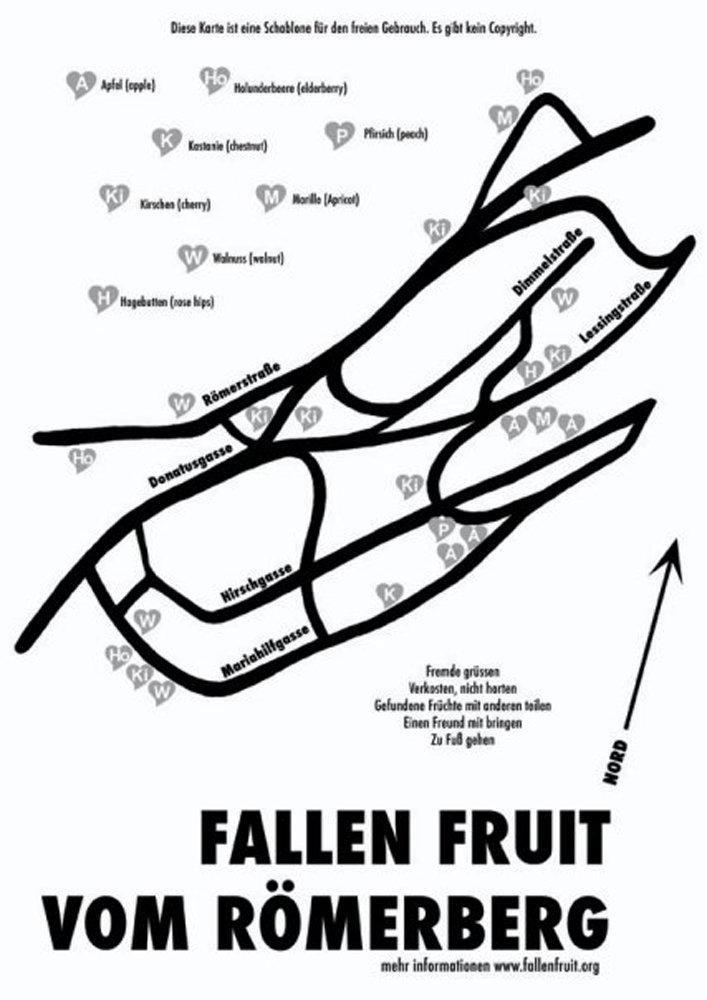
Public Fruit Map, Linz, Austria, 2008

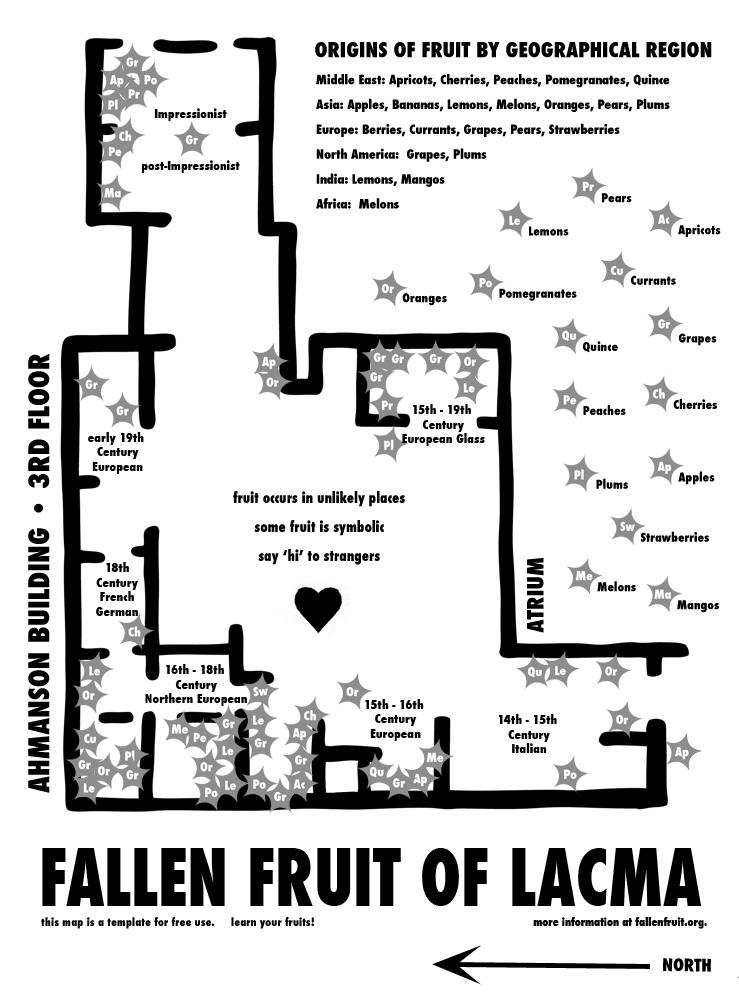
Public Fruit Map, Los Angeles County Museum of Art, 2008

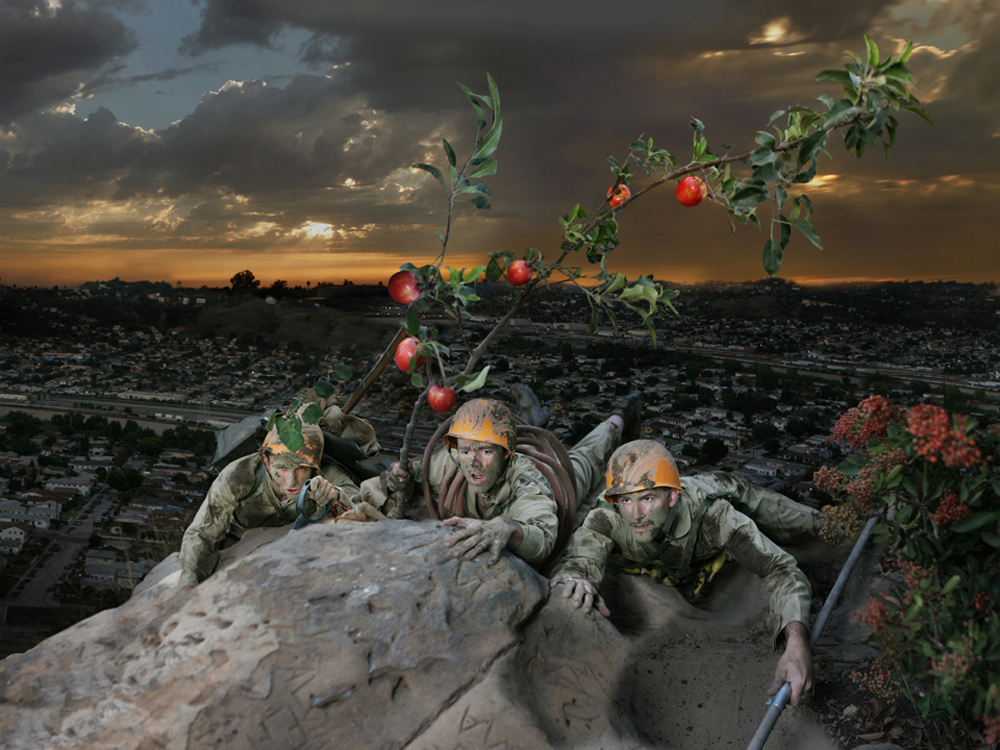

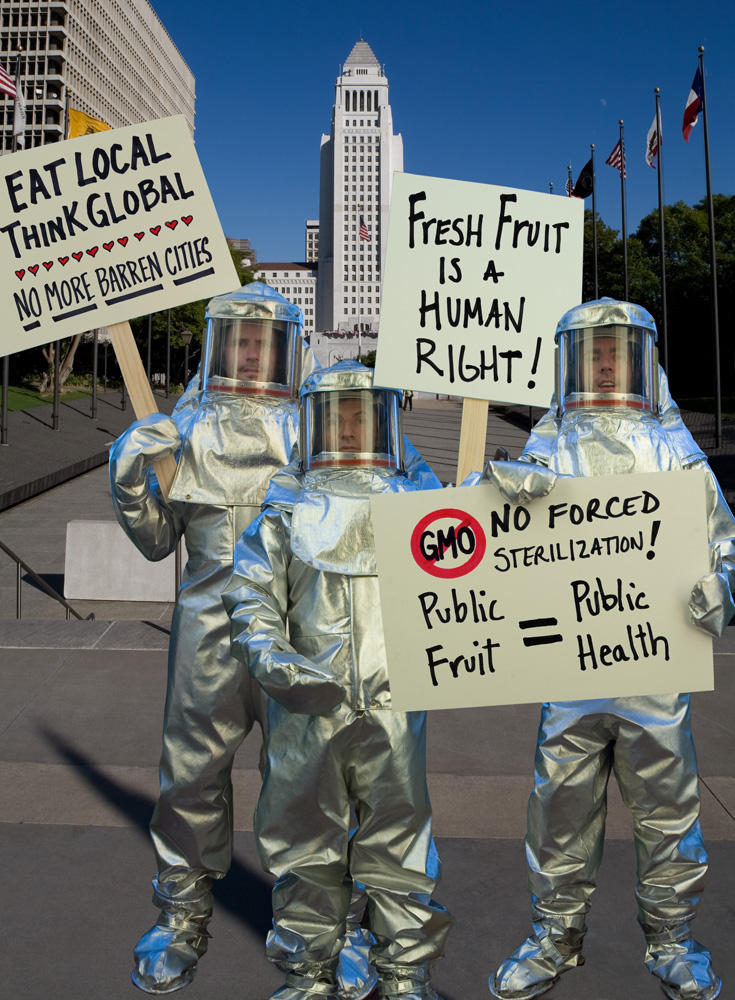
City Hall / Fruit Protest, 2005

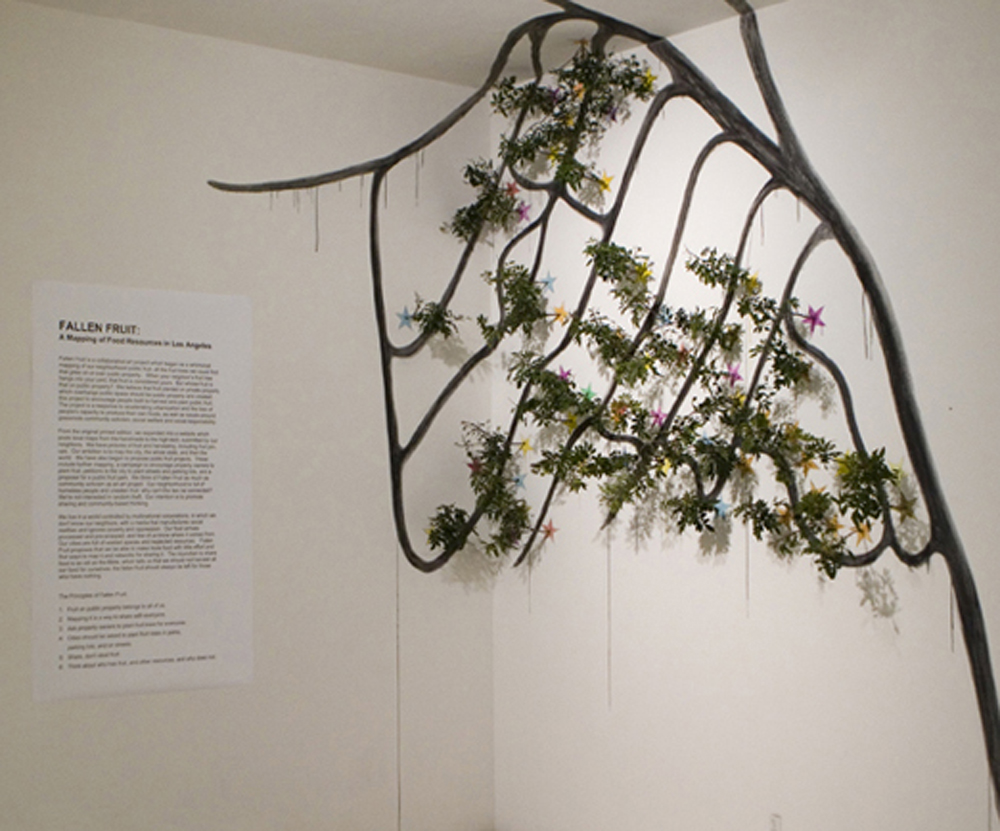
Public Fruit Map Mural, Los Angeles Contemporary Exhibitions, 2005

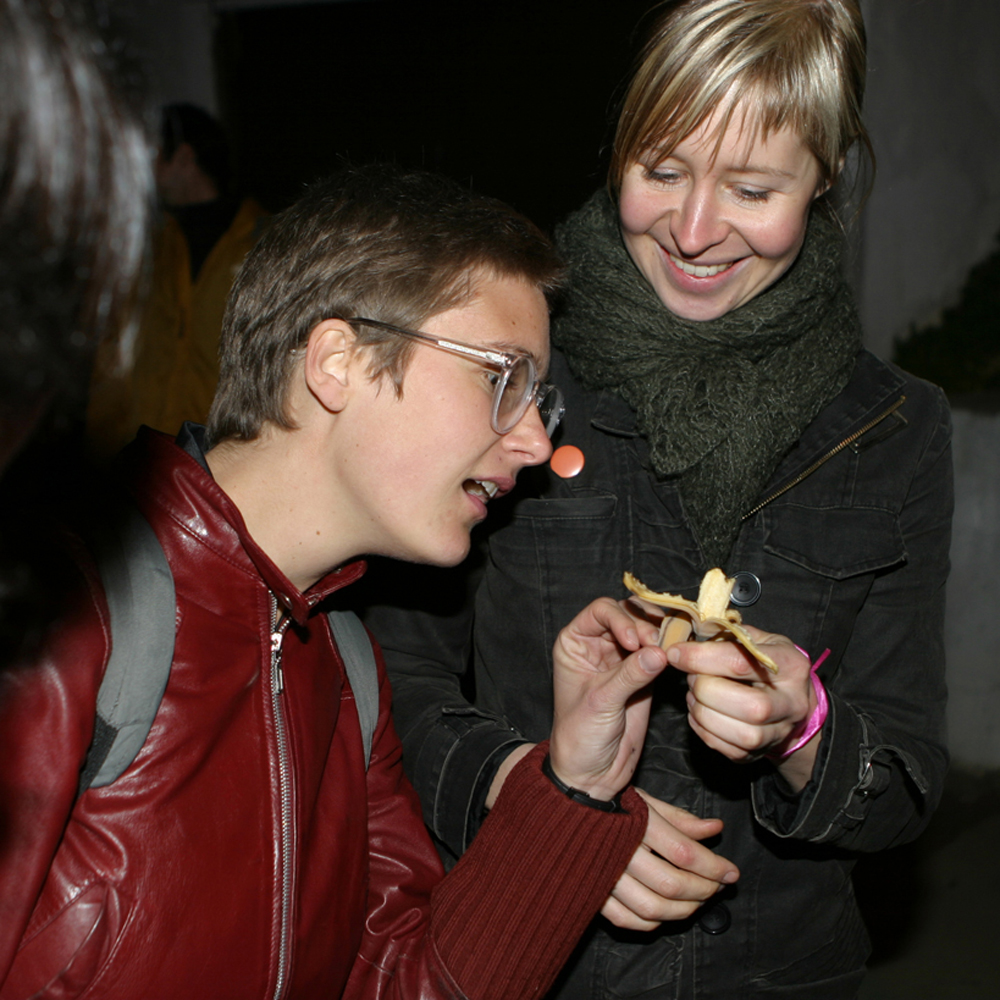
Nocturnal Fruit Forage, Silver Lake, California, 2005

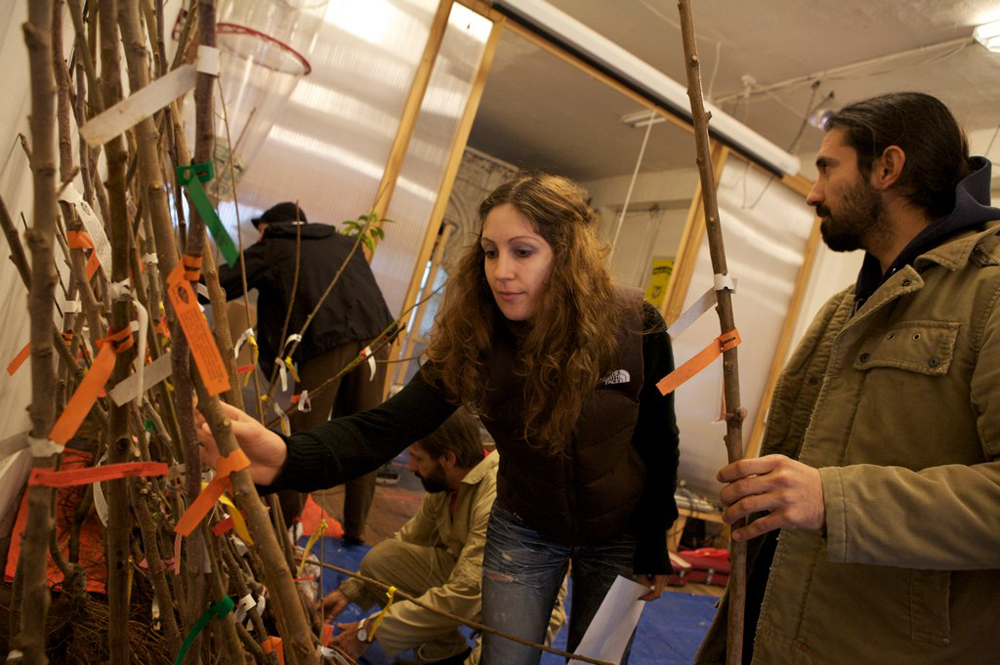
Fallen Fruit Tree Adoption, 2009

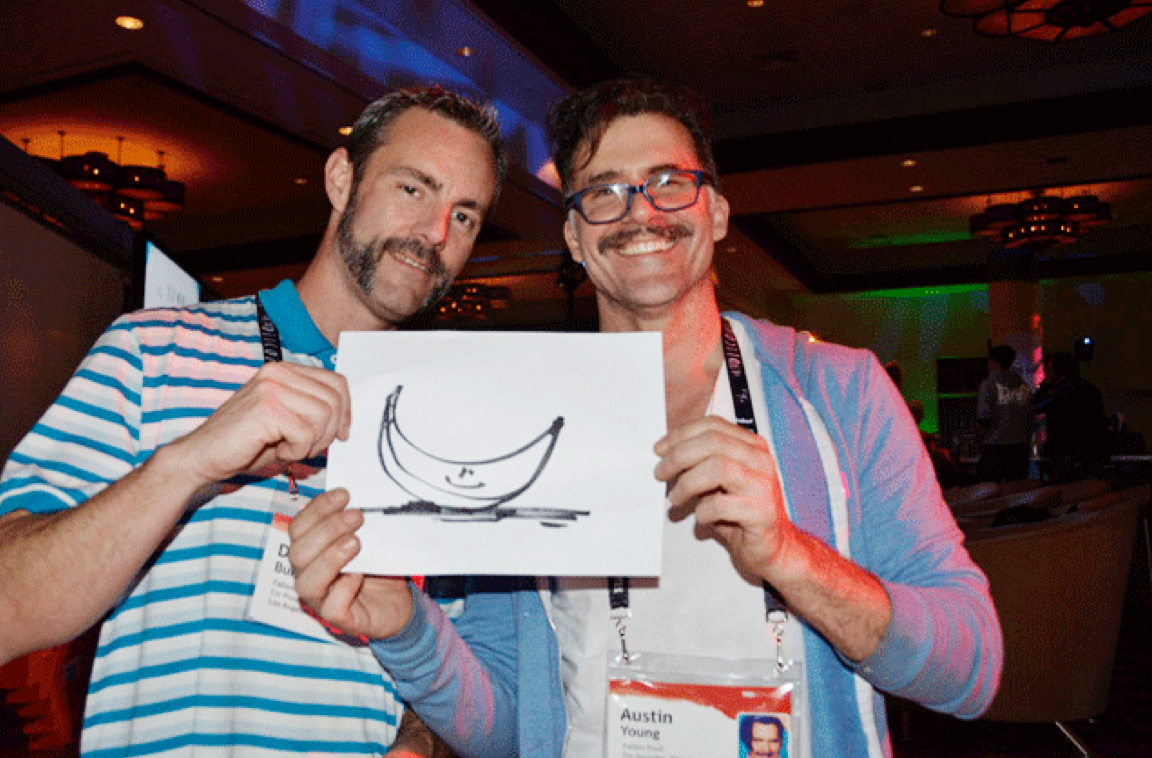
David Burns and Austin Young at TED Active 2013
