= Bettina Hubby =

Multi-media conceptual artist

Bettina Hubby is a multi-media conceptual artist currently residing in Los Angeles.

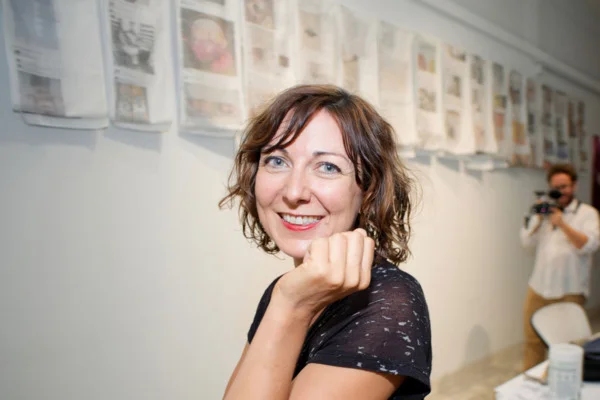
Bettina Hubby

== Biography ==
Hubby's practice encompasses curatorial, public engagement and project-based work, alongside more traditional media such as collage, drawing, photography and sculpture. After earning her MFA in 1995 from the School of Visual Arts in New York City, Hubby moved to Los Angeles in 1999.

She embarked upon large project titled "Thanks for the Mammaries" at ForYourArt in 2014. "Thanks for the Mammaries" was an exhibition in which Hubby turned her diagnosis with breast cancer into a community-supported celebration by organizing a show of 125 artists with related works. All sales from the show went to support women with breast cancer.

Before this, Hubby acted as the Santa Monica Museum of Art’s Resident Construction Artist, creating Dig the Dig, an installation related to the construction of the Olympic/26th Street Expo Metro Station. Other projects include The Eagle Rock Rock and Eagle Shop (2012), an installation and pop-up store in the Los Angeles community of Eagle Rock, Los Angeles. Her work was highlighted in The Home Show at the California Arts Foundation in 2011.

== Notable exhibitions ==
- "The Sexual Bronze Show", Klowden Mann Gallery, Los Angeles, January 16 to February 27, 2016
- "Come Up and See Me Sometime", Paris Photo LA, Paramount Studios, 2015
- "Chinatown League of Ultimate Benevolence", Fifth Floor Gallery, Los Angeles, May 30 to July 11, 2015
- "Love Potion No. 9", The Institute for Art and Olfaction, February 2015
- "Thanks for the Mammaries", ForYourArt, July 31 to August 17, 2014
- "Pretty Limber", Klowden Mann, September 7 to October 19, 2013
- "Googly Eyes for Giant Rock", High Desert Test Sites, October 12 to October 19, 2013
- "Dig the Dig" at the Santa Monica Museum of Art, 2013
- "The Eagle Rock Rock and Eagle Shop", April to June, 2012
- "Get Hubbied", 2012
