= John Burtle =

American artist

- Born: 1984 (age 40–41); Long Beach, California, U.S.
- Known for: performance, public art, Mail art

John Burtle (born in 1984) is an American artist who works in performance, Public Art, sculpture, and broadcast media. The artist lives in Los Angeles, often changes the spelling of their name, and frequently works with in groups .

== Work ==
Burtle's work questions how people support themselves and others. He has regularly collaborated with others and also makes art individually. The subject matter of his sculptures and paintings ranges from gifts of affection such as flowers and candies to symbols of social groups: a school of fish, birds nest. Sculptures and paintings are displayed physically on top of each other. He also regularly sends drawings on postcards to friends

In 2020 Burtle was included in the exhibition SEX at Kurimanzuto, curated by Salón Silicón. For the exhibition the artist displayed Mariposones y Amigues or/and Book Blanket #3 (for Salón Silicón) and/or Is that a butt plug in your pocket or are you just happy to see me? The work consists of a large blanket draped over an empty bed. The blanket was made by collaging together different fabrics that the artist had made, found, cut up from sheets and clothes, as well as other imagery from artists he works with regularly, and historic queer figures. The work sews together images of a disparate queer community across generations.

== Collaborative and collective projects ==
John Burtle and John Barllog began working together in 2006. In 2012 Sue Bell Yank wrote that the two Johns "construct workshops, interventions, and public actions that catalyze awareness of one’s influence on their environment and community." Their projects included "Make Your Own Effigy Workshops" on public sidewalks, a neighborhood wide Stone Soup, and releasing thousands of ladybugs in corporate retail spaces.

In 2007 John and John opened an exhibition space located on their left forearms. The galleries are designated by a tattooed rectangle and have had several names including Open Arms, Traveling Open Arm Display, Your Arms, and others. Over 200 artists have exhibit at the space, and exhibitions have included drawings, video projections, sculptures, performances, and more. The artist generally accept proposals from anyone and strive to exhibit art anywhere at any time. From 2019 to 2021 the gallery took the name Arm Gallery and was curated by Visitor Welcome Center for a series of exhibitions by 30 artists titled "No More Land West".

Burtle is a founder of the Eternal Telethon, a sporadically occurring live streamed performance art show that raises money to start an artist retirement home. He has organized broadcast from Machine Project, Public Fiction, and Human Resources in Los Angeles, and Bikini Wax in Mexico City.

The artist has been involved with Kchung Radio since the stations first broadcast, in 2011. With the artist Guan Rong, he hosted an hour long program called "Nooooooooooooooooooooooo" every Monday from 2011 to 2016.

Burtel has been a supporter of the Los Angeles Contemporary Archive and has donated over 200 pieces of ephemera, documents, and artworks by acclaimed and lesser-known artist to their collection.

== Career ==
Burtle has exhibited and performed at Human Resources Los Angeles, Craft Contemporary, Armory Center for the Arts, Los Angeles Contemporary Exhibitions, Museum of Contemporary Art, Los Angeles, Hammer Museum, Michael Benevento Gallery, Visitor Welcome Center, and the Getty Museum in Los Angeles. Outside of his home town he has presented projects at Museo Sierra Hermosa, Zacatecas; Kurrimanzuto, Mexico City; Museum of Contemporary Art, Chicago; Katohna Museum of Art, New York; Center for Performance Research, New York; and kohinoor, Copenhagen.
