= Jennifer Moon =

American artist (born 1973)

Jennifer Chihae Moon
- Born: Lafayette, Indiana, U.S.
- Education: UCLA, Art Center College of Design
- Known for: Conceptual art
- Website: jmoon.net/home.html

Jennifer Chihae Moon (born 1973) is a conceptual artist and life-artist living in Los Angeles. She was born in Lafayette, Indiana and completed her bachelor's degree at UCLA and master's degree at Art Center College of Design.

== After college ==
Moon had her first solo art exhibition in 1996 and her work was shown regularly up to 2002. After receiving a graduate degree from Art Center, Moon suffered from drug abuse and was sentenced to 18 months in the Valley State Prison for Women in 2008, following several attempted robberies. Although she made a wonderful comeback with artistic skills. Jennifer Moon has been a part of multiple exhibitions since attending college. After battling her addiction and going to state prison for armed robbery Moon made a story of herself through her art. She wrote a book in regard to her life in prison and how her success came to be but she also made herself become known for her talent. In 2018 Jennifer Moon received an award for her visual art at the commonwealth and council. Later also is when she wrote her book. Aside from her book she has had multiple articles written about her. Jennifer Moon has been active on her social media and has been holding many events that showcase her works.

== Publishing books ==
Moon published two books in 2012 as part of an exhibition at Commonwealth and Council, a Los Angeles art exhibition space: Principle 1 of The Revolution Definition of Abundance (2012) and Where I Learned of Love (2012). As part of her contribution to the 2014 iteration of the Hammer Museum's Made in LA Biennial exhibition, Moon published The Book of Eros (2014).

Since 2012 Moon has had a monthly radio show on KCHUNG Radio formerly titled Adventures Within now titled Adventures With You where she covers topics such as love, body issues, race, trauma, and politics.

From 2014 to 2015 Moon installed six video cameras in her home and car that broadcast twenty four hours a day to the public space of the Equitable Life Building lobby.

Moon was the recipient of a 2013 CCF Fellowship and the Moan public recognition award at the 2014 Made in LA exhibition at the Hammer Museum.

In 2019, Moon's work "The Mooniform" was exhibited in the group show "School for Endurance Work," curated by Carole Frances Lung, at Cal State LA's Fine Arts Gallery.

== Exhibitions ==
Moon has exhibited venues such as:

- China Art Objects, Los Angeles, California
- Hammer Museum, Los Angeles, California
- Cirrus Gallery, Los Angeles, California
- Gertrude Contemporary Art Spaces, Melbourne, Australia
- Commonwealth and Council, Los Angeles, California
- Transmission Gallery, Glasgow Scotland
- Over the Wall, Mission District, San Francisco
- Psychopomp, Westchester, Los Angeles
- Presence in Absence, Irvine, California
- Mr. Snuggles: Forever, Pasadena, California
- Nonconforming, Chicago, Illinois
