= Equitable Life Building (Los Angeles) =

Skyscraper in Los Angeles

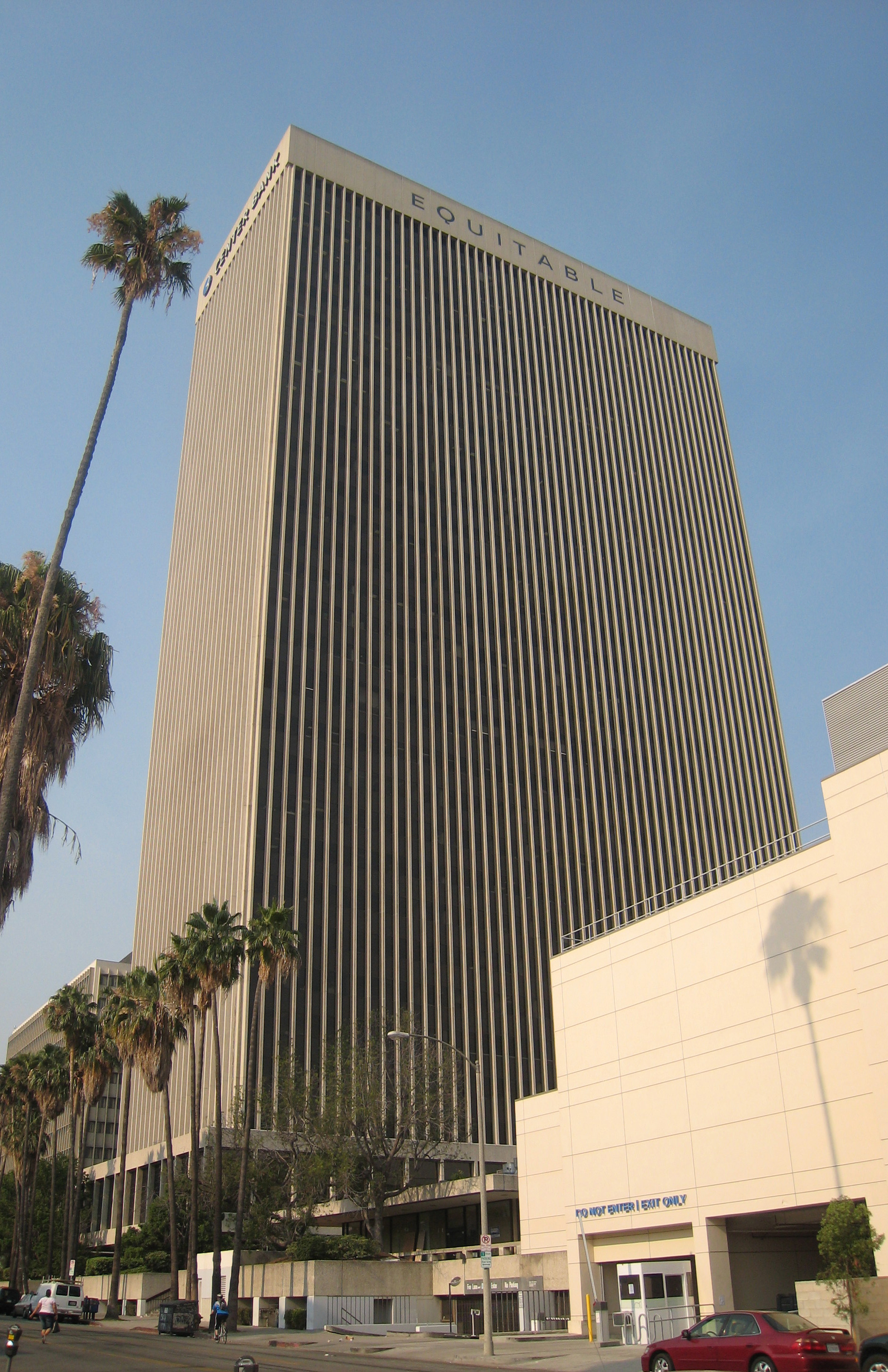
- Equitable Life Building, viewed from 6th street
- Interactive map of the Equitable Life Building area
- Alternative names: Center Bank Building

General information
- Status: Completed
- Type: Commercial offices
- Architectural style: International style Modernism
- Location: 3435 Wilshire Boulevard, Los Angeles, California
- Coordinates: 34.0621°N 118.2984°W
- Completed: 1969

Height
- Roof: 138 m (453 ft)

Technical details
- Floor count: 34; 5 below ground
- Lifts/elevators: 34

Design and construction
- Architect: Welton Becket & Associates
- Structural engineer: Welton Becket & Associates
- Main contractor: Turner Construction

The Equitable Life Building is a 138 m (453 ft) International style skyscraper in the Koreatown neighborhood of Los Angeles, California. It was completed in 1969 and has 34 floors. It is tied with the Los Angeles City Hall for the 43rd-tallest building in Los Angeles. Welton Becket & Associates designed the building for the Equitable Life Insurance Company. The facade is made of precast concrete that was sandblasted to expose the beige Texas limestone aggregate.

The lobby of the Equitable Life Building hosts art in its vitrines. This space is called Equitable Vitrines. These vitrines have hosted art including Jennifer Moon's Will You Still Love Me: Learning to Love Yourself, It Is The Greatest Gift of All in 2014-2015. In an interview with Ocula Magazine, Equitable Vitrines founders Ellie Lee and Matt Connolly explained that they realised through negotiations with the building's management, 'bureaucrats, artists, and tenants—each required a different way of thinking and speaking about what art is and what it can or should do.'

Since March 2, 2015, the Equitable Life Building has served as the chancery of the Philippine Consulate General in Los Angeles, occupying part of its fifth floor.

== In popular culture ==
The tower has been featured in Grand Theft Auto V called the "Little Seoul Tower", although the in-game model differs from the Equitable Life Building.

== See also ==
- List of tallest buildings in Los Angeles
