= The Firecracker Press =

- Industry: Graphic design Letterpress
- Founded: 2002
- Founder: Eric Woods
- Headquarters: St. Louis

The Firecracker Press is a letterpress and graphic design studio located in St. Louis, Missouri. It was founded in 2002 by owner Eric Woods. The Firecracker Press uses letterpress printing techniques to create posters, cards, invitations and other paper goods.

The shop is currently located at 2838 Cherokee Street and has become an active participant in the neighborhood's recent renaissance through activities such as the Cherokee Print League Holiday Sale. They moved to this location in May 2008 from a previous shop on Chippewa. The shop houses a retail space in front, with workspace and the print shop in the back of the building. There are currently ten printing presses in the shop, whose manufacturing dates range from the 1890s to 1990s. The Riverfront Times designated the shop part of the Best New Local Art Trend in their 2009 Best Of St. Louis Issue.

The Firecracker Press puts out a poetry magazine twice a year called The Lumberyard in conjunction with Typecast Publishing. The Lumberyard has received the 2009 Platinum Award for Graphic Design in the Louisville Graphic Design Association 100 show and several Awards of Merit from the AIGA of St. Louis. Dwight Garner of the New York Times called it "the most physically beautiful new journal I’ve seen" and "a magazine to watch".

== Awards ==
2010 Award of Merit AIGA of St. Louis, Lumberyard Issues 4 & 5
2010 Award of Merit AIGA of St. Louis, Billiken Club poster series
2010 Award of Merit AIGA of St. Louis, Schlafly retail products
2010 Award of Merit AIGA of St. Louis, Adam Woodruff and Associates identity package
2010 Schlafly Art Fair, Work Most Evocative of St. Louis
2010 Where Magazine’s, “30 Things We Love About St. Louis"
2009 Platinum Award for Graphic Design in the Louisville Graphic Design Association 100 show
Best New Local Art Trend The Riverfront Times 2009 Best Of St. Louis Issue

== See also ==
- Richard Newman (poet)
