= Citizenship Aesthetics =

Citizenship Aesthetics (Chinese: 公民美學; pinyin: Gōngmín Měixué) is a movement set forth in 2004 by Council for Cultural Affairs of the Republic of China that proposes an aesthetic style of practicing citizenship. Another translation of the term is civil aesthetics.

The anthropologist Chen Chi-nan became the minister of the Council for Cultural Affairs in 2004 to promote citizenship aesthetics. He said that the citizen aesthetics movement ought to be premise on "overall community construction" in which citizens experience creativity and beauty through bettering nearby business districts and streets. In a 2004 editorial, Min Sheng Bao said that while citizen aesthetics had a very clear goal, no one could put forth how to achieve it which explained why it was not prioritized by earlier leaders of the ministry. The editorial concluded, "We sincerely hope that Civic Aesthetics will become a policy program whose effectiveness can be reviewed within a few years."
