= Stephen van Dyck =

American writer and artist

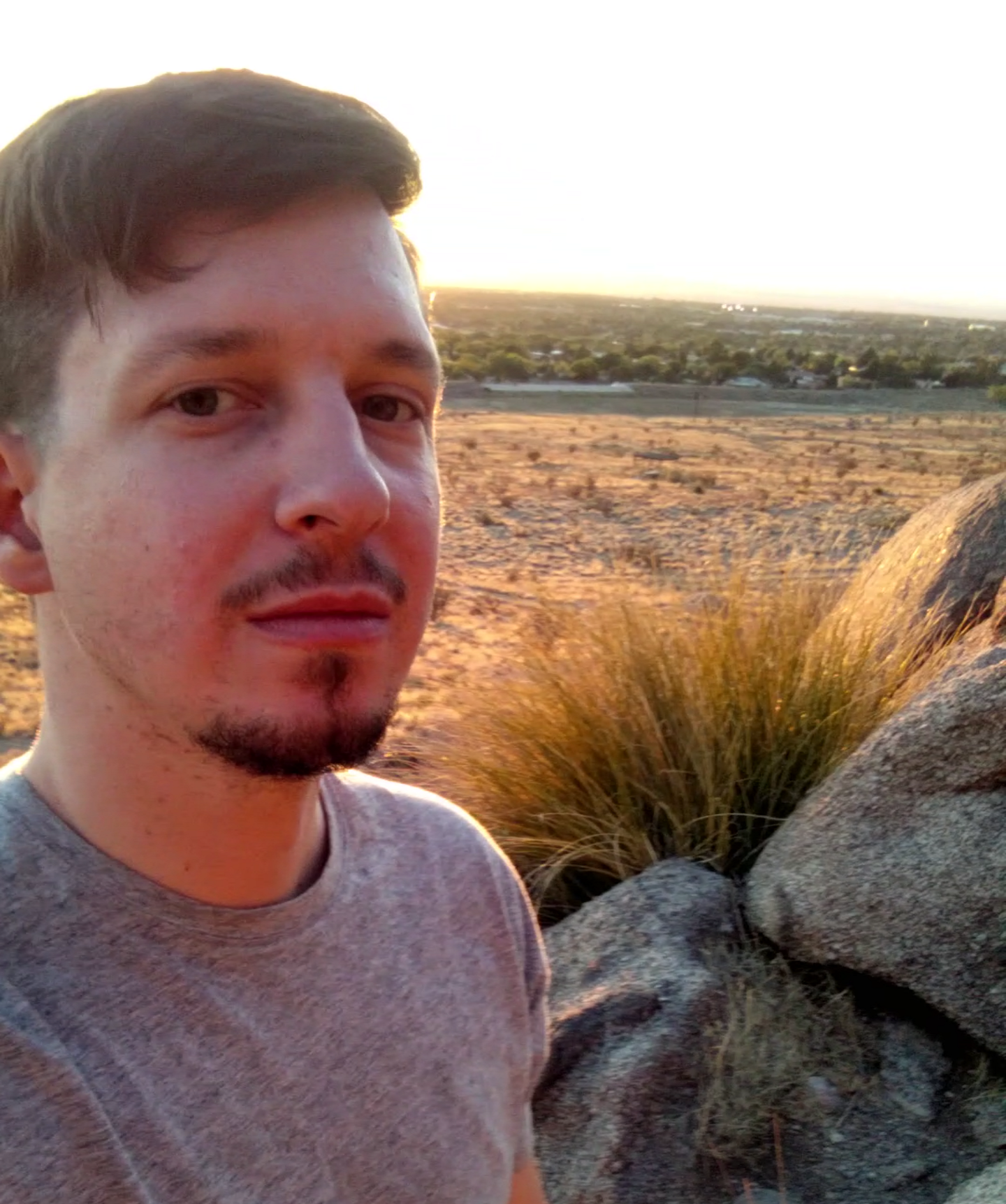
- Stephen van Dyck in New Mexico
- Writing career
- Genres: Literary nonfiction, New Narrative, queer, performance, public art
- Website: stephenvandyck.com

Stephen van Dyck is a Los Angeles, California and Albuquerque, New Mexico based writer and artist. He is the author of People I've Met From the Internet, and organizer of the Los Angeles Road Concerts.

== Books ==
People I've Met From the Internet is an experimental memoir in the form of a very long annotated list of the people van Dyck met online from 1997 to 2009. Through the annotations, van Dyck tells a queer reimagining of the coming-of-age story that contends with loss and a never-quite-arriving adulthood. In a review for Zyzzyva, Julia Matthews called the book "the ultimate memoir for the Information Age: a series of extraordinarily personal vignettes derived from a data spreadsheet."[1] Novelist John Rechy wrote of People I've Met From the Internet: "This is an impressive work, modern, relevant, powerfully startling in its effect."[6] Writer Chris Kraus called it "a brilliantly written, taxonomic account of growing up queer at the turn of the millennium."[7] Filmmaker Miranda July tweeted that the book was "unputdownable."[8]

== Curatorial projects ==
In 2008, van Dyck founded Los Angeles Road Concerts, a semi-annual series of all-day arts events in which artists of all kinds perform and install works in unused public spaces.[1][2][3]

In 2018, van Dyck collaborated with the Los Angeles County Metropolitan Transportation Authority on Changes, a showcase featuring 20 artists and performers in and around LA’s Union Station.[4]

== Other works ==
From 2012 to 2016, van Dyck hosted a radio show called Customer Care on KCHUNG Radio in Los Angeles. On the show, van Dyck contacted debt collectors, customer service agents, and telemarketers. Through an episodic narrative about his debts and defaulted CalArts loans, he and his callers shared conversations about their personal lives.[1]

== Bibliography ==
- People I've Met From the Internet. Los Angeles, CA. Ricochet Editions. 2019 OCLC 1099202013
