= Pau S. Pescador =

American photographer (born 1983)

Pau S. Pescador (born in 1983) is an American contemporary artist who works in film, photography, and performance.

== Early life and education ==
Pescador was born in Indio, California. Pescador received a Bachelor of Arts degree in 2005 from the University of Southern California and a Master of Fine Arts degree in 2012 from the University of California, Irvine.

== Career ==
Pescador is known for their playful photographic use of color and composition, and for their short film narratives that follow both personal experience and fiction.

Pescador has shown widely in Los Angeles and other areas of California, including exhibitions at the University of California, Los Angeles, the REDCAT theater at the California Institute of the Arts, and the University of California, Berkeley. Their films have screened at the Machine Project, Human Resources, the Echo Park Film Center in Los Angeles, and the Durham Studio Theater at the University of California, Berkeley.

Pescador also works in curation and has organized shows at the Hammer Museum and The Pit in Los Angeles.

In 2015, Pescador was the grant recipient of the California Community Foundation's Emerging Category.

== Personal life ==
Pescador lives and works in Los Angeles.

== See also ==
- List of American artists
- List of people from Los Angeles
- List of photographers
