= Miles Regis =

Trinidadian multimedia artist

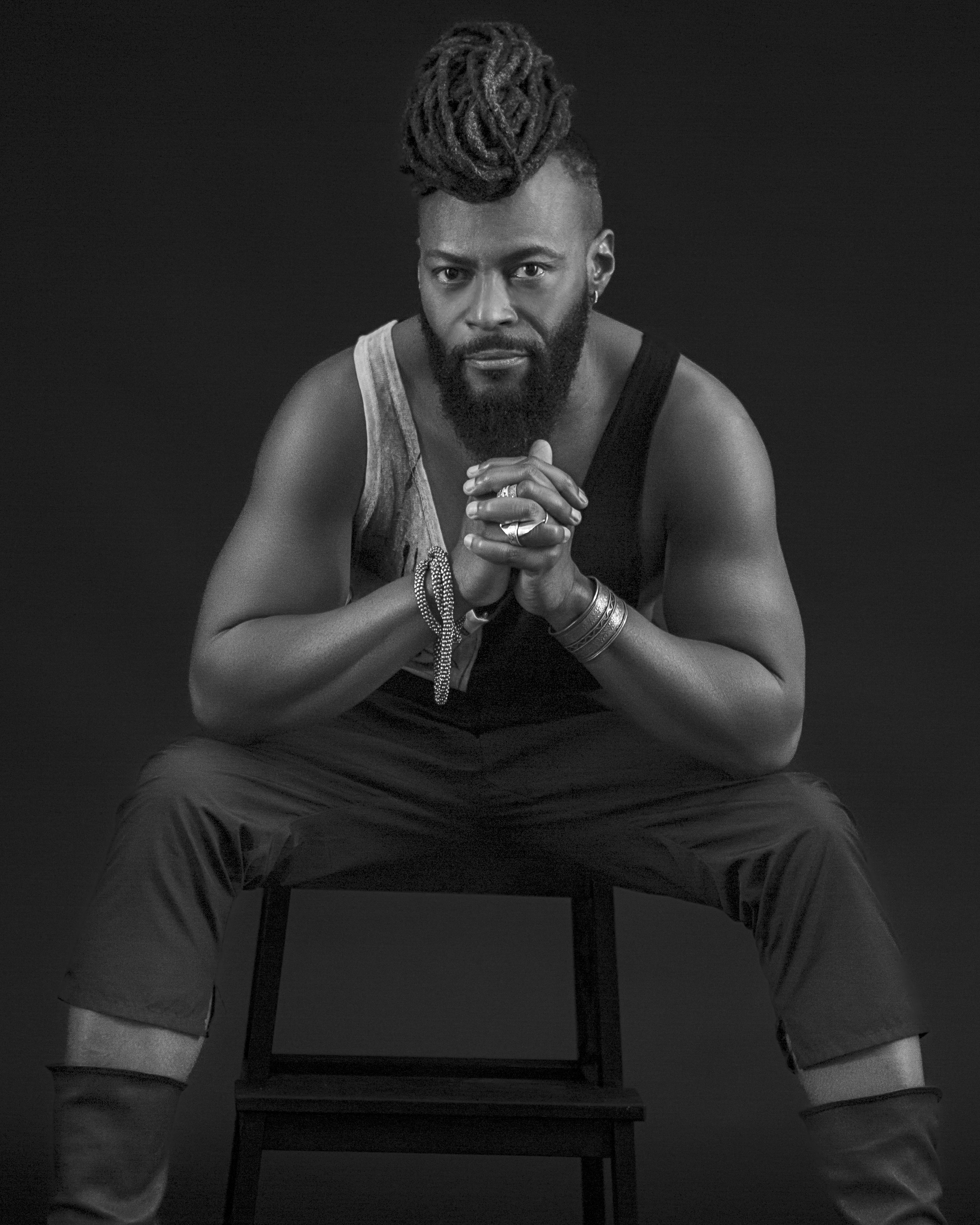
- Regis in 2022
- Born: November 28, 1967 (age 58); Los Angeles, California
- Education: University of Southern California
- Known for: Painting; Art and music mixed media installations

Miles Regis (born November 28, 1967), is a Los Angeles-based Trinidadian multimedia artist. His media includes oil, acrylic, charcoal, latex paint and occasional newspaper. He is a USC graduate and uses drip painting and collage work.

== Early life and education ==
Miles Anthony Regis was born on 1967, in San Fernando, Trinidad, to Cynthia King, a singer and actress and later a teacher, and Fitzroy Regis. Miles and his sibling Marlon, born in 1971, were surrounded by the arts as children. There was constant exposure to art and many genres of music including their native steel drums and calypso, jazz, soul, funk, reggae, and hip-hop. His early artistic influences included many family members and included artists such as his uncle, artist Alexander Sylvester King, his aunt, actress/television personality Stephanie King, herself married to David Boothman, artist, musician, and nephew to the Holder brothers, Boscoe and Geoffrey. Miles would later contribute to David and brother Michael Boothman's jazz ensemble Kysofusion as lead singer for a brief tour which took them to the United States in 1988. Also shaping Miles's creativity was producer and musician Pelham Goddard who accompanied Miles on several of his early performances as well as his uncle, Jamaican writer and playwright Trevor Rhone.

Regis painted as well as was a singer for most of his childhood and teenage years. After high school, he wrote and sang on several radio and television jingles, and recorded and toured as the lead singer for the popular 15-member band Fireflight. He and his then-girlfriend Luanna, later his wife, left Trinidad in 1989 for the U.S., with Luanne moving to New York and Miles to Los Angeles. Luanne joined Regis in Los Angeles a year later, after he was accepted to the University of Southern California where he majored in creative writing. They married in 2000 and are the parents of a son and a daughter. In 1997 he got his first professional artist break, when one of his paintings was featured in Erykah Badu's Next Lifetime music video.

== Work ==
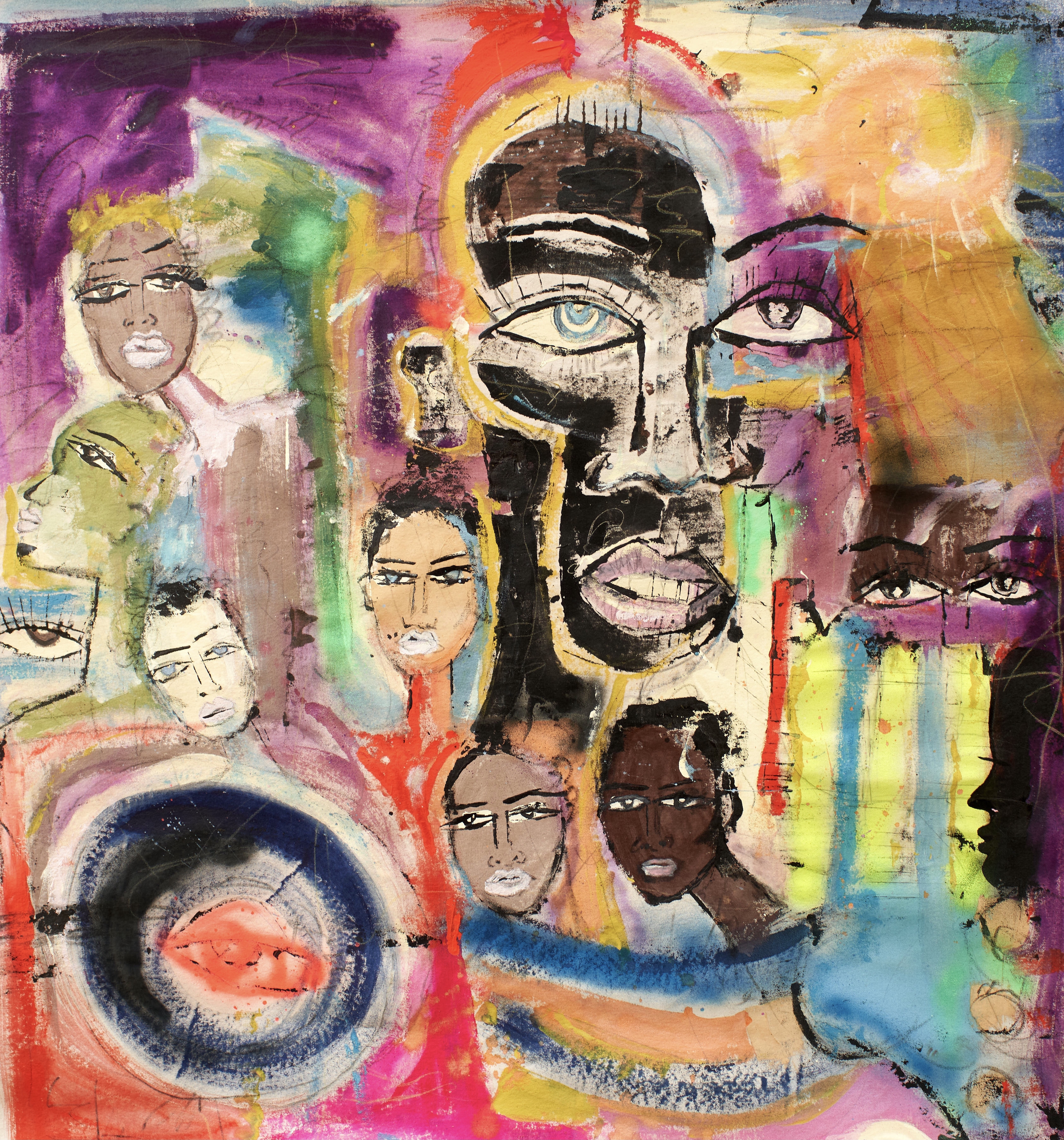
What A Time To Be Alive at Von Lintel Gallery.

Regis is known for his work with drip painting and collage. His work consists mainly of oversized canvases, often stretching up to twenty-two feet in length and/or height. In addition to the larger pieces, the artist also finds himself drawn to stylized expressions on various sized canvas, linens, diptychs, triptychs and objects like cell phone cases, clothing and fashion accessories, recycled denim, newspapers, wood assemblage and most recently digital 3D, VR and AR. Miles' work has been described as "a force of a Caribbean nature, completely unstoppable and his creativity absolutely relentless".

Regis studied painting, singing and writing, worked as a singer in Trinidad, then pursued creative writing at USC. All of these influences are apparent in his work. Primitive figurative forms, often leaning toward abstraction, reflect his classic training. Dancing figures are in several pieces, while written statements on paintings draw on his creative writing background.
