= Sean Raspet =

American artist based in San Francisco (born 1981)

Sean Raspet (born 1981) is an American artist based in San Francisco. Raspet is known for his artworks that consist of liquid chemical formulations, often involving flavor and fragrance molecules. Recently, his work has involving food and human metabolism. Raspet is also the co-founder of the algae-based food company Nonfood.

== Life ==
Raspet was born in Washington, D.C. in 1981, and raised in Jacksonville, Florida.

== Art career ==
Raspet's earlier work features contracts and other legal frameworks such as non-disclosure agreements, real estate subleases, and patents. His work titled * (2008) required potential viewers to sign a non-disclosure agreement that barred them from ever discussing the work in the future. His work, "A Composition of Matter Consisting of the Difference between Two Compositions of Matter" (2012 – 2014) was a patent application for a substance composed of the difference between Coca-Cola and Pepsi. It included an analysis of the two products’ molecular composition and flavor chemistry. His work is informed by philosophy and metaphysics.

In 2014 Raspet produced the exhibition New Flavors and Fragrances, which consisted of liquid chemical formulations of artificial flavor and fragrance molecules, arranged and composed based on their molecular structures. Later in 2014, Raspet produced the exhibition Residuals, which included a liquid reconstruction of crude oil made from its component molecules. For this exhibition, Raspet also produced a work that reconstructed the background scent of the gallery's air by analyzing its chemical signature. This was used to create a “scratch and sniff” wall paint that covered the surfaces of the gallery and released the gallery's background smell when scratched.

In 2015 Raspet exhibited (-), (2012 – 2015) a molecular mirror image of Coca-Cola that the artist had produced by analyzing the chemical makeup of the product and then recomposed using the reverse chirality or enantiomeric molecules for each component of the original substance.

In 2016, Raspet exhibited a large installation at the Frieze New York Art Fair that presented viewers with large refrigerators filled with Soylent. Raspet was formerly an employee of Soylent, where he worked as a flavorist.

In 2017, he founded a company called non/food, in order to develop food products based on micro-algaes. As part of his transcisicplinary practice, Raspet exhibited some of the company's products in an exhibition at the SculptureCenter in 2018.

In 2018 Raspet was one of seven artists invited to headline the Rhizome Seven on Seven digital conference. The same year, Raspet exhibited an installation of ten scent-diffusing machines at Bridget Donahue gallery in New York City. Also in 2018, Raspet exhibited three new fragrance molecules at The Artist's Institute in New York. The molecules were designed by Raspet and synthesized in collaboration with chemists at Hunter College. Each molecule had a distinct, new scent that had not existed previously.

== Selected exhibitions ==
2007

- A Modest Proposal, Daniel Reich Gallery at the Frieze Art Fair, London
- Ilya Lipkin, Sean Raspet, Ned Vena, Cohan and Leslie, New York
- Untitled (Perfect Lovers), BC Project Room, New York
- Way Things Are, Daniel Reich Gallery, New York
- Inaugural Exhibition, Museum 52, New York
- "The Ones We Work For", Daniel Reich Gallery, New York

2008

- The Shape of Things to Come, Saatchi Gallery, London
- "A Brief History", Art Positions, Daniel Reich Gallery at Basel Miami Art Fair

2015

- Office Space, Yerba Buena Center for the Arts

2017

- 99 Cents or Less, Museum of Contemporary Art Detroit

2018

- I was raised on the Internet, Museum of Contemporary Art Chicago
- Receptor-Binding Variations, Bridget Donahue, New York
