= C. W. J. Johnson =

American photographer (1833-1903)

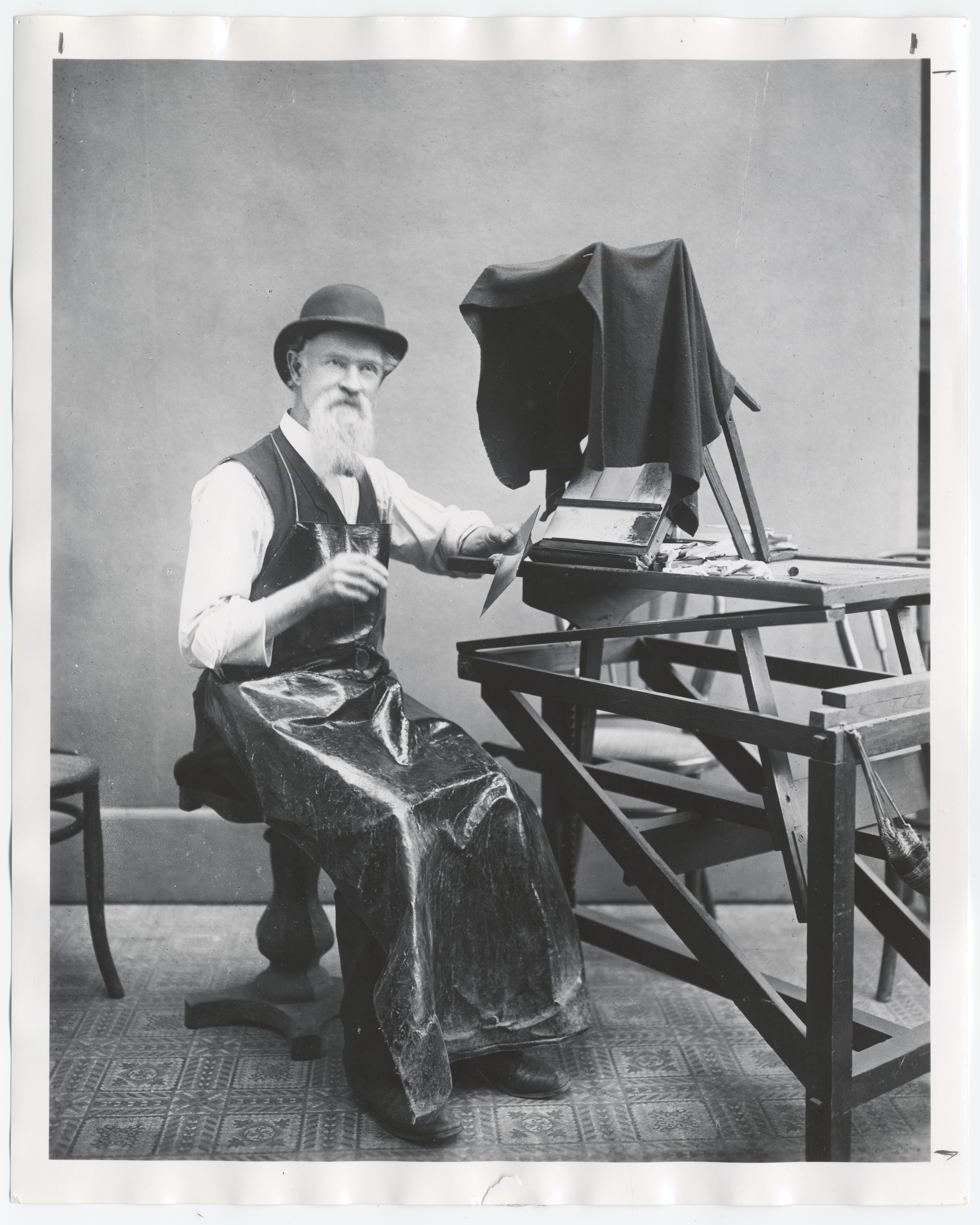
- Johnson at his negative retouching stand
- Born: Charles Wallace Jacob Johnson; August 3, 1833; Maryland, US
- Died: January 17, 1903 (aged 69); Salinas, California, US
- Occupations: Photographer, musician
- Years active: 1860–1900
- Known for: First official photographer of Hotel Del Monte
- Spouse: Norah Pardon

C. W. J. Johnson (August 3, 1833 – January 17, 1903) was an American miner, photographer, musician, and dance instructor. His photographic work is held in the permanent collections of the Monterey Museum of Art, Pacific Grove Museum of Natural History, and the J. Paul Getty Museum.

== Early life ==
C. W. J. Johnson, born on August 3, 1833, in Maryland. His parents were George M. and Matilda Johnson.

== Career ==
Johnson moved to California in 1857, along the North Fork Feather River. He later worked in the silver mining area of Grass Valley by 1863. That same year he journeyed to Nevada, where he worked as a one-man band and taught dance, before returning to San Francisco in 1868. On July 6, 1868, he traveled to Humboldt Bay by the steamer Del Norte. On July 11, he helped out the Tanner Troupe, a local theatre troupe.

=== Photographic career: 1868-1903 ===
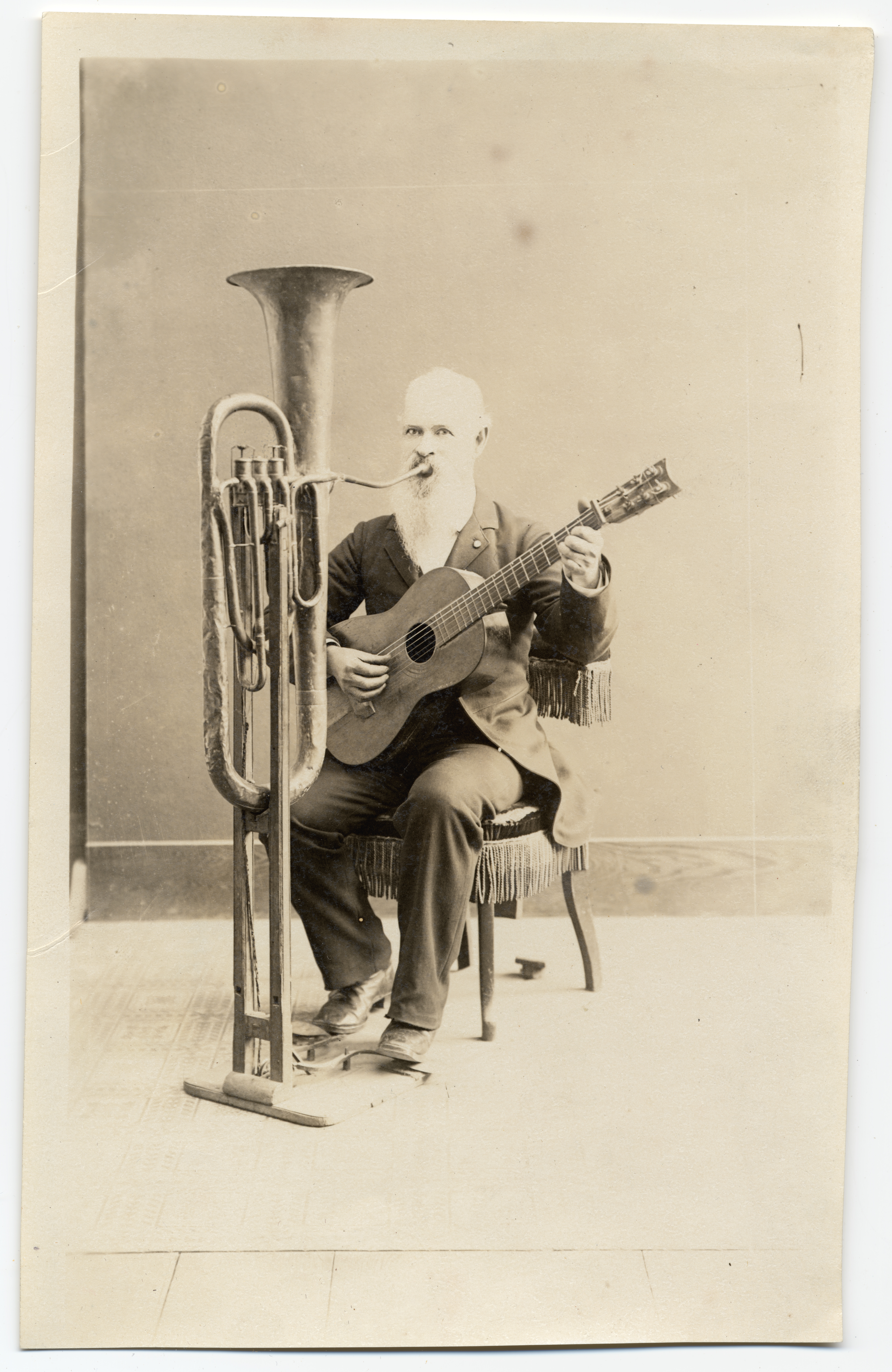
C.W.J. Johnson as a "one man band" playing the guitar and tuba

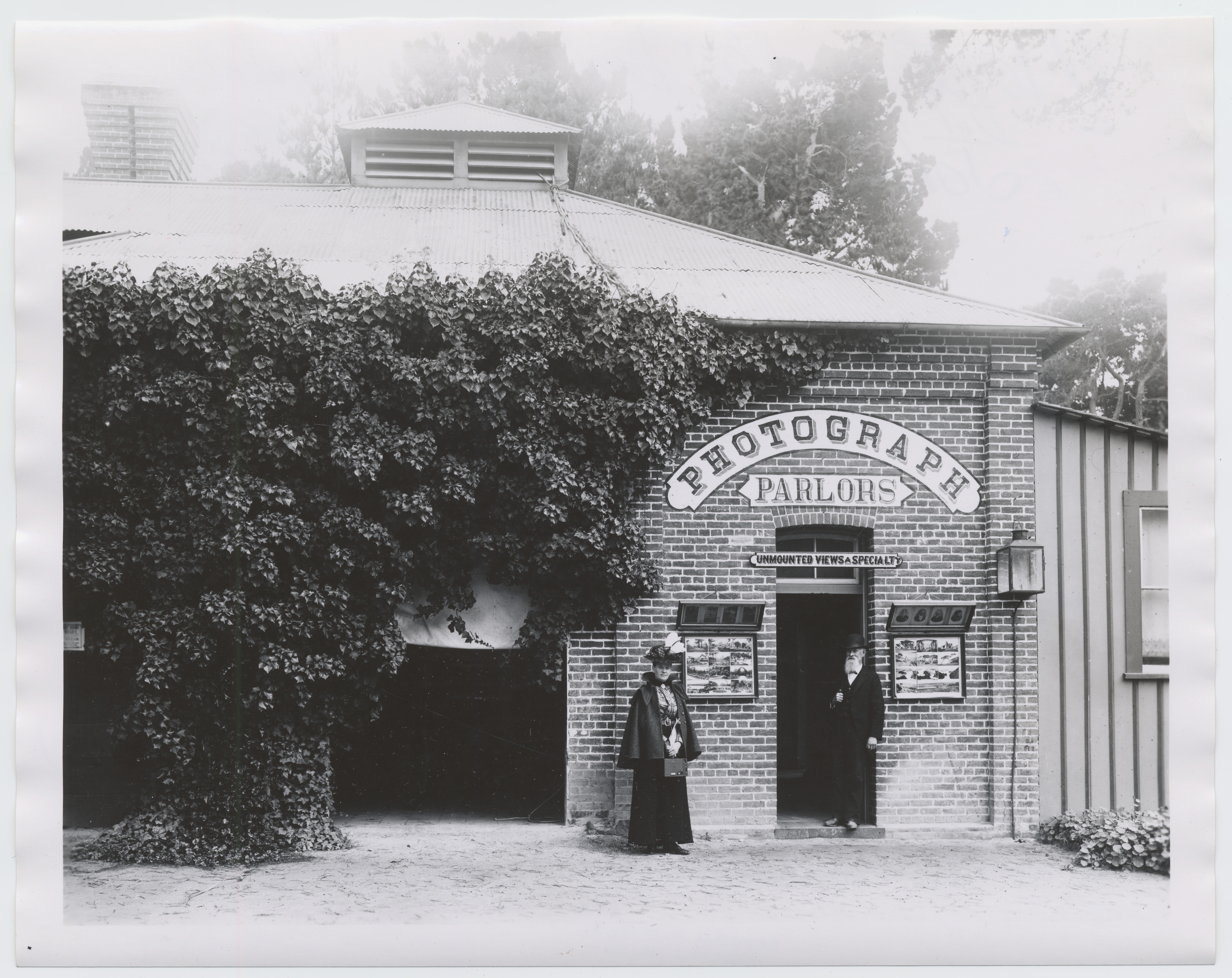
C. W. J. Johnson Photo Parlors at the Hotel Del Monte with view of brick building with corrugated tin roof housing

On July 13, 1968, Johnson traveled to Arcata by stagecoach and stayed at the American Hotel. In Arcata, he was the director of a cornet band, as well as a music teacher and dance instructor. In 1870, Johnson took photographs of the Eureka Brass Band with eleven brass players and two drummers.

Tuttle and Johnson closed their Eureka Gallery around November 5, 1870, and relocated their enterprise to San Francisco's Cosmopolitan Gallery, where they operated until early 1872. Johnson then moved to Watsonville, where he partnered with Timothy A. Sullivan. Johnson married Sullivan's sister, Norah Pardon, on December 2, 1875. In 1873, Johnson & Sullivan opened their photographic studio on Pacific Avenue in Santa Cruz.

In 1880, Johnson moved to Monterey, where he ran his photography business from 1881 to 1898. Between the mid-1880s and the late 1890s, Johnson served as the Hotel Del Monte's first official photographer, capturing the hotel and its formal gardens. In 1887, he established the Photograph Parlors within the grounds of hotel with photographs displayed within frames on the front of the building.

With his dry-plate camera, he documented the Monterey Peninsula, California Missions, historic adobes, Farallon Lighthouse, Point Bonita Lighthouse, Point Lobos, the Chinese Fishing Village, and other popular sites. The California Historical Society wrote that he was known as the premier photographer of the Monterey Peninsula during the late 19th-century.

== Death and legacy ==
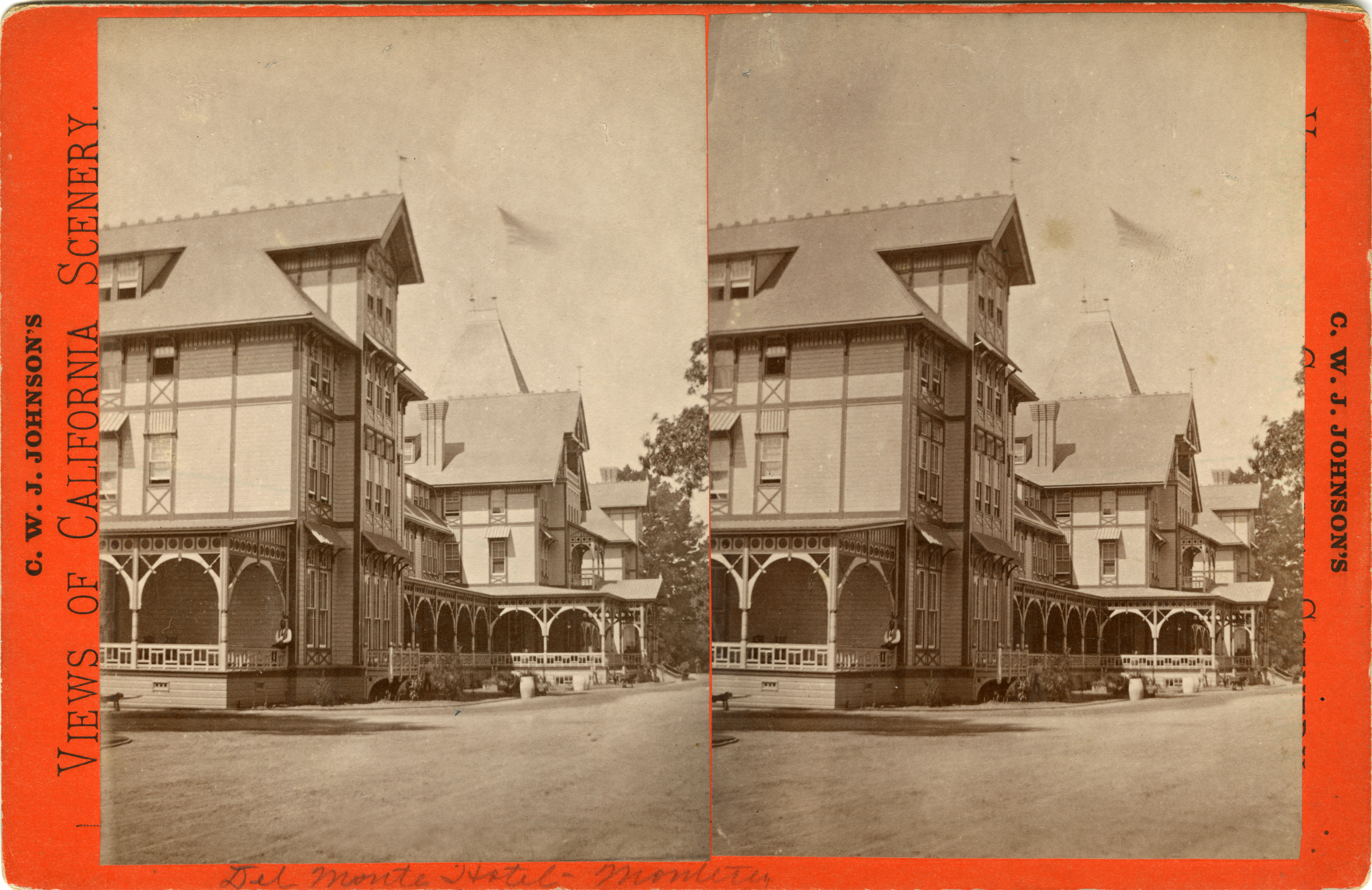
View of Hotel Del Monte, an early C. W. J. Johnson's Views Of California Scenery stereoscopic card

Johnson died in Salinas, California on January 17, 1903.

In 1920, the California State Library in Sacramento, California received the photographic archive of Johnson through a gift from Francis Hilby, a Monterey druggist and railway agent. The C. W. J. Johnson collection consists of diaries, correspondence, glass negatives, stereoscopic cards, cabinet cards, and other scenic views. His views of the Hotel Del Monte and formal gardens form the major portion of the collection. The Bancroft Library has a collection of Johnson's Views Of California Scenery on stereoscopic cards.

There is also a Johnson collection at the Monterey County Historical Society in Salinas, California. It has over 700 images from 5 inches (130 mm) x 8 inches (200 mm), 6.5 inches (170 mm) x 8.5 inches (220 mm), and 8 inches (200 mm) x 10 inches (250 mm) glass negatives, original prints, and stereograph views.

== See also ==
- List of American photographers
- Monochrome photography
