= Anthony Lepore =

American artist

Anthony Lepore (born 1977) is an American artist working in photography and sculpture.

== Work ==
Lepore's work has investigated the frictions created by the containment and cultural representation of nature. His early work explored people's relationships with animals, focusing his lens on people with their pets, and on animal surgeries and rehabilitation. An extended project called "Bird Shop" consisted of the portraits of passersby gazing into a bird shop window from a busy street in New York City.

Beginning in 2007, Lepore photographed in the visitor centers of National Parks, creating images of displays that challenge the expectations of landscape photography. Describing his images made in these visitor centers, Sarah Lehrer-Graiwer wrote in Artforum that "Lepore homes in on places of rupture that break and undermine photographic illusion."

In more recent works, Lepore has further investigated the relationship of photography to illusionistic representation and invention. For a 2010 exhibition at the Los Angeles Central Library, Lepore created a scaled-down recreation of one of the library's glass cases. Embedded in the larger case, the sculpture's surface was mounted with photographs of the glass case, which had been filled with library books on the topic of the human body and propagation. "Lepore's installation casts the viewer deep into a surreal and uncanny scene by contrasting sculptural anthropomorphism with the odd precision of photographic representation."

Regarding Lepore's still lives, Joanna Szupinska-Myers wrote that "by echoing the effects of digital editing—constructing what he refers to as an “analog illusion”—Lepore's photograph speaks in a language that it simultaneously subverts."

== Exhibitions ==
- Performance Anxiety, Moskowitz Bayse, Los Angeles, 2019
- Seeing Each Other, with Michael Henry Hayden, Left Field Gallery, Los Osos, 2018
- The Green Curtain, with Michael Henry Hayden, Del Vaz Projects, Los Angeles, 2017
- Splash, Glow, Fullflex at the Bikini Factory, Public Fiction, Los Angeles, 2015
- Bikini Factory, Ghebaly Gallery, Los Angeles, 2015
- Sleepyhead, The Finley, Los Angeles, 2015
- Flash, California Museum of Photography, Riverside, 2014
- New Wilderness, Ghebaly Gallery, Los Angeles, 2011
- New Wilderness Part Two, M+B Gallery, Los Angeles, 2011
- Paper Surrogate, works sited, Los Angeles Central Library, 2010
- Restoration, Kemper Museum of Contemporary Art, Kansas City, 2008
- Bird Shop, Marvelli Gallery, New York, 2007
- I Would Make You My Own, Marvelli Gallery, New York, 2006

== Permanent collections ==
- J. Paul Getty Museum, Los Angeles
- Los Angeles County Museum of Art, Los Angeles
- Hammer Museum, Los Angeles
- Solomon R. Guggenheim Museum, New York
- Kemper Museum of Contemporary Art, Kansas City
- Yale University Art Gallery, New Haven
- Museum of Contemporary Photography, Chicago
- The Mint Museum of Art, Charlotte
- The Fitchburg Museum of Art, Massachusetts
