= Sissel Tolaas =

Norwegian artist and researcher (born 1961)

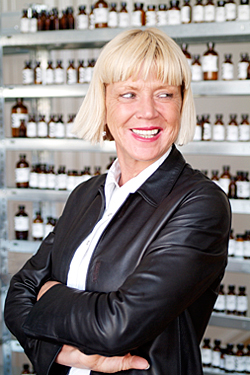
- Sissel Tolaas in her Berlin laboratory
- Born: Sissel Tolaas; 21 june 1961; Stavanger
- Known for: Research on odor

Sissel Tolaas is a Norwegian artist and researcher known for her work with smell.

== Early life ==
Sissel Tolaas was born in 1961 in Stavanger, Norway and is now based in Berlin. Tolaas has a background in chemistry, mathematics, linguistics, languages and art; she studied at the universities of Oslo, Warsaw, Moscow, St. Petersburg and Oxford.

== Research on smell ==
Tolaas researches diverse aspects relating to scents. She first started researching its importance in 1990 through art and design among other fields. At that time, she developed a "smell archive" in over 7,000 airtight jars. In January 2004 Tolaas established the Smell Research Lab Berlin for smell and communication / language, supported by International Flavours and Fragrances (IFF). Her research has won recognition through numerous national and international scholarships, honours, and prizes including the 2014 CEW, New York award for chemistry & innovation; 2009 Rouse Foundation Award from Harvard University Graduate School of Design; an honorary mention at the 2010 ArsElectronica in Linz, Austria; and the 2010-2011-2012-2014 Synthetic Biology / Synthetic Aesthetics Award from Stanford and Edinburgh Universities including a residency at Harvard Medical School. Tolaas founded the Institute of Functional Smells in 2010, which focuses on health, education, and well-being. In 2016 Tolaas became a founding member of Future of Education, a collaboration with the Nanyang Technical University Singapore and The Future Education Platform, Berlin.

== Projects ==
Tolaas has completed 52 City SmellScape research projects since 1998, of, for and with major cities including Paris, Kansas City, Berlin, and Amman.

Since 2018 Tolaas is working on an archive of the world's oceans and a project on the morbidity and decay of Detroit. Since 2014 Tolaas has been active in several start-ups in the field of the senses. In 2016 Tolaas launched the world's first Smell Memory Kit; several other devices and sense tools are under development.

The Re_Search Lab continues to support interdisciplinary projects and research involving smell, odor, and fragrance. It establishes communication among experts in different fields dealing with olfaction.

Her project Sweat Fear | Fear Sweat from 2005 examines the body odors of twenty men, all of whom have a severe phobia of other bodies. Their smells were collected and chemically reproduced. The simulated sweat molecules were painted onto the gallery walls using a micro-encapsulation process, where they became activated by touch.

In her artist's statement about the installation the Fear of smell — the smell of Fear at the 2005 Tirana Biennale, Tolaas explains:

"In the modern West, we tend to think of smell in purely aesthetic terms, pleasant or unpleasant. In many other cultures however, smells have provided and still provide a basic means of defining the and interacting with the world. This is particularly the case in so far as odours are closely associated with personal and group identity. The study of the history, anthropology, and sociology of smells is, in a very real sense, an investigation into the ‘essence’ of human culture itself."

Tolaas works with numerous companies and institutions, and her projects have been presented, among others, in TED Global, Cooper-Hewitt Museum, Minsheng Art Museum in Shanghai, Time Museum Guangzhou, Edinburgh International Fashion Festival 2012, and Louisiana Museum in Denmark. She has had engagements with many universities and institutions around the world, including MIT and Harvard University.

Beginning in 2019, Tolaas has worked with fashion brand Balenciaga on custom scents and set designs for runway presentations. As part of Balenciaga's first couture presentation, the artist created a candle using scent molecules extracted from Balenciaga's headquarters and garments in their archive. The Metropolitan Museum Costume Institute worked with Tolaas to develop custom scents for the 2024 show "Sleeping Beauties: Reawakening Fashion."
