= Public Fiction =

Public Fiction is a curatorial project and quarterly publication based in Los Angeles. It was founded in 2010 by Lauren Mackler.

Graphic designer and curator Lauren Mackler moved from the east coast to L.A. to open Public Fiction in 2010. Public Fiction resides in an unmarked storefront in the Highland Park neighborhood of Los Angeles. Neither a commercial gallery nor a not-for-profit organization, the space hosts exhibitions for three months on a theme, within which are staged solo shows, group shows, performances, artist talks, screenings, and dinners, connected to that theme, all of it culminating into a publication. The publication, inspired by other artist multiples such as Aspen, Semina by Wallace Berman and Vision magazine, includes a record of everything that happened within the series, but also presents new and additional content.

Though the space had already hosted several one night events, Public Fiction's first official exhibition, "Public Records," transformed the gallery into a "record" store, with a play on words between "collecting" and "archiving". The show centered on music, archives, and collections. For "The Free Church," its second show, artists turned the space into different iterations of a spiritual space for worship. The third iteration of the project was called the Manifest Destiny / Gold Rush series and addressed the impulse to move West, ambition and the economy. For this three-month period, one month was dedicated to a show of California artists on Entrepreneurialism, the second staged a functioning Hotel for east coast artists to come work west and the third presented a solo installation by artist David Hendren depicting a post-earthquake interior. The fourth Public Fiction series was held at the MoCA Geffen contemporary and was called "The Club". Mackler created a space and organized events addressing of social clubs, night clubs, and art clubs. Laura Owens did the poster for the series. The fifth series, was called "Theatricality and Sets" where for three months Public Fiction hosted an exhibition of artist using props, creating sets or staging a theater. The publication for this issue was called "The Lost Issue" and made jointly with "Lost In LA" a show curated by former Palais de Tokyo director Marc-Olivier Wahler. For the following "Foreign Correspondent" series, the whole space was turned into an anonymous office. In this presentation, the journal came out as a broadsheet, one week at a time, as Dispatches, the broadsheets each presented an artist on one side and a writer on the other, the participants included Camille Henrot, Charlie White, Jonathan Lethem, Neil Beloufa, Sarah Lehrer-Graiwer and more.

In 2012, writer Andrew Berardini and Mackler the curated “Treating Shadows as Real Things,” in Torino at the Chapel of the Holy Shroud, Artists for this exhibition included Lucas Blalock, Anthony Lepore, Sarah Cain, Andrea Longacre-White, Giorgio de Chirico, Carlo Mollino, Samara Golden, Ry Rocklen, Mark Hagen. The Exhibition was presented as a tangent to the Artissima art Fair. Mackler and Berardini also organized "Set Pieces" at Milan gallery Cardi Black Box, including and inspired by the work of William Leavitt.

In 2013, "The Stand In", an exhibition inspired by the surrealist model of the "exhibition as a medium", re-exhibited the same artists three times, for one month each. This was a collaboration with Alexandra Gaty.

For the 2014 Frieze Art Fair in New York, Public Fiction and Allen Ruppersberg reinvented "Al’s Grand Hotel", a project initially created by Ruppersberg in 1971 in Los Angeles. The hotel originally was open for six weeks and acted as a site for happenings, parties, performances and a place to sleep. Al's Grand Hotel was restaged as a fully functioning hotel installed within the fair, with two rooms, and a lobby. Visitors could become guests of the hotel and were allowed to book rooms to spend the night.

Public Fiction was included in the 2014 Made in LA Biennial at the Hammer Museum, curated by Michael Ned Holte and Cornelia Butler. Mackler co-organized a double exhibition, within the main exhibition, titled "A Public Fiction" and "Tragedy + Time" with writer / curator Sarah Lehrer-Graiwer. The duo created a multifaceted and episodic series with revolving exhibitions taking place at the Hammer, Public Fiction's store front, and within a publication.
