= Peter de Cupere =

Belgian artist

- Born: Leuven, Belgium
- Occupation: Olfactory artist

Peter de Cupere (born 1970 in Leuven, Belgium) is an olfactory artist who lives and works in Antwerp. De Cupere creates work intended to explore experiences of smelling.

As part of his olfactory art practice, De Cupere explores technology. He invented the "Olfactio" in collaboration with Cartamundi. In collaboration with Gluon, Callebaut and chocolatier Patrick Mertens, he invented "Cocoa 5 Senses". Starting in 1997 and going on until 2004 he invented the first working scent piano, called Olfactiano.The Aesthetics of Smelly Art In 2012 he invented The Blind Smell Stick and The Blind Smell Touch. These smell devices let the spectators find their way or experience objects and food just by smelling. It was exhibited for the first time in the World Creativity Biennale in Rio de Janeiro in 2012.

== Curation ==
As a curator, in 2015 he initiated the exhibition ″The Smell of War″, which included other prominent olfactory artists such as Maki Ueda, Clara Ursitti, Christophe Laudamiel, Oswaldo Macia, Lisa Kirk and more.

Interested in mobile installations, he also created ″The Olfactory″ in 2014, a travelling container project that presented 33 one day olfactory art exhibitions in 7 weeks

== Teaching and Education ==
Peter de Cupere is a tutor affiliated with the ″PXL-MAD School of Arts″ in Hasselt, Belgium and a researcher. He has done a PhD research and received his doctor title at the PXL MAD School of Arts in Hasselt, BE in collaboration with the University of Hasselt, BE and the Free University of Brussels, BE. He has two master's degrees and a Laureate degree in Fine Arts. As a tutor he is the joint founder of the Open Lab where he teaches the use of the approximative senses, smell, taste and touch in the Senses Lab.

In 2014 Peter de Cupere wrote The Olfactory Art Manifest. On August 11, 2014, 101 years after the manifest of Carlo Carra “La Pittura dei suoni, rumori, odori: Manifesto futurista” (The Painting of Sounds, Noises, Smells: Futurist Manifesto), Peter de Cupere signed his Olfactory Art manifest with his own smell. After two years of intensively collecting his bodily smells, he got only a small bottle ‘Own Smell’ at his disposal. With this smell extract he signed the manifest. The manifest has been shown in several exhibitions; Belle Haleine, The scent of Art in the Tinguely Museum in Basel, CH, as in the exhibition There's Something in the Air! at Villa Rot, Burgrieden, DE

== Publications ==
- Scent in Context, Olfactory Art, 2016, published by Stockmans Publishers. ISBN 978-9077207338
- The Smell of War

== Articles ==
- Art for the Knowing Nose, NY Times,2015
- Peter De Cupere's 'Blind Smell Stick' Helps You Find Your Way Using Your Nostrils, Huffington Post, 2012
- Peter De Cupere's Olfactory Art Generates Unique Multi-Sensory Experience, Huffington Post, 2012
- ‘Olfacio’ Smell App Is A Dream Come True For Olfactory Artist Peter De Cupere, Huffington Post, 2013
- Peter De Cupere: Olfactory Art
- Peter De Cupere, annusando Palermo. Passeggiata olfattiva in città, Artribune, 2015
- Peter de Cupere: el artista que crea con olores, El Dominical
- Three Belgian scent specialists discuss cities’ olfactory perceptions, The Word Magazine
- Peter de Cupere: Scent in Context: Olfactory Art, Critique d'Art
- Peter de Cupere's “Smoke Flowers” in Venice, Scent Art Net, by Ashraf Osman, 2016
- Solo exhibition by Peter De Cupere at Concordia in Enschede (NL), Art Flanders
- Peter De Cupere, Deflowering, Artribune

== Education and Residency Programs ==
- 2005-2006 Cite Internationale des Arts, Paris, France
- 2000 Akademie der Künste, Berlin, Germany
- 1996-1999 Hisk - Higher Institute For Fine Arts, Flanders – Antwerp, Belgium
- 1994-1996 Fine arts Higher Institute Sint Lucas, Brussels, Belgium
- 1989-1993 PIKOH Fine Arts, Hasselt, Belgium
