= The Art and Olfaction Awards =

Award

- Type: Non-profit
- Industry: Perfume, Art, Olfactory art
- Founded: 2013
- Headquarters: Los Angeles
- Area served: Worldwide
- Parent: The Institute for Art and Olfaction
- Website: artandolfaction.com/awards

The Art and Olfaction Awards are a non-profit award mechanism designed to celebrate excellence in international artisan, experimental and independent perfumery and olfactory art through a yearly blind-judged competition.

== Mission ==
The organization states the following as its mission:

"The Art and Olfaction Award is designed to raise interest and awareness for independent and artisan perfumers - and experimental practitioners with scent - from all countries. By shining a spotlight on perfumery's most outstanding creators, we hope to help generate support for independent practices in perfumery as a whole. The Art and Olfaction Awards are a program of The Institute for Art and Olfaction, a 501(c)3 non-profit organization based in Los Angeles, USA."

== History ==
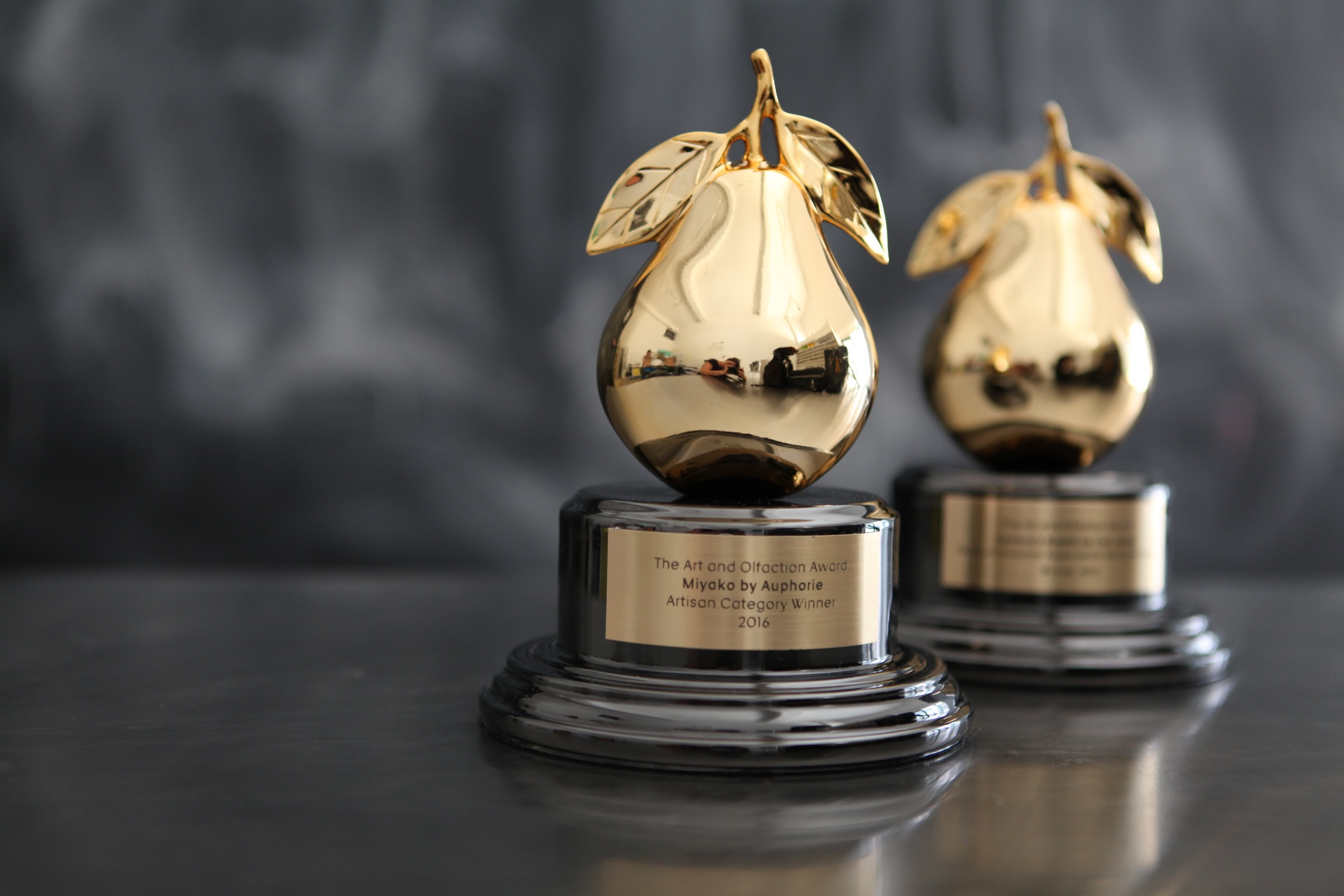
Two Golden Pear statuettes, awarded at the 2016 Art and Olfaction Awards in Los Angeles.

The Art and Olfaction Awards were founded by Saskia Wilson-Brown in 2013 as a program of The Institute for Art and Olfaction in Los Angeles. The awards were inspired by a conversation between Wilson-Brown and perfumer Bruno Fazzolari, who suggested the idea.

The first awards ceremony took place in April, 2014, at Goethe Institut Los Angeles. At this first event, awards were given in two categories: Independent and Artisan.

In 2015, the awards expanded upon their existing categories by adding The Sadakichi Award for Experimental Work with Scent - named after the critic and writer Sadakichi Hartmann in honor of his failed scent concert from the early 20th century. The Sadakichi Award was added as "a new category aimed at recognizing innovative uses of scent beyond the bounds of commercial perfumery" - joining the artisan and independent awards to create what was intended as a broad snapshot of the diversity and creative potential in the field of perfume.

The third annual Art and Olfaction Awards were held on May 6, 2016 at Hammer Museum as part of their public programming. The expanded event was hosted by artist and producer Zackary Drucker, and was free, open to the public, and live streamed on the internet.

In an effort to better cement the award's international commitment, the fourth annual Art and Olfaction Awards took place in May 2017 at Silent Green kulturquartier in Berlin, after which the awards continued to travel to different countries: The fifth awards took place at The Tabernacle, Notting Hill in London (April 21, 2018), and the sixth awards took place at Oude Kerk, Amsterdam in Amsterdam (May 2, 2019).

In 2020, the awards were held online due to the pandemic. Because of the pandemic, also, the awards were not held in 2021. They returned for the eighth edition in 2022, being hosted in Miami as part of the World Perfumery Congress.

In 2023 they returned to Los Angeles, at the Cicada Club. It was in 2023 also that the Institute for Art and Olfaction launched a week long festival of scent called Scent Week, which was designed to celebrate independent perfumery in the region, in an international context.

From 2024 onwards, the Institute for Art and Olfaction opted to regularly host the awards in different cities. On odd numbered years the awards would be held in Los Angeles, and on even numbered years they would be held in a new city, outside the United States. In 2024 the awards were held in Lisbon at Casa do Alentejo, and in 2025, for the twelfth edition, they were held in Los Angeles again—again in the context of the Scent Week festival. For several years, the finalists were announced in Italy, at Esxencein Milan.

The Art and Olfaction Awards were created as mechanism to impartially judge and promote work being done by artisan perfumers, independent perfume houses, and creative practitioners working with scent in the context of arts or experimental practices. Limited to artists, artisan perfumers and independent perfume houses (which they define as brands that are independently owned, or owned by another independently owned company), they are closed to larger-scale perfume releases - a space already served by The Fragrance Foundation's Awards. Founder Saskia Wilson-Brown explained it in an interview:

″The awards are for independent, artisan and experimental practitioners with scent. And by independent brands we mean folks that have a company that is not owned by a conglomerate. There are different understandings of artisan, and we’ve had many debates about this, but as it stands it refers to companies or brands that are owned or co-owned by the perfumer who makes the formulas, so the creative is at the top."

In that capacity they have been compared to the film industry's Independent Spirit Awards. Indeed, the awards were created based on founder Saskia Wilson-Brown's experience with film festivals:

"The awards represented a chance to apply what I learned in the film festival world to the perfume world. In fact, we adapted many of the structures that go into running a film festival for the Art and Olfaction Awards, namely: Low entry fees, [...] unbiased judging (in many film festivals you are excluded from judging a film that you have a personal tie to), a diversity of judges, and a non-profit art for arts-sake motivation."

Several further systems were put into place to ensure fairness, including blind, multiple-phase judging. Additional systems included a code of ethics, which listed several points the judges were expected to adhere to, including recusing themselves from any submission that they recognized or had a financial stake in. The result was what Luca Turin called '[...]the only fluff-free fragrance contest in the world.

Each edition of the awards has two artisan category winners, two independent category winners, and one Experimental Work with Scent winner. In 2018 and subsequent years, additional categories were added by the organization, including the Art and Olfaction Contribution to Scent Culture Award, the Art and Olfaction Visionary Award, and the Art and Olfaction Newcomer Award. Winners each receive a golden pear statuette.

The Art and Olfaction Awards has an iterative logo designed by California Institute of the Arts graduate Micah Hahn. The logo design changes with every year the awards are held.

== Judges ==
Judges for the Art and Olfaction Awards are pulled from creative fields, internationally. Notable judges have included writer Andrew Berardini, cultural critic Arabelle Sicardi, artist Bettina Hubby, perfumer Christophe Laudamiel, chef Daniel Patterson, writer Harold McGee, perfume expert Katie Puckrik, critic and biochemist Luca Turin, artist Maki Ueda, perfumer Mandy Aftel, artist Marcos Lutyens, artist Peter De Cupere, designer Stefan Sagmeister, artist Steven Gontarski, artist Zoe Crosher, and more.

== Art and Olfaction Awards Winners, Finalists and Honorable Mentions ==
Juried Awards

- Art and Olfaction Award for Artisan Perfume
- Art and Olfaction Award for Independent Perfume
- Art and Olfaction Award for Experimental Work with Scent (known as the Sadakichi Award)

Discretionary Awards

- Art and Olfaction Contribution to Scent Culture Award
- Art and Olfaction Visionary Award (known as the Septimus Piesse Visionary Award)
- Art and Olfaction Newcomer Award

Past Awards

- Aftel Award for Handmade Perfume

=== The Art and Olfaction Award for Artisan Perfume ===
The Art and Olfaction Award for Artisan Perfume is open to brands that are owned or co-owned (minimum 35% ownership) by the brand's primary perfumer, who initiated and created the submitted perfume's formula in-house.

==== Winners and Finalists ====
Year	Winners	Finalists
2014	Calling All Angels by April Aromatics (Perfumer: Tanja Bochnig) John Frum by Aether Arts (Perfumer: Amber Jobin)	• Blackbird by Olympic Orchids (Perfumer: Ellen Covey) • Calling All Angels by April Aromatics (Perfumer: Tanja Bochnig) • Golden Hour by Artemisia Natural Perfumes (Perfumer: Lisa Fong) • John Frum by Aether Arts (Perfumer: Amber Jobin) • Lampblack by Bruno Fazzolari (Fzotic); (Perfumer: Bruno Fazzolari) • Magnolia Esxentials by Cristiano Canali (Perfumer: Cristiano Canali) • Mosaic by Imaginary Authors (Perfumer: Josh Meyer) • Owl by Sweet Anthem Perfumes (Perfumer: Meredith Smith) • Sensei by Piotr Czarnecki (Perfumer: Piotr Czarnecki) • Vesper by Mik Moi (Perfumer: Michael Coyle)
2015	Eau de Céleri by Monsillage (Perfumer: Isabelle Michaud) Woodcut by Olympic Orchids (Perfumer: Ellen Covey)	• A City on Fire by Imaginary Authors (Perfumer: Josh Meyer) • Eau de Céleri by Monsillage (Perfumer: Isabelle Michaud) • Foxglove by DS & Durga (Perfumer: David Seth Moltz) • Tobacco Cognac by House of Cherry Bomb (Perfumers: Maria McElroy & Alexis Karl) • Woodcut by Olympic Orchids (Perfumer: Ellen Covey)
2016	INCENDO by La Curie (Perfumer: Lesli Wood) Miyako by Auphorie (Perfumer: Zhe You “Eugene” Au)	• Albino (A Study in White) by DSH Perfumes (Perfumer: Dawn Spencer Hurwitz) • Bird of Paradise by Thorn & Bloom Perfume (Perfumer: Jennifer Botto) • Cape Cod Wild Beach Rose by Nomaterra Fragrances (Perfumer: Agnieszka Burnett) • INCENDO by La Curie (Perfumer: Lesli Wood) • Love for 3 Oranges by Aether Arts Perfume (Perfumer: Amber Jobin) • Miyako by Auphorie (Perfumer: Zhe You “Eugene” Au) • Musk Rose Attar by Rising Phoenix Perfumery (Perfumer: Joseph DeLapp) • Namibia by Frazer Parfum (Perfumer: Tammy Frazer) • Peach Tree Garden by Phoenix Botanicals (Perfumer: Irina Adam) • Salome by Papillon Perfumery (Perfumer: Liz Moores)
2017	Bruise Violet by Sixteen92 (Perfumer: Claire Baxter) Mélodie de l'Amour by Parfums Dusita (Perfumer: Pissara Umavijani)	• Baraonda by Nasomatto (Perfumer: Alessandro Gualtieri) • Bruise Violet by Sixteen92 (Perfumer: Claire Baxter) • Ceremony by Mirus Fine Fragrance (Perfumer: Neal Peters) • Fatih Sultan Mehmed by Fort and Manlé Parfum (Perfumers: Rasei Fort & Al Manlé (Ali Erkekli)) • Limestone by Thorn & Bloom (Perfumer: Jennifer Botto) • Liquorice Vetiver by SP Parfums (Perfumer: Sven Pritzkoleit) • Mélodie de l'Amour by Parfums Dusita (Perfumer: Pissara Umavijani) • Onycha by DSH Perfumes (Perfumer: Dawn Spencer Hurwitz) • Rosuerrier by Pryn Parfum (Perfumer: Prin Lomros) • Saffron by Aether Arts Perfume (Perfumer: Amber Jobin) • Vanilla and the Sea by Phoenix Botanicals (Perfumer: Irina Adam)
2018	Chienoir by BedeauX Ltd (Perfumer: Amanda Beadle) CLUB DESIGN by The Zoo (Perfumer: Christophe Laudamiel)	• Bee's Bliss by Sonoma Scent Studio (Perfumer: Laurie Erickson) • Chienoir by BedeauX Ltd (Perfumer: Amanda Beadle) • Cigar Rum by Strangers Parfum (Perfumer: Prin Lomros) • CLUB DESIGN by The Zoo (Perfumer: Christophe Laudamiel) • Impressions de Giverny by Fort and Manle (Perfumer: Rasei Fort) • Morah by Pryn Parfum / Art Parfum Co. (Perfumer: Prin Lomros) • Silphium by Stora Skuggan (Perfumers: Tomas Hempel & Olle Hemmendorff) • Touchstone by Aether Arts Perfume (Perfumer: Amber Jobin) • Villa M by Paul Schütze Perfume (Perfumer: Paul Schütze) • Wonderly by The House of Oud (Perfumer: Andrea Casotti)
2019	Hyde by Hiram Green (Perfumer: Hiram Green) Powder & Dust by SP PARFUMS (Perfumers: Sven Pritzkoleit & Yana Lysenko Tommelise)	• 15 by OSM - Olfactory Sense Memory (Perfumer: Kyle Mott-Kannenberg) • Carré Blanc by THE ZOO (Perfumers: Christophe Laudamiel & Andrew Everett) • Gardener's Glove by St. Clair Scents (Perfumer: Diane St. Clair) • Hyde by Hiram Green (Perfumer: Hiram Green) • Irisistible by April Aromatics (Perfumer: Tanja Bochnig) • L’Anima Della Rosa by Auphorie (Perfumers: Eugene Au Zhe You & Emrys Au Zhe Min) • La Bibliothèque by NeZ ZeN (Perfumer: Romain Pantoustier) • Powder & Dust by SP PARFUMS (Perfumers: Sven Pritzkoleit & Yana Lysenko Tommelise) • Rosé All Daé by Gallagher Fragrances (Perfumer: Daniel Gallagher) • Violeta by Jade Daisy Perfumes (Perfumer: Stacey Lazzara)
2020	Bonsai by House of Matriarch (Perfumer: Christi Meshell) Nimbis by Parallax Olfactory (Perfumer: Linda Sivrican)	• Absinthe-Minded by Anka Kuş Parfüm (Perfumer: Ali Erkekli) • Bonsai by House of Matriarch (Perfumer: Christi Meshell) • Eve by St. Clair Scents (Perfumer: Diane St. Clair) • Fall by Criminal Elements (Perfumer: Corey Newcombe) • Impermanence by Christèle Jacquemin (Perfumer: Christèle Jacquemin) • Keman by DI SER (Perfumer: Rajesh Balkrishnan) • Nepenthe by En Voyage Perfumes (Perfumer: Shelley Waddington) • Nimbis by Parallax Olfactory (Perfumer: Linda Sivrican) • OBO #302 by OK Fine Fragrances (Perfumer: Michael Simpson) • Perfumista by Anatole Lebreton (Perfumer: Anatole Lebreton) • Rasa by Pomares Stolen Perfume (Perfumer: Rachel Binder) • Weinstrasse by Chatillon Lux (Perfumer: Shawn Maher) • Wild Child by COGNOSCENTI (Perfumer: Dannielle Sergent)
2022	Mayan Chocolate by Aether Arts Perfumes (Perfumer: Amber Jobin) Oolong Tea by One Day (Perfumer: Michael Wong)	• Angora Oud by Gallup Perfume (Perfumer: Amyllia Gallup) • Behold, Patchouli by Gallagher Fragrances (Perfumers: Daniel Gallagher & Mindy Ruiz) • Celadawn by Matteo Parfums (Perfumer: Matthew J. Sánchez) • Divined by Mobius Fragrances (Perfumer: Tianyou Lou / Lorenzo L) • Great Wall Valley by Scent Strip Perfume (Perfumer: Jill Croquet) • Mayan Chocolate by Aether Arts Perfumes (Perfumer: Amber Jobin) • Oolong Tea by One Day (Perfumer: Michael Wong) • This Ember by Anka Kuş Parfüm (Perfumer: Ali Erkekli) • Voice from the Sky by Gentle King (Perfumer: Tianle Feng) • Zanzibar by Olfactum Fragrances (Perfumer: Barry Southers)
2023	Tabacco Smeraldo by Miguel Matos (Perfumer: Miguel Matos) Voices by House of Mammoth (Perfumer: Benjamin Esposito)	• Alter Oud by d. grayi (Perfumer: James Miju) • Encore du Temps by Meo Fusciuni (Perfumer: Giuseppe Imprezzabile) • Filament by nosey.people.society (Perfumer: Breanne Patterson) • Garden Heaux by Samar (Perfumers: Na-Moya Lawrence & Debbie Lin) • La Tacita de Café by Day Three Fragrances (Perfumer: Michael Paul) • Osmanthus Floral by Neshama Perfume (Perfumer: Simon Shaer) • Solario by Osmofola (Perfumer: Sab Finn) • Tabacco Smeraldo by Miguel Matos (Perfumer: Miguel Matos) • Tatami Dreams by Tavie Belle (Perfumer: Lavinia Cheng) • Voices by House of Mammoth (Perfumer: Benjamin Esposito)
2024	Grove is in the Heart by SAMAR (Perfumers: Na-Moya Lawrence & Debbie Lin) Molotov Cocktail by Sylhouette Parfums (Perfumer: Sy Truong)	• Bal Baroque by Olentium (Perfumer: Elizabeth Grech) • Eustache by Jolie Laide Perfume (Perfumer: Heather Kaufman) • Grove is in the Heart by SAMAR (Perfumers: Na-Moya Lawrence & Debbie Lin) • Irida Extrait by Angelos Créations Olfactives (Perfumer: Angelos Balamis) • Molotov Cocktail by Sylhouette Parfums (Perfumer: Sy Truong) • Sweet Celestials by Strangers Parfumerie (Perfumer: Prin Lomros) • Taipei by ONE DAY (Perfumer: WaiHang Wong) • Warm Bulb by Clue Perfumery (Perfumer: Laura Oberwetter) • WEALTH 4181 by PERFUME.SUCKS (Perfumer: Andreas Wilhelm)
2025	Mekha Aranya by SIAM1928 (Perfumer: Nutt Wesshasartar) Mint Rose EDP by OrdioLab (Perfumer: Jerry Lin)	• 1747 by Rivendare (Perfumer: David Clarke) • Alice by Element Experimental Aroma Lab (Perfumer: Emily van Oosterom) • Blue Marble by St. Clair Scents (Perfumer: Diane St. Clair) • Grandma's Closet by Yenchi Lin (Perfumer: Yenchi Lin) • Mekha Aranya by SIAM1928 (Perfumer: Nutt Wesshasartar) • Meraura by NUSA art of scent (Perfumer: Abdullah Al Roman) • Mint Rose EDP by OrdioLab (Perfumer: Jerry Lin) • Pine by Stora Skuggan (Perfumer: Tomas Hempel) • The Space Between by fūm (Perfumer: Miss Layla) • You & I (Will Die) by House of Mammoth (Perfumer: Benjamin Esposito)
2026	Aethi Opum by Maya Njie (Perfumer: Maya Njie) Death by Vanity by Rivendare (Perfumer: David Clarke)	• Aethi Opum by Maya Njie (Perfumer: Maya Njie) • Ambrosia by Aysha Hansen Fine Fragrances (Perfumer: Aysha Hansen) • Dandelion Butter by Clue Perfumery (Perfumer: Laura Oberwetter with Caleb Vanden Boom) • Death by Vanity by Rivendare (Perfumer: David Clarke) • DinoS'mores by House of Mammoth (Perfumer: Benjamin Esposito with Nate Audette) • Eclipse by Ermetiche Fragranze (Perfumer: Raffaella Meccheri) • Hoàng Trà by Maison de Nguyễn (Perfumer: Nguyen Do with Chu Tran) • Hotteok by KST Scent (Perfumer: James Miju Nguyen with Kael Jeong, Minhy Pham) • Snippid by House of Mammoth (Perfumer: Benjamin Esposito) • Vanitas by LVNEA Perfume (Perfumer: April Lea)

==== Honorable Mentions ====
Year	Recipient
2023	American Pharaoh by Folkwinds (USA) (Perfumer: Jono Bernstein) Enlightenment by Christèle Jacquemin (Perfumer: Christèle Jacquemin) Lunar Dust by Mabelle O’rama (Perfumer: Mabelle Abi Ramia) No. 44 - Fire and Rain by COGNOSCENTI (Perfumer: Dannielle Sargent) Red Skies by Maher Olfactive (Perfumer: Shawn Maher)
2024	Arabian Jasmine by Amer Perfumes (Perfumer: Amer AlRadhi) Burning Piano by Nose of Gatsby (Perfumer: Su-Jung Yeh) Concrete Forest by Strangers Parfumerie (Perfumer: Prin Lomros) QH by Redolescent (Perfumer: Kyle Fearn) Scylla by Aether Arts Perfume (Perfumer: Amber Jobin)
2025	Jasmine Dragon by Sifr Aromatics (Perfumer: Johari Kazura) Nébuleuse Bleu by Chouette Vierge Parfumée (Perfumer: Hoang Nguyen & Thanh Nam Bui) No-Mow May by 4160 Tuesdays (Perfumer: Sarah McCartney) Provenance by Qhue New York (Perfumer: Quentin Hernandez) Rampai Noir by Fuse Kuala Lumpur (Perfumer: Arfan Ramli)
2026	Lamphun Gold by Perfumers' Journey (Perfumer: Sakul Pawasuttikul) Mezcal & Masa by Aether Arts Perfume (Perfumer: Amber Jobin) Niveous Muse by Kase (Perfumer: George He Song) Plastic Flower by RAW CONTRAST (Perfumer: Hwal Kim) UNMEI by OCO PARFUM (Perfumer: Moon Li)

=== The Art and Olfaction Award for Independent Perfume ===
The Independent category is open to brands that employed an external perfumer or fragrance house to initiate and create the formula for the submitted perfume, which was then released under the brand's name in the year of judging.

==== Winners and Finalists ====
Year	Winners	Finalists
2014	Ashoka by Neela Vermeire Creations (Perfumer: Bertrand Duchaufour, Creative Direction: Neela Vermeire) König by Yosh (Perfumer: Olivia Jan, Creative Direction: Yosh Han)	• Ashoka by Neela Vermeire Creations (Perfumer: Bertrand Duchaufour, Creative Direction: Neela Vermeire) • Blood Sweat Tears by Atelier de Geste (Perfumer: Unknown, Creative Direction: Beau Rhee) • Christopher Street by Charenton Macerations (Perfumer: Ralf Schwieger (Mane), Creative Direction: Unknown) • Feu Follet by Friede Modin (Perfumer: Unknown, Creative Direction: Unknown) • FR!01/02 by Fragrance Republic (Perfumer: Julie Massé, Creative Direction: Unknown) • Jardin Mystique by Friede Modin (Perfumer: Unknown, Creative Direction: Unknown) • König by Yosh (Perfumer: Olivia Jan, Creative Direction: Yosh Han) • Only for Her by Hayari Parfums (Perfumer: Sidonie Lancesseur (Robertet), Creative Direction: Unknown) • Sahraa Oud by Fragrance DuBois (Perfumer: Unknown, Creative Direction: Unknown)
2015	Black Pepper & Sandalwood by Acca Kappa (Perfumer: Luca Maffei, Creative Direction: Elisa Guera) Skive by Canoe (Perfumer: Jessica Hannah, Creative Direction: Natalie Davis)	• Black Pepper & Sandalwood by Acca Kappa (Perfumer: Luca Maffei, Creative Direction: Elisa Guera) • Boccanera by Orto Parisi (Perfumer: Alessandro Gualtieri, Creative Direction: Unknown) • Ombre Indigo by Olfactive Studio (Perfumer: Mylène Alran, Creative Direction: Céline Verleure) • Pashay by Raymond Matts (Perfumer: Christophe Laudamiel, Creative Direction: Raymond Matts) • Skive by Canoe (Perfumer: Jessica Hannah, Creative Direction: Natalie Davis)
2016	Bat by Zoologist Perfumes (Perfumer: Ellen Covey, Creative Direction: Victor Wong) Néa by JUL ET MAD Paris (Perfumer: Luca Maffei, Creative Direction: Madalina Stoïca-Blanchard)	• Bat by Zoologist Perfumes (Perfumer: Ellen Covey, Creative Direction: Victor Wong) • Dark Ride by Xyrena (Perfumer: Killian Wells, Creative Direction: Killian Wells) • Elephant and Roses by Maria Candida Gentile (Perfumer: Maria Candida Gentile, Creative Direction: Maria Candida Gentile) • FOUGERE NOBILE by NOBILE1942 (Perfumer: Anne-Sophie Behaghel, Creative Direction: Stefania Giannino) • Néa by JUL ET MAD Paris (Perfumer: Luca Maffei, Creative Direction: Madalina Stoïca-Blanchard) • Panorama by Olfactive Studio (Perfumer: Clément Gavarry, Creative Direction: Céline Verleure) • Past | Presence by Roads (Perfumer: Jean-Charles Mignon, Creative Direction: Danielle Ryan) • Rose de Taif Extrait by Perris Monte Carlo (Perfumer: Luca Maffei, Creative Direction: Gian Luca Perris) • Salim Attar by Tabacora Parfums (Perfumer: Christian Carbonnel, Creative Direction: Joanna Bak Farana) • Waiheke Dreams by Juliana Parfums Co. (Perfumer: Yves Dombromsky, Creative Direction: Juliana Van Kampen)
2017	Altruist by J.F. Schwarzlose Berlin (Perfumer: Véronique Nyberg, Creative Direction: Lutz Herrmann) Fathom V by BeauFort London (Perfumer: Julie Marlowe, Creative Direction: Leo Crabtree)	• Absolue D'Osmanthe by Perris Monte Carlo (Perfumer: Jean Michel Santorini, Creative Direction: Gian Luca Perris) • Altruist by J.F. Schwarzlose Berlin (Perfumer: Véronique Nyberg, Creative Direction: Lutz Herrmann) • Anti anti by Atelier PMP (Perfumer: Mark Buxton, Creative Direction: Hendrike Heitmann) • Belle de Jour by Eris Parfums (Perfumer: Antoine Lie, Creative Direction: Barbara Herman) • Civet by Zoologist (Perfumer: Shelley Waddington, Creative Direction: Victor Wong) • Close Up by Olfactive Studio (Perfumer: Annick Menardo, Creative Direction: Céline Verleure) • Fathom V by BeauFort London (Perfumer: Julie Marlowe, Creative Direction: Leo Crabtree) • Lankaran Forest by Maria Candida Gentile (Perfumer: Maria Candida Gentile, Creative Direction: Maria Candida Gentile) • Maître Chausseur by Extrait D'Atelier (Perfumer: Not disclosed, Creative Direction: Chiara Ronzani) • Romanza by Masque Milano (Perfumer: Cristiano Canali, Creative Direction: Alessandro Brun) • Stones by Atelier de Geste (Perfumer: Irina Nesa, Creative Direction: Beau Rhee)
2018	L'Eau de Virginie by Au Pays de la Fleur d'Oranger (Perfumer: Jean-Claude Gigodot, Creative Direction: Virginie Roux) Nuit de Bakélite by Naomi Goodsir (Perfumer: Isabelle Doyen, Creative Direction: Naomi Goodsir & Renaud Coutaudier)	• A.E.O.M. by Bijon (Perfumer: Cécile Zarokian, Creative Direction: Oliver Babic) • Ankh Sun Amon by Anima Mundi (Perfumers: Cristian Calabrò & Andrea Casotti, Creative Direction: Emilia Chinigò) • Cacao Azteque Eau de Parfum by Perris Monte Carlo (Perfumer: Mathieu Nardin, Creative Direction: Gian Luca Perris) • Elephant by Zoologist (Perfumer: Chris Bartlett, Creative Direction: Victor Wong) • L'Eau de Virginie by Au Pays de la Fleur d'Oranger (Perfumer: Jean-Claude Gigodot, Creative Direction: Virginie Roux) • London by Gallivant Perfumes (Perfumer: Karine Chevallier, Creative Direction: Nick Steward) • Nuit de Bakélite by Naomi Goodsir (Perfumer: Isabelle Doyen, Creative Direction: Naomi Goodsir & Renaud Coutaudier) • Osang by Talismans – Collezione Preziosa (Perfumer: Giovanni Festa, Creative Direction: Stefania Squeglia) • Pink Heart v.6 by Map of the Heart (Perfumers: Jacques Huclier & Nisrine Grillie, Creative Direction: Sarah Blair, Jeffrey Darling & Giovanna Aicardi) • Rose Olivier by Bastide (Perfumer: Mathieu Nardin, Creative Direction: Frederic Fekkai)
2019	Colorado by American Perfumer (Perfumer: Dawn Spencer Hurwitz, Creative Direction: Dave Kern) Rich Mess by Ryan Richmond (Perfumer: Christophe Laudamiel, Creative Direction: Ryan Richmond)	• Atlante by Sarah Baker (Perfumer: Sarah McCartney, Creative Direction: Sarah Baker) • Birds In Paradise by Régime des Fleurs (Perfumer: Pierre Negrin (Robertet), Creative Direction: Alia Raza & Ezra Woods) • Colorado by American Perfumer (Perfumer: Dawn Spencer Hurwitz, Creative Direction: Dave Kern) • Dulceo by Cūrata (Perfumer: Beckie Sheloske, Creative Direction: Serena Rogers) • Falls by Régime des Fleurs (Perfumer: Mathieu Nardin (Robertet), Creative Direction: Alia Raza & Ezra Woods) • Migration de L’Arbre by Senyokô (Perfumer: Euan McCall, Creative Direction: Joseph & Emilie Berthion) • Rake & Ruin by BeauFort London (Perfumer: Julie Dunkley, Creative Direction: Leo Crabtree) • Red Shoes by Jacques Fath Parfums (Perfumer: Cécile Zarokian, Creative Direction: Rania Naim) • Rich Mess by Ryan Richmond (Perfumer: Christophe Laudamiel, Creative Direction: Ryan Richmond) • Rubacuori by MIRUMest (Perfumer: Dominique Moellhausen, Creative Direction: Fulvio Fronzoni)
2020	Post_Hume by Son Venin (Perfumer: Rosine Courage, Creative Direction: Dag Laska) Young Hearts by Bruno Acampora Profumi (Perfumer: Miguel Matos, Creative Direction: Bruno Acampora)	• 20I20 by J.F. Schwarzlose Berlin (Perfumer: Véronique Nyberg, Creative Direction: Lutz Herrmann) • Accento Overdose by Xerjoff (Perfumer: Christian Carbonnel, Creative Direction: Rosy Ursillo) • Amyi VIII by Amyi (Perfumer: Samuel Morae, Creative Direction: Larissa Mota) • Bee by Zoologist (Perfumer: Cristiano Canali, Creative Direction: Victor Wong) • Behique by Renier Perfumes (Perfumer: Christian Carbonnel, Creative Direction: Renier Rodríguez Méndez) • Ganymede by Marc-Antoine Barrois (Perfumer: Quentin Bisch, Creative Direction: Marc-Antoine Barrois) • Love Kills by Masque Milano (Perfumer: Caroline Dumur, Creative Direction: Alessandro Brun) • Moire by LesNez Parfums d’Auteurs (Perfumer: L.D. Garnier, Creative Direction: René Schifferle) • November, 2019 by Scent Trunk (Perfumer: Tyler Monk, Creative Direction: Travis McIntosh) • Post_Hume by Son Venin (Perfumer: Rosine Courage, Creative Direction: Dag Laska) • Squid by Zoologist (Perfumer: Celine Barel, Creative Direction: Victor Wong) • Young Hearts by Bruno Acampora Profumi (Perfumer: Miguel Matos, Creative Direction: Bruno Acampora)
2022	Aged Tea by Pan Seven International (Perfumer: Pan Yu Ching, Creative Direction: Pan Yu Ching & Huang Chien Shun) Saskia by Grandiflora (Perfumer: Saskia Havekes, Creative Direction: Christophe Laudamiel)	• Aged Tea by Pan Seven International (Perfumer: Pan Yu Ching, Creative Direction: Pan Yu Ching & Huang Chien Shun) • A'MMARE by Carthusia I Profumi di Capri (Perfumer: Luca Maffei (Atelier Fragranze Milano), Creative Direction: Virginia Ruocco) • Basilica by Milano Fragranze (Perfumer: Violaine Collas (Mane), Creative Direction: Alessandro Brun) • Beton Brut by Atelier Oblique (Perfumer: Serge de Oliveira, Creative Direction: Mario Lombardo) • Basilica by Milano Fragranze (Perfumer: Violaine Collas (Mane), Creative Direction: Alessandro Brun) • Gallivant Naples by Gallivant (Perfumer: Luca Maffei (Atelier Fragranze Milano), Creative Direction: Nick Steward) • Lightfalls by Atelier Oblique (Perfumer: Serge de Oliveira (Robertet), Creative Direction: Mario Lombardo) • Libertalia by House of Wanderers (Perfumer: Paul Kiler, Creative Direction: Charlie Romano) • Omen by Manos Gerakinis Parfums (Perfumer: Miguel Matos, Creative Direction: Manos Gerakinis) • Park of the Monsters by In Fieri (Perfumer: Maria Teresa Venezia, Creative Direction: Enrico Buccella) • Saskia by Grandiflora (Perfumer: Saskia Havekes, Creative Direction: Christophe Laudamiel)
2023	Fuchsrot by Bodé Studios (Perfumer: Andreas Wilhelm, Creative Direction: Lino Bottani and Nicola Deflorin) Ierofante by Parfums Quartana (Perfumer: Luca Maffei, Creative Direction: Joseph Quartana)	• Animal Café by Extra Virgo (Perfumer: Michele Marin, Creative Direction: HH. Prince Alex of Limbin) • Flamingo by Blackcliff (Perfumer: Kyle Mott Kannenberg, Creative Direction: Tomilson Bynoe) • Fuchsrot by Bodé Studios (Perfumer: Andreas Wilhelm, Creative Direction: Lino Bottani and Nicola Deflorin) • Hora de la Verdad, Sombra by Senyokô (Perfumer: Euan McCall, Creative Direction: Joseph and Eglantine Berthion) • Ierofante by Parfums Quartana (Perfumer: Luca Maffei, Creative Direction: Joseph Quartana) • Los Angeles by de Kloka X Death & Co (Perfumer: Jackie Brenner, Creative Direction: David Kaplan and Nick Fauchald) • Mansa by Pernoire (Perfumer: Andreas Wilhelm, Creative Direction: Robin Dünner and Nico Mannino) • Room No. by Perfumehead (Perfumer: Constance Georges-Picot, Creative Direction: Daniel Patrick Giles) • Tri-Goddess by Sage Goddess (Perfumer: Alexandra Bisson, Creative Direction: Athena Perrakis) • Wind Blows by QIUHAO (Perfumer: Yili Olfactory Art, Creative Direction: Qiu Hao & Huang Jun)
2024	Amnesia Rose by Aedes de Venustas (Perfumer: Luca Maffei, Creative Direction: Karl Bradl) Kajal IV by Kajal Perfumes Paris (Perfumer: Kévin Mathys, Creative Direction: Moe Khalaf)	• Amnesia Rose by Aedes de Venustas (Perfumer: Luca Maffei, Creative Direction: Karl Bradl) • Call Me by American Perfumer (Perfumer: Dave Kern, Creative Direction: n/a) • Des Cendres by Les Abstraits (Perfumer: Antoine Lie, Creative Direction: Eugen Nizic) • Else by Francesca Dell’Oro (Perfumer: Michele Marin, Creative Direction: Francesca Dell’Oro, Michele Marin) • Gran Gala by Rito (Perfumer: Miguel Matos, Creative Direction: Stefano Torreggiani) • Honeyed Vetiver by American Perfumer (Perfumer: Amber Jobin, Creative Direction: Dave Kern) • Jasmine Gyokuro by Parfums Artimique (Perfumer: Cristiano Canali, Creative Direction: Sara Marzocchini) • Kajal IV by Kajal Perfumes Paris (Perfumer: Kévin Mathys, Creative Direction: Moe Khalaf) • Sidama by Gentleman's Nod (Perfumer: Ugo Charron, Creative Direction: Christopher Christiansen) • Vietnamese Coffee by d'Annam (Perfumer: Anh Ngo, Creative Direction: Nick Hoang)
2025	Bad Lily by TALE Parfum (Perfumer: Michael Nordstrand, Creative Direction: Chad Hodge, Diandra Barsalou) Northern | Crimson Snow by Soulvent (Perfumer: Ciny Ye, Creative Direction: Dennis Zhu, Yvonne Guo)	• Bad Lily by TALE Parfum (Perfumer: Michael Nordstrand, Creative Direction: Chad Hodge, Diandra Barsalou) • Cape Wrath by BeauFort London (Perfumer: Euan McCall, Creative Direction: Leo Crabtree) • Ex Manifattura Tabacchi by Floridia (Perfumer: Giovanni Festa, Creative Direction: Antonio Di Giulio Cesare) • Fifty Four by Jusbox Perfumes (Perfumer: Julien Rasquinet, Creative Direction: Andrea Valdo, Chiara Valdo, with Sebastian Jara) • Northern | Crimson Snow by Soulvent (Perfumer: Ciny Ye, Creative Direction: Dennis Zhu, Yvonne Guo) • Patchouli by Wamaq Perfumes (Perfumer: Amer Al Radhi, Creative Direction: Abdulaziz Yousef) • Principalities by Caeleste (Perfumer: David-Lev Jipa-Slivinschi, Creative Direction: Stefan Radut) • Source by Vallense (Perfumer: Pia Long, Creative Direction: William Borrell) • The Mandala by PARAM SARA (Perfumer: Alex Lee, Creative Direction: Ankita Gill) • Twin Peaks by EPICHRON (Perfumer: Michael Wong, Creative Direction: Jerry Luk & Michael Wong)
2026	Içi, le pas s'arrête by TERRA•T (Perfumer: Kaiwei Hsieh, Creative Direction: Terrence Chen) Nuit Élastique by Première Peau (Perfumer: Ugo Charron, Creative Direction: Pierre Mergui with Susan KLOP, Micol Guieu, and Anastasia Vorontsova)	• Chinese Calligraphy by d'Annam (Perfumer: Anh Ngo, Creative Direction: Nick Hoang) • Crème de Menthe Café by Statik Olfactive (Perfumer: Hez Binkowitz, Creative Direction: Chris Martin) • Deity by Ataraxia (Perfumer: Sy Truong, Creative Direction: Tudor Ristea) • Grounded Hills by DAN LO (Perfumer: Kaiwei Hsieh, Creative Direction: Terrence Chen) • Içi, le pas s'arrête by TERRA•T (Perfumer: Kaiwei Hsieh, Creative Direction: Terrence Chen) • Japanese Whisey by d'Annam (Perfumer: Anh Ngo, Creative Direction: Nick Hoang) • Laban Arruz by NBITOR (Perfumer: Miguel Matos, Creative Direction: Thomas Dennis & Raul Falcon) • Nuit Élastique by Première Peau (Perfumer: Ugo Charron, Creative Direction: Pierre Mergui with Susan KLOP, Micol Guieu, and Anastasia Vorontsova) • Torreja Sacra by NBITOR (Perfumer: Ugo Charron, Creative Direction: Pierre Mergui) • Verdant by Ilé Olomu (Perfumer: Andreas Wilhelm, Creative Direction: Bawo Ijirigho)

==== Honorable Mentions ====
Year	Recipient
2023	Ceremony by In Fieri (Perfumer: Enrico Buccella, Creative Direction: Maria Teresa Venezia) Corpalium by Marlou (Perfumer: Stéphanie Bakouche, Creative Direction: Briac Frocrain) Gold Spot by Sarah Baker (Perfumer: Christian Carbonnel, Creative Direction: Sarah Baker) Tong Ren by Elementals (Perfumer: Alexandre Helwani, Creative Direction: Deana Wyland-Fries) White Whale by Masque Milano (Perfumer: Christian Alori, Creative Direction: Alessandro Brun)
2024	50 by Comporta Perfumes (Perfumer: Stéphanie Bakouche, Creative Direction: Pedro Simões Dias) Incidental Orris by Blackcliff Parfums (Perfumer: Tomilson Bynoe, Creative Direction: Kyle Mott Kannenberg) Kawaguchirun by artepolé (Perfumer: Rujira Trakulyingcharoen (Scent and Sense), Creative Direction: Atthaphorn Santhawee) OCAÑA by NBITOR (Perfumer: Miguel Matos, Creative Direction: Thomas Dennis) Queer de Russie by Nose Republic (Perfumer: Valery Mikhalitsyn (Hedonist), Creative Direction: Ksenia Golovanova)
2025	Matcha Soft Serve by d'Annam (Perfumer: Anh Ngo, Creative Direction: Nick Hoang, Kazuki Yamamoto) Juanillo by Adamo Parfum (Perfumer: Hamid Merati-Kashani, Julien Rasquinet, Christian Provenzano, Michel Almairac, Creative Direction: Antioco Adamo) Bucaro Royal by nBitor (Perfumer: Miguel Matos, Creative Direction: Thomas E. Dennis, Raul Falcon) Tipsy Tuberose by Annindriya (Perfumer: Meabh McCurtin, Creative Direction: Tanja Deurloo) Pyroclasm by BeauFort London (Perfumer: Euan McCall, Creative Direction: Leo Crabtree)
2026	Ethereal Flame by 86 West (Perfumer: Chelsey Owen, Creative Direction: Chris Chambers and Michael Garrett) High Mountain Baozhong Tea by YùYù Limited Company (Perfumer: Yeh Hsiao Ling, Creative Direction: Liu Ting Fang) LÁDANO by D:SOL MMXVI (Perfumer: Delphine Thierry, Creative Direction: Dennis Werner) Land on your mind by VYRO (Perfumer: Jasmine Liu, Creative Direction: Gigi Rong) NIGHTCHILD by EPICHRON (Perfumer: Michael Nordstrand, Creative Direction: Michael Wong)

=== The Art and Olfaction Sadakichi Award for Experimental Work with Scent ===
The experimental category is for creative or experimental practitioners who make use of scent in an unconventional or experimental manner that takes it out of the domain of traditional perfumery. Projects must have been first made public in the year of judging.

==== Winners and Finalists ====
Year	Winners	Finalists
2015	Famous Deaths by Marcel van Brakel, Frederik Duerinck, Wander Eikelboom, Mark Meeuwenoord et al. (Perfumer: various, Creative Direction: various collaborators)	Catalin by Charles Long (Perfumer: Various, Creative Direction: various collaborators) • Chroma by Dawn Spencer Hurwitz (Perfumer: Dawn Spencer Hurwitz) • Crime and Punishment by Michael McGinley, Charles ‘Chuck’ McGinley (Perfumer: Unk, Creative Direction: Noah Bremer and Ben Heywood) • Famous Deaths by Marcel van Brakel, Frederik Duerinck, Wander Eikelboom, Mark Meeuwenoord et al. (Perfumer: various, Creative Direction: various collaborators) • In Libro De Tenebris by Paul Schütze (Perfumer: Paul Schütze)
2016	CENTURY'S BREATH by Cat Jones (Perfumer: Cat Jones)	• CENTURY'S BREATH by Cat Jones (Perfumer: Cat Jones) • Dear Enemy by Christy Gast (Perfumer: Christy Gast) • Signal by Carrie Paterson (Perfumer: Carrie Paterson) • The Juice of War - Hiroshima & Nagasaki by Maki Ueda (Perfumer: Maki Ueda) • Western Drive by Kellen Walker (Perfumer: Kellen Walker)
2017	OSMODRAMA BERLIN 2016 via SMELLER 2.0 by Wolfgang Georgsdorf (Perfumer: Geza Schoen)	• Is This Mankind by Peter de Cupere (Perfumer: Various) • OSMODRAMA BERLIN 2016 via SMELLER 2.0 by Wolfgang Georgsdorf (Perfumer: Geza Schoen) • Paradise Paradoxe by Elodie Pong (Perfumer: Anonymouse) • Smell of Data by Leanne Wijnsma (Perfumer: Leanne Wijnsma) • The Feelies: Multisensory Storytelling by Nadjib Achaibou & Grace Boyle (Perfumer: Nadjib Achaibou & Grace Boyle)
2018	Under the Horizon by Oswaldo Macia (Perfumer: Ricardo Moya)	• Olfactory Games by Maki Ueda (Perfumer: Various Perfumers) • Smoke Flowers by Peter de Cupere (Perfumer: IFF Design Scent Team Bernardo Fleming, Meahb Mc Curtin, Laura French, Gregoire Hausson, Marine Hetheier) • The Library of Smell by Various (Perfumer: Mika Shirasu, Creative Direction: Hisako Inoue with Anne Marr) • Under the Horizon by Oswaldo Macia (Perfumer: Ricardo Moya) • Whoa (Pineapple Nails) by Aleesa Cohene (Perfumer: Aleesa Cohene)
2019	Diary of Smells: Glass Ceiling by Josely Carvalho (Perfumer: Leandro Petit (Givaudan))	• Diary of Smells: Glass Ceiling by Josely Carvalho (Perfumer: Leandro Petit (Givaudan)) • Every Word Was Once an Animal by Carla Bengtson (Perfumer: Carla Bengtson) • Smell Forward by Priscille Jotzu (Perfumer: Andreas Wilhelm) • Tangible Scents - Composition of Rose by Maki Ueda (Perfumer: Maki Ueda) • Veneno by Miguel Matos (Perfumer: Christian Carbonnel)
2020	Jónsi by Jónsi Birgisson (Perfumer: Jónsi Birgisson)	• Cerca (Closer) by Pablo Eduardo Schanton (Perfumer: Various (IFF)) • Jónsi by Jónsi Birgisson (Perfumer: Jónsi Birgisson) • Notes by Lauren Jetty (Perfumer: Lauren Jetty with Renske van Vroonhoven (Attic Lab), Creative Direction: Not Applicable) • Olfactory Labyrinth V. 5: Invisible Footprints by Maki Ueda (Perfumer: Maki Ueda) • Tree VR by Milica Zec (Perfumer: Laurent Le Guernec (IFF))
2022	Viral Parfum by Maki Ueda (Perfumer: Maki Ueda)	• Memory Bar by Thomas Buckley (Perfumer: Renske van Vroonhoven (Attic Lab)) • Olfabet by Peter de Cupere (Perfumer: Peter de Cupere) • Pulse by Charlotte Eta Mumm (Perfumer: Frank Bloem) • Scent in Cinema / Twitch & Sniff Along by Jas Brooks, Tammy Burnstock, Ashlyn Sparrow (Perfumer: Neil Harris (Print-A-Scent)) • Thanatos: Scent of Death Perfume by Eric Fong (Perfumer: Euan McCall (Jorum Studio)) • Viral Parfum by Maki Ueda (Perfumer: Maki Ueda)
2023	Salt Flowers by Peter de Cupere (Perfumer: Peter de Cupere)	• Aerosculpture by Maki Ueda (Perfumer: Maki Ueda, Creative Direction: Not Applicable) • Aquanauts by Pompe Hedengren (Perfumer: Karolina Stockhaus) • Lágrimas, Terra e Crisântemo by Karola Braga (Perfumer: Leandro Petit (Givaudan)) • NEGR-OID by Rhea Dillon (Perfumer: Rhea Dillon) • Scent Clock / The Koepenicker by Patrick Palcic (Perfumer: Patrick Palcic) • Salt Flowers by Peter de Cupere (Perfumer: Peter de Cupere)
2024	Smell & Paste by Jas Brooks and Pedro Lopes (Perfumer: Various)	• Citromancy by Lion Wintersea (aka Hannah Marcus) (Perfumer: Hannah Marie Marcus) • History of a People by Alisa Banks (Perfumer: Alisa Banks) • Scent Poems for Pipeline Plants by Lindsey French & Alex Young (Perfumer: Lindsey French) • Smell & Paste by Jas Brooks and Pedro Lopes (Perfumer: Various) • Smell & Tell by Solene Cauvin-Wirz & Zoe Cogger (Perfumer: Solene Cauvin-Wirz)
2025	Sfumato by Karola Braga (Perfumer: Theo Bibancos)	• Buscando alma by Nina LaMaison (Perfumer: Nina LaMaison) • New olfactory molecules (Hyperflor and E12) by Sean Raspet (Perfumer: Sean Raspet) • Recollection by Georgia Ketels, Cathy Hunt (Perfumer: Erin Adams, Smell Art) • Schmerzh — Memories Don't Evaporate by Olivia Wiederkehr, Live Lab AG, Fachstelle KiöR (Kunst im öffentlichen Raum) Stadt Zürich (Perfumer: Andreas Wilhelm) • Sfumato by Karola Braga (Perfumer: Theo Bibancos)
2026	Goavve-Geabbil (Hyundai Commission) by Máret Ánne Sara (Perfumer: Nadjib Achaibou, Collaborator: Angel Palacios)	• El Espacio Vientre by Delcy Morelos (Perfumer: Nadjib Achaibou) • Goavve-Geabbil (Hyundai Commission) by Máret Ánne Sara (Perfumer: Nadjib Achaibou, Collaborator: Angel Palacios) • Hang Our Gods by Regina Mamou (Perfumer: Regina Mamou) • The Anemoia Device by Cyrus Clarke (Perfumer: Cyrus Clarke, Collaborators: Melo Chen, Nomy Yu, Yuen Zou) • Three Kings by Sigrid Moses-Jacobsen (Perfumer: Sigrid Moses-Jacobsen, Collaborators: Thoranna Bjornsdottir, Christa Obuchowski, Sarah John)

=== The Art and Olfaction Discretionary Awards ===
The following awards are given out on a discretionary basis according to the following criteria:

- Aftel Award for Handmade Perfume (Discontinued)
  - Given to one outstanding small batch perfume that was 100% perfumer-created, in-house, with no use of outsourced compounding or expansion at any stage of the process.
- Art and Olfaction Contribution to Scent Culture Award
  - Given to an outstanding person who has made significant contributions to the proliferation, public awareness, or appreciation of practices with scent and perfumery.
- Art and Olfaction Septimus Piesse Visionary Award
  - This award is given on an annual basis to an outstanding person showing proof of exceptional vision with regards to how scent is used, developed, or imagined.
- Art and Olfaction Newcomer Award (Starting the 12th Annual Art and Olfaction Awards)
  - This award celebrates newcomers to the industry. Awarded to a perfume from a brand who launched their first fine fragrance product to market in 2025.
- Art and Olfaction People's Choice
  - Introduced in 2025 due to community feedback, the People's Choice is an informal game that allows perfume fans to vote for two favorites in the artisan and independent categories.

=== Winners and Finalists ===
==== Aftel Award for Handmade Perfume by Year ====
Year	Perfume	Brand
2018	Pays Dogon	Monsillage
2019	Maderas de Oriente Oscuro	PK Perfumes
2020	Rasa	Pomare's Stolen Perfume
2022	Behold, Patchouli	Gallagher Fragrances

==== Art and Olfaction Contribution to Scent Culture Award by Year ====
Year	Recipient
2017	Christophe Laudamiel
2018	Peter de Cupere
2019	Sissel Tolaas
2022	Nez
2023	Black Perfumers by Elle N., and an international collective of 33 perfumers.
2024	Odeuropa led by Inger Leemans (IFF)
2025	Linda Andrews for The Perfumer's Apprentice
2026	Grant Osborne for Basenotes

==== Art and Olfaction Septimus Piesse Visionary Award By Year ====
Year	Recipients
2019	Algorithmic Perfumery by Frederik Duerinck
2022	Mandy Aftel
2023	Olif by Taylor Ahlmark & Anoria Gilbert for Maak Lab
2024	Pia Long
2025	Anicka Yi
2026	L’Osmothèque, Conservatoire International des Parfums, Accepted by Anne-Cécile Pouant

==== Art and Olfaction Newcomer Award ====
Year	Recipients
2025	Principalities by Caeleste (Perfumer: David-Lev Jipa-Slivinschi, Creative Direction: Stefan Radut)
2026	Water Moon by Oneiros (Perfumer: Anh Ngo, Creative Direction: Thanh Dang)

==== People's Choice Winners ====
Year	Artisan Recipients	Independent Recipients
2025	YOU & I (WILL DIE) by House of Mammoth (Perfumer: Benjamin Esposito)	The Mandala by Param Sara (Perfumer: Alex Lee, Creative Direction: Ankita Gill)
2026	Dandelion Butter by Clue Perfumery (Perfumer: Laura Oberwetter with Caleb Vanden Boom)	Verdant by Ilé Olomu (Perfumer: Andreas Wilhelm, Creative Direction: Bawo Ijirigho)
