= Maki Ueda =

Maki Ueda may refer to:

- Maki Ueda (artist)
- Maki Ueda (wrestler)
