= Christophe Laudamiel =

French perfumer (born 1969)

- Born: 1969 (age 56–57); Clermont-Ferrand, France
- Occupation: Perfumer
- Title: Master Perfumer, DreamAir President, Academy of Perfumery and Aromatics Chief Perfumer, BélAir Lab, Tokyo

Christophe Laudamiel (born 1969) is a French perfumer, chemist, writer and model. He is co-founder and Master Perfumer of DreamAir creative studios in New York City, where he currently resides. In 2019 he was named Chief Perfumer to BélAir Lab in Tokyo: a perfume composition and technology studio newly managed by Rohto Pharmaceuticals. He is a founder and president of the non-profit Academy of Perfumery and Aromatics.

Christophe is the Master Perfumer at Osmo, the digital scent design company, based in New York City.

== Education ==
After winning the French National Chemistry Olympiads in 1986, Laudamiel studied mathematics and physics at Lycée Blaise Pascal in Clermont-Ferrand. After winning a bronze medal at the International Chemistry Olympiad in Helsinki, Finland 1988, he went on and graduated valedictorian with a master's degree in chemistry from the European Higher Institute of Chemistry in Strasbourg, France. 1991. As a Procter & Gamble Teaching Fellow, he taught chemistry and started a PhD at the Massachusetts Institute of Technology in 1991. He dropped out of the PhD program after one year to become teaching assistant in chemistry at Harvard University. In 1994 he joined the Procter & Gamble Creative Perfumery School in Newcastle-upon-Tyne (UK) studying under principal perfumer Allan McRitchie and senior perfumer Christine Cahen. He received his creative perfumery degree in 1997 from the Procter & Gamble European Center in Brussels (Belgium) under the supervision of principal perfumer Robert Lecoq and senior perfumers Catherine Ganahl and Hugo Denutte. He was soon after promoted to senior perfumer by now Victor Mills' Society master perfumer Rafael Trujillo. In 1999, he received the Procter & Gamble Special Recognition Award for his work in fragrance creation, especially in fabric softeners, and for his discoveries of new fragrance molecules and technologies.

In 1999–2000, he briefly studied fine fragrance creation with master perfumer Pierre Bourdon, familiarizing himself with Cool Water, Goodlife, Dolce Vita and Féminité du Bois. In the year 2000, Laudamiel joined International Flavors & Fragrances in Manhattan where he polished his skills alongside perfumer legends Carlos Benaim, Sophia Grojsman and Pierre Wargnye.

== Career ==
Laudamiel rapidly won projects on two of the most prestigious accounts at the time in New York City: Estee Lauder Companies' (Tommy Hilfiger Cool Spray for Woman, 2001) and Polo Blue for men, Ralph Lauren, which was co-created in 2001 with Carlos Benaim and launched in 2002. Polo Blue for men received the FIFI Award "Fragrance Star of the Year" in 2003. Polo Blue for men and Fierce (2002), another fragrance co-authored by Laudamiel and Benaim, were nearly a decade later, still in the top 10 best selling men's fragrances on the US market, some claimed they were in the top 5.

Laudamiel's expertise has afforded him opportunities to participate as a judge on the juries of fragrance competitions. In 2003, he was a jury member for the Royal Fashion Institute in Antwerp, Belgium, and in 2004, he helped judge Gael magazine's and Feeling magazine's fragrances of the year. In April 2014, he was one of main judges for the Institute of Art and Olfaction (IAO) Fragrance Awards.

== Osmography ==
=== Fine Fragrances ===
No.	Year	Fragrance	Brand	Co-Perfumer(s)	Producer	Formula deposited at
1	1999	Lenor Cherry Blossom (and Sahara, same scent)	Lenor		Procter & Gamble	Procter & Gamble
2	2001	Tommy Girl Cool Spray Summer	Tommy Hilfiger	Olivier Polge	Estée Lauder Companies	IFF
3	2002	Fierce	Abercrombie & Fitch	Carlos Bénaïm, Bruno Jonanovic	Boom, now Interparfums	IFF
4	2002	Polo Blue For Men	Ralph Lauren	Carlos Bénaïm, Laurent Bruyère, Pierre Wargnye	L'Oréal USA	IFF
5	2002	Eigenpost for Her	Eigenpost		Eigenpost, South Korea	IFF
6	2002	HN Women	Harvey Nichols UK	Antoine Lie	Harvey Nichols	IFF
7	2003	HN Men	Harvey Nichols UK		Harvey Nichols	IFF
8	2003	Querelle	Monsieur di Mehdi	Jean-Claude Ellena	Monsieur di Mehdi	IFF
9	2003	Infinity	Laurent E. Badessi			IFF
10	2003	Black Elton John Rocks	Slatkin		Slatkin and Co.	IFF
11	2003	Persian Lime and Mimosa	Slatkin		Slatkin and Co.	IFF
12	2003	Happy Heart	Clinique	Olivier Polge	Estée Lauder Companies	IFF
13	2003	Absinthe	Slatkin		Slatkin and Co.	IFF
14	2004	S-Perfume	S-Perfume	Alberto Morillas	S-Perfume	IFF
15	2004	S-ex	S-Perfume		S-Perfume	IFF
16	2005	Agassi My Summer	Aramis		Estée Lauder Companies	IFF
17	2005	Island by Michael Kors	Michael Kors	Loc Dong	Estée Lauder Companies	IFF
18	2005	Wonderful	American Beauty	Pascal Gaurin	Estée Lauder Companies	IFF
19	2005	True Star Gold	Beyoncé Knowles, Tommy Hilfiger		Estée Lauder Companies	IFF
20	2005	Youth Dew Amber Nude	Tom Ford	Josephine Catapano	Estée Lauder Companies	IFF
21	2006	Happy In Bloom	Clinique	Rodrigo Flores-Roux, Jean-Claude Delville	Estée Lauder Companies	IFF
22	2006	Tommy Summer Men	Tommy Hilfiger		Estée Lauder Companies	IFF
23	2006	Burberry London for Women	Burberry	Dominique Ropion, Jean-Marc Chaillan	Interparfums	IFF
24	2006	Cuir de Michelle	Michelle Krell-Kydd		glasspetalsmoke	IFF
25	2006	Island Fiji by Michael Kors	Michael Kors	Loc Dong	Estée Lauder Companies	IFF
26	2006	Pure White Linen	Estée Lauder	Jean-Marc Chaillan, Sophie Labbé, Yves Cassar	Estée Lauder Companies	IFF
27	2006	Virgin N°1	Thierry Mugler & Constantin Film	Christoph Hornetz	Clarins	IFF
28	2006	Sea	Thierry Mugler & Constantin Film		Clarins	IFF
29	2006	Salon Rouge	Thierry Mugler & Constantin Film		Clarins	IFF
30	2006	Paris 1738	Thierry Mugler & Constantin Film		Clarins	IFF
31	2006	Orgie	Thierry Mugler & Constantin Film	Christoph Hornetz	Clarins	IFF
32	2006	Nuit Napolitaine	Thierry Mugler & Constantin Film		Clarins	IFF
33	2006	Noblesse	Thierry Mugler & Constantin Film		Clarins	IFF
34	2006	Human Existence	Thierry Mugler & Constantin Film		Clarins	IFF
35	2006	Ermite	Thierry Mugler & Constantin Film		Clarins	IFF
36	2006	Boutique Baldini	Thierry Mugler & Constantin Film		Clarins	IFF
37	2006	Baby	Thierry Mugler & Constantin Film	Christoph Hornetz	Clarins	IFF
38	2006	Aura	Thierry Mugler & Constantin Film	Christoph Hornetz	Clarins	IFF
39	2006	Atelier Grimal	Thierry Mugler & Constantin Film		Clarins	IFF
40	2006	Amor & Psyche	Thierry Mugler & Constantin Film		Clarins	IFF
41	2006	Absolute Jasmin	Thierry Mugler & Constantin Film		Clarins	IFF
42	2006	Skarb	Humiecki & Graef		Art of Shaving	IFF
43	2007	Theo Fennel	Theo Fennel	Domitille Michalon-Bertier	Theo Fennel	IFF
44	2007	Kirra for Women	Pacific Sunwear			IFF
45	2007	Kirra for Men	Pacific Sunwear			IFF
46	2007	Ruehl N°925 Cologne R-7 for Men	Ruehl		Boom	IFF
47	2007	Amber Absolute	Tom Ford		Estée Lauder Companies	IFF
48	2007	Le Baiser de L'Artiste	Orlan		Philippe Martinez and Bookstorming	IFF
49	2007	Orlan Corps	Orlan		Philippe Martinez and Bookstorming	IFF
50	2007	Sainte Orlan	Orlan		Philippe Martinez and Bookstorming	IFF
51	2008	U by Ungaro for Her	Ungaro	Jean-Marc Chaillan, Laurent Le Guernec, Loc Dong		IFF
52	2008	White Linen, Pink Coral	Estée Lauder	Jean-Marc Chaillan	Estée Lauder Companies	IFF
53	2008	Happy in Bloom 2008	Clinique		Estée Lauder Companies	IFF
54	2008	Nouveau-Né	Humiecki & Graef	Christoph Hornetz	Art of Shaving	IFF
55	2008	Multiple Rouge	Humiecki & Graef		Art of Shaving	IFF
56	2008	Geste	Humiecki & Graef	Christoph Hornetz	Art of Shaving	IFF
57	2008	Eau Radieuse	Humiecki & Graef	Christoph Hornetz	Art of Shaving	IFF
58	2008	Askew	Humiecki & Graef		Art of Shaving	IFF
59	2008	Amanda	Amanda Lepore		Artware Gallery NYC	IFF
60	2009	V de Vakko	Vakko			IFF
61	2009	Polo Blue Club	Ralph Lauren	Carlos Bénaïm, Laurent Bruyère, Pierre Wargnye	L'Oréal USA	IFF
62	2009	Clemency	Humiecki & Graef	Christoph Hornetz	Art of Shaving	IFF
63	2009	Kyoteau, Bottled Memories	Della Chuang			IFF
64	2009	Orchidelirium	Wild Mauritius - Royal Kew Botanical Gardens, London			DreamAir, Firmenich
65	2010	Happy in Bloom 2010	Clinique		Estée Lauder Companies	IFF
66	2010	Eau de Kiki	Kiki Smith		Artware Gallery NYC	DreamAir, Firmenich
67	2010	Bosque	Humiecki & Graef	Christoph Hornetz	Art of Shaving	DreamAir, Firmenich
68	2011	Blask	Humiecki & Graef	Christoph Hornetz	Art of Shaving	DreamAir, Firmenich
69	2012	Passiflora	Nest Fragrances		Nest Fragrances	DreamAir, Firmenich
70	2012	Happy in Bloom 2012	Clinique		Estée Lauder Companies	IFF
71	2012	Candour	Humiecki & Graef	Christoph Hornetz	Art of Shaving	DreamAir, Firmenich
72	2012	Amazon Lily	Nest Fragrances		Nest Fragrances	DreamAir, Firmenich
73	2013	White Sandalwood	Nest Fragrances	Christoph Hornetz	Nest Fragrances	DreamAir, Firmenich
74	2013	Happy in Bloom 2013	Clinique		Estée Lauder Companies	IFF
75	2014	Tulile	Raymonds Matts			DreamAir, Firmenich
76	2014	Pashay	Raymonds Matts			DreamAir, Firmenich
77	2014	Jarro	Raymonds Matts			DreamAir, Firmenich
78	2014	In the Spotlight 11	Azul by Moussy		Baroque Japan Ltd	DreamAir, Firmenich
79	2014	Happy in Bloom 2014	Clinique		Estée Lauder Companies	IFF
80	2014	Dead of Night	Strangelove NYC	Jacques Cavallier-Belletrud	Strangelove NYC	DreamAir, Firmenich
81	2015	Melt My Heart	Strangelove NYC		Strangelove NYC	DreamAir, Firmenich
82	2015	Happy in Bloom 2015	Clinique		Estée Lauder Companies	IFF
83	stillborn 2015	Abîme	Humiecki & Graef	Christoph Hornetz	Art of Shaving	DreamAir, Firmenich
84	stillborn 2015	Nouveau-né	Humiecki & Graef	Christoph Hornetz	Art of Shaving	DreamAir, Firmenich
85	2017	Spacewood	The Zoo NYC		DreamAir	DreamAir, Firmenich
86	2017	Silence the Sea	Strangelove NYC		Strangelove NYC	DreamAir, Firmenich
87	2017	Club Design	The Zoo NYC		DreamAir	DreamAir, Firmenich
88	2017	Scent Tattoo	The Zoo NYC		DreamAir	DreamAir, Firmenich
89	2017	Rhubarb My Love	The Zoo NYC		DreamAir	DreamAir, Firmenich
90	2017	Louis Light	The Zoo NYC		DreamAir	DreamAir, Firmenich
91	2017	Louis Dark	The Zoo NYC		DreamAir	DreamAir, Firmenich
92	2016	Happy in Bloom 2016	Clinique		Estée Lauder Companies	IFF
93	2017	Fig My Love	The Zoo NYC		DreamAir	DreamAir, Firmenich
94	2017	Everlasting	The Zoo NYC	Christoph Hornetz	DreamAir	DreamAir, Firmenich
95	2017	Community	IFRA then The Zoo NYC		IFRA then DreamAir	DreamAir, Firmenich
96	2017	Lost in Flowers	Strangelove NYC		Strangelove NYC	DreamAir, Firmenich
97	2017	Happy in Bloom 2017	Clinique		Estée Lauder Companies	IFF
98	2017	Club Design	The Zoo NYC		DreamAir	DreamAir, Firmenich
99	2017	No Perfume	The Zoo NYC		DreamAir	DreamAir, Firmenich
100	2017	Vetyver Rain Skin	The Zoo NYC		DreamAir	DreamAir, Firmenich
101	2018	Sailors	The Zoo NYC	Jean-Claude Ellena	DreamAir	DreamAir, Firmenich
102	2018	Rich Mess Original	Rich Mess		Ryan Richmond	DreamAir, Firmenich
103	2018	Carré Blanc	The Zoo NYC	Andrew Everett	DreamAir	DreamAir, Firmenich
104	2018	Moscow Seasons	The Zoo NYC		DreamAir	DreamAir, Firmenich
105	2018	5 Rue de la Paix	Park Hyatt Paris-Vendôme		La Bottega	DreamAir, Firmenich
106	2019	Tubéreuse Organique	The Zoo NYC	Ugo Charron	DreamAir	DreamAir, IFF
107	2020	Bank and Rock & Roll	Tochka Bank		Aromaco.ru	DreamAir, IFF
108	2020	Saskia	Grandiflora	Ugo Charron	Grandiflora	DreamAir, IFF
109	2020	Rose 1845	Lazarus Douvos		Lazarus Douvos	DreamAir, IFF
110	2020	Smile & Shine	The Zoo NYC		DreamAir	DreamAir, IFF
111	2021	Amber Classico Modern	The Zoo NYC		DreamAir	DreamAir, IFF
112	2022	Dangerous Curves	The Zoo NYC		DreamAir	DreamAir, Mane
113	2022	Striking	Rich Mess		Ryan Richmond	Dreamair, Mane

=== Scent Sculptures, Art Installations and Performances ===
No.	Year	Fragrance(s)	Installation/Performance	Co-Artist(s)	Location(s)	Formula deposited at
	1995-2012	Lilac Mon Amour	Lilac Mon Amour iconosm	Brian Jones	Iconosms solo show, Dillon Gallery, NYC (2013)	
	2003	Expansion #6	Expansion #6 iconosm	Laurent E. Badessi	Maruani & Noirhomme Gallery, Knocke, Belgium Art+ Fine Art Gallery, Miami Iconosms, Living with Art Gallery, NYC (2005)	
	2003	Twirl #5	Twirl #5 iconosm	Laurent E. Badessi	Art+ Fine Art Gallery, Miami Art Basel, Miami Iconosms, Living with Art Gallery, NYC (2005) New York International Photographic Art Exposition (2006)	
	2003-2004	Success	Visionaire magazine and IFF exhibit	David Bowie, Iman	Visionaire, Trump Tower (2005), HBA-Javitts Center; New York, Paris, São Paulo, London	
	2003-2004	Mother	Visionaire magazine and IFF exhibit	Kate Moss	Visionaire, Trump Tower, HBA-Javitts Center; New York, Paris, São Paulo, London	
	2003-2004	Heat	Visionaire magazine and IFF exhibit	Philip-Lorca diCorcia	Visionaire, Trump Tower, HBA-Javitts Center; New York, Paris, São Paulo, London	
	2004	Voila Sex!	Anatomically Correct installation	Koan Baysa Christoph Hornetz	Broadway Gallery, New York	
	2004	2 scents: New Armani Suit, Old Armani Suit	Marriage installation	Peter de Cupere	Antwerp Fashion Institute, Belgium	
	2004	12 primary scents	Olfactiano scent piano	Peter de Cupere, Sophie Labbé	Brussels, Belgium	
	2005	Milk & Honey, 4 scents	Milk & Honey scent sculpture	Sissel Tolaas, Christoph Hornetz	Bread & Butter Berlin Fashion Fair Bread & Butter Barcelona Fashion Fair	
	2005	4 scents: Hamburg Harbor, Bavarian Prairie, Berlin Club, Black Forest	Nichi-Doku, German Year in Japan scent sculptures	Berlin Fashion School students, Christoph Hornetz	Mori Museum Tower, Tokyo	
	2005	Smashing	Smashing iconosm	Laurent E. Badessi	Iconosms, Living with Art Gallery, NYC	
	2005	Freedom	Freedom iconosm	Laurent E. Badessi	Iconosms, Living with Art Gallery, NYC	
	2005	Dream	Dream iconosm	Laurent E. Badessi	Iconosms, Living with Art Gallery, NYC	
	2005	Flower #3	Flower #3 iconosm	Laurent E. Badessi	Iconosms, Living with Art Gallery, NYC	
	2005	8 fragrances	Nichi-Doku, Germany-Japan scent sculptures and fine fragrances	Berlin Fashion School students, Christoph Hornetz	Designtransfer Gallery, University of the Arts, Berlin	
	2005	Hotel suite of the future, all-scents-design, 4 scents	Five+sensotel scent sculptures and scent capsules	Christoph Hornetz	Zurich, Switzerland (February); Innsbrueck, Austria (September); London, UK (November)	
	2005	Guilty and Orgasm aromas	Visionaire exhibit and luxury set	Marie Wright, Heston Blumenthol	Art Basel, Miami, FL	
	2006	Virgin	The Biggest Power Show performance	Christoph Hornetz	The Power of Scent exhibit, Coalwash Bldg Zollverein, Essen, Germany	
	2006 - 2007	15 fragrances	Global tour of press conferences and exhibitions for the set of 15 artistic fragrance creations on Perfume, the story of a murderer	Thierry Mugler, IFF, Constantin Film, Christoph Hornetz, Pierre Dulas	Global tour, IFF, World Perfumery Congress, LA Fashion Museum	
	2006 - 2011	Virgin N°1	The First Virgin scent sculpture	Christoph Hornetz	Perfume, the story of a murderer show, Global tour, IFF, World Perfumery Congress, LA Fashion Museum (2006–2007) Over 21 solo exhibit, Dillon Gallery, NYC (2017) The First Scent Supper Menu solo show, Mianki Gallery, Berlin (2018)	
	2007	Orlan Corps, Saint Orlan, Baiser de l'artiste	Baiser de l'artiste fine fragrance collection and scent sculptures	Orlan	Musée d'Art Contemporain de St Etienne Métropole, Saint-Priest-en-Jarez, France Gallerie Lambert, Avignon, France Le Plateau, Paris (2008)	
	2007	Jugendstil, Blanche Colombe #AA	I. Jugendstil, Blanche Colombe #AA, aged 8 years scent parabole		"Five Shades of Berlin," Reconstruction, Mianki Gallery, Berlin (2015)	
	2007	Burlesque	Burlesque scent sculpture and scent parabole		Over 21 solo exhibit, Dillon Gallery, NYC (2017)	
	2007	Elephant in Rut	Elephant in Rut scent parabole		Over 21 solo exhibit, Dillon Gallery, NYC (2017)	
	2008	Glacier	Glacier scent sculpture	Christoph Hornetz	World Economic Forum, Davos, Switzerland	
	2008	Happiness	Happiness scent sculpture		World Economic Forum, Davos, Switzerland	
	2008	Six Continents	Six Continents scent sculpture		World Economic Forum, Davos, Switzerland	
	2008	Artemis	Artemis scent sculpture	Christoph Hornetz	World Economic Forum, Davos, Switzerland	
	2008	Swiss Heights	Swiss Heights scent sculpture	Christoph Hornetz	World Economic Forum, Davos, Switzerland	
	2008	Magnolia & Sage	Magnolia & Sage scent sculpture		World Economic Forum, Davos, Switzerland	
	2008	Lavender Fields	Lavender Fields scent sculpture		World Economic Forum, Davos, Switzerland	
	2008	The Plague	Extinct and Impossible Smells scent sculptures and scent cartridges		Cuchifritos Gallery, New York The Reg Vardy Gallery, Sunderland, UK Book by R. Blackson	
	2008	Hiroshima	Extinct and Impossible Smells scent sculptures and scent cartridges		Cuchifritos Gallery, New York The Reg Vardy Gallery, Sunderland, UK Book by R. Blackson	
	2008	3 fragrances	The World Economic Forum scent sculptures	Christoph Hornetz	Sharm-el-Sheikh, Egypt	
	2008	2 fragrances, Club Design	Fashion Show scent sculptures	Christoph Hornetz	University of the Arts, Berlin	
	2008	Butterfly Air	Butterfly Air iconosm	Laurent E. Badessi	Iconosms solo show, Dillon Gallery, NYC (2013)	
	2008	Muguet Patch	Muguet Patch installation		Iconosms solo show, Dillon Gallery, NYC (2013)	
	2008	True Fake Cocaine	Cocaine scent sculpture, scent parabole and scent square	Christoph Hornetz	Le Jardin d'Addiction scent installation, traveling show, France and Switzerland (2010) Over 21 solo exhibit, Dillon Gallery, NYC (2017) The First Scent Supper Menu solo show, Mianki Gallery, Berlin (2018)	
	2008	Mushroom	Mushroom scent sculpture and scent square		Le Jardin d'Addiction scent installation, traveling show, France and Switzerland (2010) Over 21 solo exhibit, Dillon Gallery, NYC (2017)	
	2008	GHB	GHB scent sculpture and scent square		Le Jardin d'Addiction scent installation, traveling show, France and Switzerland (2010) Over 21 solo exhibit, Dillon Gallery, NYC (2017)	
	2009		The Scent of Discovery	Matthias Kessler	Austria	
	2009	33 scent compositions	Green Aria - A ScentOpera	Stewart Matthew, Nico Muhly, Valgeir Sigurdsson	Guggenheim Museums, New York and Bilbao, Spain	
	2010	10 scents: Tobacco, Whisky, Coffee, Cocaine, Marijuana, Hashish, GHB, Mushrooms, Wine, Opium Den	Le Jardin d'Addiction (The Garden of Addictions) scent installation with glass sculpture and scent player	Marie Pejus, Christophe Berdaguer, Christoph Hornetz	Musée International de la Parfumarie, Grasse, France Musée des Civilisation, Marseilles, France Mudac, Lausanne, Switzerland Citée du vin Bordeaux, France L'Abbaye de Silcane, France	
	2010	Whiskey	Whiskey scent sculpture and scent parabole	Christoph Hornetz	Le Jardin d'Addiction scent installation, traveling show, France and Switzerland (2010) The First Scent Supper Menu solo show, Mianki Gallery, Berlin (2018)	
	2010	Opium Den	Opium Den scent sculpture		Le Jardin d'Addiction scent installation, traveling show, France and Switzerland Dillion Gallery, NYC Opium, Museum der Kulturen Basel, Switzerland (2015–2016)	
	2011		Scent installations for wax figures: Pope Benedict XVI, Julia Roberts, Barack Obama, the torture chamber		Panoptikum Wachsfigurenkabinett, Hamburg, Germany	
	2011	Green and White	Color in White exhibit	Silke Schöner	Dillon Gallery, NYC	
	2011	Burlesque	After-Dinner Show - Burlesque scent sculpture and scent parabole	Christoph Hornetz	The First Scent Supper Menu solo show, Mianki Gallery, Berlin (2018)	
	2011	Burlesque 50i	II. Burlesque 50i, aged 3 years scent parabole		"Five Shades of Berlin," Reconstruction, Mianki Gallery, Berlin (2015)	
	2011	The Book Thief No3 9	The Book Thief No3 9 scent sculpture and scent parabole		The First Scent Supper Menu solo show, Mianki Gallery, Berlin (2018)	
	2011	Secret Grass	Secret Grass scent sculpture and scent parabole	Christoph Hornetz	Over 21 solo exhibit, Dillon Gallery, NYC (2017) The First Scent Supper Menu solo show, Mianki Gallery, Berlin (2018)	
	2011	Louis XIV	Louis XIV scent track		Masquerade Ball, Versailles, France	
	2011	Skeleton & Diamonds 2	Visionnaire skeleton art installation feat. Swarovski crystals		Salone Internazionale del Mobile official show, Milan Italy	
	2012	The Banana and the Monkey	The Banana and Monkey scent sculpture		Phantosima - All About the Smell solo exhibit, Dillon Gallery, NYC	
	2012	The Last Virgin	The Last Virgin scent sculpture		Phantosima - All About the Smell solo exhibit, Dillon Gallery, NYC	
	2012	At Your Own Risk	At Your Own Risk scent sculpture		Phantosima - All About the Smell solo exhibit, Dillon Gallery, NYC	
	2012	Fear	Fear scent sculpture		Phantosima - All About the Smell solo exhibit, Dillon Gallery, NYC	
	2012	The Whip and the Orchid	The Whip and the Orchid scent sculpture		Phantosima - All About the Smell solo exhibit, Dillon Gallery, NYC	
	2012	Fragile	Fragile scent sculpture		Phantosima - All About the Smell solo exhibit, Dillon Gallery, NYC	
	2012	Remembrance of Things Lost	Remembrance of Things Lost scent sculpture		Phantosima - All About the Smell solo exhibit, Dillon Gallery, NYC	
	2012	Colored Grass #4	Colored Grass #4 scent sculpture		Emotions solo show, Mianki Gallery, Berlin (2014)	
	2012	Chelsea Hotel #42	Chelsea Hotel #42 scent parabole	Christoph Hornetz	Reconstruction solo show, Mianki Gallery, Berlin (2015)	
	2012	Glue	Glue scent square		Over 21 solo exhibit, Dillon Gallery, NYC (2017)	
	2013	Volatile Marilyn #5	Volatile Marilyn #5 iconosm	Laurent E. Badessi	Iconosms solo show, Dillon Gallery, NYC	
	2013	Hemingway in 6-Major	Hemingway in 6-Major scent sculpture Hemingway in 6 Notes scent parabole		Iconosms solo show, Dillon Gallery, NYC The First Scent Supper Menu solo show, Mianki Gallery, Berlin (2018)	
	2013	Fuller Helmets	Fuller Helmets 2 scented helmets	Christoph Hornetz	Iconosms solo show, Dillon Gallery, NYC	
	2013	Al Germinal	Arab Spring iconosm		Iconosms solo show, Dillon Gallery, NYC	
	2013	Face Yourself	Face Yourself iconosm	Ultra Violet	Iconosms solo show, Dillon Gallery, NYC	
	2013	Gone With The Wind	Gone With The Wind iconosm (2013) and scent square (2014)	Claudia Kallscheuer (2013), Jakob Kupfer (2014)	Iconosms solo show, Dillon Gallery, NYC Emotions solo show, Mianki Gallery, Berlin (2014)	
	2013	Lilies & Narcissus	Lilies & Narcissus iconosm	Chiho Akama	Iconosms solo show, Dillon Gallery, NYC	
	2013	Leather Kings & Queens	Leather Kings & Queens scent track, scent sculpture, scent parabole and scent square		Fantastical, Dillon Gallery, NYC (2014) Over 21 solo exhibit, Dillon Gallery, NYC (2017) The First Scent Supper Menu solo show, Mianki Gallery, Berlin (2018)	
	2014	Bay Horse No.5	Bay Horse No.5 scent track		Fantastical, Dillon Gallery, NYC	
	2014	Roasted Piglets	Roasted Piglets scent track		Fantastical, Dillon Gallery, NYC	
	2014	Sunbathing Devils	Sunbathing Devils scent track		Fantastical, Dillon Gallery, NYC	
	2014	Feathers & Fur #6	Feathers & Fur #6 scent track		Fantastical, Dillon Gallery, NYC	
	2014	Frog	Frog scent track		Fantastical, Dillon Gallery, NYC	
	2014	Four Seasons Flower	Four Seasons Flower scent square	Jakob Kupfer	Emotions solo show, Mianki Gallery, Berlin	
	2014	Baby #13	Baby #13 scent parabole	Christoph Hornetz	"3 Shades of White," Emotions, Mianki Gallery, Berlin	
	2014	The Last Virgin #14	The Last Virgin #14 scent parabole	Christoph Hornetz	"3 Shades of White," Emotions, Mianki Gallery, Berlin	
	2014	Volatile Marilyn #15	Volatile Marilyn #15 scent parabole		"3 Shades of White," Emotions, Mianki Gallery, Berlin	
	2014	Blue Sky & Sunshine	Blue Sky & Sunshine scent sculpture		Emotions solo show, Mianki Gallery, Berlin	
	2014	Warm #3	Warm #3 scent parabole		Emotions solo show, Mianki Gallery, Berlin	
	2014	Kalt #2	Kalt #2 scent parabole		Emotions solo show, Mianki Gallery, Berlin	
	2014	Linden #16	IV. Linden #16 scent parabole		"Five Shades of Berlin," Reconstruction, Mianki Gallery, Berlin (2015)	
	2014	Spacewood 40SU	V. Spacewood 40SU scent parabole	Christoph Hornetz	"Five Shades of Berlin," Reconstruction, Mianki Gallery, Berlin (2015)	
	2014	Ceci est un musk melon #6	Ceci est un musk melon #6 scent sculpture	Christoph Hornetz	Reconstruction solo show, Mianki Gallery, Berlin (2015)	
	2015		New Narrative Experience		Museum of the Moving Image, NYC Dillon Gallery, NYC Art Miami	
	2015		Memory: Witness of the Unimaginable		Art and Science Gallery, Boston	
	2015	Verloren	III. Verloren scent parabole		"Five Shades of Berlin," Reconstruction, Mianki Gallery, Berlin	
	2015	Real or Not Real TITQ #3	Real or Not Real TITQ #3 scent square installation		Reconstruction solo show, Mianki Gallery, Berlin	
	2015	Feathers and Fur #10	Feathers and Fur #10 scent square installation		Reconstruction solo show, Mianki Gallery, Berlin	
	2015	Face Yourself #A	Face Yourself #A scent parabole		Reconstruction solo show, Mianki Gallery, Berlin	
	2015	Face Yourself #B	Face Yourself #B scent parabole		Reconstruction solo show, Mianki Gallery, Berlin	
	2015	Beyond Opium	Beyond Opium scent sculpture	Christoph Hornetz	Opium, Museum der Kulturen Basel, Switzerland (2015–2016)	
	2015	Toad in Grass	Toad in Grass - Kröte im Grass scent parabole		The First Scent Supper Menu solo show, Mianki Gallery, Berlin (2018)	
	2016	1111111111111111XXX #3	1111111111111111XXX #3 scent sculpture		Mianki Gallery, Berlin	
	2017	Real Green Fairy in Chelsea (Green Fairy - Grüne Fee)	Cocktail - Real Green Fairy in Chelsea scent sculpture and scent parabole	Ugo Charron	Over 21 solo exhibit, Dillon Gallery, NYC The First Scent Supper Menu solo show, Mianki Gallery, Berlin (2018)	
	2017	Sweat or Sex?	Sweat or Sex? scent parabole		Over 21 solo exhibit, Dillon Gallery, NYC The First Scent Supper Menu solo show, Mianki Gallery, Berlin (2018)	
	2017	We Were All Once Liquid (Sperm and Egg)	We Were All Once Liquid (Sperm and Egg)		Over 21 solo exhibit, Dillon Gallery, NYC	
	2017	The Whip and the Orchid No.9	The Whip and the Orchid No.9 scent parabole		The First Scent Supper Menu solo show, Mianki Gallery, Berlin (2018)	
	2018	The Apple and The Horse	Flipbook for the Nose installation	Dmitry Rindberg, Ugo Charron, Tanya Tabachnik, Stuart Firestein	Mianki Gallery, Berlin	
	2018	Community	Flipbook for the Nose installation	Ugo Charron, Dmitry Rindberg, Tanya Tabachnik, Stuart Firestein	Mianki Gallery, Berlin	
	2018	5 scent set	Social Media N01 scent player and exhibit	Grasse Jasmine extinct production LMR(R), Bergamot Essence Capua(R)	Mianki Gallery, Berlin	
	2018	Tree of Life No. 72	Tree of Life No. 72 scent sculpture		Mianki Gallery, Berlin (2019)	
	2018	A Pair of Scent Fountains	A Pair of Scent Fountains pneumatic system	Dmitri Rinberg	Mianki Gallery, Berlin (2020)	
	2019	Portrait of a Great Lady: Monique Remy	Portrait of a Great Lady: Monique Remy scent installation and scent square		Mianki Gallery, Berlin	
	2020	12 scents	Scent Chandelier		Mianki Gallery, Berlin	
	2020	New York 2020	New York 2020 scent parabole		Mianki Gallery, Berlin	
	2021	Black and White Mambo N°5	Scent Paraboles: Black and White Mambo N°5		Olfactory Art Keller, New York	

== Awards ==
=== Perfumery Awards ===
No.	Year	Organization	Award	Fragrance
1	2003	Cosmetic Executive Women (CEW)	Home Fragrance Award	Black Elton John Candle
2	2003	The Fragrance Foundation FiFi Awards, USA	Men's Prestige Fragrance of the Year	Polo Blue for Men
3	2003	American Society of Perfumers	ASP Perfumers Choice Award (1 personal award, 2 nominations)	
4	2004	The Fragrance Foundation FiFi Awards, Spain	Prestige Men's Fragrance	Polo Blue for Men
5	2004	The Fragrance Foundation FiFi Awards, USA	Interior Scent Collection of the Year	Elton Rocks by Elton John
6	2005	Fashion Group International, Inc.	Rising Star Award Nominee	
7	2006	The Fragrance Foundation FiFi Awards, USA	Bath & Body Line of the Year	Island Michael Kors
8	2007	The Fragrance Foundation FiFi Awards, UK	Special Award for "Education and Innovation" for the Perfumes of Perfume	
9	2007	Duftstars, Germany	Nominee Exclusiv Damen	Youth Dew Amber Nude, Tom Ford
10	2007	Dufstars, Germany	Nominee Prestige Damen	Burberry London for Women
11	2008	The Fragrance Foundation FiFi Awards, Canada	Basenotes.net & Canadian Fragrance Awards: Best Media Editorial Award to Marian Bendeth for article on Les Christophs	
12	2010	The Fragrance Foundation FiFi Awards, USA	Technological Innovation of the Year Nominee	Scent Organ for the Guggenheim
13	2012	Art Miami	Senior Curator's Choice	Air Sculpture® installations Fear, Volatile Marylin, and The Whip and the Orchid
14	2014	The Fragrance Foundation FiFi Awards, USA	Finalist	White Sandalwood by Nest Fragrances
15	2015	Colognoisseur	Perfumer of the Year	
16	2015	The Art and Olfaction Awards	Independent Category Award Finalist, Fine Fragrance	Pashay by Raymond Matts
17	2017	The Art and Olfaction Awards	Exceptional Contribution to Scent Culture Award Winner	
18	2018	Perfumed Plume Award NYC	Digital Media Award Winner with Keap Brooklyn for "Fragrance Transparency: The incredible artistry behind the creation of a fragrance"	
19	2018	Perfumed Plume Award NYC	Digital Media Award Finalist with Keap Brooklyn for "Fragrance Transparency: Natural vs. Synthetics"	
20	2018	The Art and Olfaction Awards	Artisan Category Award Winner	Club Design by The Zoo
21	2018	ÇaFleureBon	Best Scent You Have Never Heard Of 2018 Winner	Spacewood by The Zoo
22	2018	Perfumes - The Guide by Tanja Sanchez and Luca Turin	2018 star system	Club Design, The Zoo 5-stars Community, The Zoo Rehubarb My Love, The Zoo Everlasting, The Zoo 4-stars
23	2019	The Art and Olfaction Awards	Independent Category Award Winner 2019	Rich Mess
24	2019	The Art and Olfaction Awards	Artisan Category Finalist	Carré Blanc
25	2022	The Art and Olfaction Awards	Independent Category Award Winner 2022	Saskia by Grandiflora
26	2022	ÇaFleureBon	Best Scent Winner	Saskia by Grandiflora

=== Scientific Awards ===
No.	Date	Organization	Award
1	1986	Centre National de la Recherche Scientifique	Special National CNRS Award
2	1986	Médaille de la Ville Chermont-Ferrand, France	City Medal
3	1986	Médaille du Département du Puy-de-Dôme	General Council Medal
4	1986	Chemistry Olympiads, Paris	France National Winner
5	1988	International Chemistry Olympiad, Finland	Bronze Medal
6	1991	Procter & Gamble	National Fellowship Winner
7	1999	Procter & Gamble	R&D Special Recognition Award and Senior Perfumer

== Publications ==
- Laudamiel, C. (2007). Creative Processes in Perfumery. In F. Berthoud, F. Ghozland, & S. d'Auber (Eds.), Stakes & professions in perfumery (pp. 97–103). Toulouse, France: Editions d'Assalit.
- Laudamiel, C. (2009). Haute Perfumery and Haute Cuisine. In H. Blumenthal, The Fat Duck cookbook (pp. 478–482). London: Bloomsbury.
- Laudamiel, C., Hornetz, C., Braja, M., & Patel, S. (2008). From Virgin Education to Real Education. In P. Kraft & Royal Society of Chemistry (Great Britain); Society of Chemical Industry (Great Britain) (Eds.), Current topics in flavor and fragrance research (pp. 329–339). Weinheim; Chichester: Wiley-VCH.
- Laudamiel, C., Hornetz, C., Mookherjee, B. D., & Patel, S. (2008). From Virgin Education to Real Education. Chemistry & Biodiversity, 5(6), 1159–1169.
- Laudamiel, C. (2010). Perfumery – The Wizardy of Volatile Molecules. In A. Herrmann (Ed.), The Chemistry and Biology of Volatiles (pp. 291–305). Chichester: Wiley.
- Laudamiel, C. (2016). Liberté, Égalité, Fragrancité: a fragrance manifesto. https://d3ciwvs59ifrt8.cloudfront.net/feef7663-5ef9-49cf-872f-5ca23732cc29/9cbdfb91-27ac-4c56-8500-086d065a7eeb.pdf
- Laudamiel, C., Tracy, S., & Doull, H. (2018). Fragrance Transparency: Natural vs Synthetics. Keap Matchbook Blog. Retrieved from https://www.keapbk.com/blogs/keap/fragrance-transparency-natural-vs-synthetic-perfumes-candles-scents-scented-better-safer-sustainable [Finalist, Perfumed Plume Award 2018, New York City]
- Laudamiel, C., & Tracy, S. (2018). Fragrance Transparency: The incredible artistry behind the creation of a fragrance. Keap Matchbook Blog. Retrieved from https://www.keapbk.com/blogs/keap/fragrance-transparency-the-incredible-artistry-behind-the-creation-of-a-fragrance-green-market [Winner, Perfumed Plume Award 2018, New York City]
- Parma, Valentina; Ohla, Kathrin; Veldhuizen, Maria G; Niv, Masha Y; Kelly, Christine E; Bakke, Alyssa J; Cooper, Keiland W; Bouysset, Cédric; Pirastu, Nicola; Dibattista, Michele; Kaur, Rishemjit; Liuzza, Marco Tullio; Pepino, Marta Y; Schöpf, Veronika; Pereda-Loth, Veronica; Olsson, Shannon B; Gerkin, Richard C; Rohlfs Domínguez, Paloma; Albayay, Javier; Farruggia, Michael C; Bhutani, Surabhi; Fjaeldstad, Alexander W; Kumar, Ritesh; Menini, Anna; Bensafi, Moustafa; Sandell, Mari; Konstantinidis, Iordanis; Di Pizio, Antonella; Genovese, Federica; Öztürk, Lina; Thomas-Danguin, Thierry; Frasnelli, Johannes; Boesveldt, Sanne; Saatci, Özlem; Saraiva, Luis R; Lin, Cailu; Golebiowski, Jérôme; Hwang, Liang-Dar; Ozdener, Mehmet Hakan; Guàrdia, Maria Dolors; Laudamiel, Christophe; Ritchie, Marina; Havlícek, Jan; Pierron, Denis; Roura, Eugeni; Navarro, Marta; Nolden, Alissa A; Lim, Juyun; Whitcroft, Katherine L; Colquitt, Lauren R; Ferdenzi, Camille; Brindha, Evelyn V; Altundag, Aytug; Macchi, Alberto; Nunez-Parra, Alexia; Patel, Zara M; Fiorucci, Sébastien; Philpott, Carl M; Smith, Barry C; Lundström, Johan N; Mucignat, Carla; Parker, Jane K; van den Brink, Mirjam; Schmuker, Michael; Fischmeister, Florian Ph S; Heinbockel, Thomas; Shields, Vonnie D C; Faraji, Farhoud; Santamaría, Enrique; Fredborg, William E A; Morini, Gabriella; Olofsson, Jonas K; Jalessi, Maryam; Karni, Noam; D'Errico, Anna; Alizadeh, Rafieh; Pellegrino, Robert; Meyer, Pablo; Huart, Caroline; Chen, Ben; Soler, Graciela M; Alwashahi, Mohammed K; Welge-Lüssen, Antje; Freiherr, Jessica; de Groot, Jasper H B; Klein, Hadar; Okamoto, Masako; Singh, Preet Bano; Hsieh, Julien W; Abdulrahman, Olagunju; Dalton, Pamela; Yan, Carol H; Voznessenskaya, Vera V; Chen, Jingguo; Sell, Elizabeth A; Walsh-Messinger, Julie; Archer, Nicholas S; Koyama, Sachiko; Deary, Vincent; Roberts, S Craig; Yanık, Hüseyin; Albayrak, Samet; Nováková, Lenka Martinec; Croijmans, Ilja; Mazal, Patricia Portillo; Moein, Shima T; Margulis, Eitan; Mignot, Coralie; Mariño, Sajidxa; Georgiev, Dejan; Kaushik, Pavan K; Malnic, Bettina; Wang, Hong; Seyed-Allaei, Shima; Yoluk, Nur; Razzaghi-Asl, Sara; Justice, Jeb M; Restrepo, Diego; Reed, Danielle R; Hummel, Thomas; Munger, Steven D; Hayes, John E (2020-06-20). "More Than Smell—COVID-19 Is Associated With Severe Impairment of Smell, Taste, and Chemesthesis". Chemical Senses. 45 (7). Oxford University Press (OUP): 609–622. doi:10.1093/chemse/bjaa041. ISSN 0379-864X. PMC 7337664. PMID 32564071. S2CID 218538840.

- Parma, Valentina; et al. (2021-01-01). "Corrigendum to: More Than Smell—COVID-19 Is Associated With Severe Impairment of Smell, Taste, and Chemesthesis". Chemical Senses. 46 bjab050. Oxford University Press (OUP). doi:10.1093/chemse/bjab050. ISSN 0379-864X. PMC 8689756. PMID 34879393. S2CID 245025840.

- Parma, V., Ohla, K., Veldhuizen, M., ... Laudamiel, C. (adv. access Dec 2020). Recent smell loss is the best predictor of COVID-19: a preregistered, cross-sectional study. Chemical Senses, 2021, Vol 46, 1–12
- Ravia, A., Snitz, K., ... Laudamiel, C.,...Sobel N. (2020) A measure of smell enables the creation of olfactory metamers, Nature 588(7836):118-123.
