= Oswaldo Maciá =

Colombian-British sculptor (b. 1960)

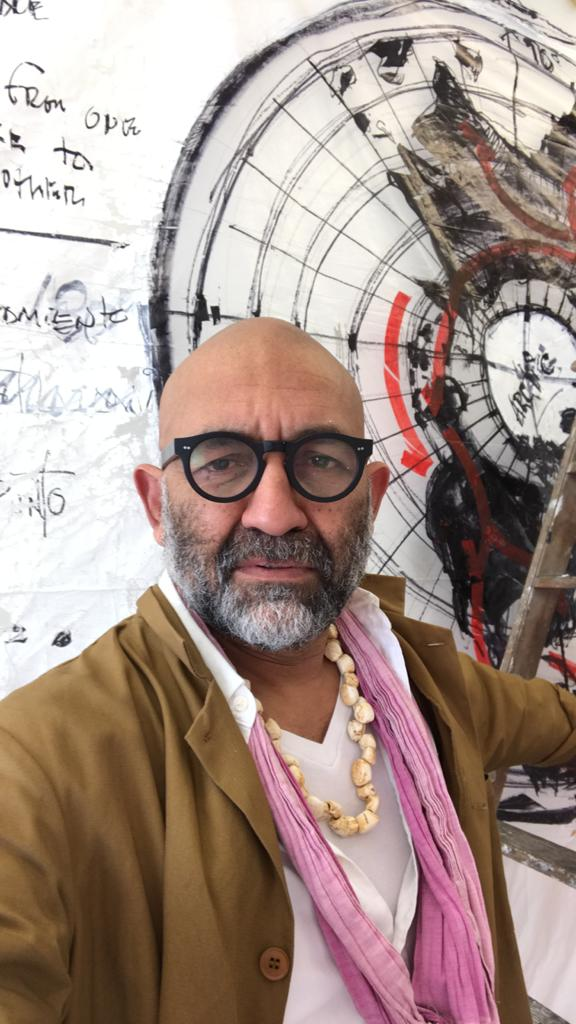
- Oswaldo Maciá in 2021
- Born: 14 September 1960 (age 65); Cartagena, Colombia
- Education: Escuela de Bellas Artes de Cartagena, Llotja School of Art, Guildhall University, Goldsmiths College.
- Known for: Sculpture, Installation Art, Conceptual Art, Sound Art, Smell Art, Olfactory-Acoustic Sculpture, Drawing
- Children: Vicente Maciá-Kjaer
- Website: oswaldomacia.com

Oswaldo Maciá (born 14 September 1960) is a sculptor. Born in Cartagena de Indias, Colombia, he is based in London, UK, Cartagena de Indias, Colombia and New Mexico, USA. Maciá works primarily with sound and smell. In his work he endeavours 'to extend the meaning of sculpture' beyond an ocularcentric understanding of the arts.

He creates olfactory-acoustic sculptures responding to time, place and the ever-changing nature of our planet. Stimulating questions about how we find our place in the world, Maciá's immersive scenarios of sound and smell are held in international art collections and have been exhibited globally, including Whitney Biennial 2026, Tate Britain, Manifesta 9, Venice Biennial, Daros Latinamerica, Riga Biennial, MOCO Montpellier Contemporain, and Porto Alegre Biennial. Maciá won the Golden Pear at the 2018 Art & Olfaction Awards for his experimental work with scent; in 2015 was awarded a public commission for the city of Bogotá, creating the first public sound sculpture in the southern hemisphere; and in 2011 received the prestigious first prize at the 2011 Bienal de Cuenca, Ecuador.

Focusing on migration and cross-pollination, Maciá is currently working on a major site-specific work for the fortified walls of his home city of Cartagena de Indias and on new commissions with Kunsthalle Bremen in Germany and Laznia Centre for Contemporary Art in Gdańsk, Poland.

== Early life and education ==
Maciá grew up in the Caribbean city Cartagena de Indias where in 1976 he attended the School of Fine Arts at the age of 16, graduating in 1980. At the age of 20 he moved to Bogotá. He studied advertising at Jorge Tadeo Lozano University in 1982 and left after five semesters to become a full-time artist. He taught Fine Art at Jorge Tadeo Lozano University from 1985 before moving to Barcelona in 1989. Here he studied for an MA in Mural Painting at The Llotja School of Fine Art.

In 1990 Maciá moved to London. He took a BA in Sculpture between 1990 and 1993 at Guildhall University and then an MA in Fine Art at Goldsmiths College, University of London, graduating in 1994. He continues to live and work in London.

== Work and research ==
Maciá creates olfactory-acoustic sculptures that have been exhibited all over the world. His work is held in international collections, including Tate, and Daros Latinamerica. His sculptures have been included in numerous large-scale periodic in exhibitions and solo presentations across four continents.

He works with smell, regularly collaborating with a master perfumer to create unique scents in response to his research. The visual elements of his work comprise sculptures, site-responsive installations and working drawings showing the processes of his thinking. Often he uses familiar objects to hold the olfactory component - for example in 'Memory Skip' (1995) an industrial dumpster, in 'Under the Horizon' (2010) a bathtub and in 'Library of Cynicism' (2014) a series of aquaria.

In 2018 Macia presented a new work in the first Riboca Biennial in Riga, Latvia and was nominated by Office for Contemporary Art Norway for an Article Residency in Svalbard.

Maciá seeks in his artworks to stimulate questions: as he states in his manifesto (1994–present).

== Selected key works ==
In 2021 Maciá's sculpture 'Something Going on Above My Head' (1995–9) was presented at Tate Modern, and in 2015 at exhibited at Tate Britain. This sound installation comprises sixteen speakers that play a symphony of two thousand birdcalls from Africa, the Americas, Asia and Europe. For five years the artist collected birdcalls from international ornithological archives and audio libraries. These he reworked into a symphony, scored according to the birds’ pitches. This sculpture has been exhibited at X-Teresa, Mexico D.F. in 1999; Whitechapel Gallery, London in 2000; Event Uppsala, Sweden in 2000; Tirana Biennale, Albania in 2001; Afroamerica, Haiti in 2002; Museo Nacional Centro de Arte Reina Sofía, Madrid in 2003; The Power Plant, Toronto in 2003; Haunch of Venison, London in 2004; at the Daros Collection, Zurich in 2005; and at the 51st Venice Biennale in 2005

At Manifesta 9 in Belgium (2012) Maciá presented 'Martinete' (2011–2012), an olfactory-acoustic sculpture that he began researching for the 2011 Porto Alegre Biennial in Brazil. Located in the tunnel of a disused coalmine, this sculpture is composed of the sounds of five anvils being struck in a repetitive slow rhythm, called martinete. Located at each end of the tunnel was an especially composed smell composition. At the entrance, a 'cucumber' scent evoked freshness and familiarity. At the end of the tunnel a 'metal smell' referred to the anvils, a symbol of the recent industrial past.

Maciá's 'Ten Notes for a Human Symphony’ was first presented at the Thessaloniki Biennale, Greece in 2009. This sculpture consists of ten canvas curtains slowing moving up and down, each one impregnated with a unique scent. For ‘Ten Notes for a Human Symphony’ the artist gathered a lock of human hair that had never been chemically treated from men and women living in Argentina, India, Ireland, Japan, Kenya, Mexico, Peru, Russia, Syria and Tibet. Each lock of hair was analysed in a Paris perfume laboratory using the technique known as ‘headspace’. The result was then analysed and interpreted by a perfumer who created a new smell, or 'note', for each sample.

Maciá's 2004 'Surrounded in Tears' has been exhibited in many museums, including Tate Liverpool (2004) and the Bienal de Cuenca, Ecuador (2011) where he was awarded the first prize for the Bienal. Comprising twenty-two megaphones, each dedicated to a different sound channel, this sculpture is a symphony of one hundred human crying sounds sampled from different cultures and periods. Researching the sounds of tears for two years, the artist consulted recordings and references from a number of collections including ethnographic sound archives across Europe, the Freud Museum in London, the archives of the radio channel Caracol in Colombia, and he gathered the sounds of new born babies from the Royal London Hospital in Whitechapel, London.

In 2000 Maciá was commissioned to make one of the first smell-sculptures ever presented in a museum for the exhibition Continental Shift, A Voyage Between Cultures at Ludwig Forum International Kunst in Aachen, Germany. 'Algae Garden' comprises 150 fragrances of rare flower species, fruits and vegetables from all over the world. In this sculpture Maciá sought to examine contradictions between olfactory and visual information. The installation consists of five rings that rotate once a minute. Thirty tampons, each holding one of the fragrances, hang from each ring.

== Awards ==
Maciá's sound sculpture 'Surrounded in Tears' (2004) was awarded the Primer premio de XI Bienal de Cuenca, Ecuador in 2011.

Maciá won the 2018 Sadakichi Award, a part of the Art and Olfaction Awards organised by the Institute of Art and Olfaction for his sculpture 'Under the Horizon', developed in collaboration with the perfumer Ricardo Moya.

== Public commission ==
In 2015 Maciá won a major public commission for the city of Bogotá selected by an international jury. 'Scenario in Construction' will be the first public sound sculpture in the southern hemisphere.

== Collaborations ==
Collaboration is an important part of Maciá's artistic practice.

Maciá has a long-standing collaboration with Senior Perfumer, Ricardo Moya of International Flavors & Fragrances Inc.

Maciá's 'Trilogy for Three Timbres', commissioned in 2016 by Museo Universitario Arte Contemporáneo Mexico], was created through a collaboration with Dr Fernando Montealegre-Z, Reader (Associate Professor) at the University of Lincoln, School of Life Sciences, Joseph Banks Bioacoustics Laboratories, and the composer Edmar Soria.

In 2010 Maciá worked on the opera 'INXILIO el sendero de las lágrimas' with choreographer Alvaro Restrepo of El Colegio del Cuerpo.

The installation for Maciá's 2004 sculpture 'Surrounded in Tears', commissioned by the Liverpool Biennial, was made in collaboration with the composer Michael Nyman and the designer Jasper Morrison.

Maciá's collaboration with choreographer Rafael Bonachela won the inaugural Place Prize in 2004. The piece incorporated Maciá's eight-channel sound sculpture 'E2 7SD', created with Santiago Posada of StudioAural.
