= Mandy Aftel =

American perfumer

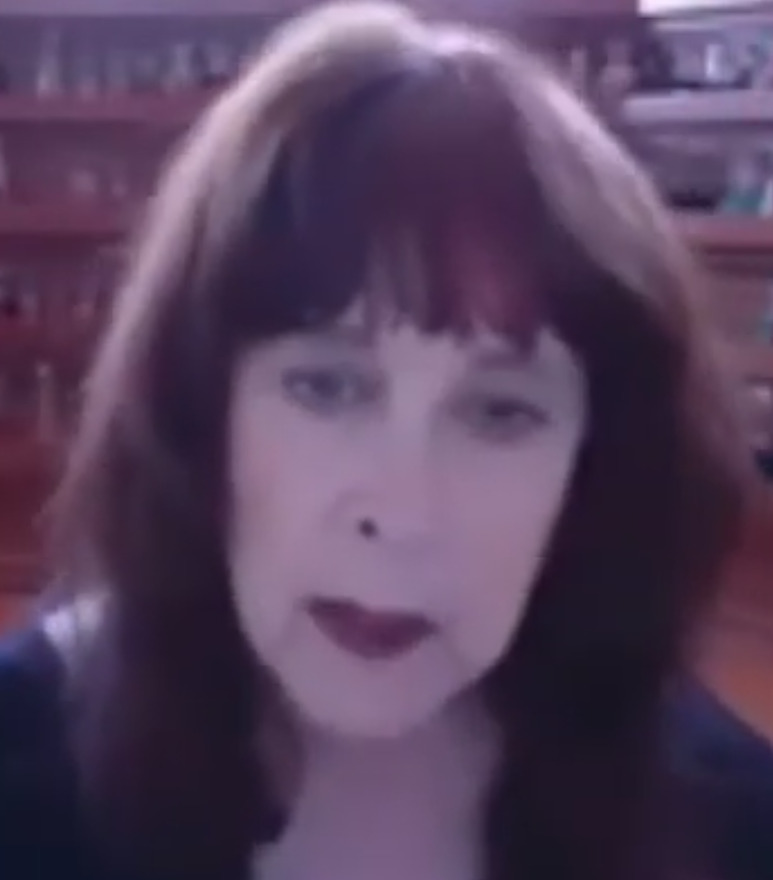
Aftel in 2020

Mandy Aftel (born 1948) is an American perfumer. She is the owner and nose behind the natural perfume line Aftelier as well as the author of nine books, including four books on natural perfume and a cookbook on essential oils.

== Early life ==
Mandy Aftel was born in Detroit and attended the University of Michigan, where she studied English and psychology in college, then earned a master's degree in counseling.

== Career ==
Aftel began her career as a psychotherapist in Berkeley, with a practice focused on artists and writers.

=== Writing ===
Aftel is also an author herself, publishing several books in the 1980s and 1990s including a biography of Brian Jones. She became interested in scent while working on a novel; envisioning her protagonist would be a perfumer, Aftel began collecting rare books on perfume as part of her research, but ultimately wrote a book on the history of perfume instead. The result, Essence and Alchemy, was published in 2001. Publishers Weekly called the book a "most extraordinary treatise on the history and making of perfume" and praised Aftel's "sheer delight" in the material and her "irreverent sensibility."

Essence and Alchemy: A Book of Perfume has been translated into seven languages, won the 2001 Sense of Smell Institute's Richard B. Solomon Award, and has helped pioneer the trend toward using natural ingredients.

Aftel's 2005 book Scents and Sensibilities guides the reader through the history and creation of solid perfume. Fragrant, published in 2014, is organized around five ingredients: cinnamon, frankincense, ambergris, jasmine and mint.

=== Fragrance ===
Aftel's first fragrance line, founded with a partner, was called Grandiflorum; in 2000, Aftel launched her own line, Aftelier. As of 2016, the line offers a range of 18 fragrances, as well as an option for clients to work with Aftel to develop a custom fragrance. In 2016, Vogue named Aftelier's Fig perfume to a list of "10 Natural Perfumes That Are Changing the Fragrance Game" and said Aftelier was one of the brands "giving the Bay Area a new reputation as a beauty capital." Forbes reviewed the Aftelier scent Cacao as "mouthwatering...a marriage of lush and juicy notes." The Guardian described Aftelier fragrance Cepes et Tuberose as "like watching a flower bloom in slow motion. It opens with an overwhelming smell of dampness and earth, and a pink, sweet floral slowly rises up and conquers the darkness." In 2011, the Aftelier scent Honey Blossom was nominated for a FiFi Awards (the perfume industry's equivalent of the Oscars), the first time an independent, all-natural perfume has been nominated for a FiFi since the awards began in 1973.

Aftelier has also been a commercial success, with Aftel reporting in a 2010 interview that her sales had gone up by 25% each year from 2007 to 2010. The line has attracted a high-profile following, including Kate Hudson, Madonna, Liv Tyler, Alice Waters, Lucinda Williams, and Leonard Cohen.

Mandy Aftel was named "best scent" in San Francisco Magazine's "Best of the Bay", included on the "it list" of perfumers in Perfumer and Flavorist magazine, was listed as one of the top seven bespoke perfumers in the world by Forbes Magazine. In 2005, Aftel was invited to participate in a collaborative project between the Rosicrucian Egyptian Museum in San Jose and the Stanford University School of Medicine, recreating a perfume for a two-thousand-year-old child mummy, unofficially dubbed Sherit, from chemically analyzed resins that were scraped from the mummy's burial mask.

Aftel founded the Natural Perfumers Guild in 2002 to increase public awareness and education in natural perfumes.

=== Food ===
In addition to perfumes, the Aftelier line also offers chef's essences, available to retail customers as well as supplied to restaurants including Coi and Atelier Crenn.

In 2004 Aftel co-authored a cookbook called Aroma: The Magic of Essential Oils in Foods and Fragrance with chef Daniel Patterson, focusing on the link between food and fragrance. The New York Times reviewed the cookbook—perhaps "the only current American cookbook featuring recipes for both meals and baths"—saying despite their disparate backgrounds, the two authors "connect in their longing to marry scent and taste."

In 2017, she and Patterson collaborated again to publish The Art of Flavor: Practices and Principles for Creating Delicious Food, offering “rules,” theory, history, and recipes to illustrate concrete principles underlying the intuitive way that “good cooks, like good perfumers, learn to orchestrate ingredients into delicious combinations without thinking about it, let alone talking about it.”

== Bibliography ==
- 1982 Death of a Rolling Stone: The Brian Jones Story. Delilah Books. ISBN 0-933328-37-0
- 1985 When Talk Is Not Cheap (with Robin Lakoff). Warner. ISBN 0-446-51309-1
- 1996 The Story of Your Life: Becoming the Author of Your Experience. Simon & Schuster. ISBN 0-684-81557-5
- 2001 Essence and Alchemy: A Book of Perfume. North Point Press. ISBN 0-86547-553-9
- 2004 Aroma: The Magic of Essential Oils in Foods and Fragrance (with Daniel Patterson). Artisan. ISBN 1-57965-264-6
- 2005 Scents & Sensibilities: Creating Solid Perfumes for Well-Being. Gibbs Smith. ISBN 1-58685-738-X
- 2014 Fragrant: The Secret Life of Scent. Riverhead. ISBN 978-1-59463-141-2
- 2017 The Art of Flavor: Practices and Principles for Creating Delicious Food (with Daniel Patterson). Riverhead. ISBN 978-1-59463-430-7
- 2023 The Museum of Scent: Exploring the Curious & Wondrous World of Fragrance. Abbeville Press. ISBN 978-0-7892-1471-3
