= Annette Green =

American perfume industry lobbyist (1924–2026)

Annette Green

Annette Green (April 26, 1924 – October 8, 2026) was the longtime president of The Fragrance Foundation, an American nonprofit which promoted the perfume industry and culture. She was the creator of Fragrance Week, observed annually since 1980, first in New York City and then nationwide. She also founded The Fragrance Foundation Awards, known as the FiFi's.

The Annette Green Museum, established in 1999 during the 50th anniversary of The Fragrance Foundation, was named after her. In 2000, she was awarded the BeautyWorld Cup Award by the Frankfurt Fair and the German Federation of Perfumery Retailers.

Green retired in 2002, after 41 years leading The Fragrance Foundation. She was a visiting lecturer at the Fashion Institute of Design and Merchandising in California and was on their advisory board.
