= Maki Ueda (artist) =

Japanese artist

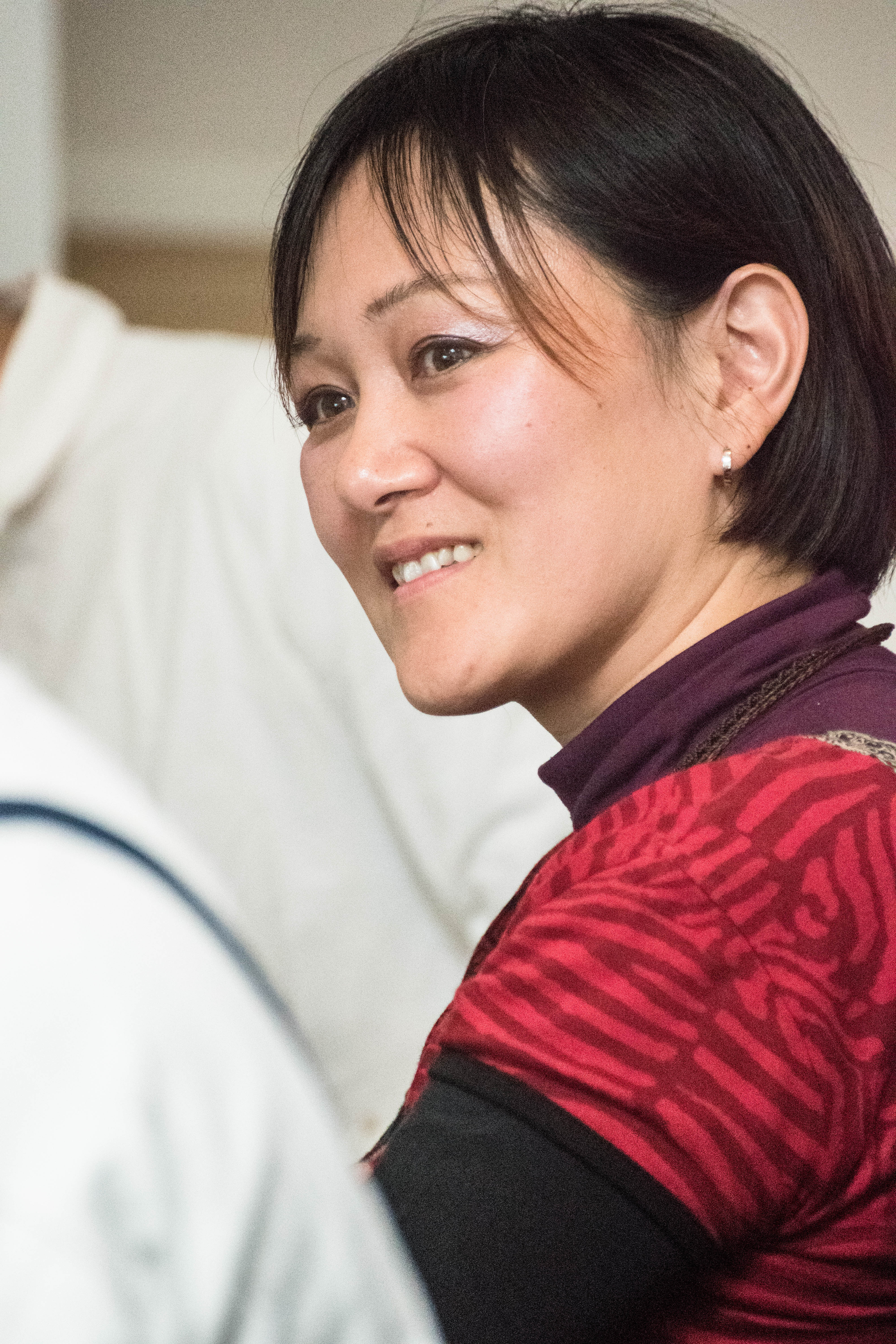
Maki Ueda presenting at the Experimental Scent Summit 2017

Maki Ueda (born 1974, Tokyo) is a Japanese artist. She is currently based in Okinawa and Tokyo, Japan.

== Career ==
Maki Ueda studied media art under Masaki Fujihata at The Environmental Information Department (B.A. 1997, M.A. 1999) at Keio University, Japan.

Ueda is known for her work that focuses attention on fragrance with minimal influence from the other senses, and is considered an important pioneer in the medium of olfactory art.

Her 'Olfactory Labyrinths' series consists of installations that must be navigated by nose alone. Thus the participant must rely on their experience of smell without other sensorial inputs.

Contributing to a show called “If There Ever Was: An Exhibition of Extinct and Impossible Smells,” at the Reg Vardy Gallery in Sunderland, England in 2009, Ueda's piece “ summoned the body odor of political suspects in East Germany, carefully stored in jars by the Stasi in order to track them someday with dogs.”

In 2011, Ueda was invited to be a guest curator for the Palm Top Theater exhibition for V2_, Lab for the Unstable Media in Rotterdam, Netherlands.

Ueda is also known for her work with Kodo, educating people about the practice while teaching about olfactory games with her course Smell and Art at the ArtScience Interfaculty program of the Royal Academy of Art and Royal Conservatoire in the Hague, Netherlands. The course ran between 2009 and 2018. In the Olfactory Games curriculum, she drew from traditional Japanese scent games known as Kōdō, taking their conceptual and abstract approach to the medium of smell to extrapolate other types of game play.

== Awards and recognition ==
Maki Ueda has been nominated for the Art and Olfaction Awards Sadakichi Award for Experimental Work with Scent on multiple occasions. She was nominated for the following works: 'The Juice of War' (2016), 'Olfactory Games' (2018), 'Tangible Scents: Composition of Rose in the Air' (2019), 'Olfactory Labyrinth V. 5: Invisible Footprints' (2020).

Maki Ueda was nominated for The World Technology Awards (Category: Art) in 2019. She received the POLA Arts Foundation grant in 2007.
