= The Fragrance Foundation =

Non-profit organization

The Fragrance Foundation is a trade group representing the interests of the fragrance industry. It sponsors the annual Fragrance Foundation Awards since 1973.

== History ==
The Fragrance Foundation was founded in 1949.

In January 2015, former U.S. President Bill Clinton was the speaker at the inaugural program Fragrance Foundation Talks, where he spoke about the "work with Haitian artisans and the fragrance houses for purchasing vetiver from more than 30,000 earthquake-stricken farmers," among other global issues.

== Governance ==
- Chairman: Jerry Vittoria
- President: Linda G. Levy

== FiFi Awards ==
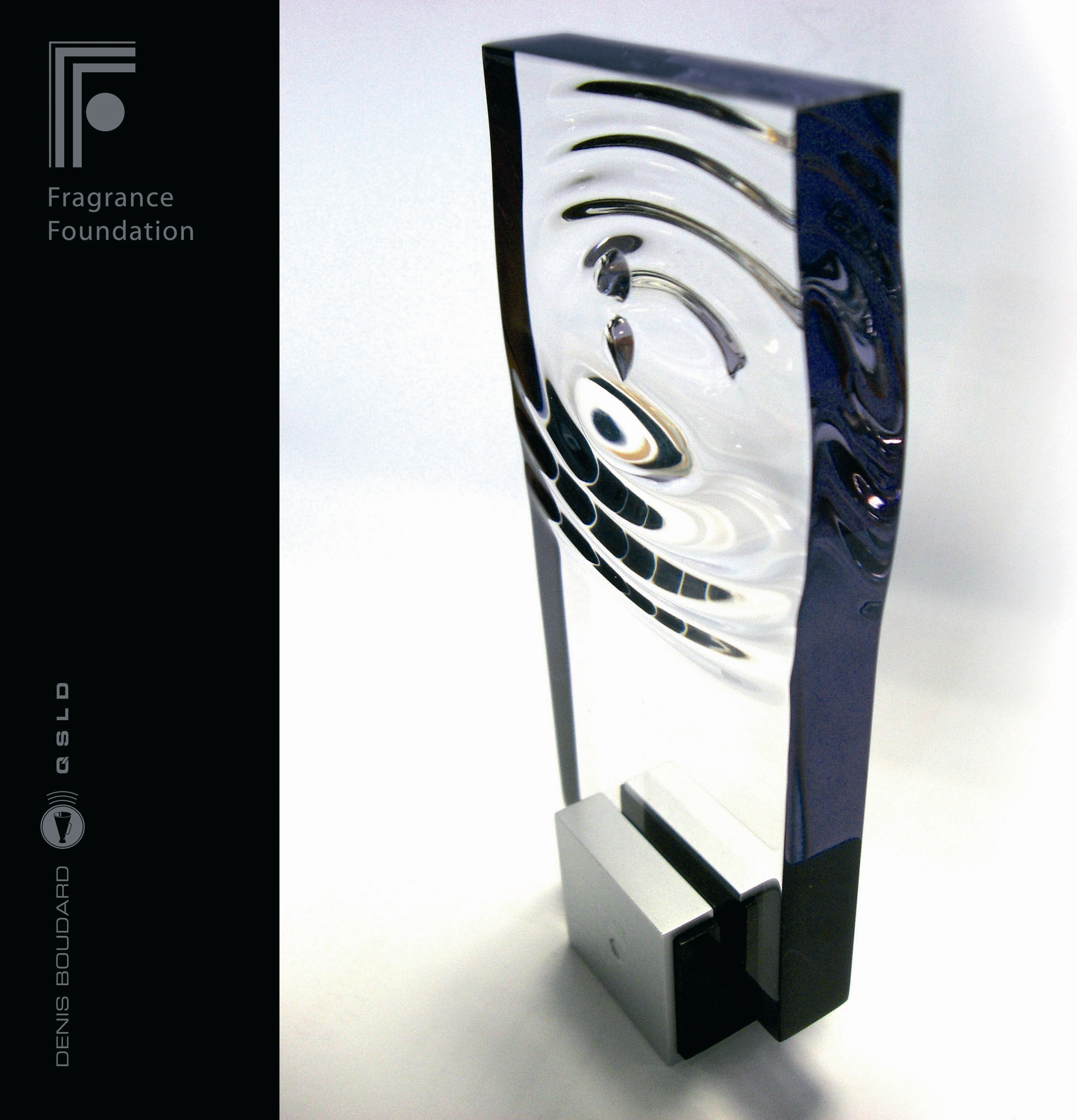
FiFi Award

Known as the "Oscars of the fragrance industry," the Fragrance Foundation Awards (formerly named the FiFi awards) is an annual event. Conceived by former president, Annette Green, the Awards event have been held annually in New York City since 1973 and are attended by around 1,000 people.

Categories include Fragrance of the Year, Best Packaging, Best National Advertising Campaign, Bath & Body Line, Interior Scent Collection, Fragrance Hall of Fame, Editorial Excellence in Fragrance Coverage, Scent Bite, Technological Breakthrough of the Year and Perfumer of the Year, Life Time Achievement.

== National Sense of Smell Day ==
National Sense of Smell Day is an annual event sponsored by the Sense of Smell Institute. It is held on the last Saturday of April at children's museums and science centers across the United States. The day is focused on how the sense of smell plays an important role in daily life and how it interacts with other senses (particularly taste). Typically, museums and science centers celebrating the day will feature hands-on activities and informational displays about the sense of smell.

== National Fragrance Day ==
The Fragrance Foundation launched a Fragrance Day in 2018. The first day was celebrated on March 21, 2018, and numerous brands and retailers held promotions and social media campaigns.
