= The Hot Mikado =

The Hot Mikado may refer to:

- The Hot Mikado (1939 production)
- Hot Mikado, a 1986 musical
