= The Gala Ensemble =

- Origin: United Kingdom
- Genres: Light opera
- Years active: 2008
- Label: Sony BMG
- Members: Sally Johnson, Elinor Moran, Hannah Pedley, Jonathan Prentice, Richard Knight

The Gala Ensemble were a British group of five opera singers formed by Sony BMG in 2008 that recorded an album of selections from the works of Gilbert & Sullivan, such as The Pirates of Penzance, H.M.S. Pinafore and The Mikado.

The ensemble consisted of Sally Johnson (soprano), Elinor Moran (soprano), Hannah Pedley (mezzo-soprano), Jonathan Prentice (baritone) and Richard Knight (tenor). The musical director was Marcus Marriott. The group were assembled by Sony Records, which released their recording, The Best of Gilbert & Sullivan, in 2008.

== Members of the group ==
Sally Johnson was born in Liverpool and grew up in Penrith.

Elinor Moran (born 1980) from Stoke-on-Trent, England, was a student at Chetham's School of Music in Manchester before moving to London to study voice at the Guildhall School of Music and Drama. She was also a member of the touring troupe Mid Wales Opera and a singing coach.

Hannah Pedley was born in Leeds and taught singing at the Royal Ballet School.

Jonathan Prentice from Bournemouth performed as a principal with the Candlelight Opera Company in productions such as Don Giovanni and Rigoletto. Prentice appeared on the recording A Christmas Choral Spectacular.

Richard Knight from Lichfield trained at the Birmingham Conservatoire.

Marcus Marriott was the musical director.

== The Best of Gilbert and Sullivan ==
Sony BMG released the Gala Ensemble's recording, The Best of Gilbert & Sullivan, on 24 November 2008. Several previous compilation recordings by the D'Oyly Carte Opera Company and others have been called The Best of Gilbert and Sullivan, including a Sony Classical Records release in 2000.

The disc has 15 tracks and a running time of 36 minutes. To promote the album the Gala Ensemble performed on The Alan Titchmarsh Show and BBC Breakfast on 12 November 2008.

=== Critical reception ===
Few newspapers reviewed the album. The review in Leicester Mercury concluded, "I don't think this album will attract many G&S converts, and seasoned buffs will probably just dust off their original recordings." The review at the Gilbert and Sullivan Discography said: "This is not an updating of these pieces, it is a bastardisation. This recording deserves outright condemnation ... support for this disc is support for the end of live G and S as we know it. It sets a precedent that electronic falsifications of this music are acceptable.

The album appeared at the launch of The Specialist Classical Chart in the UK for the week commencing 25 January 2009. It became the first No. 1 ranked album on the chart.

=== Track listing ===
- Modern Major General (The Pirates of Penzance)
- Three Little Maids from School Are We (The Mikado)
- Poor Wand'ring One (The Pirates of Penzance)
- A Policeman's Lot Is Not a Happy One (The Pirates of Penzance)
- When I Was a Lad (H.M.S. Pinafore)
- The Sun Whose Rays Are All Ablaze (The Mikado)
- We Sail the Ocean Blue (H.M.S. Pinafore)
- When You Had Left Our Pirate Fold (The Pirates of Penzance)
- Away, Away (The Pirates of Penzance)
- Gentleman of Japan (The Mikado)
- Oh, Is There Not One Maiden Breast (The Pirates of Penzance)
- My Eyes Are Fully Open (Ruddigore)
- Take a Pair of Sparkling Eyes (The Gondoliers)
- Try We Life Long (The Gondoliers)
- Alone and Yet Alive (The Mikado)
