= Patti Boulaye =

British-Nigerian musical artist and actress (born 1954)

Patti Boulaye OBE
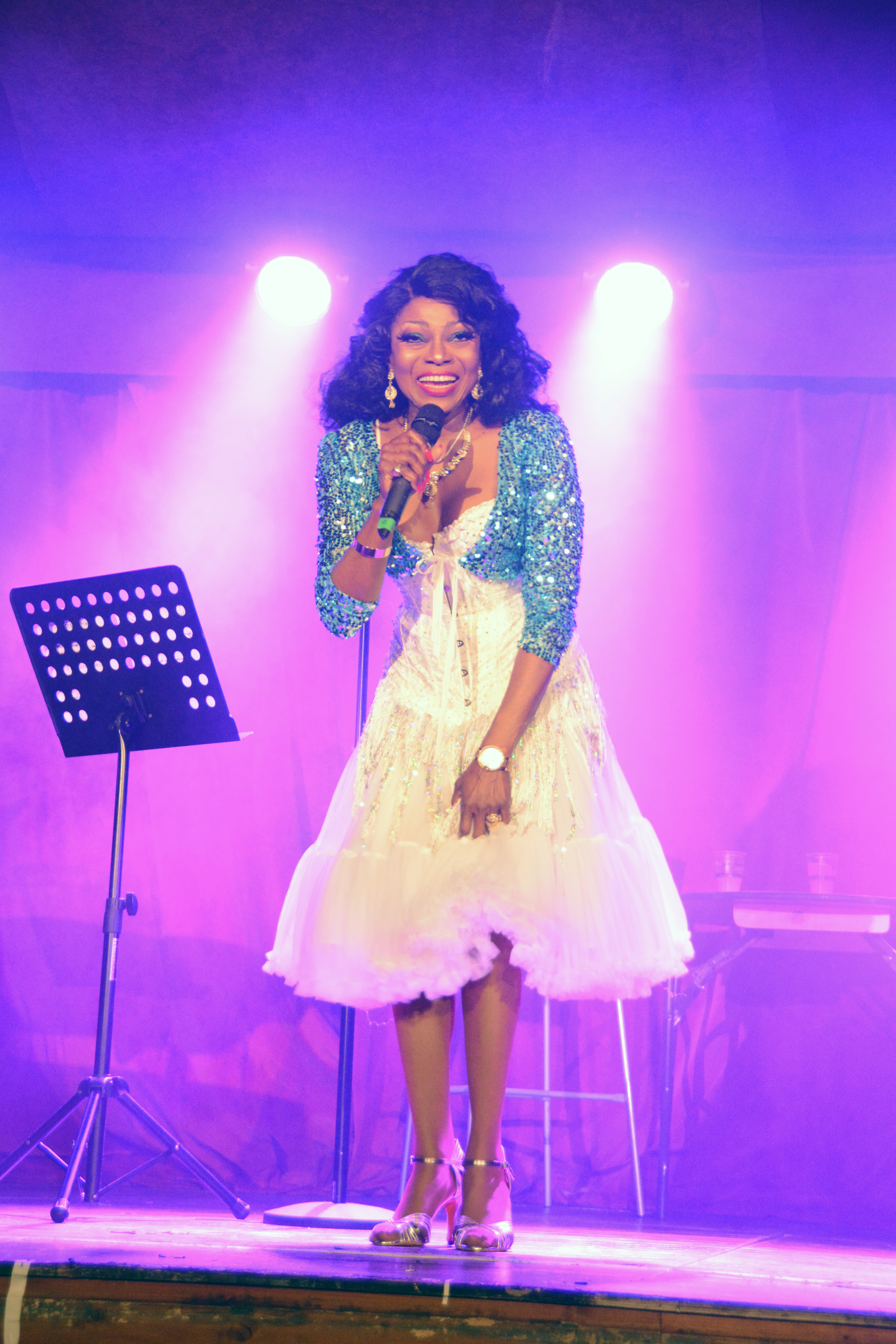
- Boulaye in 2019

Background information
- Born: Patricia Ngozi Ebigwei; 3 May 1954 (age 72); Mid-Western Region, Nigeria
- Genre: Pop
- Occupations: Singer, actress
- Years active: 1970–present
- Label: President
- Spouse: Stephen Komlosy
- Website: pattiboulaye.com

Patricia Ngozi Komlosy OBE (née Ebigwei; born 3 May 1954), known professionally as Patti Boulaye//, is a British-Nigerian singer, actress and artist who rose to prominence after winning New Faces in 1978 and was among the leading black British entertainers in the 1970s and 1980s. In her native Nigeria she is best remembered for starring in Lux commercials and Bisi, Daughter of the River, as well as her own series, The Patti Boulaye Show.

== Early life ==
Boulaye was born after her mother went into labour in a taxi that was passing through two towns in Mid-Western Nigeria. She was raised in a strict Catholic household with nine children, including airline pilot Tony Ebigwei who was killed in the Nigerian Airways plane crash of 1978. She is of Efik and Igbo origin. As a teenager, Boulaye survived the 1967–70 Biafran war and attributes this to her strong faith.

At the age of 16, she left Nigeria for the United Kingdom with aspirations to become a nun. However, during a sightseeing trip in London, Boulaye stood in a queue for what she assumed was Madame Tussauds but turned out to be an audition for the original London production of Hair and soon won a part, which launched her career in musicals. Her father, who did not approve of showbusiness, disowned his daughter but later forgave her.

== Career ==
=== Stage ===
After Hair, she featured in The Two Gentlemen of Verona, but landed her first starring role as Yum Yum in The Black Mikado under her birth name, Patricia Ebigwei. Her stage name is said to have been inspired by the actress Evelyn "Boo" Laye.

Other stage productions she has starred in include the title role in Carmen Jones (at London's Old Vic Theatre, in a production directed by Simon Callow) and Jesus Christ Superstar. In 2003 Boulaye launched her West End musical, Sun Dance. It was written and produced by Boulaye herself and opened at the Hackney Empire. Boulaye featured in an excerpt from the show forming part of the interval act at the 1998 Eurovision Song Contest, staged at the National Indoor Arena in Birmingham. She was appointed Officer of the Most Excellent Order of the British Empire (OBE).

=== Television ===
In 1978, now with several years of experience under her belt, Boulaye appeared on New Faces, where she was the only contestant in the series to be awarded maximum points by the judges, and later won the All Winners Final Gala Show. Boulaye played the part of Charlotte opposite Lenny Henry in The Fosters, Dempsey and Makepeace, and Brothers and Sisters. In 1984, she had her own series, The Patti Boulaye Show, on Channel 4. The Christmas special, which featured Cliff Richard, was a ratings success and an album was released in conjunction with the screening of the series.

Boulaye has made more than 200 TV appearances including Royal Command Performances at the London Palladium. She starred in 12 of BBC TV's annual "Joy to the World" Christmas programmes, produced by Major Sir Michael Parker KCVO CBE at the Royal Albert Hall, with Sir Cliff Richard, Roger Moore and other internationally acclaimed stars. Boulaye has appeared in two episodes of Pointless. She appeared as a contestant in a series of BBC's popular Celebrity MasterChef and later in an episode of BBC One's Money for Nothing, and Channel 5's When Talent Shows Go Horribly Wrong.

In January and February 2016, Boulaye appeared in the three-part BBC series The Real Marigold Hotel, which followed a group of celebrity senior citizens, including Miriam Margolyes and Wayne Sleep, on a journey to India.

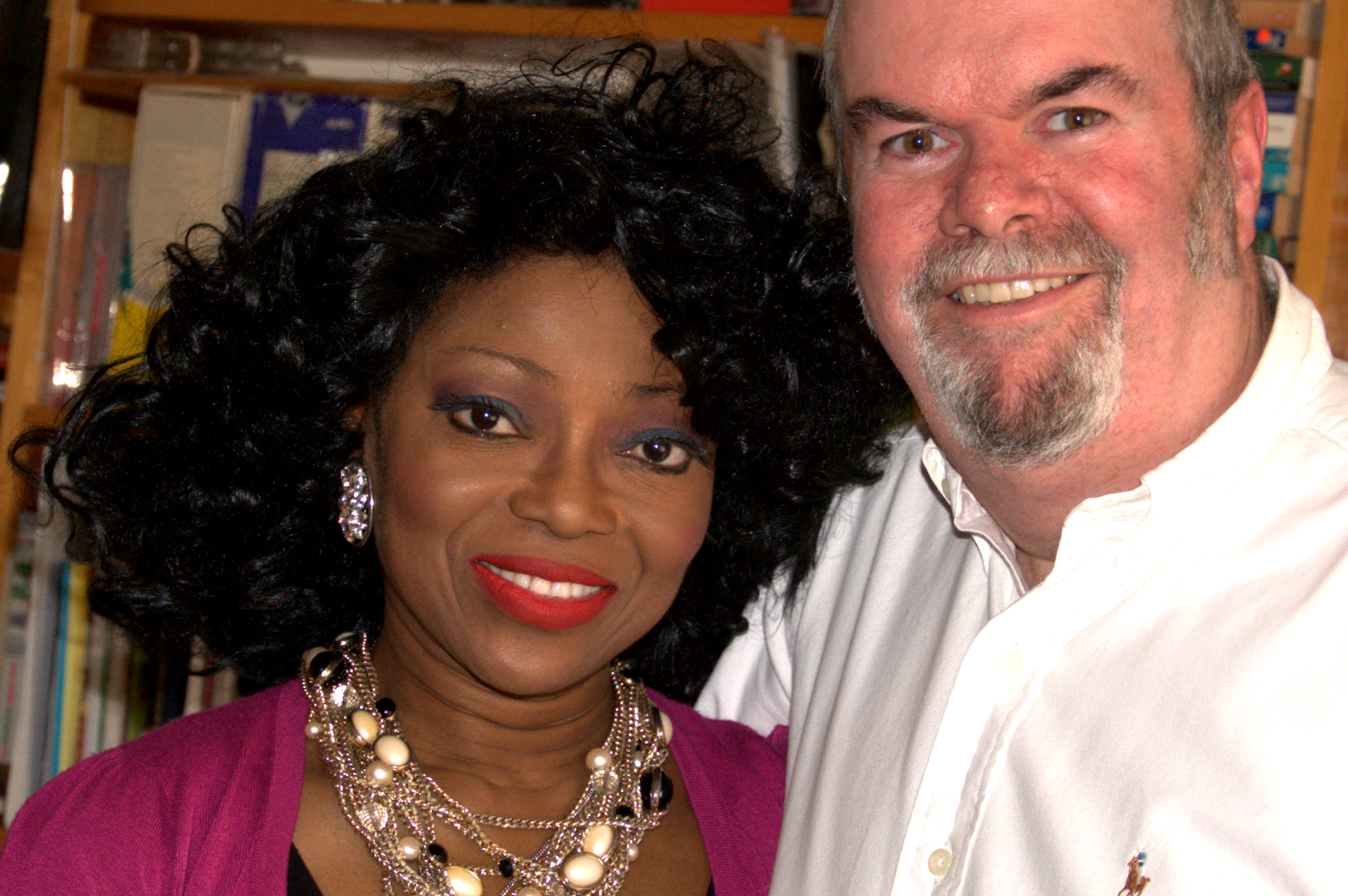
Patti Boulaye with journalist Garry Bushell

In July 2018, Boulaye devised and hosted her TV chat show series "Life with Patti Boulaye", which is recorded and streamed worldwide by Disruptive Live TV. Life with Patti Boulaye is the result of Boulaye's concern about the alarming state of the mental health and suicide rates among young people. Guests on the show are from all walks of life and are encouraged to share some of the challenges they have faced and to explain how they overcame them.

=== Film ===
Boulaye had a starring role in African film Bisi, Daughter of the River (1977), which was said to be the biggest grossing African film ever made, running in the cinemas in Nigeria for three years. She starred in The Music Machine – billed as the British Saturday Night Fever – in 1979, and also appeared as a cabaret singer in the 1980 Helen Mirren film Hussy.

=== Music ===
Boulaye's victory on New Faces led to the release of the 1978 album You Stepped into My Life. Prior to this, she had spent a year touring and releasing several singles with a British-based American girl group.

== Charity ==
Boulaye is the founder and president of the charity "Support for Africa Charity", which has built five clinics in rural Africa and a school with HRH Prince Harry's Charity, "Sentebale", in Lesotho.

== Politics ==
In 1999, Boulaye defended Conservative Jeffrey Archer after he made alleged derogatory comments about black Britons. During a radio interview, he stated: "[Three decades ago], your head did not turn if a black woman passed because they were badly dressed, probably overweight and probably had a lousy job." Boulaye defended Archer, stating: "I am talking as a black woman who knows Jeffrey Archer very well ... and he is not a racist."

In the 2000 London Assembly election, Patti Komlosy was placed 13 on the Conservative Party additional members list, but was too far down to be elected.

== Other work ==
The 1980s saw an increase in fitness awareness and Boulaye was among the celebrities whose voices featured on the Shape Up and Dance keep-fit albums. In Africa, she was the face of Lux for 29 years, The Patti Boulaye Show was shown on several NTA stations, and in 1999 she was invited to sing for Olusegun Obasanjo during his inauguration. In 2002 Boulaye was appointed to the Entertainment Steering Committee for the Golden Jubilee of Queen Elizabeth II, and led 5,000 gospel singers down The Mall in the celebrations singing songs including "Celebrate Good News", written by Boulaye for the occasion.

Boulaye's autobiography, The Faith of a Child, was published in March 2017.

== Libel action ==
In 1999, Boulaye, then a supporter of the Conservative Party, sued The Guardian for libel after the paper wrongly quoted her as saying "This is a time to support apartheid because it's unfashionable"; she later stated she had been set up by a reporter who claimed to have misheard her when she referred to "a party" (the Conservatives) as opposed to "apartheid". The Guardian was later forced to pay £15,000 in damages.

== Personal life ==
A devout Roman Catholic, Boulaye has two children and two grandchildren with husband Stephen Komlosy. Her brother, Tony Ebigwei, died in a plane crash over Nigeria in 1978. Nearly 30 years later, she returned with her British charity to open an HIV clinic in Nigeria.

== Discography ==
- The Sun And I (1975), with the London cast of The Black Mikado
- Patti Boulaye (1976)
- You Stepped into My Life (1978)
- The Music Machine (1979)
- Magic (1981)
- Patti (1983)
- In His Kingdom (2004)
- Patti Boulaye's Sun Dance [album] (2004)
