= The Black Mikado =

1975 musical comedy based on The Mikado

- Album cover
- Music: Arthur Sullivan
- Lyrics: W. S. Gilbert
- Book: Janos Bajtala, George Larnyoh and Eddie Quansah
- Basis: Gilbert and Sullivan's The Mikado
- Productions: 1975 London

The Black Mikado is a musical comedy, based on Gilbert and Sullivan's The Mikado, adapted by Janos Bajtala, George Larnyoh and Eddie Quansah from W. S. Gilbert's original 1885 libretto and Arthur Sullivan's score. The show premiered on 24 April 1975 at the Cambridge Theatre in London, where it ran for 472 performances before going on a national tour. A 1976 production was mounted in Soweto, South Africa, where it played at the Diepkloof Hall. After this, the musical was not revived.

== Production details ==
The plot of The Black Mikado does not stray far from the Gilbert and Sullivan original, except that in the musical the action is set on a Caribbean island rather than in Japan. Sullivan's original score is rearranged into a mixture of rock, reggae, blues and calypso. The West End production was directed by Braham Murray with a nearly all black cast, the exception being veteran actor Michael Denison's Pooh-Bah, who was white and dressed in a white tropical suit and pith helmet. Theatre writer John Bush Jones says that the white Pooh-Bah was portrayed "as a lone scheming westerner, 'condescending' to serve an emerging black nationalist country for his own grafting purposes." The rest of the cast were dressed in what were basically African and Caribbean costumes, "some of which were made to look pseudo-Japanese", and the sets were Japanese. Pooh-Bah is an uptight English colonial official who is contrasted with the sexy, exuberant Caribbean islanders. The Three Little Maids from School arrive dressed in uniforms from their proper English school, including evening gloves and straw boaters. As they sing of their freedom from the ladies seminary, they strip off their modest clothing until they are shown in their native dress.

The cast included Patti Boulaye (under the name Patricia Ebigwei) as Yum-Yum, Floella Benjamin as Pitti-Sing, Michael Denison as Pooh-Bah, Norman Beaton as Nanki-Poo, Derek Griffiths as Ko-Ko, Jenny McGusty as Peep-Bo, Vernon Nesbeth as Pish-Tush, Val Pringle as The Mikado and Anita Tucker as Katisha. Terry Lane wrote, "Norman Beaton was a very handsome young Nanki-Poo and Patricia Ebigwei was a heart-stoppingly beautiful Yum-Yum. The sexual tensions that are implicit in the plot were exploited to the full.... Patricia Ebigwei's version of 'The Sun Whose Rays' [is] the performance against which all others must now be judged ... a slow, erotic, languid ballad of vanity and sexual self-satisfaction that makes the conventional renditions seem prissy".

== Musical numbers ==
The numbers listed in the 1975 recording were as follows. The show had additional musical numbers.

- 1. If you want to know who we are
- 2. A wand'ring minstrel I
- 3. Behold the Lord High Executioner
- 4. Three little maids from school
- 5. So please you Sir we much regret
- 6. The sun whose rays
- 7. Mi-ya-sa-ma mi-ya-sa-ma
- 8. A more humane Mikado
- 9. The criminal cried
- 10. The flowers that bloom
- 11. Tit willow
- 12. Alone and yet alive

== See also ==
- Recordings and discography of The Black Mikado

Earlier adaptations of The Mikado employing Black casts include:

- The Swing Mikado (1938)
- The Hot Mikado (1939)
