= The Swing Mikado =

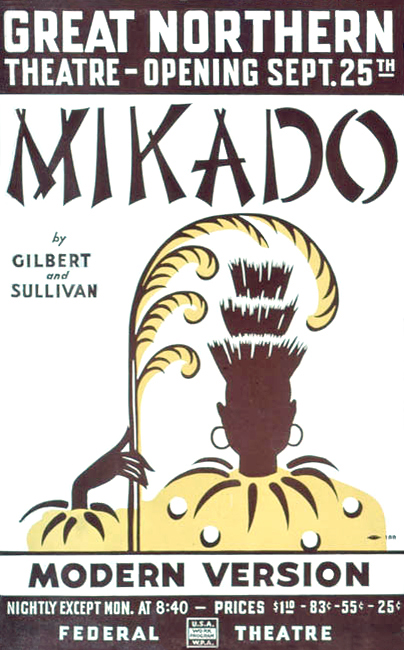
- Poster for the opening of The Swing Mikado on September 25, 1938
- Music: Gentry Warden; Arthur Sullivan
- Lyrics: W. S. Gilbert
- Basis: The Mikado by Gilbert and Sullivan
- Productions: 1938 Chicago, Broadway

The Swing Mikado is a musical theatre adaptation, in two acts, of Gilbert and Sullivan's 1885 comic opera, The Mikado, with music arranged by Gentry Warden. It featured a setting transposed from Japan to a tropical island. The show was first staged by an all-black company in Chicago, Illinois, in 1938. Later that year, it transferred to Broadway. Other changes from the original work included the re-scoring of five of the musical numbers in "swing" style, the insertion of popular dance sequences including The Truck and the Cakewalk, and the rewriting of some of the dialogue in an attempt at black dialect. Other than that, the original dialogue and score of 1885 were used.

== Background and productions ==
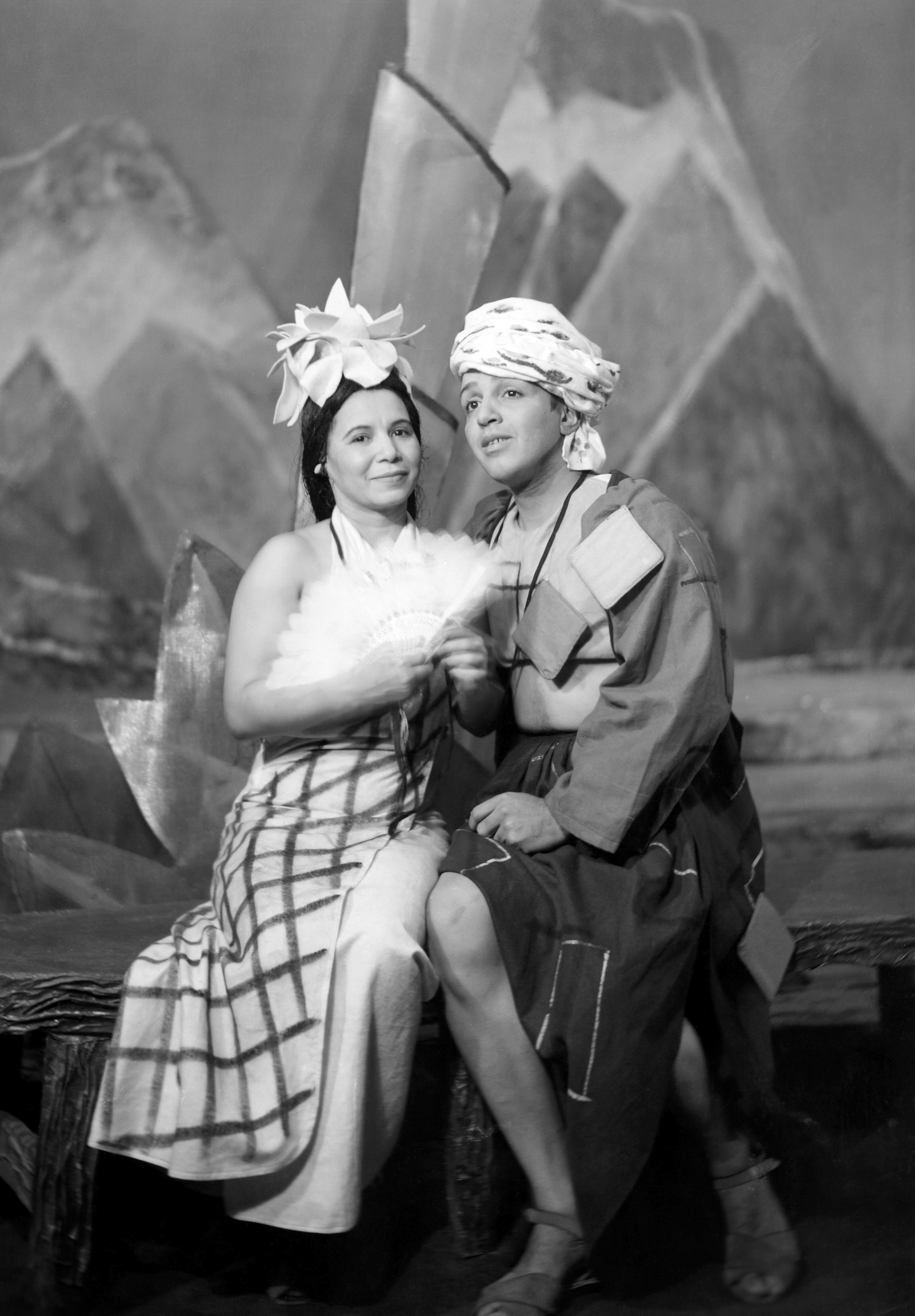
Frankye Brown (Yum-Yum) and Maurice Cooper (Nanki-Poo), Chicago (1938)

The Swing Mikado was a production of the Chicago division of the WPA's Federal Theatre Project. The production was conceived, staged, and directed by Harry Minturn, with swing re-orchestrations of Arthur Sullivan's music by Warden. The starring roles were performed by Maurice Cooper (Nanki-Poo), Frankye Brown (Yum-Yum) and William Franklin (Pooh-Bah).

After a five-month run in Chicago, the production moved to Broadway where it had a run of 86 performances. Its success inspired producer Mike Todd to mount a similar adaptation, The Hot Mikado (1939). There is disagreement over whether or not the production reinforced negative racial stereotypes.

The opening night in New York was attended by Eleanor Roosevelt, Harry Hopkins and Mayor LaGuardia. The New York Times reviewer, Brooks Atkinson, gave it a good, if patronizing, review, praising Cooper as "a Nanki-Poo of superior voice and articulate acting capability" but complaining that the large company of "sepia show-folk" [sic] included "some that only fumble the music." Atkinson wrote that "after a slow start the show goes on a bender, the performers grin and strut and begin stamping out the hot rhythms with an animal frenzy. 'Za-zu-za-zu,' the three little maids from school say huskily, breaking down into a smoking caper. All this is something to see and hear ... the chorus includes some dusky wenches who can dance for the Savoyard jitterbugs with gleaming frenzy, tossing their heads in wild delight ... when [the company] gives The Mikado a Cotton Club finish, they raise the body temperature considerably."

The show was also presented at the 1939 Golden Gate International Exposition in San Francisco, with an all black cast and directed by Elmer Keeton.

== Musical numbers ==
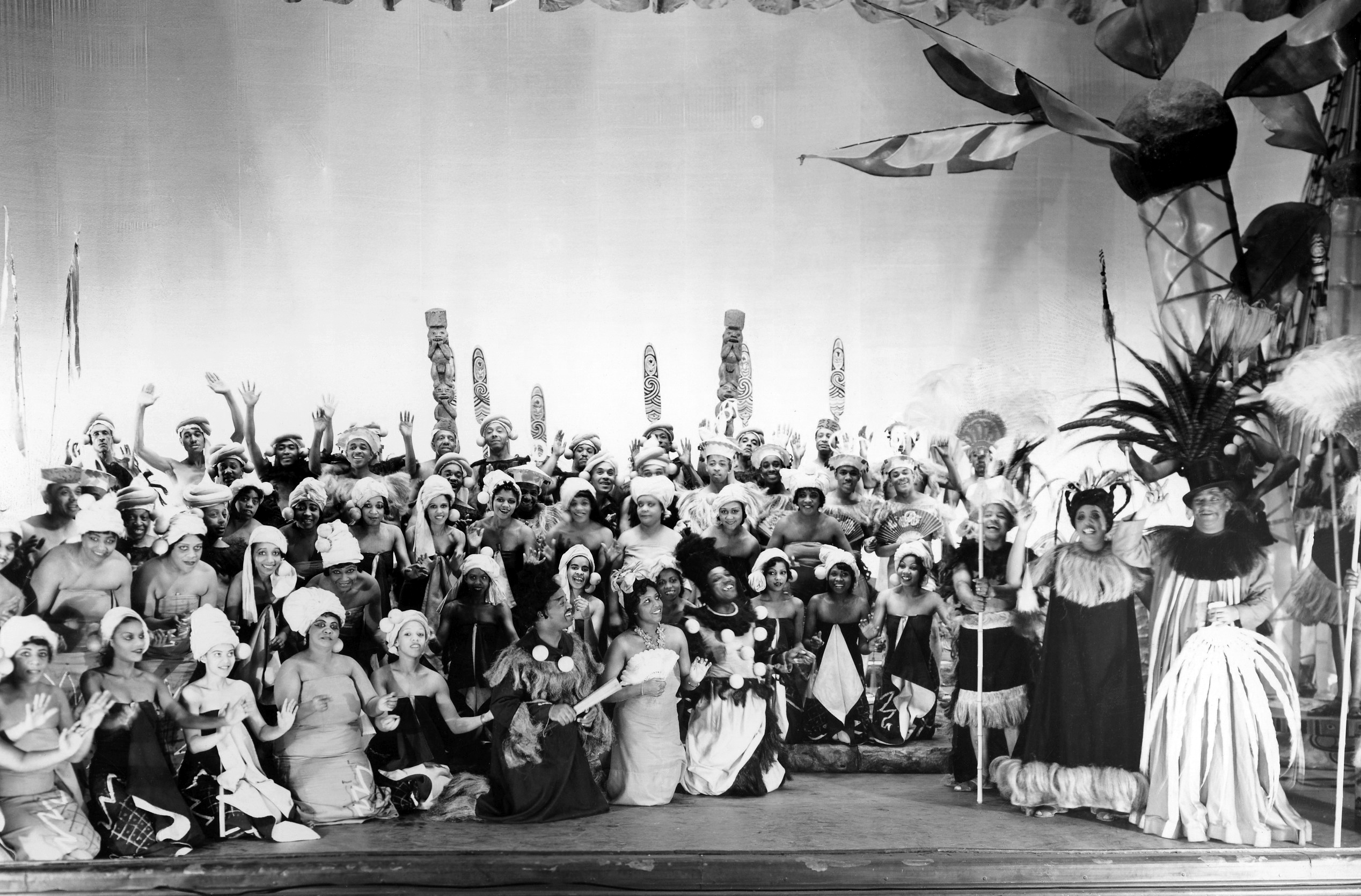
Cast of the original Chicago production (1938)

=== Act 1 ===
- A Wandering Minstrel - Nanki-Poo and Male Chorus
- Our Great Mikado - Pish-Tush and Male Chorus
- Young Man Despair - Pooh-Bah, Pish-Tush and Nanki-Poo
- Behold the Lord High Executioner - Ko-Ko and Male Chorus
- I've Got a Little List - Ko-Ko and Male Chorus
- Three Little Maids from School - Yum-Yum, Pitti-Sing, Peep-Bo and Girls Chorus
- So Pardon Us - Yum-Yum, Pitti-Sing, Peep-Bo, Pooh-Bah, Pish-Tush and Girls Chorus
- Were You Not to Ko-Ko Plighted - Yum-Yum and Nanki-Poo
- I Am So Proud - Ko-Ko, Pooh-Bah and Pish-Tush

=== Act 2 ===
- Braid the Raven Hair - Pitti-Sing and Girls Chorus
- Moon Song (The Moon and I) - Yum-Yum and Quintet
- Madrigal - Yum-Yum, Pitti-Sing, Nanki-Poo and Pish-Tush
- Here's a How-de-do - Yum-Yum, Nanki-Poo and Ko-Ko
- The Mikado - Katisha and The Mikado
- I'm the Emperor of Japan - The Mikado and Chorus
- The Criminal Cried - Ko-Ko, Pitti-Sing and Pooh-Bah
- A Is Happy - The Mikado, Pooh-Bah, Pitti-Sing, Ko-Ko and Katisha
- Flowers That Bloom in the Spring - Pitti-Sing, Ko-Ko, Katisha, Pooh-Bah, Nanki-Poo, Dancers and Quintet
- Titwillow - Ko-Ko
- There Is Beauty in the Bellows of the Blast - Katisha and Ko-Ko

== See also ==
- The Hot Mikado
- The Black Mikado
- African American musical theater
