= Mike Todd =

American film producer (1907–1958)

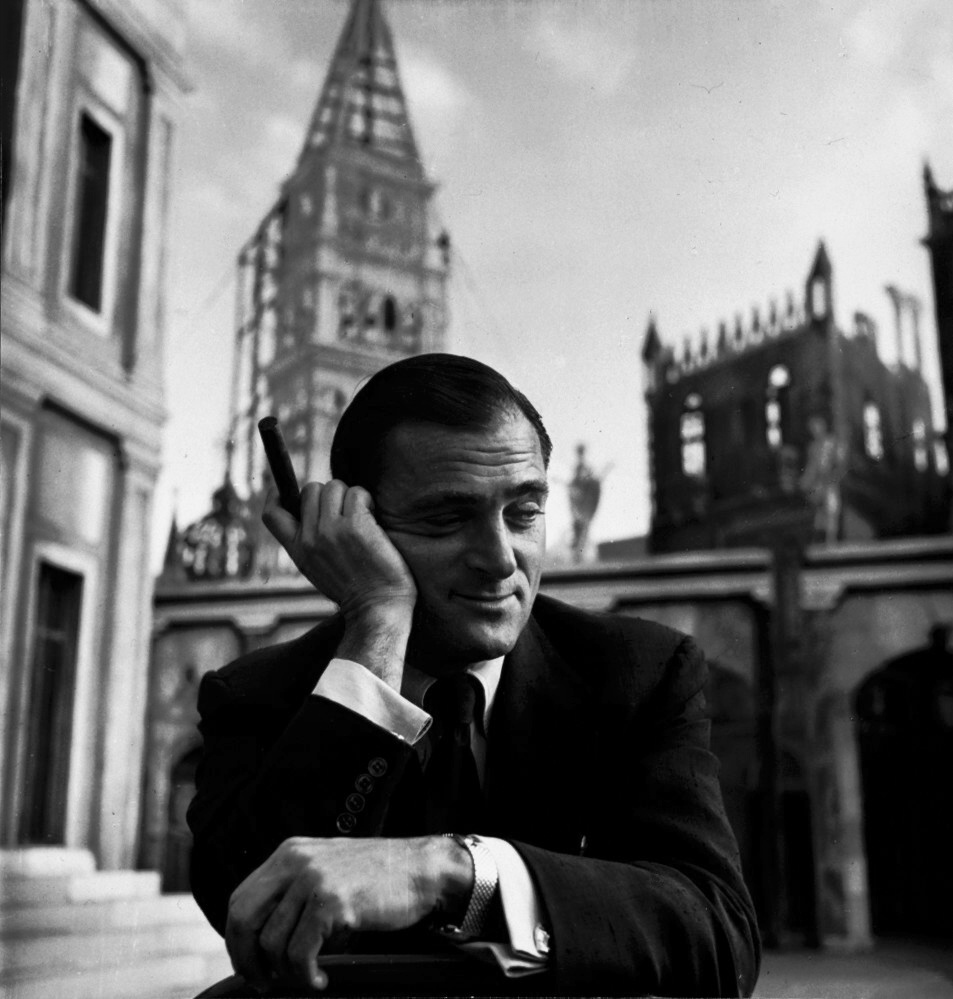
- Todd at the Jones Beach Theater, 1952
- Born: Avrom Hirsch Goldbogen; June 22, 1907; Minneapolis, Minnesota, U.S.
- Died: March 22, 1958 (aged 50); Grants, New Mexico, U.S.
- Resting place: Beth Aaron Cemetery, Forest Park, Illinois
- Occupation: Producer
- Years active: 1933–1958
- Spouses: Bertha Freshman (m. 1927; died 1946) Joan Blondell (m. 1947; div. 1950) Elizabeth Taylor (m. 1957)
- Children: 2

Michael Todd (born Avrom Hirsch Goldbogen; June 22, 1907 – March 22, 1958) was an American theater and film producer, celebrated for his 1956 Around the World in 80 Days, which won an Academy Award for Best Picture. Actress Elizabeth Taylor was his third wife. Todd was the third of Taylor's seven husbands, and the only one Taylor did not divorce. He died in a private plane accident a year after they married. He was the driving force behind the development of the eponymous Todd-AO widescreen film format.

== Early life ==
Todd was born in Minneapolis, Minnesota, to Chaim Goldbogen (an Orthodox rabbi), and Sophia Hellerman, both Polish Jewish immigrants. His year of birth has been reported as 1907, 1908, 1909, and 1911, but 1907 is generally accepted. He was one of nine children in a poor family, the youngest son, and his siblings nicknamed him "Tod" (pronounced "Toat" in German) to mimic his difficulty pronouncing the word "coat". It was from this that his name was derived.

The family moved to Chicago, arriving on the day World War I ended. Todd was expelled in the sixth grade for running a game of craps inside the school. In high school, he produced the school play, The Mikado. As Mike Todd, he produced a jazz version of the musical on Broadway in 1939.

Todd dropped out of high school, and worked as a shoe salesperson and store window decorator. One of his first jobs was as a soda jerk. When the drugstore went out of business, Todd had acquired enough medical knowledge from his work there to be hired at Chicago's Michael Reese Hospital as a type of "security guard" to stop visitors from bringing in food that was not on the patient's diet.

== Career ==
=== Construction ===
Todd began his career in the construction business, where he made, and subsequently lost, a fortune. He opened the College of Bricklaying of America, buying the materials on credit to teach bricklaying. The school was forced to close when the Bricklayers' Union did not view the college as an accepted place of study. Todd and his brother, Frank, next opened their own construction company.

His first flirtation with the film industry was when he served as a contractor to Hollywood studios, soundproofing production stages during the transition from silent pictures to sound. The company he owned with his brother went bankrupt when its financial backing failed in the early days of the Great Depression. Not yet 21, Todd had lost over $1 million (equivalent to about $19,272,908 in today's funds). Todd married the former Bertha Freshman on February 14, 1927, and was the father of an infant son with no home for his family. Todd's subsequent business career was volatile, and failed ventures left him bankrupt many times.

=== Theatrical impresario ===
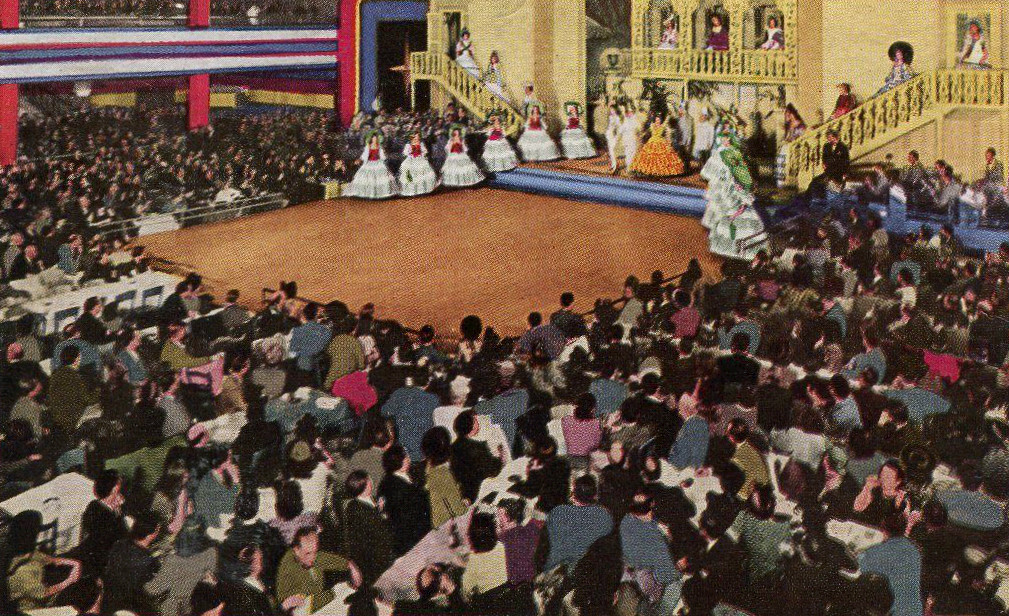
Todd owned a Theatre Cafe in Chicago's Lake View neighborhood in the 1940s that provided dinner with live presentations and music.

During the 1933–1934 Century of Progress Exposition in Chicago, Todd produced an attraction called the "Flame Dance". In this number, gas jets were designed to burn part of a dancer's costume, leaving her naked in appearance. The act attracted enough attention to bring an offer from the Casino de Paree nightclub in New York City. Todd got his first taste of Broadway with the engagement and was determined to find a way to work there.

After seeing the Federal Theatre Project's Chicago run of The Swing Mikado, an adaptation of the Gilbert and Sullivan opera The Mikado with an all-African-American cast conceived by Harry Minturn, Todd decided to do his own version on Broadway, The Hot Mikado, despite protests by the FTP. The Hot Mikado, starring Bill "Bojangles" Robinson, opened on Broadway March 23, 1939. The subsequent success of Todd's production, at the expense of the Chicago production, contributed to the financial crisis and ultimate demise of the Federal Theatre Project unit in Chicago.

Todd's Broadway success gave him the nerve to challenge showman Billy Rose. Todd visited Grover Whalen, president of the 1939 New York World's Fair, with a proposal to bring the Broadway show to the Fair. Whalen, eager to have the show at the fair, covered Todd's Broadway early closing costs. Rose, who had an exclusivity clause in his fair contract, met Todd at Lindy's, where Rose learned his contract covered new forms of entertainment only. To avoid any head-to-head competition, Rose quickly agreed to promote Todd's production along with his own.

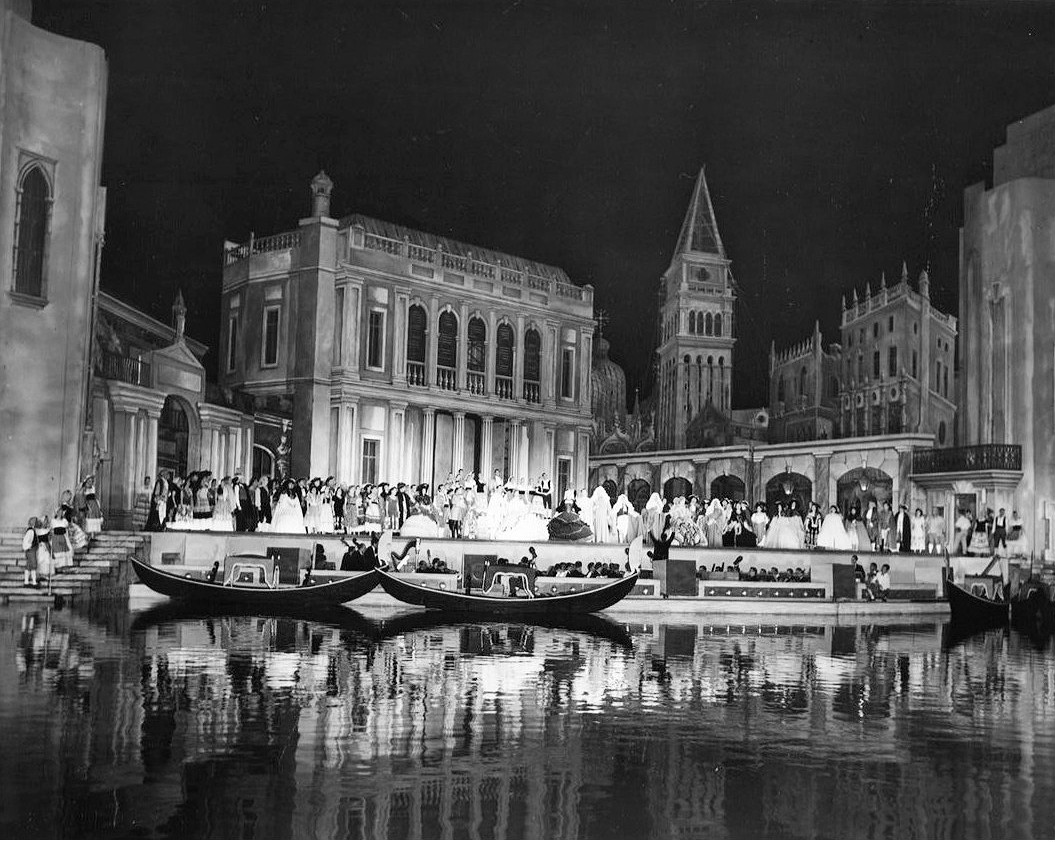
First act finale from A Night in Venice The production was replete with a cast of 500 and fireworks.

Todd ultimately produced 17 Broadway shows during his career, including the immensely successful burlesque revue Star and Garter starring Gypsy Rose Lee and Bobby Clark, The Naked Genius written by Gypsy Rose Lee and starring Joan Blondell, and a 1945 production of Hamlet starring Maurice Evans. His greatest successes were in musical comedy revues, typically featuring actresses in déshabillé, such as As the Girls Go (which also starred Clark) and Michael Todd's Peepshow.

Todd floated the idea of holding the 1945 Major League Baseball All-Star Game in newly liberated Berlin. Although baseball's new commissioner Happy Chandler was reportedly "intrigued" by the idea, it was ultimately dismissed as impractical. The game was finally cancelled due to wartime travel restrictions.

In 1952, Todd made a production of the Johann Strauss II operetta A Night in Venice, complete with floating gondolas at the then-newly constructed Jones Beach Theatre in Long Island, New York. It ran for two seasons.

=== Widescreen cinema and film productions ===
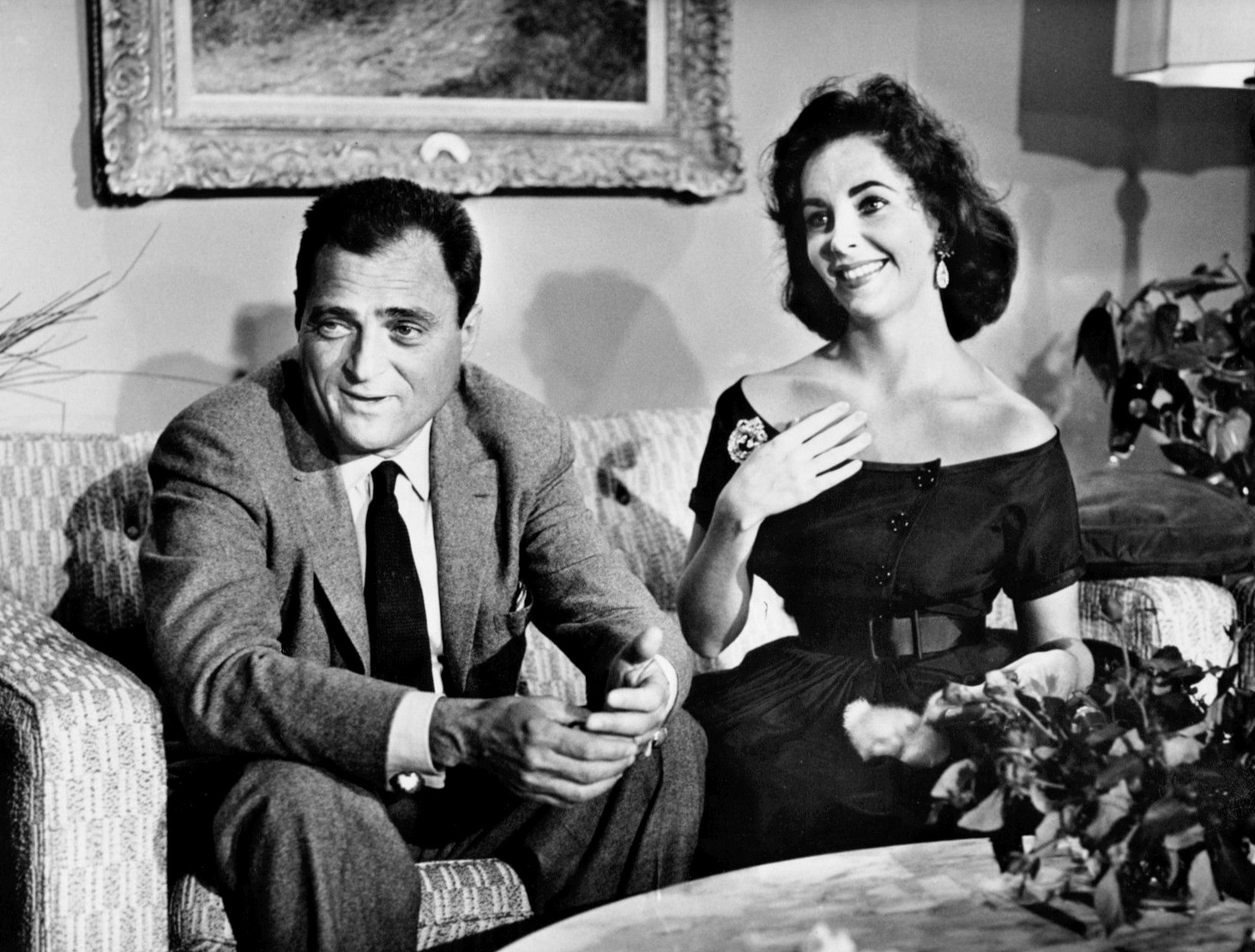
CBS paid Mike Todd for the rights to cover the first anniversary celebration at Madison Square Garden for Around the World in 80 Days as a television special in 1957. Todd and his wife Elizabeth Taylor are seen here at home in a film clip which was used for the special.

In 1950, Mike Todd formed Cinerama with the broadcaster Lowell Thomas (who founded Capital Cities Communications) and the inventor Fred Waller. The company was created to exploit Cinerama, a widescreen film process created by Waller that used three film projectors to create a giant composite image on a curved screen. The first Cinerama feature, This is Cinerama, was released in September 1952.

Before its release, Todd left the Cinerama Company to develop a widescreen process which would eliminate some of Cinerama's flaws. The result was the Todd-AO process, designed by the American Optical Company. The process was first used commercially for the successful film adaptation of Oklahoma! (1955). (Ironically, the producer had famously dismissed the stage musical during tryouts a decade earlier, quipping "No jokes, no legs, no chance.") Todd soon produced the film for which he is best remembered, Michael Todd's Around the World in 80 Days, which debuted in cinemas on October 17, 1956. Costing $6 million to produce (equivalent to $71,000,000 in 2025), the movie had grossed $33 million at the box office by the time of his death. In 1957, Around the World in 80 Days won the Best Picture Academy Award.

In the 1950s Todd acquired the Harris and Selwyn Theaters in downtown Chicago. The Selwyn was renamed Michael Todd's Cinestage and converted into a showcase for Todd-AO productions, while the Harris was renamed the Michael Todd Theatre and operated as a conventional cinema. The facades of both theaters survive as part of the Goodman Theatre complex, although the interiors have been demolished.

A William Woolfolk novel from the early 1960s, entitled My Name Is Morgan, was considered to be loosely based on Todd's life and career.

== Personal life ==
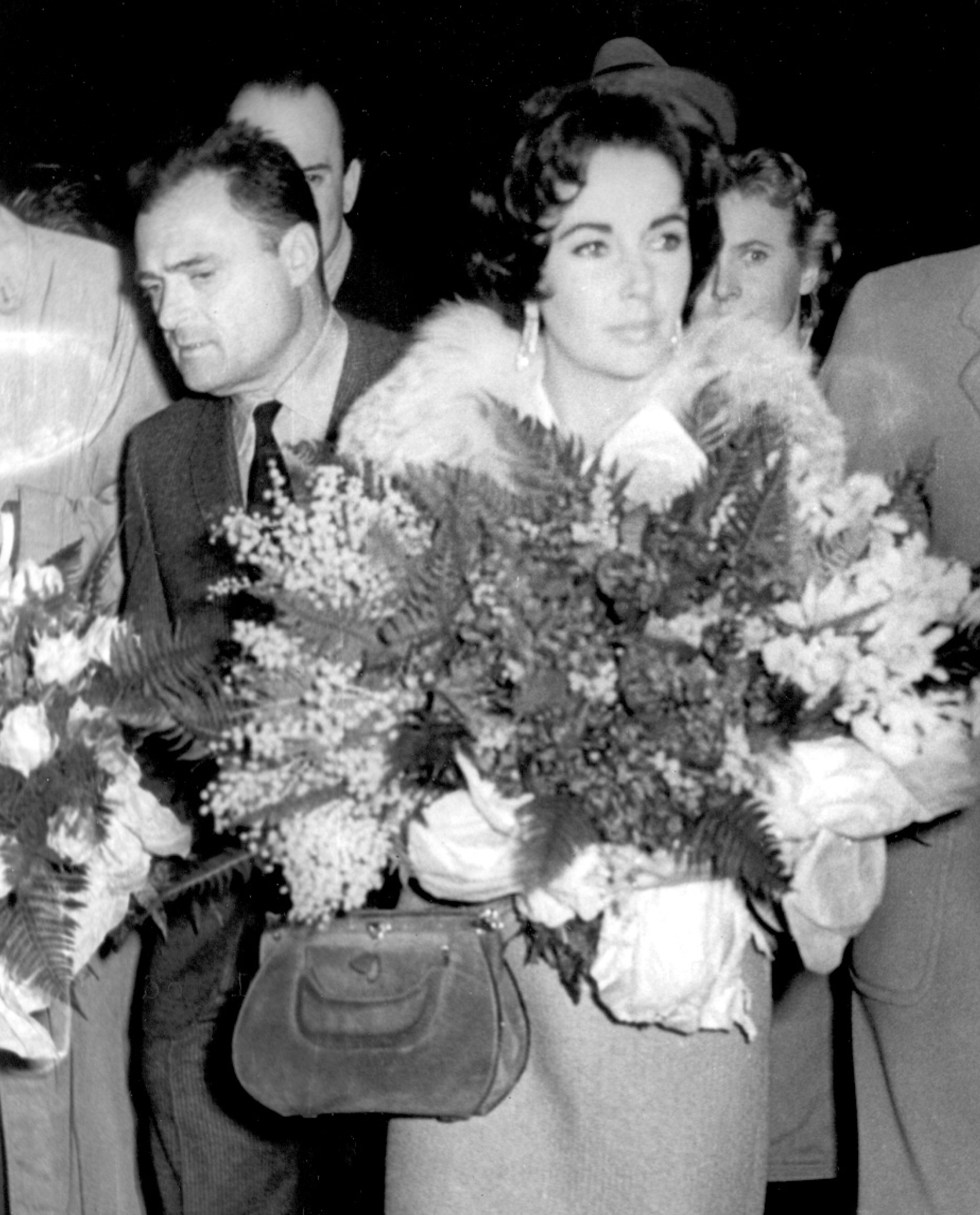
Todd with Elizabeth Taylor in Belgrade

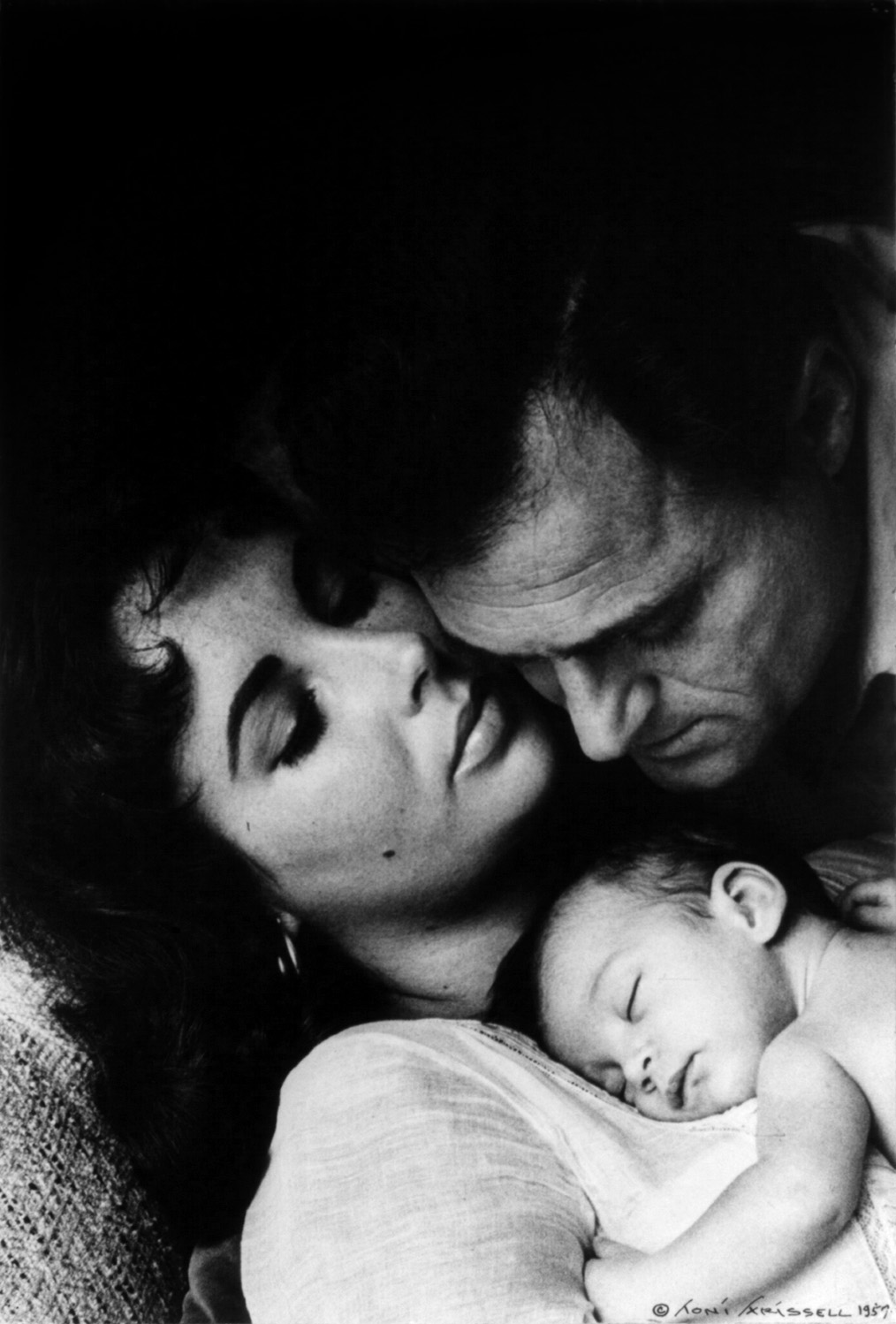
Todd with daughter Liza and wife Elizabeth Taylor, 1957

At age 19, Todd married Bertha Freshman in Crown Point, Indiana, on Valentine's Day 1927. He had been interested in Freshman since his mid-teens, but needed to develop confidence before asking her out. In 1929, the couple's son, Mike Todd Jr., was born. The death of his father in 1931 was a turning point for Todd; he decided to change his name to Mike Todd on the day of his father's death. Bertha died of a pneumothorax (collapsed lung) on August 12, 1946, in Santa Monica, California, while undergoing surgery at St. John's Hospital for a damaged tendon in her finger. Todd and his wife were separated at the time of her death. Less than a week before, he had filed for divorce.

On July 5, 1947, Todd married actress Joan Blondell. They divorced on June 8, 1950, after Blondell filed for divorce on the grounds of mental cruelty.

Todd's third marriage was to the actress Elizabeth Taylor, with whom he had a tempestuous relationship. The couple exchanged vows on February 2, 1957, in Mexico, in a ceremony performed by the mayor of Acapulco. It was the third marriage for both the 24-year-old bride and her 49-year-old groom. Mario Moreno, better known as Cantinflas, was their witness. Todd and Taylor had a daughter, Elizabeth Frances "Liza" Todd, born on August 6, 1957.

== Death ==
On March 22, 1958, Todd's private plane The Liz crashed near Grants, New Mexico, during a flight from Burbank, California, to Tulsa, Oklahoma. The plane, a twin-engine Lockheed Lodestar, suffered an engine failure while being flown overloaded and experienced icing at an altitude too high for only one engine working under the heavy load. The plane went out of control and crashed, killing all four on board. Five days before the crash, Todd flew on this plane to Albuquerque, 78 miles (126 km) east of the crash site, to promote a screening of Michael Todd's Around the World in 80 Days.

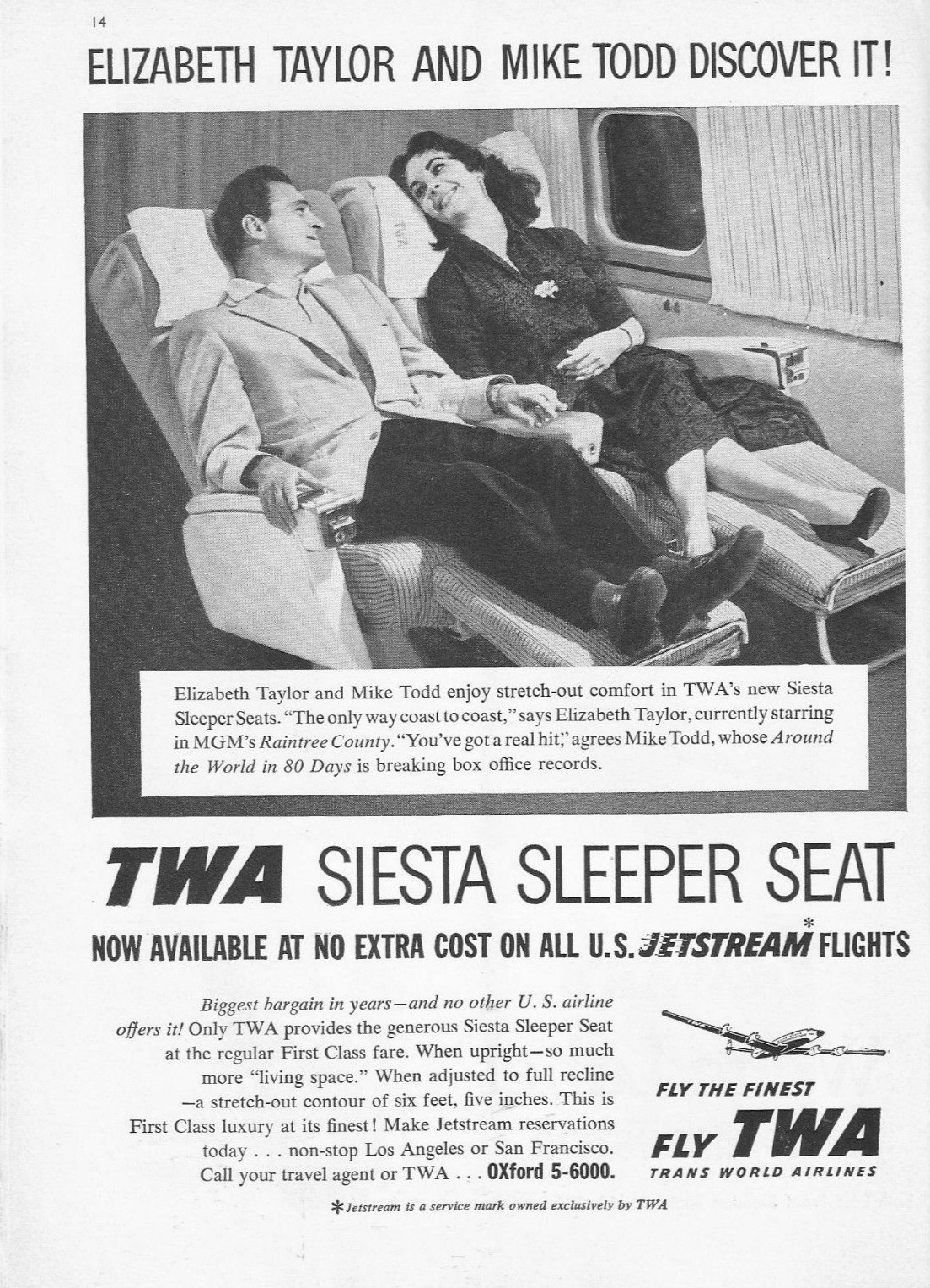
This ad for Trans World Airlines appeared in Playbill on February 10, 1958, about six weeks prior to Todd's fatal plane crash.

In addition to Todd, those who died in the crash were screenwriter and author Art Cohn, who was writing Todd's biography The Nine Lives of Michael Todd, pilot Bill Verner, and co-pilot Tom Barclay, a replacement for the plane's regular co-pilot. Verner was a veteran military pilot who had flown heavily loaded Curtiss C-46 Commando cargo planes over The Hump between India and China. Todd paid for the installation of two extra fuel tanks in his leased Lodestar aircraft; this made it weigh more than its official rating when all the tanks were full. Verner had flown the plane overloaded like this before without incident, including piloting Todd on trips over the Atlantic and around Europe. The tanks had been filled to capacity before the fatal flight.

Todd was on his way to New York to accept the New York Friars Club "Showman of the Year" award. Taylor wanted to go with him, but stayed home with a cold after Todd overruled her pleas to come along. Just hours before the crash, Todd described the plane as safe as he phoned friends, including Joseph Mankiewicz and Kirk Douglas, in an attempt to recruit a gin rummy player for the flight: "Ah, c'mon," he said. "It's a good, safe plane. I wouldn't let it crash. I'm taking along a picture of Elizabeth, and I wouldn't let anything happen to her."

His son, Mike Jr., wanted his father's body to be cremated after identification through dental records and brought to Albuquerque, New Mexico, but Taylor refused, saying he would not want cremation. Todd's mother, aged 89 and a sanitarium patient at the time of her son's death, was not told of the accident as it was felt that the shock would be detrimental to her fragile health. Todd was buried in Forest Park, Illinois, at Beth Aaron Cemetery in plot 66, which is part of Jewish Waldheim Cemetery. In his autobiography, Eddie Fisher, who considered himself Todd's best friend, wrote:

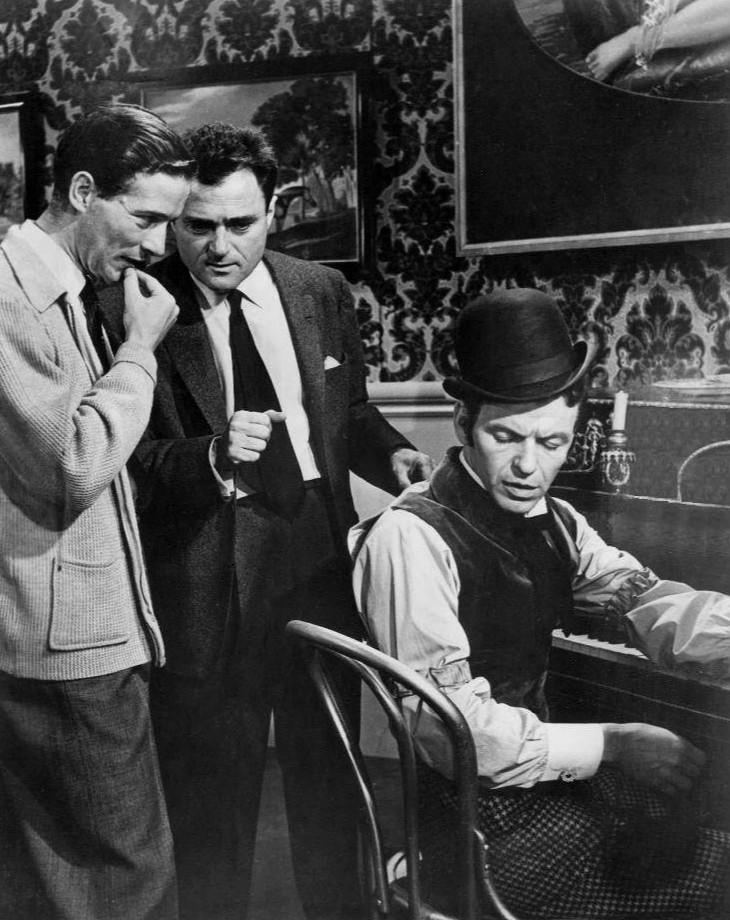
With Frank Sinatra, 1956

There was a closed coffin, but I knew it was more for show than anything else. The plane had exploded on impact, and whatever remains were found couldn't be identified... The only items recovered from the wreckage were Mike's wedding ring and a pair of platinum cuff links I'd given him.

In June 1977, Todd's remains were desecrated by graverobbers. The thieves broke into his casket looking for a $100,000 diamond ring, which, according to rumor, Taylor had placed on Todd's finger before his burial. The bag containing Todd's remains was found under a tree near his burial plot. The bag and casket had been sealed in Albuquerque after Todd's remains were identified following the 1958 crash. Todd's remains were again identified by dental records and reburied in a secret location.

== Selected Broadway productions ==
- Call Me Ziggy (Play, Farce, 1937)
- The Hot Mikado (Musical, Operetta, 1939)
- Something for the Boys (Musical, Comedy, 1943)
- Mexican Hayride (Musical, Comedy,1944)
- Up in Central Park (Musical, Comedy, 1945)
- As the Girls Go (Musical, Comedy, 1948)

== Sources ==
- Dictionary of First Names, ISBN 0-304-36226-3
- City of Light : The Story of Fiber Optics, ISBN 0-19-516255-2
- Cohn, Art. The Nine Lives of Michael Todd. Hutchinson of London, 1959.
- Walker, Alexander. Elizabeth: The Life of Elizabeth Taylor. Grove Press, 2001. ISBN 0-8021-3769-5

Husband of Elizabeth Taylor
| Preceded by Michael Wilding | Husband of Elizabeth Taylor (by order of marriage); 1957–1958 | Succeeded by Eddie Fisher |

Producer of Academy Award for Best Picture
| Preceded by Harold Hecht; Marty | Oscar-Winning Producer; Around the World in 80 Days; Year awarded: 1957 | Succeeded by Sam Spiegel; The Bridge on the River Kwai |
