= Doc Cook =

American jazz bandleader and arranger (1891–1958)

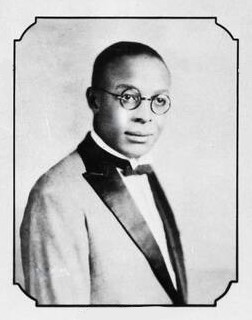
- Doc Cook, ca. 1910

Background information
- Also known as: Doc Cook
- Born: Charles L. Cooke; September 2, 1891; Louisville, Kentucky, U.S.
- Died: December 25, 1958 (aged 67) Wurtsboro, New York, U.S.
- Genres: Jazz
- Occupation(s): Musician, bandleader, arranger
- Labels: Gennett

Charles L. Cooke (September 3, 1891 – December 25, 1958), known as Doc Cook, was an American jazz bandleader and arranger. Cook was a Doctor of Music, awarded by the Chicago Musical College in 1926.

== Life ==
Born in Louisville, he first worked as a composer and arranger in Detroit before moving to Chicago around 1910. Cook became resident leader of the orchestra at Paddy Harmon's Dreamland Ballroom in Chicago from 1922 to 1927, acting as conductor and musical director.

The ensemble recorded under several names, such as Cookie's Gingersnaps, Doc Cook and his 14 Doctors of Syncopation, and Doc Cook's Dreamland Orchestra. Among those who played in Cook's band were Freddie Keppard, Jimmie Noone, Johnny St. Cyr, Zutty Singleton, Joe Poston, Andrew Hilaire, and Luis Russell. After 1927 Cook's orchestra played in Chicago at the Municipal Pier and the White City Ballroom.

In 1930, Cook moved to New York City and worked as an arranger for Radio City Music Hall and RKO, working there into the 1940s. On Broadway, he had a number of important orchestration credits, including The Hot Mikado (1939) and the first U.S. production of The Boy Friend in collaboration with Ted Royal in 1954. A proponent of ragtime, he also worked frequently with Eubie Blake, supplying the arrangements for the 1952 revival of Shuffle Along.

== Recordings ==
Cook recorded 6 sides for Gennett in early 1924, as Cook's Dreamland Orchestra , then 4 sides for OKeh in June 1926 as Cookie's Gingersnaps. In July 1926 Doc Cook signed to Columbia, with which recorded 14 sides 6 through March 1928.

1923-27 - Freddie Keppard, The Complete Set 1923-26 (Retrieval RTR79017, 2005). The CD contains the 6 Gennett and the 4 Okeh sides plus 8 Columbia, all with Keppard on cornet.

== Sources ==
- Doc Cook at IMDb
