= Hot Mikado =

Musical comedy

- Logo
- Music: Rob Bowman
- Lyrics: David H. Bell
- Book: David H. Bell
- Basis: Gilbert and Sullivan's The Mikado
- Productions: 1986 Washington DC

Hot Mikado is a musical comedy, based on Gilbert and Sullivan's 1885 comic opera The Mikado, adapted by David H. Bell (book and lyrics) and Rob Bowman (orchestrations and arrangements). After researching the 1939 Broadway musical, The Hot Mikado, and being disappointed at the amount of surviving material that they could find, Bell and Bowman created a new adaptation, Hot Mikado. "Not much remains, however, of the 1939 show’s African-American emphasis, save the cool hipster style which even then was beginning to be eagerly pre-empted by Americans of every ethnicity."

Their original production ran from March 18 – July 27, 1986 at Ford's Theatre in Washington, DC, where Bell was artistic director. Bell directed and choreographed the production. The musical also had an early Chicago production, among other revivals and ran in London's West End in 1995. It has enjoyed many additional productions in North America and the UK since then.

== Production details ==
The plot of Hot Mikado does not stray far from the Gilbert and Sullivan original, with a similar satiric tone. Katisha is played as a vamp. Ko-Ko is characterized in a manner similar to such characters as Sergeant Bilko. An extra male character, Junior, is added, who takes some of Pish-Tush's lines and sings the solo in "Braid the raven hair." The show is set in Japan in the 1940s, with suggested settings and costuming combining Japanese design with American 1940s design. The set uses Japanese architecture, executed in the textures of The Cotton Club (neon, brass, mahogany). The costumes include zoot suits, snoods, wedgies and felt hats, executed in the colorful silk kimono textures of Japan.

The score uses much of Sullivan's original music but is reorchestrated using 1940s popular musical harmonies and arrangements and a wide range of styles, including jazz, hot gospel, blues, rock, Cab Calloway swing, and torch songs. The 'Three Little Maids' sing in Andrews Sisters' style. Many of the songs of Hot Mikado have the same name and melody as in The Mikado, but often have a twist. For example, the song "I Am So Proud" has the same melody for the verses, changing only towards the end, where it folds into a more jazzy round. The dances called for include the Lindy Hop, tap-dancing, the jitterbug and other 1940s dances.

The orchestration calls for double bass (db. Bass Guitar), percussion (db. impani, duck call, glockenspiel, large gong, mark tree, triangle and wood block), alto saxophone (db. clarinet/flute), trombone (db. cowbell), and trumpet (db. flugelhorn/tambourine).

== Subsequent productions ==
=== 1995 Washington DC and early US productions ===
The original producers staged productions at the Marriott Theatre in Lincolnshire, Illinois in 1993 and again in 2003. A 1995 production played in Washington, DC, again at Ford's Theatre. The production received Helen Hayes Awards for Outstanding Director—Resident Musical—David H. Bell; and Outstanding Lead Actor—Resident Musical—Ross Lehman (Ko-Ko). Other productions led to nominations for the 1995 Helen Hayes Award: Outstanding Resident Musical, 2004 Los Angeles Ovation Award: Best Musical and 2005 Los Angeles Drama Critics Award: Best Production. Bell has directed several other professional productions after 1986, including in his home city of Chicago.

=== 1995 West End ===
A production was mounted in London's West End at the Queen's Theatre in 1995 (after a tryout in Bromley's Churchill Theatre) and ran for three months. It was nominated for an Olivier Award for Best New Musical. The cast included Lawrence Hamilton as the Mikado, Paul Manuel as Nanki-Poo, Ross Lehman as Ko-Ko, Richard Lloyd King as Pooh-Bah, Ben Richards as Pish-Tush, Neil Couperthwaite as Junior, Paulette Ivory as Yum-Yum, Alison Jiear as Pitti-Sing, Veronica Hart as Peep-Bo and Sharon Benson as Katisha. Bell directed, and the musical director for the production was Simon Lee, who also supervised the preparation of a cast recording (First Night: CD48). The show received good notices, with Plays International writing, "all the disparate elements come together into a very lively and enjoyable evening."

=== Off West End ===
The Gordon Craig Theatre in Stevenage produced the musical in August 2001, with direction and choreography by Scott St. Martyn. It starred Rustie Lee, Leee John and Tamsier Joof Aviance. In 2004, an off-West End production ran Upstairs at the Gatehouse. The piece was revived again in London, at the Landor Theatre, in late 2012.

=== Later productions ===
Craig Revel Horwood directed, and Sarah Travis music directed, a successful production of Hot Mikado at the Watermill Theatre in England in 2006, which was revived there in 2009, followed by a tour.

Starlight Theatre in San Diego, California produced the show in 2006, directed and choreographed by Carlos Mendoza, with music direction and choreography by Parmer Fuller.

In 2010, the New Repertory Theatre of Watertown, Massachusetts mounted a production, as did Drury Lane Oakbrook Terrace Theatre in Illinois.

Other professional productions have included a long-running Prague staging and a run in Dublin. Many community groups and high schools have performed the show in the United States, United Kingdom, Ireland, Australia and Canada.

== Roles ==
- The Mikado, Baritone – The Big "Cat" of Japan
- Nanki-Poo, Tenor – The Son of the Mikado
- Yum-Yum, Soprano – The Ward of Titipu's Lord High Executioner
- Pitti-Sing, Mezzo-soprano – Yum-Yum's Sister
- Peep-Bo, Soprano – Yum-Yum's Sister
- Pish-Tush, Tenor – The "Coolest" Gentleman of Japan
- Ko-Ko, Baritone – Lord High Executioner
- Pooh-Bah, bass – Lord High "Everything Else"
- Katisha, Contralto – Spurned Elderly Suitor of Nanki-Poo
- Also 6 gentlemen of Japan and 3 ladies of Japan

Casting is intended to be interracial, with the Mikado, Katisha and Pooh-Bah specifically singing in African-American musical styles.

== Musical numbers ==
Act I

- Overture
- "We Are Gentlemen of Japan" – The Gentlemen
- "Wand'ring Minstrel" – Nanki-Poo and the Gentlemen
- "And the Drums Will Crash" – Pooh-Bah and Ensemble
- "Behold the Lord High Executioner" – Ko-Ko and the Gentlemen
- "I've Got a Little List" – Ko-Ko and the Gentlemen
- "Three Little Maids" – Yum-Yum, Peep-Bo and Pitti-Sing
- "This Is What I'll Never Do" – Yum-Yum and Nanki-Poo
- "I Am So Proud" – Pooh-Bah, Pish-Tush and Ko-Ko
- "Let the Throng Our Joy Advance" – Nanki-Poo, Yum-Yum and Ensemble
- "Katisha's Entrance" – Katisha
- "For He's Gonna Marry Yum-Yum" – Pitti-Sing and Ensemble
- "Hour of Gladness" – Katisha
- "Finale/Act One" – Ensemble

Act II

- Entr'acte
- "Braid the Raven Hair" – Pish-Tush and Ensemble
- "Sun and I" – Yum-Yum
- "Swing a Merry Madrigal" – Nanki-Poo, Pitti-Sing, Yum-Yum and Pish-Tush
- "Here's a Howdy-Do" – Nanki-Poo, Yum-Yum and Ko-Ko
- "Mikado Song" – The Mikado and Ensemble
- "Alone and Yet Alive" – Katisha
- "Tit-Willow" – Ko-Ko
- "Beauty in the Bellow" – Ko-Ko and Katisha
- "Finale" – Ensemble
- Playout
