= Three Little Maids from School Are We =

Song from Gilbert and Sillivan's The Mikado

- Opera trio by Gilbert and Sullivan
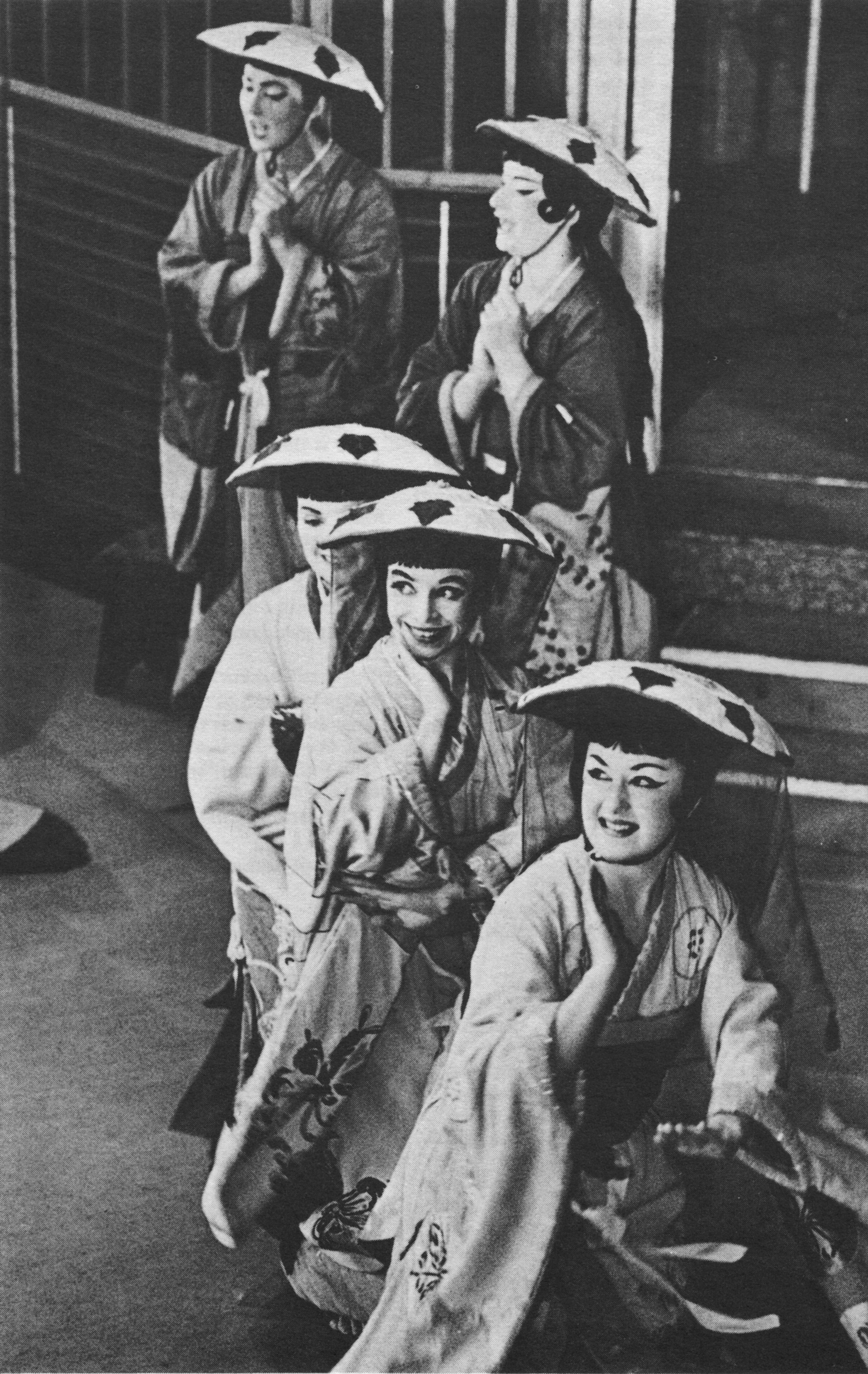
- Joanne Moore, Jennifer Toye and Peggy Ann Jones as the three little maids (1962)
- Year: 1885

"Three Little Maids from School Are We", sometimes listed as "Three Little Maids", is a song from Act I of Gilbert and Sullivan's comic opera The Mikado. The song is a trio for three female characters who are schoolmates; at the end of the song, the three are joined by the chorus of female schoolmates. The three friends sing that they are "filled to the brim with girlish glee", find "fun" in life and "come from a ladies' seminary".

== Background ==
In an 1885 interview with the New-York Daily Tribune, W. S. Gilbert said that the short stature of Leonora Braham, Jessie Bond and Sybil Grey "suggested the advisability of grouping them as three Japanese school-girls", the opera's "three little maids". He also recounted that a young Japanese woman, a tea server at the nearby Japanese village exhibition, came to rehearsals to coach the three little maids in Japanese dance. On 12 February 1885, one month before The Mikado premiered in London, The Illustrated London News wrote about the opening of the Japanese village noting, among other things, that "the graceful, fantastic dancing featured ... three little maids!"

== Synopsis and analysis ==
The song is a trio for three female characters, the schoolgirls Yum-Yum, the leading soprano of the opera, Pitti-Sing, a mezzo-soprano soubrette, and Peep-Bo, another friend of Yum-Yum's. Near the beginning of the opera, Nanki-Poo, disguised as a poor minstrel, but secretly the son of the Mikado (the emperor of Japan), has returned to the Town of Titipu to inquire about his beloved, Yum-Yum, who is a ward of Ko-Ko, who has become, in Nanki-Poo's absence, the town's Lord High Executioner. Pooh-Bah, a high officer of state, informs Nanki-Poo that Yum-Yum is scheduled to marry her Ko-Ko on the very day that he has returned. Ko-Ko arrives, soon followed by Yum-Yum, Peep-Bo, Pitti-Sing and their schoolmates, all of whom have recently been "freed" from school, and the three friends introduce themselves with this song.

The characters sing that they are "filled to the brim with girlish glee", find "fun" in life and "come from a ladies' seminary". The three schoolgirls note, arithmetically, that the "total sum" of three little maids is reached by adding the bride, Yum-Yum, to the two others who are "in attendance" on her for her wedding, and that if the bride is subtracted from the three, the other two "remain". After the song, it is revealed that Yum-Yum does not love her guardian Ko-Ko and, instead, returns Nanki-Poo's love. Before Ko-Ko's marriage to Yum-Yum takes place, complications ensue that result in Ko-Ko agreeing that Nanki-Poo may marry Yum-Yum in exchange for agreeing to be beheaded in one month. Pitti-Sing and Peep-Bo help Yum-Yum prepare for this new marriage. It turns out, however, that the law provides that wives of married men who are beheaded must be buried alive. After the Mikado arrives in the town, all of the complications are eventually resolved, and Yum-Yum is able safely to marry Nanki-Poo.

The song is the 7th musical number in Act 1 of The Mikado. It is written in 2/4 time in the key of C major, consisting of two verses and a choral reprise. The three soloists alternate trio harmonies with solo lines; the female chorus of schoolgirls joins the three soloists at the end of the 2nd verse. The rhyme scheme of the song's lyrics is as follows: verse 1. AAAB, CCCB, DDDB; verse 2. EEEB, FFFB, DDDB (the last together with chorus).

== In popular culture ==
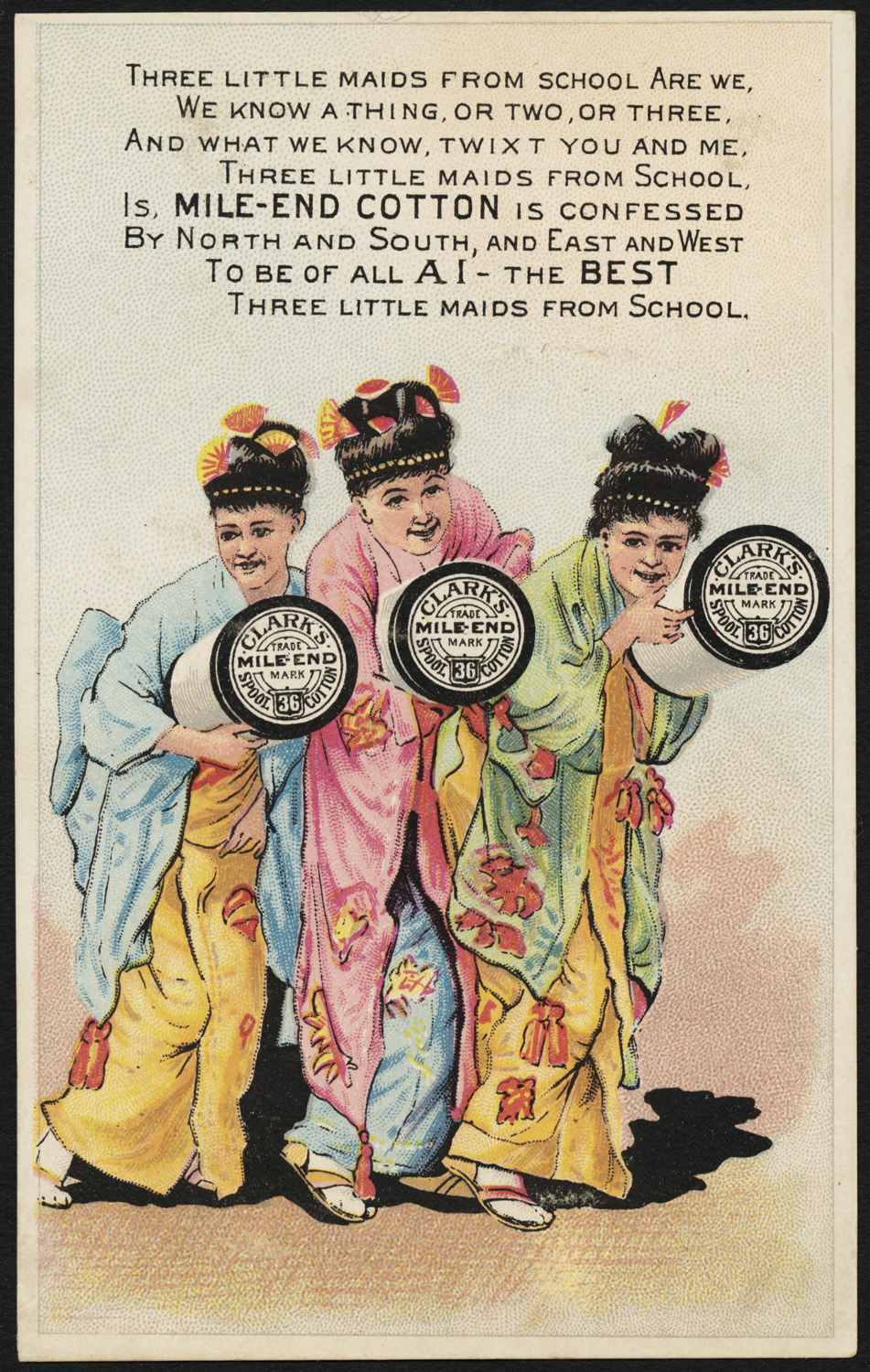
Advertisement for Clark's Mile-End 36 Spool Cotton

The song is featured in the 1981 film Chariots of Fire, where Harold Abrahams first sees his future wife dressed as one of the Three Little Maids.

Television programmes that have featured the song include the Cheers episode "Simon Says", the Frasier episode "Leapin' Lizards", the Angel episode "Hole in the World", The Simpsons episode "Cape Feare", The Suite Life of Zack & Cody episode "Lost in Translation", and the Animaniacs episode "Hello Nice Warners". The song is performed in the Magnum, P.I. episode, "Let the Punishment Fit the Crime." On The Dinah Shore Chevy Show, Shore sang the song with Joan Sutherland and Ella Fitzgerald in 1963. Rebellion (2026), shows its three primary female characters performin the song on stage in 1914. Larry David's Curb Your Enthusiasm frequently uses an instrumental version of the song.

The Capitol Steps performed a parody titled "Three Little Kurds from School Are We" about conditions in Iraq and "Three little wives of Newt", a 2012 lampoon of candidate Newt Gingrich's marital issues. The song is quoted at length and is used metaphorically in the epilogue of Evelyn Waugh’s 1932 satirical novel Black Mischief. In 2016, the song was one of 246 featured in Taylor Mac's A 24-Decade History of Popular Music.

== Recordings ==
"Favorite airs from The Mikado"
A 1914 Edison Records recording of selections, including "Three little maids" (starts at 1:00).

Double A-Side singles:

- Billy Bunch and His Smoky Rhythm, 1939
- Black Mikado, cast recording, 1975
- Hot Mikado, West End cast recording 1995
