= Recordings and discography of The Black Mikado =

The Black Mikado

Cast recording by Original London Cast
- Released: 1975
- Recorded: October 1975
- Studios: Basing Street, Island
- Length: 56:25
- Label: Transatlantic
- Producer: Dave Bloxham

Singles from The Black Mikado
- 1. "The Sun and I" Released: 1975; 2. "So Please You Sir" Released: 1975; 3. "Tit Willow" b/w "I've Got a Little List" Released: 1975

The Black Mikado is a musical comedy, based on Gilbert and Sullivan's The Mikado, adapted by Janos Bajtala, George Larnyoh and Eddie Quansah from W. S. Gilbert's original 1885 libretto and Arthur Sullivan's score. The show premiered on 24 April 1975 at the Cambridge Theatre in London, where it ran for 472 performances before going on a national tour. A cast album was produced in October 1975 featuring 12 of the show's songs, and a medley of numbers from the finale of act one. It was recorded at Basing Street Studios in London, then finished at Island Studios.

In 1976 a production of the musical was mounted in Soweto, South Africa, where it played at the Diepkloof Hall. Another cast album was recorded for this production.

== Musical numbers ==
The numbers listed in the 1975 and 1976 recordings were as follows. The show had additional musical numbers.

== London Cast Recording ==
=== Track List ===
All tracks are written by George Larnyoh, Eddie Quansah, Bajtala János, and Dave Bloxham. Adapted from lyrics by W. S. Gilbert and music by Arthur Sullivan.

Side One
No.	Title	Performed by	Length
1.	"If You Want to Know Who We Are" (Gentlemen of Japan)	Carl Andrews, Anthony D Clarke, Ray Evans, Les Saxon, Reg Tribe, Eddie Tagoe, Trevor Ward, and Ken Herbert; Gentlemen of Japan	2:32
2.	"A Wand'ring Minstrel I" (Shreds and Patches)	Norman Beaton; Nanki-Poo and Gentlemen of Japan	5:20
3.	"Behold the Lord High Executioner" (Taken from The County Jail)	Derek Griffiths; Ko-Ko and Gentlemen of Japan	2:19
4.	"Three Little Maids from School" (Filled to the Brim with Girlish Glee)	Patricia Ebigwei, Jenny McGusty, and Floella Benjamin, with Ester Byrde, Glenna Forster Jones, Sallimatu Kamara, Eva Lewis, Agnes Stanley, Joanne White, and Rosita Yarboy; Yum-Yum, Peep-Bo, Pitti-Sing, and Ladies of Japan	1:58
5.	"So Please You Sir We Much Regret" (Youth of Course Must Have Its Fling)	Patricia Ebigwei, Jenny McGusty, Floella Benjamin, and Michael Denison; Yum-Yum, Peep-Bo, Pitti-Sing, and Pooh-Bah, with Ladies of Japan	2:40
6.	"Finale. Act One" (With Aspect Stern and Gloomy Stride; The Threatened Cloud Has Passed Away; Long Life To You; Your Revels Cease/Oh Fool, That Fleest My Hallowed Joys!; For He's Going To Marry Yum-Yum; The Hour of Gladness Is Dead and Gone/O Ni! Bikkuri Shakkuri To!; We Do Not Heed Their Dismal Sound/Ye Torrents Roar)	Michael Denison, Derek Griffiths, Norman Beaton, Vernon Nesbeth, Floella Benjamiyn, Jenny McGusty, Patricia Ebigwei, and Anita Tucker; Full Company excluding Mikado	16:07
Total length:			30:56

Side Two
No.	Title	Performed by	Length
7.	"The Sun Whose Rays Are All Ablaze" (The Sun and I)	Patricia Ebigwei; Yum-Yum	5:18
8.	"Mi-Ya-Sa-Ma, Mi-Ya-Sa-Ma" (From Every Kind of Man)	Val Pringle and Anita Tucker; The Mikado and Katisha, with the Ladies and Gentlemen of Japan	1:23
9.	"A More Humane Mikado" (My Object All Sublime)	Val Pringle; The Mikado, with Ladies and Gentlemen of Japan	6:38
10.	"The Criminal Cried" (Snicker Snee)	Floella Benjamin, Derek Griffiths, and Michael Denison; Pitti-Sing, Ko-Ko, and Pooh-Bah, with Ladies and Gentlemen of Japan	3:35
11.	"The Flowers that Bloom in The Spring"	Norman Beaton, Derek Griffiths, Patricia Ebigwei, Floella Benjamin, and Michael Denison; Nanki-Poo, Ko-Ko, Yum-Yum, Pitti-Sing, and Pooh-Bah	1:39
12.	"On a Tree by a River" (Tit Willow)	Derek Griffiths; Ko-Ko	2:56
13.	"Alone and Yet Alive" (Hearts Do Not Break)	Anita Tucker; Katisha	4:00
Total length:			25:29

=== Personnel ===
==== The Titipu Town Band ====
===== GEP Horns =====
- Eddie Quansah: Trumpet, Flugel and French Horn, Additional Percussion. Music Adaptation
- George Larnyoh: Alto Sax. Music Adaptation
- Peter Vanderpuije: Baritone Sax

===== Juice =====
- Willie Cheetham: Percussion
- Janos Bajtala: Keyboards. Music Adaptation
- Graeme Morgan: Drums
- John Varnom: Lead, Rhythm, and Acoustic Guitar
- Colin Vallance: Bass Guitar

==== Production + Technical ====
- Music Production: Dave Bloxham
- Executive Producer: James Verner
- Engineer: Phil Ault
- Assistant Engineer: Barry Sage

=== The singles ===
Three singles were issued alongside the album. The first of these is a single edit of "The Sun Whose Rays...", with the instrumental bridge after the 2nd chorus excised. A second single features only the "Oh Fool, That Fleest My Hallowed Joys!" part of "Finale Act One" as its B-side. Finally two new studio recordings were made by Derek Griffiths with a different arrangement of "Tit Willow", and "I've Got A Little List" which is not on the Soundtrack Album.

== South African cast recording ==
=== Track listing ===
Side one
No.	Title	Performed by	Length
1.	"If You Want to Know Who We Are"	Philip Malela, Steve Mofokeng, Ernest Mokone, Gobi Martin, Shadrack Moyo; Gentlemen of Japan
2.	"A Wand'ring Minstrel I"	Leslie Mongezi; Nanki-Poo and Gentlemen of Japan
3.	"Behold the Lord High Executioner and Taken from a County Jail"	Sammy Brown; Ko-Ko and Gentlemen of Japan
4.	"Three Little Maids from School"	Lorraine Klaasen, Sue Kiel, and Barrie Shah, with Harriet Matiwane, Felicia Nkomo, Felicia Marion, and Caroline Perry; Yum-Yum, Peep-Bo, Pitti-Sing, and the Ladies of Japan
5.	"So Please You Sir, We Much Regret"	Des Lindberg; Van Der Pooh Bah and the Ladies of Japan
6.	"The Finale Act I" (including: A) The Threatened Cloud Has Passed Away B) Long Life to You; C) Your Revels Cease and Oh Fool D) For He's Gone and Married Yum-Yum; E) The Hour of Gladness Is Dead and Gone F) We Do Not Heed Their Dismal Sound)	Tandie Klaasen; Katisha and the Company

Side two
No.	Title	Performed by	Length
7.	"Braid the Raven Hair"	Barrie Shah; Pitti-Sing and the Ladies of Japan
8.	"The Sun Whose Rays Are All Ablaze"	Lorraine Klaasen; Yum-Yum and the Ladies of Japan
9.	"Entrance of the Mikado and His Daughter-in-Law Elect"	Ben Masinga and Tandie Klaasen; The Mikado, Katisha, and the Company
10.	"See How the Fates their Gifts Allot"	Ben Masinga, Des Lindberg, and Tandie Klassen; The Mikado, Van Der Pooh Bah, Katisha, and The Company
11.	"The Flowers that Bloom the Spring"	Leslie Mongezi, Sammy Brown, Barrie Shah, Sue Kiel, Lorraine Klassen, and Des Lindberg; Nanki-Poo, Ko-Ko, Pitti-Sing, Peep-Bo, Yum-Yum, and Van Der Pooh Bah
12.	"Tit Willow"	Sammy Brown; Ko-Ko
13.	"Drum Celebration"	The Company
14.	"Reprises: Wandr'ing Minstrel and Tit Willow"	The Company

=== Personnel ===
==== Production and technical ====
- Produced, directed, designed and choreographed: Dawn Lindberg
- Musical director: Gerry Collins
- Vocal director: Irene Frangs
- Musical adaptation: Eddie Quansah, George Larnyoh, Janos Bajtala
- Musical production: Dave Bloxham
- Recording engineer: Julian Laxton, Meyer Van Rensburg

==== The Titipu Town Band: Spirits Rejoice ====
- Gilbert Matthews: Drums
- Sipho Gumede: Bass
- Duke Makasi: Sax
- George Tyefumani: Trumpet
- Russell Herman: Guitar
- Merwyn Africa: Keyboard
- Gerry Collins: Conductor and special keyboard
- Irene Frangs: Extra vocals
- Gene Peterson: Additional brass, trumpet and flugelhorn
- Ron Francetti: Tenor sax

== Discography ==
=== Albums ===
Year	Country	Title	Label	Cat. No.	Format
1975	England	The Black Mikado	Transatlantic	TRA 300	LP, 8T, CC
1976	South Africa	Des and Dawn Lindberg Present the South African Cast Recording of The Black Mikado	RPM	RPM 1111	LP
2024	England	The Black Mikado Original London Cast Recording	Stage Door Records	STAGE 9104	CD

=== Singles ===
Year	A-side	B-side	Label	Cat. No.
1975	"The Sun and I"; Black Mikado London Cast featuring Pat Ebigwei	"Three Little Maids from School"; Black Mikado London Cast	Transatlantic	BIG 530
1975	"So Please You Sir"; Black Mikado London Cast	"An Excerpt from Finale Act 1" (Oh Fool, That Fleest My Hallowed Joys!); Black Mikado London Cast featuring Anita Tucker	Transatlantic	BIG 531
1975	"Tit Willow"; Derek Griffiths with Black Mikado London Cast	"I've Got a Little List"; Derek Griffiths with Black Mikado London Cast	Transatlantic	BIG 533
