= The Hot Mikado (1939 production) =

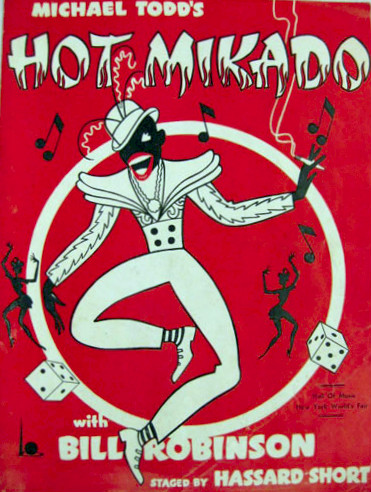
- Poster for The Hot Mikado
- Book: Mike Todd
- Basis: Gilbert and Sullivan's The Mikado
- Productions: 1939 Broadway; 1939 New York World's Fair

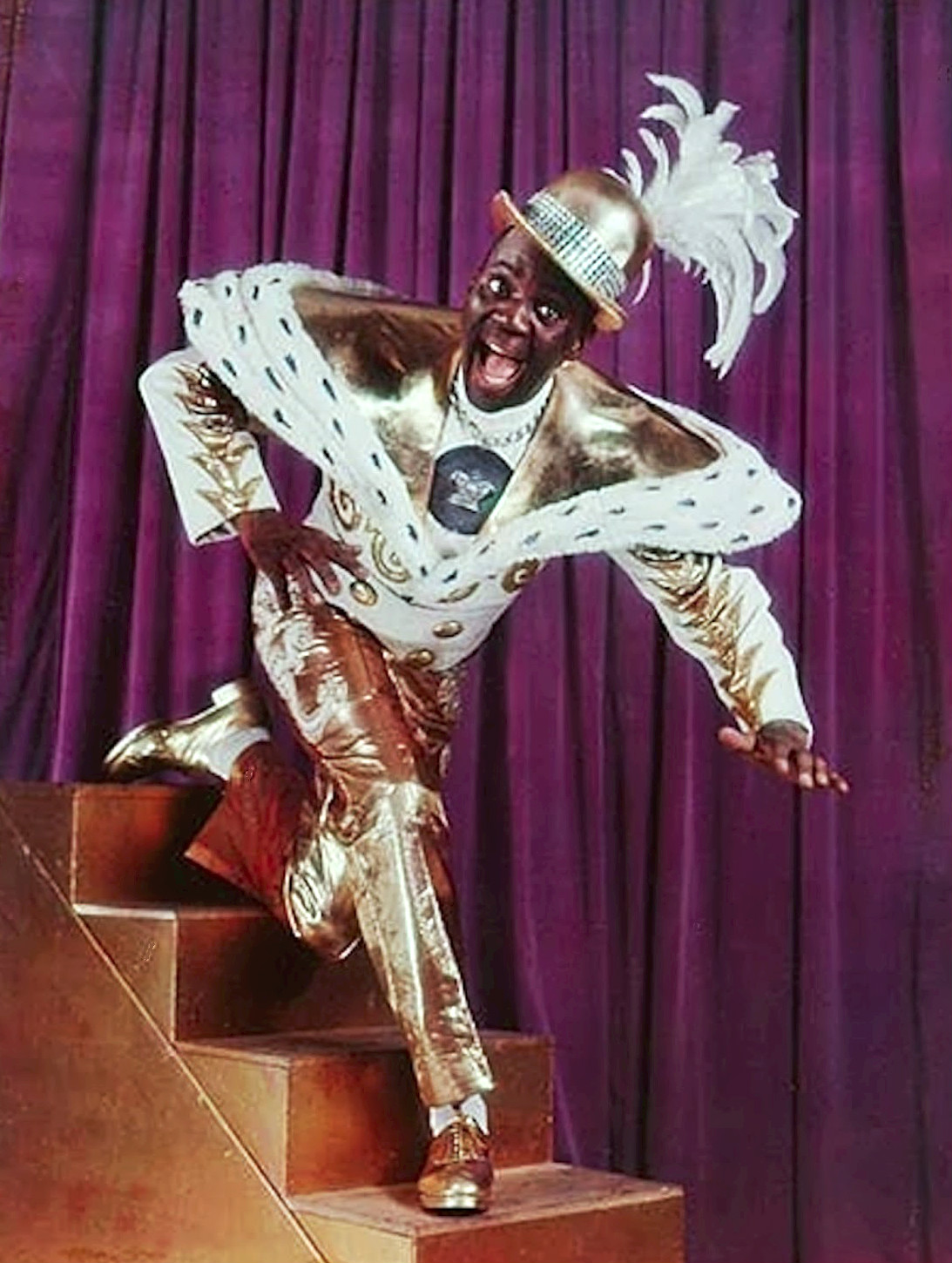
Bill Robinson in The Hot Mikado

The Hot Mikado was a musical theatre adaptation of Gilbert and Sullivan's 1885 comic opera The Mikado with an African-American cast. It was first produced by Mike Todd on Broadway in 1939. It starred Bill "Bojangles" Robinson in the title role, with musical arrangements by Charles L. Cooke and direction by Hassard Short.

== Background ==
Mike Todd produced The Hot Mikado after the Federal Theatre Project turned down his offer to manage the WPA production of The Swing Mikado (another all-black adaptation of The Mikado). Todd's adaptation was jazzier than The Swing Mikado and had a "full-voiced, star-studded cast to back up its sass." It follows both the story line of The Mikado and the spectacle of the original and was noted for its wild costuming. "Rosa Brown's outfit, a winged dress with train and a gigantic hat, weighed thirty-five pounds." The spectacle and jazzed-up score received enthusiastic reviews and drew audiences; "critic George Jean Nathan presented it as the 'best all-around musical show', named Nat Karson 'the season’s best costumer', and hailed two performers, Rosa Brown as 'best blues singer' and, to no one's surprise, Bill 'Bojangles' Robinson as 'best hoofer.'"

== Productions ==
The musical was first produced at the Broadhurst Theatre on West 44th Street from March 23, 1939, to June 3, 1939, running for 85 performances. The original cast included Bill "Bojangles" Robinson as The Mikado; Frances Brock as Pitti-Sing; Rosa Brown as Katisha; Maurice Ellis as Pooh-Bah; Eddie Green as Ko-Ko; Rosetta LeNoire as Peep-Bo; James A. Lilliard as Pish-Tush; Bob Parrish as Nanki-Poo; Gwendolyn Reyde as Yum-Yum; Freddie Robinson as Messenger Boy; and Vincent Shields as Red Cap. The orchestrations were arranged by Charles L. Cooke, and the production was directed by Hassard Short. Choreography was by Truly McGee. Sets and costumes were designed by Nat Karson (1908–1954).

Thirteen days after The Hot Mikado opened at the Broadhurst, The Swing Mikado – which had been running in New York since March 1, 1939, at the New Yorker Theatre on West 54th Street (modern site of Studio 54) – moved right across the street to the 44th Street Theatre. According to The New York Times:

Todd fought back by hanging a show banner from the side of the Sardi Building – obliterating his rival's marquee from the view of anyone walking east on the block – and then, after the 85th performance, pulled an ace from his sleeve. He sold the show to the World's Fair, where it played through the summer – four times a day, seven days a week – at a price scale (40¢ to 90¢) with which The Swing Mikado could not compete.

The 1939–1940 New York World's Fair production of The Hot Mikado lasted for two seasons and was reportedly one of the most popular attractions at the fair. The show was produced on a large scale there, employing 150 actors.

A summer-stock revival, including Bill "Bojangles" Robinson, produced by Cheryl Crawford, played for one week in 1941 at the Maplewood Theater, in Maplewood, New Jersey.

== Hot Mikado ==
In the 1980s, disappointed that they could not find much of the script and arrangements for The Hot Mikado, writer David H. Bell and musician Rob Bowman created a new jazzy adaptation, Hot Mikado, that has been produced regularly since 1986.

== Selected video ==
- Video clip of scenes from The Hot Mikado at the World's Fair (amateur footage via YouTube)
