= Francis Fleming =

Francis or Frank Fleming may refer to:

- Sir Francis Fleming (colonial administrator) (1842–1922), British colonial administrator
- Francis Fleming (MP) (died 1558), MP for Lyme Regis and Southampton
- Francis P. Fleming (1841–1908), governor of Florida
- Frank Fleming (association footballer) (born 1945), English footballer for Darlington
- Frank Fleming (Australian footballer) (1907–1963), Australian rules footballer for Fitzroy
- Frank Fleming (baseball) (1919–1989), American baseball player
- Frank Fleming (politician) (1953–2022), member of the Montana House of Representatives
- Frank Fleming (racing driver) (born 1959), American race car driver
- Frank Fleming (sculptor), American sculptor
- Frank Fleming (Gaelic footballer) (active 1950s), Gaelic football player for Mayo
