= Give Us This Day (1949 film) =

1949 film directed by Edward Dmytryk

- Italian theatrical poster
- Directed by: Edward Dmytryk
- Screenplay by: Ben Barzman
- Story by: John Penn
- Based on: Christ in Concrete (1939 novel) by Pietro di Donato
- Produced by: Rod E. Geiger; N.A. Bronsten
- Starring: Sam Wanamaker; Lea Padovani; Kathleen Ryan
- Cinematography: C. M. Pennington-Richards
- Edited by: John D. Guthridge
- Music by: Benjamin Frankel
- Production company: Plantagenet Films Ltd.
- Distributed by: General Film Distributors
- Release date: 14 October 1949 (London)
- Running time: 120 minutes
- Country: United Kingdom
- Language: English
- Budget: $600,000 or £195,000
- Box office: £80,000

Give Us This Day (released in the United States as Christ in Concrete, also released as Salt to the Devil) is a 1949 British drama film directed by Edward Dmytryk from a screenplay by Ben Barzman, and starring Sam Wanamaker, Lea Padovani and Kathleen Ryan. It is based on the 1939 semi-autobiographical novel Christ in Concrete by Pietro di Donato, about Italian-American bricklayers in Brooklyn enduring the struggles the Great Depression.

This was one of two films that Dmytryk directed in the United Kingdom in 1949 during his blacklisting. According to Norma Barzman, "it was the hope of [Ben] as well as director Edward Dmytryk that [Give Us This Day] would at least explain the motivations of the Hollywood Ten and at best absolve them."

== Plot ==
The film centers on Geremio di Donato, a second-generation Italian American bricklayer in Brooklyn, during the Great Depression.

== Cast ==
- Sam Wanamaker as Geremio di Donato
- Lea Padovani as Annunziata di Donato
- Kathleen Ryan as Kathleen
- Charles Goldner as Luigi
- Bonar Colleano as Giulio
- William Sylvester as Giovanni
- George Pastell as The Lucy
- Philo Hauser as Head of Pig
- Sid James as Murdin
- Karel Štěpánek as Jaroslav
- Ina De La Haye as Dame Catarina
- Rosalie Crutchley as Giulio's wife

Uncredited

- Ronan O'Casey as Bastian
- Robert Rietti as Pietro
- Charles Moffat as Pasquale

== Production ==
=== Background and development ===
The rights to Pietro di Donato's novel were obtained by Rod E. Geiger, a New York-born US Army Colonel in the Signal Corps who had entered film production after meeting Italian filmmaker Roberto Rossellini, co-producing his landmark neorealist works Rome, Open City and Paisan. Di Donato had become acquainted with Geiger and Rossellini after writing the English-language subtitles for Rome, Open City. Geiger originally wanted Rossellini to direct, with Luise Rainer attached to play Annunziata.

When Rossellini declined, Di Donato suggested Edward Dmytryk after being impressed by his film Crossfire. Production was planned to begin in New York on March 10, 1948, with a cast led by Reiner, Sam Wanamaker, Albert Dekker, and Karen Morley.

=== Hollywood blacklist ===
The production collapsed when it became clear that Dmytryk and screenwriter Ben Barzman would be unable to work in the US after refusing to testify before the House Un-American Activities Committee. Shortly thereafter, Dmytryk told Barzman "I think we can get a production of this in England, if we had a screenplay. It would break the Blacklist." Barzman's widow Norma later said "it was the hope of [Ben] as well as director Edward Dmytryk that Christ in Concrete would at least explain the motivations of the Hollywood Ten and at best absolve them."

Geiger teamed with local British producer N.A. Bronsten. The entire cast was replaced (except for Wanamaker, who was publicly critical of HUAC), with Italian actress Lea Padovani now playing the female lead and the rest of the cast filled out with local British talent.

=== Filming ===
Filming took place at Denham Film Studios and on-location in London. The set was visited by Princesses Elizabeth and Margaret.

== Reception ==
=== Critical response ===
Kine Weekly wrote: "Magnificent, compellingly realistic romantic melodrama, staged in the slums of Brooklyn during the turbulent twenties. ... Sam Wanamaker and Lea Padovani act with their hearts and their heads and put over perfectly timed and consummately natural portrayals as Geremio and Annunziata. Charles Goldner is a revelation as the philosophical Luigi, and Kathleen Ryan is more than adequate in the comparatively small role of Kathleen. The supporting players, like the stars, cannot be faulted. The picture is not only a great love story, but a powerful indictment of the sorry working-class conditions of its times. ... A work of art, as well as an outstanding box-office achievement, it proves that it is no longer necessary to go to Hollywood to make an American picture."

Picture Show wrote: "Here is a memorable though miserable film, strong yet delicate, passionate yet tender, its understanding tinctured with bitterness. Seeing that it was made in England, it is astonishing that the atmosphere and characters of a Brooklyn tenement populated chiefly by poverty-stricken Italian building workers should be so vividly and realistically etched."

The New York Times film critic Bosley Crowther called it "a film drama of considerable graphicness but of oddly limited power." While praising the movie for its "careful and earnest attempt to capture the hard yet wistful quality of Mr. di Donato's tale", Crowther said that "the spirit and compulsion of this deeply distressing tale of poverty and frustration are absent from the film."

Despite positive reviews, the film was a commercial failure in America, due to a protest campaign mounted by the American Legion and other anti-communist groups.

=== Awards and nominations ===
At the 11th Venice International Film Festival, the film was nominated for the Golden Lion, and Dmytryk won the Pasinetti Award.

== Aftermath ==
Dmytryk would eventually return to the US in 1951 and cooperate with HUAC, while Barzman remained in a self-imposed exile in Europe until well into the 1980s. Sam Wanamaker himself was never formally blacklisted, but chose to remain in England after traveling there in 1950 for a play.

According to BFI Screenonline, Give Us This Day was Dmytryk's favourite of his own films.
