= Alvin Sella =

American painter and educator

- Born: c. August 30, 1919; West Hoboken, New Jersey, U.S.
- Died: April 8, 2013; Tuscaloosa, Alabama, U.S.
- Resting place: Tuscaloosa Memorial Park, Tuscaloosa, Alabama, U.S.
- Education: Yale School of Art; Art Students League of New York; Columbia University School of the Arts; Syracuse University's College of Fine Arts; University of New Mexico
- Occupations: Professor, painter
- Spouse: Maria Zavala

Alvin Sella (c. 1920 - April 8, 2013) was an American painter and educator. He was a professor of art at the University of Alabama for more than four decades, and he received the Governor's Arts Award from the Alabama State Council on the Arts in 2009.

== Life ==
Sella was born circa 1920 in West Hoboken, New Jersey. His parents were immigrants from Italy. He was trained at the Yale School of Art, the Art Students League of New York, the Columbia University School of the Arts, Syracuse University's College of Fine Arts, and the University of New Mexico.

Sella began his career in San Miguel de Allende, Mexico, where he painted from 1944 to 1947, and he exhibited his work at the Palacio de Bellas Artes in Mexico City in 1946. He returned to the United States and became the chair of the Art department at Sullins College from 1948 to 1961. He subsequently joined the University of Alabama, where he taught painting and drawing more than four decades. His students included William Christenberry, Frank Fleming, and Thornton Willis.

Sella specialized in oil painting. His work was exhibited widely, including at the Meridian Museum of Art in Meridian, Mississippi in 1974. He received the Governor's Arts Award from the Alabama State Council on the Arts in 2009.

Sella died on April 8, 2013, in Tuscaloosa, at age 93. His funeral was held at St. Francis University Church, and he was buried at the Tuscaloosa Memorial Park.
