= West Hoboken, New Jersey =

West Hoboken
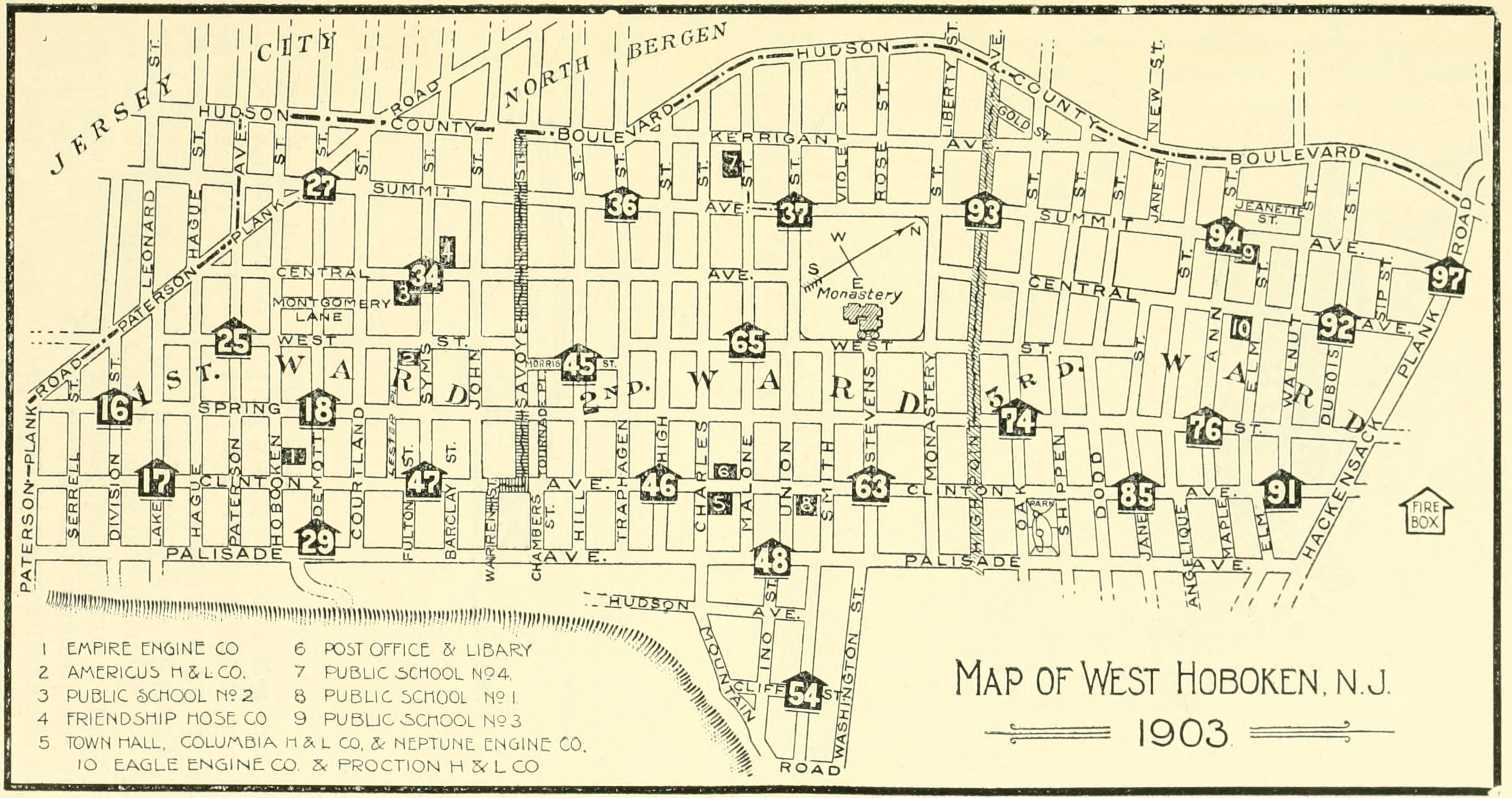
- Coordinates: 40.7613°N 74.0413°W
- Country: United States
- State: New Jersey
- County: Hudson
- Founded: February 28, 1861
- Merged: June 1, 1925

Historical population
Census	Pop.	Note	%±
1870	4,232		—
1880	5,441		28.6%
1890	11,665		114.4%
1900	23,094		98.0%
1910	35,403		53.3%
1920	40,074		13.2%
Population sources: 1870-1920

West Hoboken was a municipality that existed in Hudson County, New Jersey, from 1861 to 1925. It merged with Union Hill to form Union City on June 1, 1925.

The town is notable for being the first city in which Mallomars were sold.

== History ==
=== Early history and civic boundaries ===
The area that became West Hoboken was originally inhabited by the Munsee-speaking branch of Lenape Native Americans, who wandered into the vast woodland area encountered by Henry Hudson during the voyages he conducted from 1609 to 1610 for the Dutch, who later claimed the area (which included the future New York City) and named it New Netherland. The portion of that land that included the future Hudson County was purchased from members of the Hackensack tribe of the Lenni-Lenape in 1658 by New Netherland colony Director-General Peter Stuyvesant, and became part of Pavonia, New Netherland. The boundaries of the purchase are described in the deed preserved in the New York State Archives, as well as the medium of exchange: "80 fathoms of wampum, 20 fathoms of cloth, 12 brass kettles, 6 guns, one double brass kettle, 2 blankets, and one half barrel of strong beer."

The relationship between the early Dutch settlers and Native Americans was marked by frequent armed conflict over land claims. In 1660, Peter Stuyvesant ordered the building of a fortified village called Bergen to protect the area. It was the first permanent European settlement in New Jersey, located in what is now the Journal Square area of Jersey City near Academy Street. In 1664, the British captured New Netherland from the Dutch, at which point the boundaries of Bergen Township encompassed what is now known as Hudson County. North of this was the unpopulated Bergen Woods, which would later be claimed by settlers, after whom a number of Union City streets today are named, including Sip Street, Tournade Lane and Kerrigan Avenue, which is named after J. Kerrigan, the owner of Kerrigan Farm, who donated the land for Saint Michael's Monastery.

The area that became West Hoboken, however, was sparsely populated until the early 19th century. The British granted Bergen a new town charter in 1668. In 1682 they created Bergen County, which was named to honor their Dutch predecessors. That county comprised all of present-day Hudson, Bergen and Passaic counties. Sparsely inhabited during the 17th and 18th centuries, the southeast section of Bergen County had grown by the early 19th century to the point where it was deemed necessary to designate it a separate county. The New Jersey legislature created Hudson County in 1840, and in 1843, it was divided into two townships: Old Bergen Township (which eventually became Jersey City) and North Bergen Township, which was gradually separated into Hudson County's municipalities of Hoboken (1849), Weehawken and Guttenberg (1859), and Union City Township in 1861, though it was colloquially known as Union Hill. West Hoboken was incorporated as a township by an Act of the New Jersey Legislature on February 28, 1861, from portions of North Bergen Township. The township was reincorporated on April 6, 1871, and again on March 27, 1874. Portions of the township were ceded to Weehawken in 1879. On June 28, 1884, West Hoboken was reincorporated as a town, based on an ordinance passed nine days earlier. The town was reincorporated on April 24, 1888, based on the results of a referendum passed 12 days earlier. Union City was incorporated on June 1, 1925, by merging the two towns of West Hoboken and Union Hill.

Photographs of West Hoboken
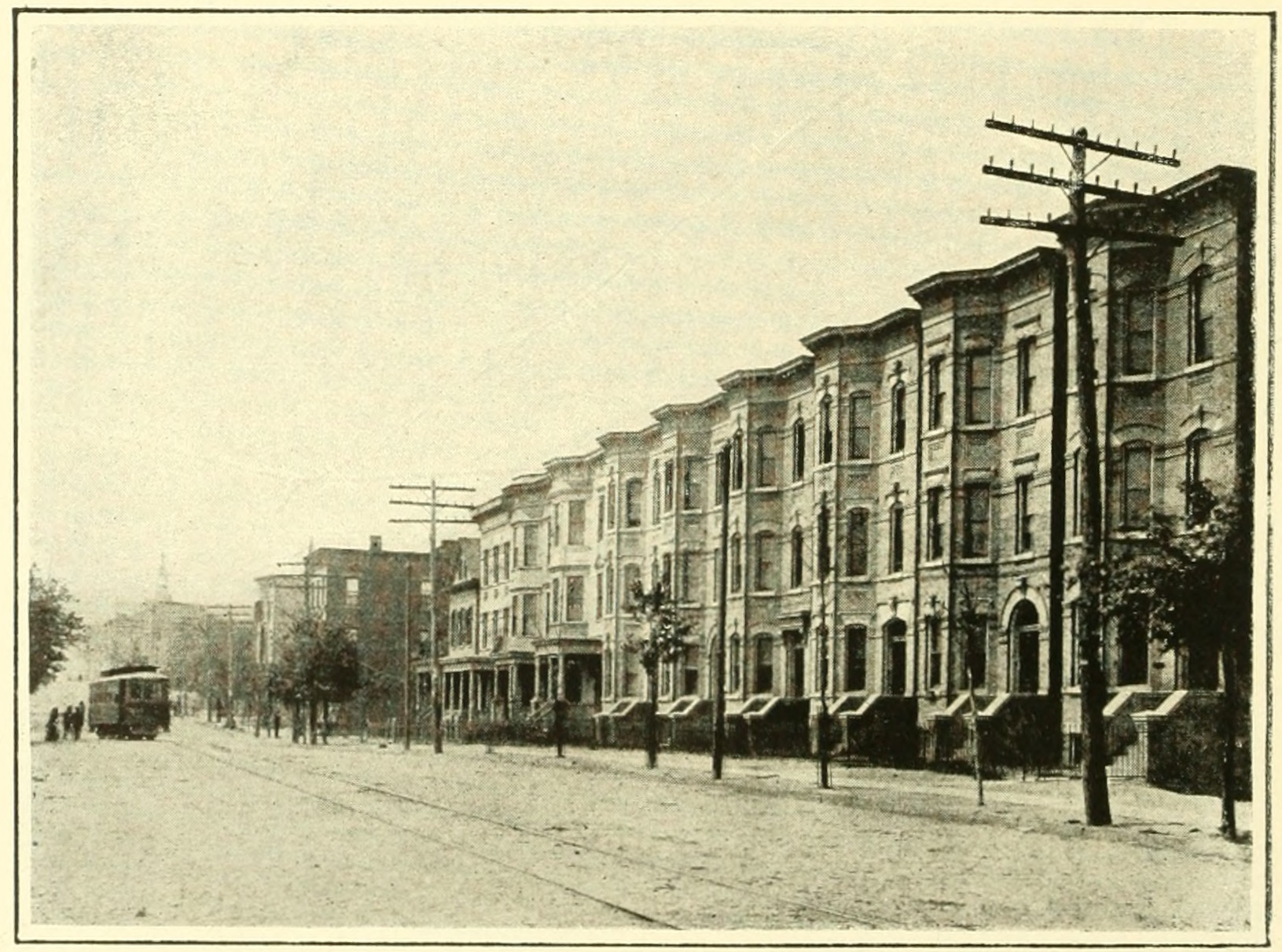
Brownstone houses, now at New York Avenue between Monastery Place and 21st Street

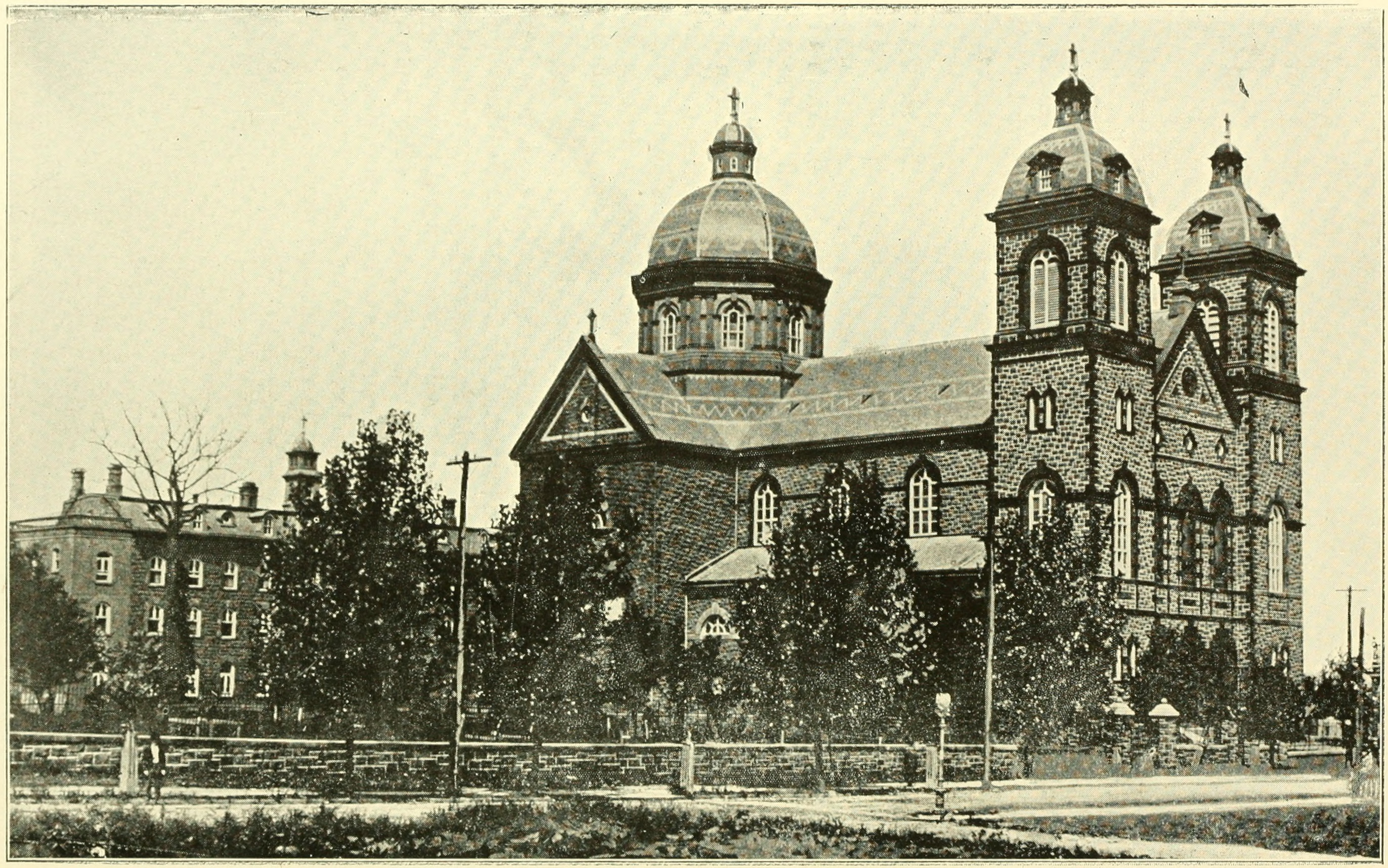
St. Michael's Monastery, located at Monastery Place and West Street

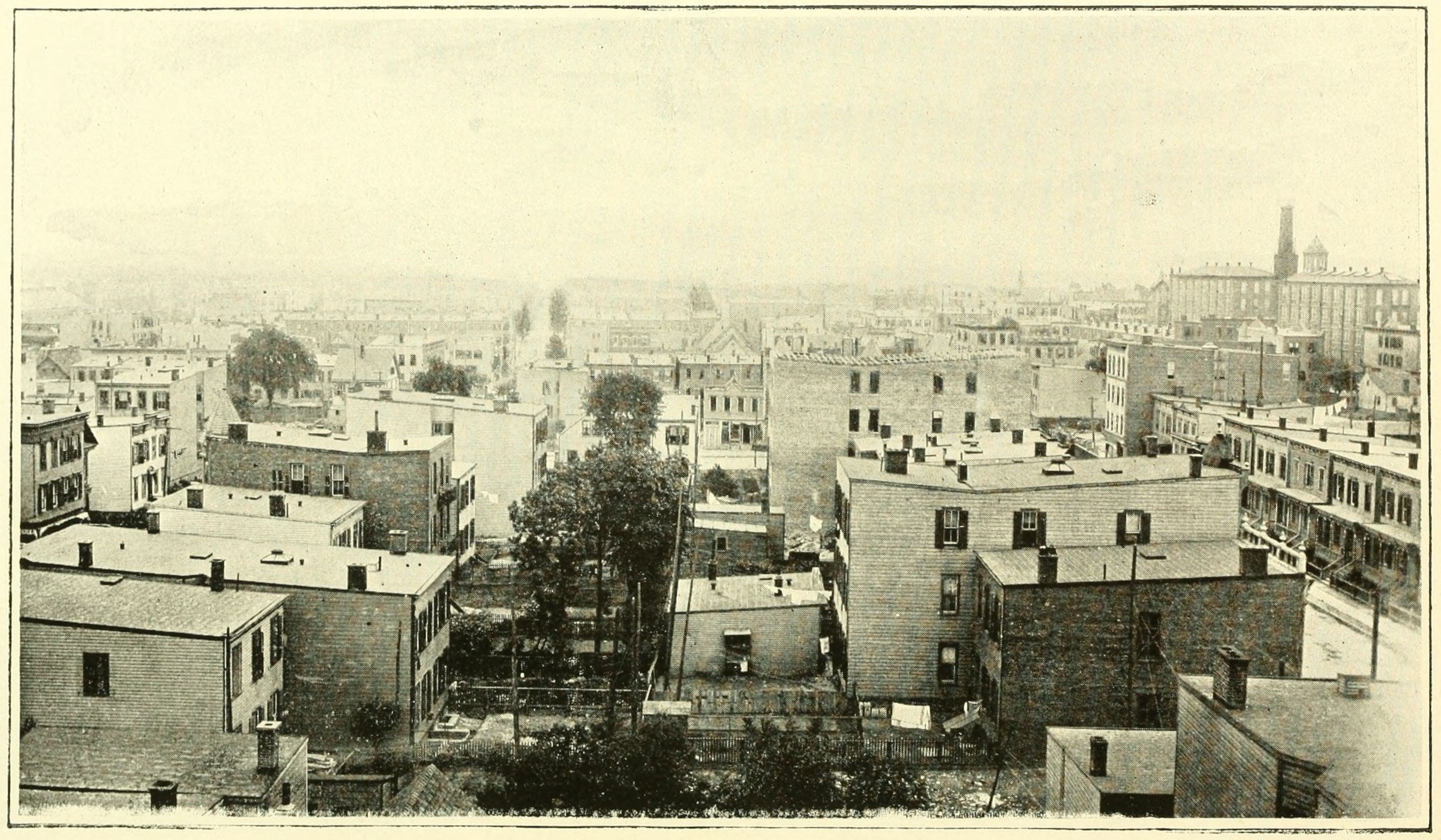
View of West Hoboken from roof of Consumers' Brewery, current location unknown

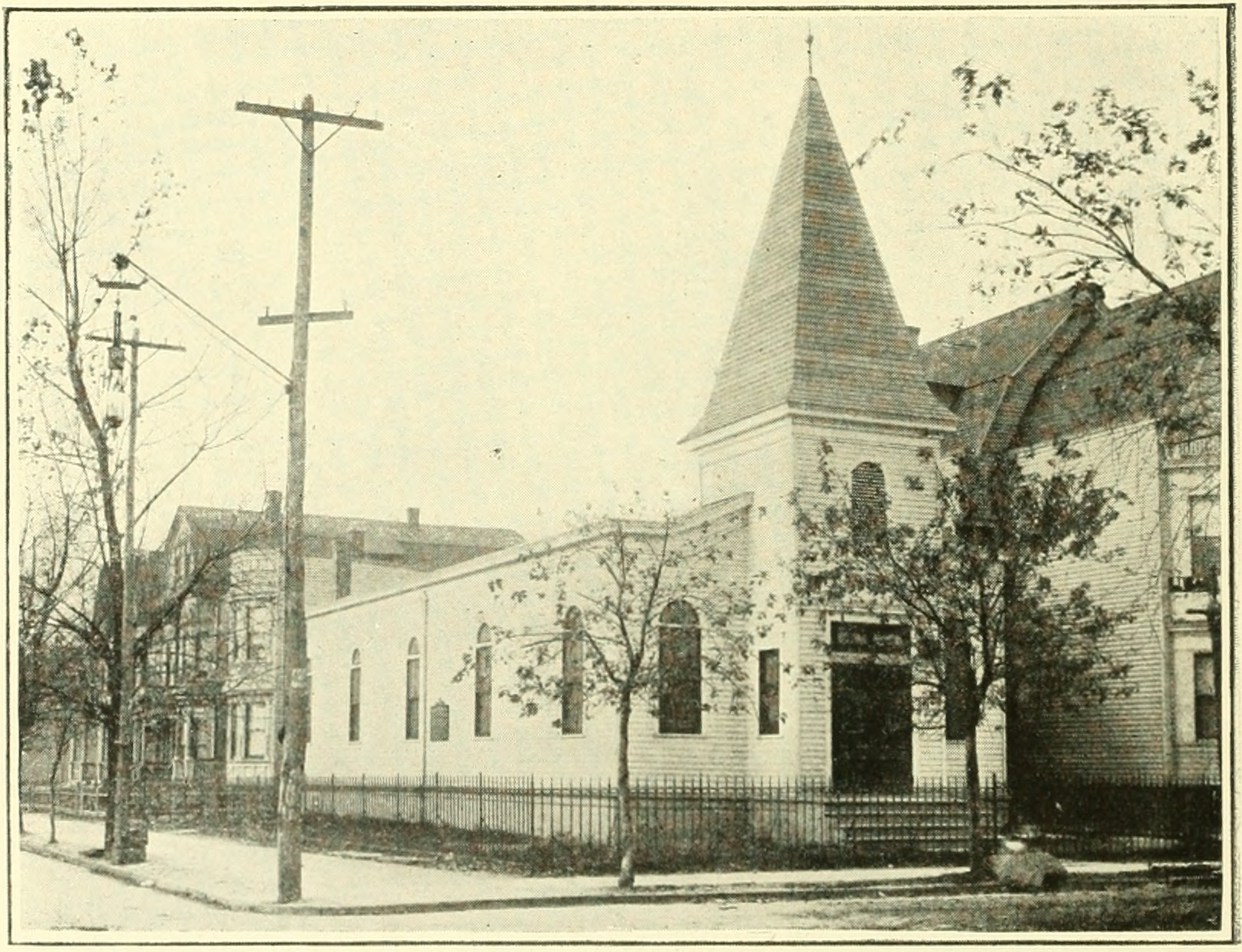
The United Presbyterian church, at Palisade and 24th Street, across from Ellsworth Park

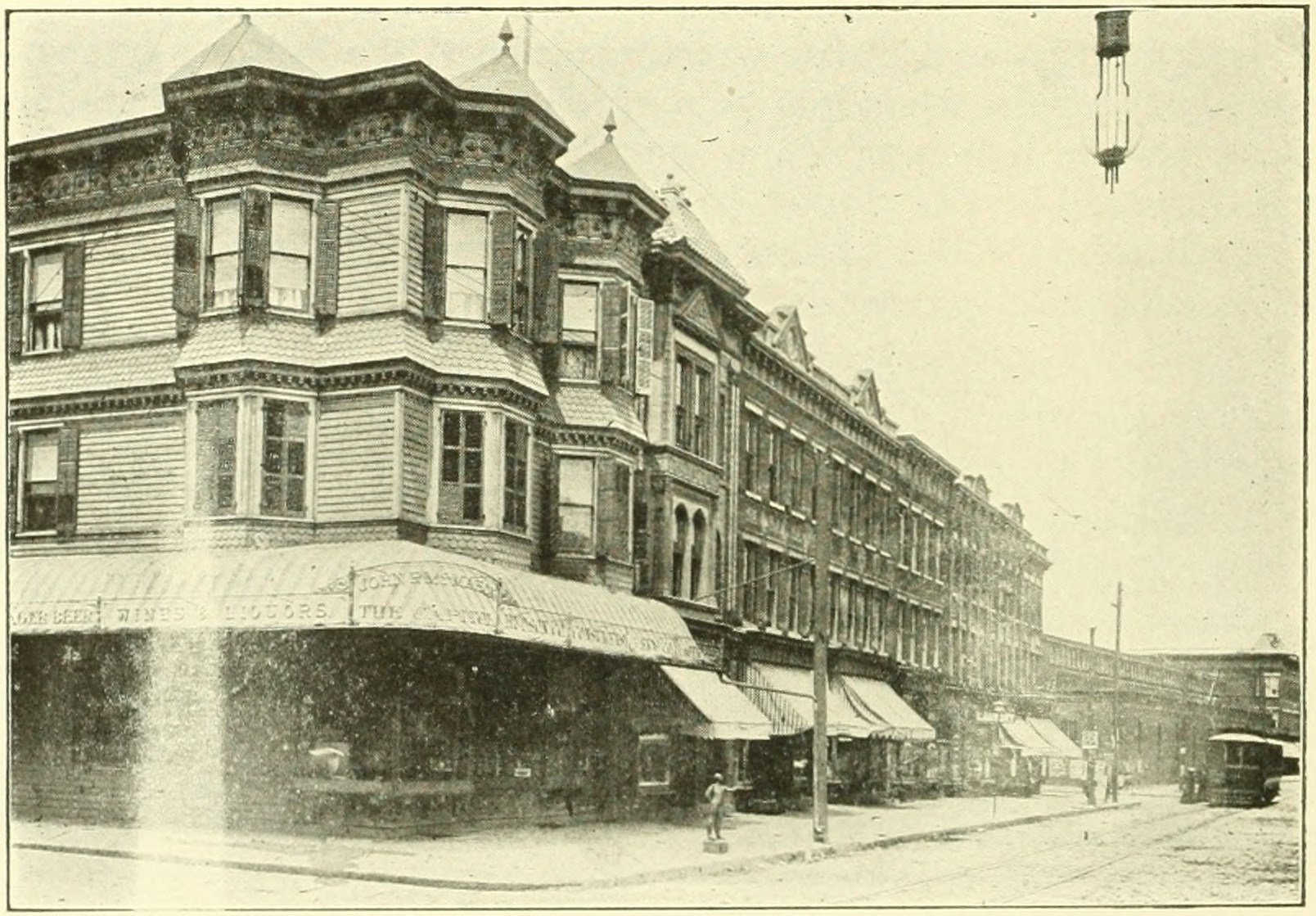
Store fronts, now at Bergenline Avenue and 26th Street

=== Business ===
Mallomars were first sold in a grocery in West Hoboken. The town had two commercial districts. Transfer Station at Paterson Plank Road and Summit Avenue, in the southern part of town, and Bergen Turnpike, at the border with Union Hill.

== Notable people ==
People who were born in, residents of, or otherwise closely associated with West Hoboken include: (B) denotes that the person was born there.

- Charles Avedisian (1917–1983), football player who played in the NFL for the New York Giants (B)
- Pietro Botto (1864–1945), owner of the Pietro and Maria Botto House in Haledon, New Jersey, which was a central location of the 1913 Paterson Silk Strike, and the first Italian American site to be designated a national landmark. Botto emigrated from Biella, Italy in 1892, first settling in West Hoboken.
- James E. Buttersworth (1817–1894), British maritime artist
- Rene Paul Chambellan (1893–1955), sculptor who specialized in architectural sculpture, and one of the foremost practitioners of what was then called the "French Modern Style", or Art Deco (B)
- Pietro di Donato (1911–1992), writer known for his novel, Christ in Concrete (B)
- Antonio Jacobsen (1850–1921), maritime artist known as the "Audubon of Steam Vessels"
- Joe Jeanette (1879–1958), considered one of the best African American heavyweight boxers of the early 20th Century (B)
- Ada Lunardoni (1911–2003), artistic gymnast who competed at the 1936 Summer Olympics and placed fifth with the team (B)
- Otto Messmer (1892–1983), the creator of Felix the Cat (B)
- Ioan Missir (1890–1945), Romanian lawyer, politician and novelist
- William Musto (1917–2006), Mayor of Union City from 1962 to 1970 and from 1974 to 1982
- Arthur Pinajian (1914–1999), Armenian American artist and comic book creator, known as the creator of the characters Madame Fatal and Invisible Hood
- William Ranney (1813–1857), painter best known for his depictions of Western life, sporting scenery, historical subjects and portraiture
- Alvin Sella (c. 1920–2013), painter and educator (B)
- Walter Walsh (1907–2014), FBI agent, USMC shooting instructor and Olympic shooter
- Gene Wettstone (1913–2013), gymnastics coach, known for leading Pennsylvania State University to a record nine N.C.A.A. championships in the sport, and for coaching the U.S. men's teams in the 1948 and 1956 Summer Olympics

== See also ==
- Bergenline Avenue
- North Hudson, New Jersey
- Hoboken Land and Improvement Company Building
