= The Locket (1946 film) =

1946 American film noir by John Brahm

- Theatrical release poster
- Directed by: John Brahm
- Written by: Norma Barzman; Sheridan Gibney
- Produced by: Bert Granet
- Starring: Laraine Day; Brian Aherne; Robert Mitchum; Gene Raymond
- Cinematography: Nicholas Musuraca
- Edited by: J.R. Whittredge
- Music by: Roy Webb
- Production company: RKO Radio Pictures
- Distributed by: RKO Radio Pictures
- Release date: December 20, 1946
- Running time: 85 minutes
- Country: United States
- Language: English
- Box office: $1,750,000 (US)

The Locket is a 1946 American psychological thriller film noir directed by John Brahm, starring Laraine Day, Brian Aherne, Robert Mitchum, and Gene Raymond, and released by RKO Pictures. The film is based on a screenplay by Sheridan Gibney, adapted from "What Nancy Wanted" by Norma Barzman, wife of later-blacklisted writer Ben Barzman. It is noted for its complex use of nested flashbacks within flashbacks to give psychological depth to the narrative.

== Plot ==
A respectable-looking man appears unannounced and uninvited at an upper crust wedding at a Park Avenue residence in Manhattan. He asks for the groom, John Willis, to be summoned. He is Harry Blair, a psychiatrist, and the sobriety of his appearance, speech, and manner lead to his acceptance. He recounts in a series of nested flashbacks a tale of how Willis’ fiancé and Blair's ex-wife, Nancy, is not only a kleptomaniac, inveterate liar, and murderer but is also unpunished for any of her crimes.

Apparently all her misdeeds result from her being falsely accused of stealing a family heirloom as a child. Blair recounts that Nancy first dates then splits up with an artist, Norman Clyde, who contacts Blair on the eve of the execution of the man convicted for a murder she committed and he helped conceal. Unaware of any of this until told by Clyde shortly into his hasty marriage to Nancy, Blair is skeptical and recommends Clyde seek counseling for his delusions. Instead Clyde jumps out a window of Blair’s upper story office.

Blair seeks to put the doubts Clyde sowed behind him, but finds his own reasons for questioning Nancy's veracity. When, five years into their marriage, he finally is faced with the truth of her serial thefts and compulsive deceits she has him fraudulently committed to a mental institution. Some unspecified time after divorcing him she becomes engaged to Willis.

It is unclear whether she recognizes he is the son of the woman who had accused her of thievery, and that her childhood bete noir is set to become her mother-in-law.

In spite of Blair's passion in recounting the details of the previous decade, an increasingly unsteady Willis remains determined to see the wedding through. The bridesmaids attend to Nancy as the ceremony nears.

Dressed in her gown and veil, Nancy is gifted a family keepsake passed down over three generations of Willis women - the same heart-shaped golden locket that had once been her childhood downfall, now affectionately clasped around her neck by the very same woman who had tormented her. Overwhelmed, she is beset by hallucinations of her sordid past and collapses physically and mentally during the wedding march. In the aftermath she is committed to a mental institution, with her ex-husband counseling her fiancé and his mother to show her both patience and compassion.

== Cast ==
- Laraine Day as Nancy Monks Blair Patton
- Brian Aherne as Dr. Harry Blair
- Robert Mitchum as Norman Clyde
- Gene Raymond as John Willis
- Sharyn Moffett as Nancy, age 10
- Ricardo Cortez as Drew Bonner
- Katherine Emery as Mrs. Willis
- Helene Thimig as Mrs. Monks
- Reginald Denny as Mr. Wendell
- Nella Walker as Mrs. Wendell
- Henry Stephenson as Lord Wyndham
- Lillian Fontaine as Lady Wyndham
- Myrna Dell as Thelma
- Wyndham Standing as Butler (uncredited)

== Background ==
- Hume Cronyn originally bought the Norma Barzman screenplay to produce and direct the film with his wife Jessica Tandy in the lead role, but later sold the rights to RKO Pictures, which then assigned Gibney to rewrite the screenplay. The original Barzman screenplay is in the Cronyn-Tandy papers at the Library of Congress.
- The interiors used for the house of Mrs. Willis appear to be the same as those used for the house of Alex Sebastian (Claude Rains) in Alfred Hitchcock's Notorious, released by RKO in September 1946.

== Reception ==
=== Critical response ===
When the film was released the staff at Variety magazine praised the film, writing, "Story carries the flashback technique to greater lengths than generally employed. The writing by Sheridan Gibney displays an understanding of the subject matter and proves a solid basis for the able performances achieved by John Brahm’s direction. Latter gears his scenes for full interest and carefully carries forward the doubt – and audience hope – that Nancy is not the villainess."

In 1992 film historians Alain Silver and Elizabeth Ward praised the unusual melodrama in the RKO visual style. "It is distinctive in its flashbacks within flashbacks, with the story often being told by a third or fourth person removed. This device is handled effectively in preparation for the climactic flashback, which reveals the truth."

Contemporary film critic Dennis Schwartz gave the film a mixed review in 2006, writing, "A psychological drama about a woman with a dark secret from her childhood that is carried over to her adult life. It's a post-war baroque melodrama, creaky as wooden steps in a mildewed house ... It was too wooden a presentation to generate anything but a few sparks ... It's a somber story, with a lot of heavy-handed things going on. The complexities of the heroine's character were well presented. The analyst's comments about her stealing to get even with Mrs. Willis seemed to be a reasonable explanation, if taken at face value ... The Locket only had some glitter but not enough substance. Though, as muddled as it was, it still kept me alert wanting to know what gives. The problem is I never satisfactorily found out what gives."
