= Paolo Barzman =

Canadian film and television director (born 1957)

- Born: April 9, 1957 (age 69); Cannes, France
- Education: University of California, Los Angeles (UCLA)
- Occupations: Film/television director and television writer
- Years active: 1983–present

Paolo Barzman (born April 9, 1957) is a French-Canadian film and television director and writer. He is the son of blacklisted screenwriters Ben and Norma Barzman, and grew up largely in Cannes after his parents left the United States.

== Career ==
=== Directing ===
His television directing credits include The Adventures of the Black Stallion, Highlander: The Series, Counterstrike, Bordertown, Relic Hunter, Queen of Swords, 15/Love, 18 to Life, Lost Girl, Haven, Wynonna Earp, the American-Canadian adaptation of Being Human and SurrealEstate, as well as a number of television films.

In 2007, he directed the feature film Emotional Arithmetic starring Susan Sarandon and Christopher Plummer.

He also directed the two-part miniseries The Phantom in 2009, based on the famous longtime costumed crime-fighting comic-strip character The Phantom.

=== Writing ===
As a television writer, he wrote for the series Grand Star and the French series Aventures Caraïbes.

== Awards ==
Award	Year	Category	Work	Result	Ref(s)
Gemini Awards	2006	Best Direction in a Children's or Youth Program or Series	15/Love: "Valley of the Dolls"	Won	
Gemini Awards	2009	Best Direction in a Dramatic Program or Mini-Series	The Last Templar	Nominated	
Gemini Awards	2011	Best Direction in a Dramatic Series	Being Human: "Dog Eat Dog"	Nominated	
Canadian Screen Awards	2025	Best TV Movie	Wynonna Earp: Vengeance with Emily Andras, Jordy Randall, Tom Cox, Brett Burlock, Sonia Hosko, Jess Maldaner	Won	
