= Katja of Sweden =

Swedish fashion designer (1920–2017)

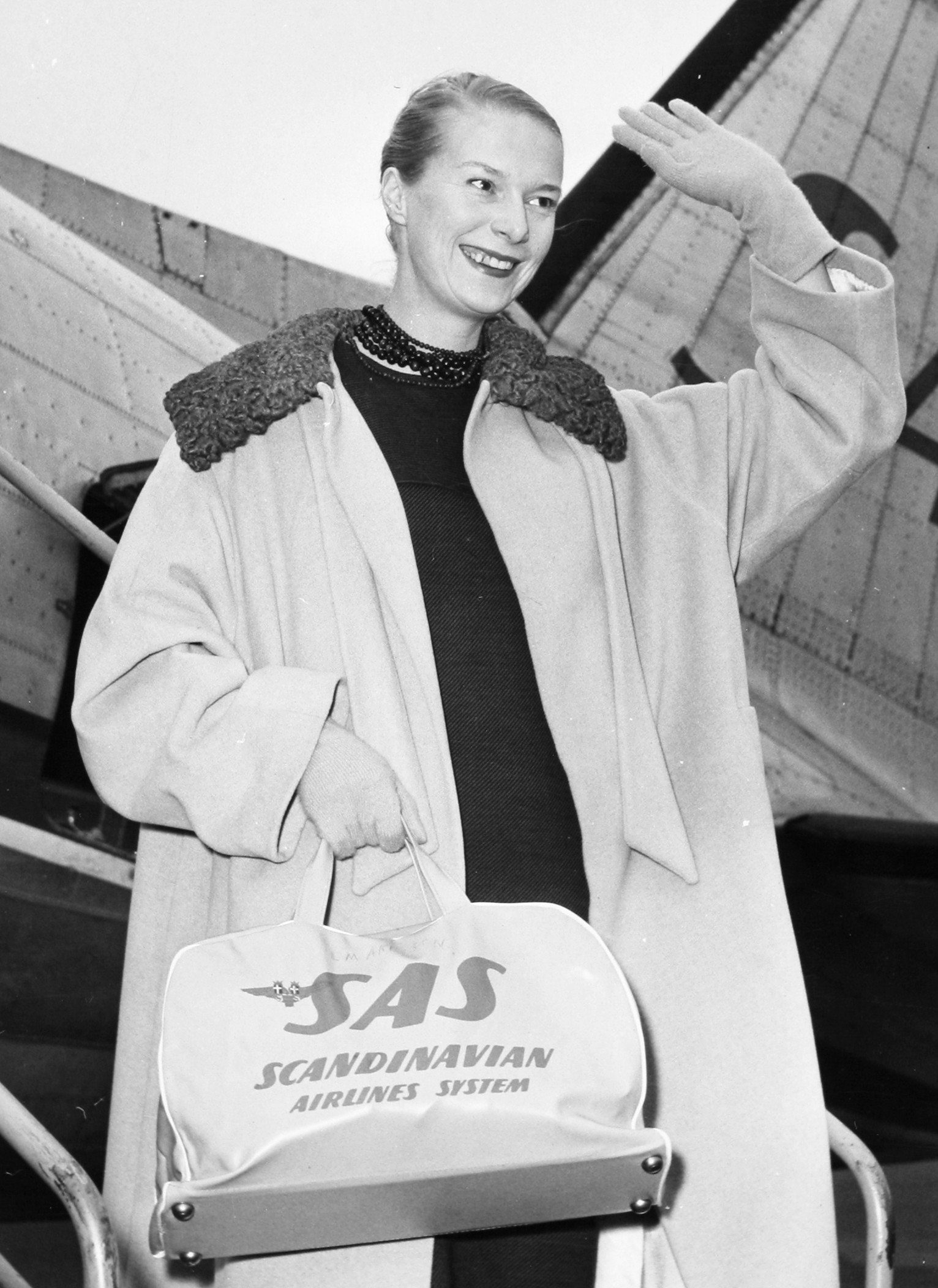
- Katja of Sweden, November 1957
- Born: Karin Ingegerd Hallberg; 12 January 1920; Ekeby, Bjuv, Sweden
- Died: 25 January 2017 (aged 97)
- Education: Konstfack, Beckmans, Parson's School of Design
- Known for: Fashion design

Katja Ingergard Geiger (née Hallberg; 12 January 1920 – 25 January 2017), better known as Katja of Sweden, was a Swedish fashion designer.

== Early life and career ==
After studying art and design at Konstfack and Beckmans in Stockholm, Sweden, Katja Hallberg moved to New York City in 1946 to study fashion design at Parson's School of Design.

There she married movie producer and director Rod E. Geiger who at the time was producing movies for Roberto Rossellini. The couple launched the Katja of Sweden brand in the late 1940s. Katja became close friends with Rosselini's wife Ingrid Bergman, and named a blouse after her that became a fashion hit.

She was the designer for Arthur Sportswear which used contractors including those in the Bronx which employed 50 seamstresses turning out her products. Being close friends with Charlie Chaplin, and Edward Dmytryk who was one of the Hollywood Ten, the Hollywood blacklist ordeal got Mr. Geiger in hot water.

The couple moved to Huaröd in Sweden in 1953, where the label "Katja of Sweden" became a fashion sensation which lasted for over twenty years. In 1975, they moved back to New York City, where she began designing home textiles, bed sheets, and kitchenware. "Katja shops" opened up in Macy's department store and Cannon Mills manufactured her designs under license. In the 1980s advertisements featuring Bob Hope and Larry Hagman sleeping in "Katja sheets" ran with the tagline "Two of the Most Famous Names in America Sleep Together"

In 1995, the Geigers moved back to Sweden to be closer to family. Rod Geiger died in 2000. Katja's clothes are now part of the permanent collection of the Museum Kulturen in Lund, Sweden. She died on 25 January 2017 at the age of 97.

== Awards ==
- 1950: US Designer of the Year
