= Huaröd =

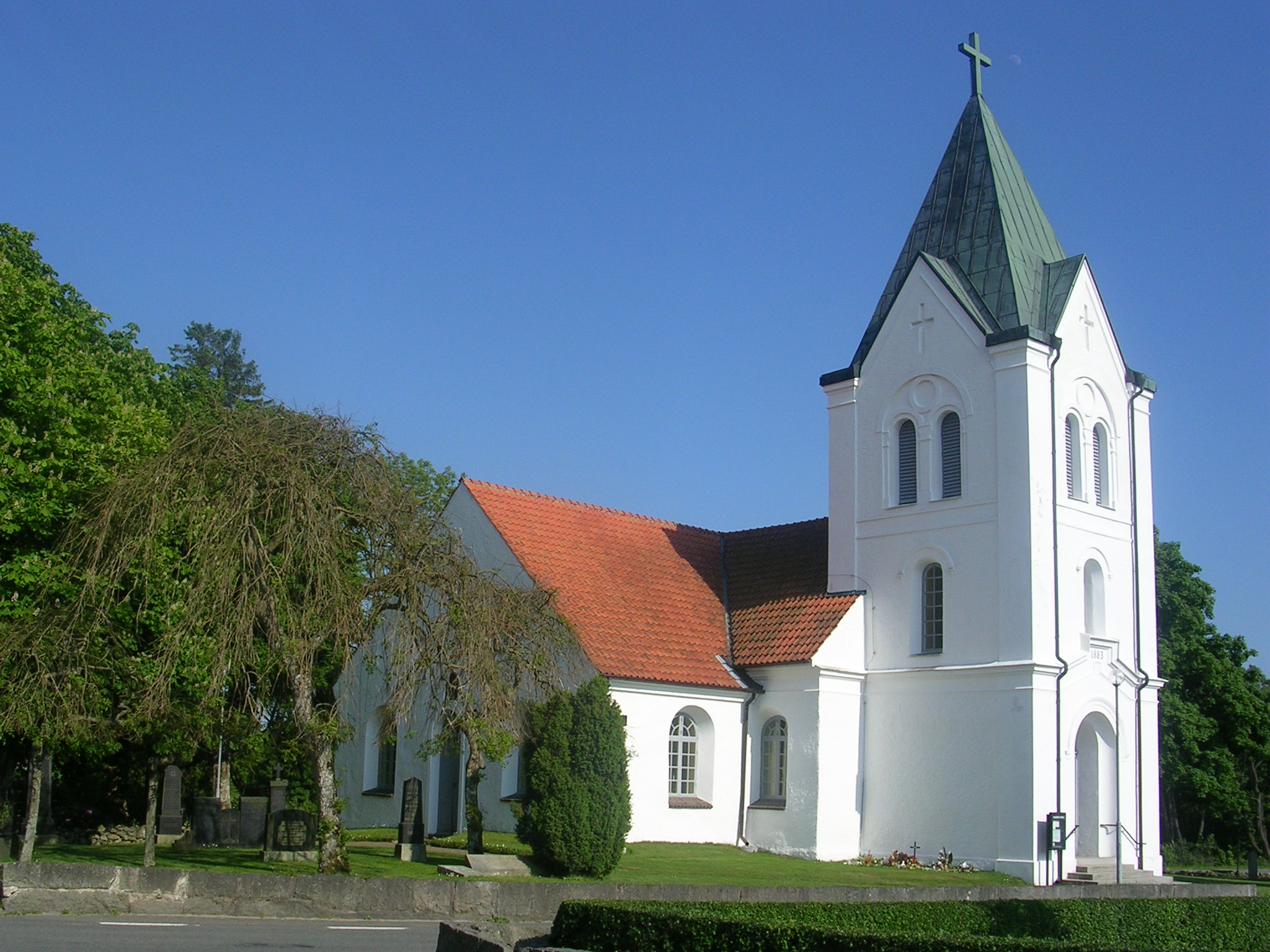
- Huaröd church

- Location within Skåne Location within Sweden
- Coordinates: 55°50′N 13°58′E
- Country: Sweden
- Province: Skåne
- County: Skåne County
- Municipality: Kristianstad Municipality

Area
  - Total: 0.45 km^{2} (0.17 sq mi)

Population (31 December 2010)
  - Total: 242
  - Density: 534/km^{2} (1,380/sq mi)
- Time zone: UTC+1 (CET)
  - Summer (DST): UTC+2 (CEST)

Huaröd is a locality situated in Kristianstad Municipality, Skåne County, Sweden with 242 inhabitants in 2010.

The village itself is located on Linderödsåsen about 30 kilometres south of Kristianstad and about 15 km from the coast.

Katja Geiger (Katja of Sweden), Carl-Adam Nycop, Mats Rondin and Geoff Bunn are some public figures who have chosen to live in Huaröd. It is also home to a chamber orchestra.
