= The Other (1947 film) =

1947 film

- Film poster
- Directed by: Carlo Ludovico Bragaglia
- Written by: Sergio Amidei; Carlo Ludovico Bragaglia; Aldo De Benedetti; Anton Giulio Majano; Guglielmo Morandi
- Starring: Blanchette Brunoy; Fosco Giachetti; Maria Michi
- Cinematography: Piero Portalupi
- Edited by: Roberto Cinquini
- Music by: Renzo Rossellini
- Production company: Excelsa Film
- Distributed by: Minerva Film
- Release date: 24 October 1947
- Running time: 88 minutes
- Country: Italy
- Language: Italian

The Other (Italian: L'altra) is a 1947 Italian crime melodrama film directed by Carlo Ludovico Bragaglia and starring Blanchette Brunoy, Fosco Giachetti and Maria Michi. It was an early example blending film noir and melodrama in Italian cinema. The film's sets were designed by the art director Gianni Mazzocca.

== Synopsis ==
A pre-war romance between an engineer and a woman leads to the birth of a son. Subsequently married to another man, a pianist, the old relationship comes back to impact the present with tragic results.

== Cast ==
- Blanchette Brunoy as Vera de Santis
- Fosco Giachetti as Pianista Marco de Santis
- Maria Michi as 'Angelo' Morelli
- Marcello Pagliero as Ing. Andrea Venturi
- Aristide Baghetti as Giovanni il Maggiordomo
- Pietro Carini as Carluccio de Santis
- Emilio Cigoli as Commissario
- Carlotta De la Croix as Governante di Carluccio
- Augusto Mastrantoni as Quaroni
- Livio Pavanelli as Impresario Francese

== Bibliography ==
- Bayman, Louis. The Operatic and the Everyday in Postwar Italian Film Melodrama. Edinburgh University Press, 2014.
- Chiti, Roberto & Poppi, Roberto. Dizionario del cinema italiano: Dal 1945 al 1959. Gremese Editore, 1991.
- Curti, Roberto. Italian Giallo in Film and Television: A Critical History. McFarland, 2022.
