= They Made Me a Fugitive =

1947 British film by Alberto Cavalcanti

- American release poster
- Directed by: Cavalcanti
- Written by: Noel Langley
- Based on: novel A Convict Has Escaped by Jackson Budd
- Produced by: Nat Bronstein
- Starring: Sally Gray; Trevor Howard; Griffith Jones; Rene Ray
- Cinematography: Otto Heller
- Edited by: Marjorie Saunders; Reginald Beck (sup)
- Music by: Marius-François Gaillard
- Production companies: A. R. Shipman Productions/ Alliance Films
- Distributed by: Warner Bros. Pictures
- Release dates: 24 June 1947 (UK); 6 March 1948 (US)
- Running time: 101 minutes
- Country: United Kingdom
- Language: English

They Made Me a Fugitive (also known as They Made Me a Criminal; U.S. title: I Became a Criminal) is a 1947 British black-and-white film noir directed by Alberto Cavalcanti and starring Sally Gray and Trevor Howard. It was written by Noel Langley, based on the 1941 Jackson Budd novel A Convict Has Escaped. Cinematography was by Otto Heller.

It is set in postwar England.

== Plot ==
Clem Morgan, demobilised from the Royal Air Force and unemployed after the war, helps in the stealing and transporting of black market goods in coffins to crime boss Narcy's (short for Narcissus) headquarters in a funeral parlour. Clem finds the activity harmless enough, until one day he finds drugs in the latest coffin. Clem objects and tells his girlfriend, Ellie, that he will quit after one last job that night, the looting of a warehouse. Narcy betrays him, triggering the burglar alarm while he is inside. Clem manages to get back in the car with Narcy and another member of the gang, Soapy, before they drive off. When Narcy orders Soapy to run down a policeman, Clem grabs the wheel in an unsuccessful attempt to save the man's life and the car crashes into a lamppost. Narcy knocks him unconscious and has him moved to the driver's seat before fleeing with Soapy. Inspector Rockliffe arrives on the scene with other police officers to find the police officer dead and Clem injured in the car.

Clem is convicted of manslaughter and sentenced to fifteen years in prison in HM Prison Dartmoor. Sally Connor, Narcy's girlfriend, visits him in prison, telling him that Narcy is now with Ellie (who has not visited Morgan in prison) and that she knows he was framed as she was told so by Cora, Soapy's girlfriend. Sally offers to try to persuade Soapy to give evidence but Clem tells her to go away.

Back in London, Sally tells Cora that she has seen Clem and wants to go and speak to Soapy to get him to tell the police what really happened, but Narcy has found out that Sally has gone to see Clem in prison and brutally beats her up.

Clem escapes from prison and the police start a manhunt for him. He seeks shelter in a remote farmhouse, where Mrs Fenshaw lets him bathe, shave and change his clothes, and also cooks him some food. Mr Fenshaw comes into the room, but turns out to be a hopeless drunk who is hardly aware of his surroundings. Mrs Fenshaw then tries to get Clem to shoot her husband, stating that as he is already a murderer it won't make any difference to him. Clem refuses and leaves, but he has handled the gun, leaving his fingerprints on it, and Mrs Fenshaw uses it to shoot her husband dead.

Clem is now wanted for the murder of Mr Fenshaw as well, but makes his way back to London and goes to stay with Sally; he then manages to escape both the police and Narcy, but Sally is kidnapped by Narcy and his gang and taken to their hideout, where Cora is already being held. Cora is forced to tell Narcy where Soapy is hiding out (in a room in a rundown hotel nearby) and Narcy sends Jim to go and kill Soapy, which he does.

Clem, whilst trying to find Cora and Soapy, is caught by Rockliffe, who tells him that he is not convinced by Mrs Fenshaw's story, the first indication that the police might believe in Clem's innocence. In order to use him as bait, Rockliffe lets Clem go, and he goes to the Valhalla funeral parlour to meet Narcy's gang. After knocking other members of the gang out, Clem and Narcy end up fighting on the roof of the parlour, before Narcy falls to the ground. Rockliffe, Sally and Clem gather round, begging Narcy, who is dying, to tell the truth about who killed the policeman, but Narcy sticks to his story and repeats that it was Clem, before dying. As officers usher Jim, Bert and Clem into police cars, Clem's prospects appear bad but not entirely hopeless. Sally tries but is unable to get either Jim or Bert to say Soapy was to blame (Bert says, "Fat chance they'd believe me"), and Clem himself is fatalistic, telling Sally to forget about him. But Rockliffe says, "It's all right Miss Connor. We'll get all the facts before we're through," and he tells Clem, "We get any fresh evidence we can always submit your case to the Home Secretary you know".

== Cast ==
- Sally Gray as Sally
- Trevor Howard as Clem Morgan
- Griffith Jones as Narcy
- Rene Ray as Cora
- Mary Merrall as Aggie
- Charles Farrell as Curley
- Cyril Smith as Bert
- Phyllis Robins as Olga
- Vida Hope as Mrs Fenshaw
- Eve Ashley as Ellen
- Jack McNaughton as Soapy
- Maurice Denham as Mr Fenshaw
- Ballard Berkeley as Inspector Rockliffe
- Michael Brennan as Jim
- Bill O'Connor as Bill
- Lyn Evans as lorry driver
- John Penrose as Shawney
- Derek Birch as PC Murray
- Peter Bull as Fidgity Phil
- Gordon Court as Sergeant
- Enid Cruickshank as Club Hostess
- Sebastian Cabot as Club Proprietor
- Ida Patlanski as Soho girl
- Howard Douglas as Chief Warder
- Sam Kydd as Eddie (uncredited)

== Reception ==
=== Box office ===
According to trade papers, the film was a "notable box office attraction" at British cinemas in 1947.

=== Critical ===
The Monthly Film Bulletin wrote: "The film's makers seem to have determined to out-Hollywood Hollywood in sordid sensationalism, and there seems nothing to be said in favour of this fulfilment of their ambition. The degradation and violent beating-up of women as witnessed in the film may possibly serve some useful purpose if it should act as a deterrent to foolish girls who may be potential victims of this country's ever-increasing band of criminals, but can scarcely be regarded as enjoyable entertainment. Trevor Howard, as Morgan, is adequate in the part, but though starred is completely outshone by Griffith Jones, who steps right out of the ranks of second-grade heroes to give quite an impressive performance as the villainous Narcy. The ladies of the cast struggle gamely to perform their unedifying roles with some appearance of conviction but with no resounding success. Some of the most heavily dramatic moments and one or two ill-timed gags evoked ominous tittering from the audience."

"Artfully sculpted and suspenseful," wrote TV Guide, "They Made me a Fugitive makes for gripping, adult cinema."
