= Dots Johnson =

American actor

Hylan Johnson (February 3, 1913 – August 22, 1986), professionally known as Dots Johnson, .'s Johnson, and Dotts Johnson, was an American stage and film actor. He was best known for his roles as the American MP in Roberto Rossellini's 1946 film Paisan and as the boxing manager in the 1953 film The Joe Louis Story.

== Filmography ==
Year	Title	Role	Notes
1946	Paisan	Joe - the American MP	(episode II: Napoli)
1947	Reet, Petite, and Gone	Michaels	
1950	No Way Out	Lefty Jones	
1953	The Joe Louis Story	Julian Black	
1971	The Grissom Gang	Johnny Hutchins	
1973	Thirty Dangerous Seconds		
