= You're a Lucky Fellow, Mr. Smith =

1943 film by Felix E. Feist

- Directed by: Felix E. Feist
- Written by: Ben Barzman; Louis Lantz; Lawrence Riley
- Based on: story by Oscar Brodney
- Starring: Allan Jones
- Production company: Universal
- Release date: 1943
- Running time: 63mins
- Country: United States
- Language: English

You're a Lucky Fellow, Mr Smith is a 1943 American musical film directed by Felix E. Feist and starring Allan Jones, Evelyn Ankers and Billie Burke.

== Plot ==
A woman marries a man to fulfill the conditions of a will.

== Cast ==
- Allan Jones as Tony Smith
- Evelyn Ankers as Lynn Crandall Smith
- Billie Burke as Aunt Harriet
- David Bruce as Harvey Jones
- Patsy O'Connor as Peggy Crandall
- Stanley Clements as Squirt
- Luis Alberni as Goreni
- Francis Pierlot as Doc Webster
- Harry Hayden as Judge
- Mantan Moreland as Porter
- Emory Parnell as Conductor
- The King's Men
