= Rod E. Geiger =

American film director

Rod E. Geiger (1915–2000) was an American movie producer and director, Instrumental for his contributions to Italian Neorealism, working with Federico Fellini and Roberto Rossellini. Credited in the book "The Adventures of Roberto Rossellini, by Tag Gallagher" as the man who more than any single individual was to make Rossellini and the new Italian cinema famous around the world. He was also known for his marriage to Katja of Sweden, a Swedish fashion designer.

He was born Roland Ernest Geiger in New York City in 1915 and died in Tollarp, Sweden, 2000.

== Filmography ==
- Give Us This Day (1949)
- Paisan (1946)
- Rome, Open City (1945)
