= Never Say Goodbye (1946 film) =

1946 film by James V. Kern

- Theatrical release poster
- Directed by: James V. Kern
- Written by: I.A.L. Diamond; James V. Kern; Lewis R. Foster
- Story by: Ben Barzman; Norma Barzman
- Produced by: William Jacobs
- Starring: Errol Flynn; Eleanor Parker; Lucile Watson
- Cinematography: Arthur Edeson
- Edited by: Folmar Blangsted
- Music by: Friedrich Hollaender
- Color process: Black and white
- Production company: Warner Bros. Pictures
- Distributed by: Warner Bros. Pictures
- Release date: November 9, 1946
- Running time: 97 minutes
- Country: United States
- Language: English
- Budget: $1,011,000
- Box office: $2,603,000

Never Say Goodbye is a 1946 American romantic comedy film directed by James V. Kern and starring Errol Flynn, Eleanor Parker, and Lucile Watson. Produced and distributed by Warner Bros. Pictures, it is about a divorced couple and the daughter who works to bring them back together. It was Errol Flynn's first purely comedic role since Footsteps in the Dark.

== Plot ==
Divorced New York couple Phil and Ellen Gayley each buy a winter coat for their seven-year-old daughter Phillippa, known as "Flip". Flip has spent the last six months with her father, but is about to move in with her mother for six months, according to their shared custody arrangement. Flip adores her father, who charms her with whimsical stunts and play-acting, such as escorting her as "Robin Hood" (an allusion to Errol Flynn's famous role) to her mother's home astride a New York police officer's horse to console Flip at their parting. When Phil delivers Flip to her mother, Flip receives the two coats and points out that they need to coordinate better, pleading with her parents to reconcile since during her six-month's stay with each she misses the other parent.

Phil asks Ellen to dinner at Luigi's, their favorite restaurant, to attempt a reconciliation, and Ellen once again begins to fall under Phil's charm. Unfortunately, Phil, a successful artist, has forgotten a previous date with his current girlfriend/model, Nancy Graham, who turns up for their date at Luigi's, complicating matters. With proprietor Luigi's help, Phil tries to juggle both women, but Nancy and Ellen each discover that they are not the only date and leave in a huff.

On Christmas Eve, Phil dresses up as Santa Claus to sneak into Ellen's apartment and see his daughter. Ellen assumes he is her divorce lawyer, Rex De Vallon, who earlier agreed to play Santa. When Rex arrives, Phil locks him in the bathroom and a fight ensues. Ellen then insists Phil stay away from Flip for the next six months.

Still attempting a reconciliation, Phil manages to persuade Ellen and Flip to go away together to a rural cabin in Connecticut that is owned by his friend, Jack Gordon. However, Jack turns up with his fiancée and Nancy, ruining the trip.

Meanwhile, Flip has been writing letters to Fenwick Lonkowski, a Marine, pretending to be older than she is, and sending him a picture of Ellen instead of one of herself. A tall, attractive Fenwick arrives to have lunch with Flip and assumes Ellen is her. After Flip explains the situation to her mother, Ellen decides to let Fenwick think she has been writing to him all along and flirt with Fenwick to get revenge on Phil. A jealous Phil pretends to be Flip's uncle―his own brother―to impede Fenwick's courting of Ellen while "advising" Fenwick on how to win his "sister-in-law" on the premise that it would be hard for any man to compete with the memory of Ellen's "extraordinary" ex-husband.

Eventually Phil tells Fenwick that Flip wrote the letters and that he is Ellen's ex-husband. When Fenwick learns how much Flip wants her parents to reunite, he decides to help her. Fenwick takes Flip to Luigi's, and she refuses to return unless her parents make up. Ellen finally agrees to take Phil back, and Fenwick consoles himself with Luigi's hatcheck girl. On their second honeymoon, Phil and Ellen receive a telegram from Flip asking them to provide her with a brother.

== Cast ==
- Errol Flynn as Phil Gayley
- Eleanor Parker as Ellen Gayley
- Lucile Watson as Mrs. Hamilton
- S. Z. Sakall as Luigi
- Forrest Tucker as Corporal Fenwick Lonkowski
- Donald Woods as Rex DeVallon
- Peggy Knudsen as Nancy Graham
- Tom D'Andrea as Jack Gordon
- Hattie McDaniel as Cozy
- Patti Brady as Phillippa "Flip" Gayley
- Charles Coleman as Withers
- Arthur Shields as McCarthy
- Jane Harker as Mary Scott
- Helen Pender as Louise
- Paula Drew as Barbara
- Sam McDaniel as Porter
- Monte Blue as Policeman
- Tom Tyler as Policeman

== Production ==
The film was originally known as Don't Ever Leave Me and was based on an original story by Norma and Ben Barzman. The idea was Norma Barzman's and she worked on it with her husband Ben. It was purchased by Warner Bros. Pictures in June 1944 as a vehicle for Claire Foley, who had appeared in the play Janie, which had just been acquired by Warners for filming. Jesse L. Lasky was assigned to produce. Then in September, it was announced William Jacobs would produce instead. According to Norma Barzman, Warner Bros insisted Ben Barzman work on the script with S.K. Lauren rather than her.

The project remained in development until June 1945, when it was announced that Errol Flynn would star. Flynn had been set to star in two action films, Adventures of Don Juan and The Frontiersman, but both had been postponed. (Don Juan was shot some years later; The Frontiersman - postponed because "of the wartime travel problem, many location sequences being necessary for the story" - was never made.) The article mentioned that the plot of Don't Ever Leave Me was about a young girl who sends a photo of her widowed mother to a serviceman, which was also the plot of another film going to be made at Columbia around this time, Dear Mr Private. James Kern was assigned to direct.

Eleanor Parker was allocated the female lead opposite Flynn. Newcomer Patti Brady was given the role of their daughter. Forrest Tucker was borrowed from Columbia to play his role. He later signed a long-term contract with Warners.

In July 1945 the title was changed to Never Say Goodbye.

Filming took place in August 1945.

For the scene in which Phil puts on a "tough guy" front to intimidate Fenwick, Humphrey Bogart (uncredited) overdubbed Flynn's dialogue.

== Reception ==
=== Box office ===
According to Variety by January 1948 the film earned $1,770,000 in rentals in North America. It had admissions of 1,180,998 in France and earned £116,821 in England.

According to Warner Bros ledgers, the film earned $1,817,000 domestically and $786,000 overseas.

=== Critical ===
The Los Angeles Times criticized the lack of originality in the comic set pieces: "director James V. Kern has had to borrow just about every situation in the book just to keep going" but said "Flynn goes through the motions with more good nature than you might expect" and that Parker was "lovely, unaffected".

The New York Times critic Bosley Crowther wrote that "considering the interference provided him by the script, he [Errol Flynn] is handling the novel assignment in a moderately entertaining style... it is a silly little fable... Mr. Flynn's unaccustomed performance is not likely to win him a palm as Hollywood's most accomplished farceur, but it does have amusing points—especially when he endeavors to pose as a tough guy with Humphrey Bogart's voice, and Eleanor Parker is remarkably attractive and encouraging as his obviously reluctant ex-wife. S. Z. Sakall, too, is amusing as a friendly restaurateur, but deliver us, please, from Patti Brady, a lisping youngster who plays the tottling child."

Filmink magazine later wrote that "No one much talks about this movie these days, but it’s fun and charming with the star in terrific form, playing a father for the first time in his career."
