= Maria Michi =

Italian actress

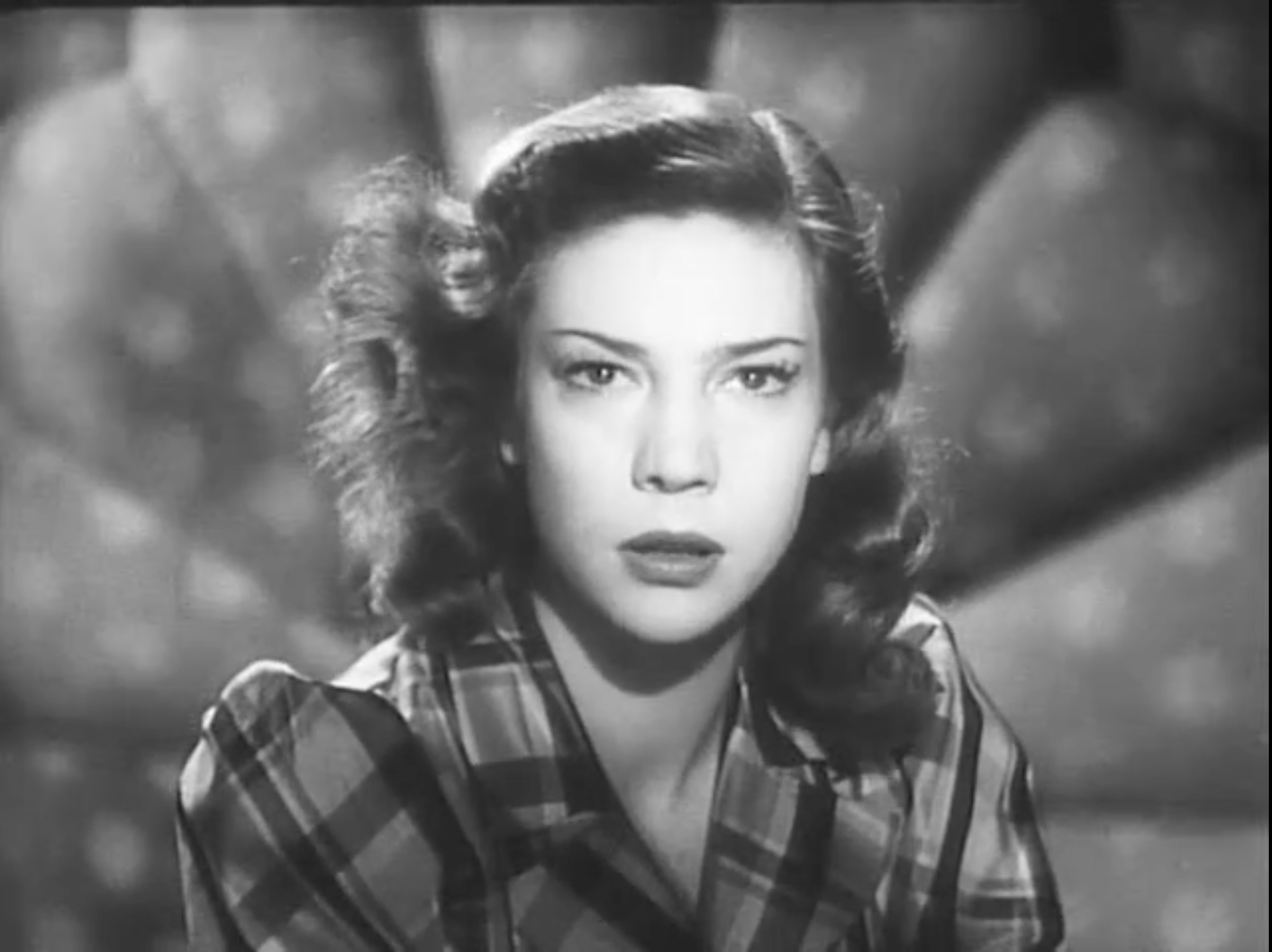
- Michi in the movie Rome, Open City (1945)
- Born: 24 May 1921; Rome, Kingdom of Italy
- Died: 7 April 1980 (aged 58); Grottaferrata, Rome, Italy
- Occupation: Actress

Maria Michi (24 May 1921 – 7 April 1980) was an Italian supporting actress who worked with Roberto Rossellini on his two early neorealism films: Rome, Open City and Paisà.

Michi worked first as a typist at a law firm, then as an usherette at Teatro Quattro Fontane in Rome. She was noticed and given small parts in the company of Sergio Tofano and Diana Torrieri during the 1942–1943 season. Critic Irene Bignardi called her "a woman very near the resistance and the Communist Party". In 1948, she worked with Christian-Jaque in La Chartreuse de Parme. She was married in September 1949 to Duke Augusto Torlonia, and left the world of cinema for the theater, particularly working with director Guido Salvini. The marriage was annulled in San Marino in 1956. She resumed her film career in the 1960s and 1970s, when she did 12 films, including Bernardo Bertolucci's Last Tango in Paris and Tinto Brass's Salon Kitty, her last film.

== Filmography ==
- 1945: Roma, città aperta (directed by Roberto Rossellini) - Marina Marini
- 1946: Paisà (Paisan) (directed by Roberto Rossellini) - Francesca
- 1947: Fatalità (directed by Giorgio Bianchi) - Paola
- 1947: The Other (directed by Carlo Ludovico Bragaglia) - Thea 'Angelo' Morelli
- 1947: Preludio d'amore (Shamed) (directed by Giovanni Paolucci) - Alida
- 1947: La Chartreuse de Parme (The Charterhouse of Parma) (directed by Christian-Jaque) - Marietta
- 1961: Legge di guerra (Law of War) (directed by Bruno Paolinell) - Signora Macumer
- 1969: The Lady of Monza, (original title is La monaca di Monza") (directed by Eriprando Visconti) - Sister Bianca Homati
- 1970: The Breach (directed by Claude Chabrol) - La troisième parque
- 1970: Mont-Dragon (directed by Jean Valère) - Hortense Dubois - la femme d'Armand
- 1972: What Have You Done to Solange? (directed by Massimo Dallamano) - Brenda's mother (uncredited)
- 1972: Last Tango in Paris (directed by Bernardo Bertolucci) - Rosa's mother
- 1973: Redneck (directed by Silvio Narizzano) - Princess
- 1973: Blu Gang e vissero per sempre felici e ammazzati (directed by Luigi Bazzoni) - Mama Blue
- 1975: Down the Ancient Staircase (directed by Mauro Bolognini) - Folle
- 1975: Irene, Irene (directed by Peter Del Monte) - Maria
- 1976: Salon Kitty (directed by Tinto Brass) - Ilde
