= Giuseppe Morosini =

Italian priest and partisan

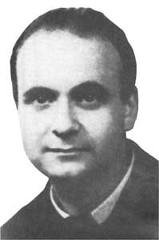
- Born: March 19, 1913; Ferentino, Italy
- Died: April 13, 1944 (aged 31); Rome, Italy
- Occupations: presbyter and partisan

Giuseppe Morosini (19 March 1913 – 13 April 1944) was an Italian priest and partisan. He was ordained to the sacred priesthood in 1937 at St. John Lateran's Basilica, becoming chaplain of the Royal Italian Army's 4th Artillery Regiment in 1941, but was transferred to the city of Rome in 1941 to help with youths who were displaced by the war. He soon joined the Italian resistance movement. He was arrested by the Gestapo and imprisoned, tortured and, despite pressure from the Vatican, executed.

He received a posthumous medal, a plaza in Rome was named after him, and Italy issued a postage stamp in his honor in 1997. In the movie "Rome, Open City" by Roberto Rossellini the character of Don Pietro, the priest who assists the Italian Resistance and is later captured and murdered by the Nazis was based on the life of Fr. Morosini.
