= Finishing School (1953 film) =

French-Italian comedy film by Bernard Vorhaus

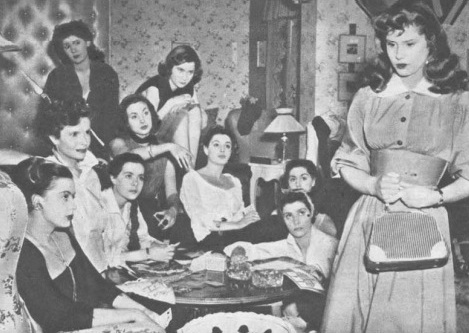
- A scene from the filme
- Directed by: Bernard Vorhaus
- Written by: Norma Barzman; Ennio Flaiano
- Produced by: Valentino Trevisaneto
- Starring: Susan Stephen; Anna Maria Ferrero; Jacques Sernas
- Cinematography: Piero Portalupi
- Edited by: Gabriele Varriale
- Music by: Nino Rota
- Production companies: Riviera Films; Società Italiana Cines
- Distributed by: United Artists
- Release date: 24 January 1953
- Running time: 100 minutes
- Countries: France; Italy
- Language: Italian

Finishing School (Italian: Fanciulle di lusso) is a 1953 French-Italian comedy film directed by Bernard Vorhaus and starring Susan Stephen, Anna Maria Ferrero and Jacques Sernas. It was made at Cinecittà with sets designed by the art director Franco Lolli. It is also known by the alternative title of Luxury Girls.

== Plot ==
After finishing her studies, an American, Susan Miller, spends a vacation period in Rome with her parents. Her father, a wealthy man who led a dissipated life, sent her to complete her worldly education at the famous college of Mont-Fleuri, Switzerland.

== Cast ==
- Susan Stephen as Lorna Whitmore
- Anna Maria Ferrero as Valerie De Beranger
- Jacques Sernas as Jean-Jacques
- Steve Barclay as George Whitmore
- Marina Vlady as Eljay
- Brunella Bovo as Jeannie Gordon
- Rossana Podestà as Pereira
- Elisa Cegani as Madame Charpentier
- Claudio Gora as Professor Charpentier
- Estelle Brody as Mrs. Whitmore
- Lawrence Ward as Greg Wilson
- Paola Mori as Beejay
- Roberto Risso as Steve
- Eva Vanicek as Statistician
- Vera Palumbo as Knitter
- Anna Casini as Albino
- Colette Laurent as Boopie
- Bianca Manenti as Maid
- Charles Rutherford as Jean-Jacques' friend
- Mary Alcaide as Ballet Mistress
- Liana Del Balzo as Princess De Vick-Beranger
- Franco Lodi as Riding Instructor
- Leopoldo Savona as Boyfriend of Val
- Luisella Boni
- Giovanna Pala
- Roberta Primavera

== Bibliography ==
- Heiko Feldner, Claire Gorrara & Kevin Passmore. The Lost Decade? The 1950s in European History, Politics, Society and Culture. Cambridge Scholars Publishing, 2010.
