= N.A. Bronsten =

American film producer (1904–1975)

- Born: Nathan Bronsten; 25 May 1904
- Died: 1975 (aged 70–71); Essex, England
- Occupations: Writer; producer

Nathan Bronsten (1904–1975), or Nathan Bronstein was a Russian-born British writer and producer. He trained as an engineer.

== Select films ==
- They Made Me a Fugitive (1947)
- Master of Bankdam (1947)
- Brass Monkey (1948)
- Silent Dust (1949)
- The Hidden Room (1949) aka Obsession
- Give Us This Day (1949)
- Valley of the Eagles (1951)
