= Valley of Eagles =

- Original British cinema poster
- Directed by: Terence Young
- Written by: Terence Young
- Story by: Nat A. Bronstein; Paul Tabori
- Produced by: Nat A. Bronstein
- Starring: Jack Warner; Nadia Gray; John McCallum
- Cinematography: Harry Waxman
- Edited by: Lito Carruthers
- Music by: Nino Rota
- Production company: Independent Sovereign Films
- Distributed by: General Film Distributors (UK); Lippert Pictures (US)
- Release dates: 26 September 1951 (UK); 25 April 1952 (US)
- Running time: 86 minutes
- Country: United Kingdom
- Language: English
- Budget: £136,113

Valley of Eagles (U.S. title Valley of the Eagles) is a 1951 British thriller film directed by Terence Young and starring Jack Warner, Nadia Gray and John McCallum. The screenplay was written by Young based on a story by Nat A. Bronstein and Paul Tabori. It concerns Swedish scientist Dr. Nils Ahlen, whose crucial new invention is stolen by his wife Helga, who tries to take it to the Soviet Union.

== Plot ==
The setting is Stockholm, Sweden, "this year". Dr Nils Ahlen, working at the Institute of Technical Research, is about to leave his home to give a talk at Uppsala University on his new invention and he discusses arrangements for his absence with his assistant, Sven Nystrom. Nystrom intends to work from home, but Ahlen shows him where he has hidden the key to his laboratory "just in case". While they are talking, Ahlen's wife, Helga, complains that the couple will miss a dinner engagement with friends. Ahlen tells her she could go on her own and Helga replies that she could.

At Uppsala University, Ahlen's demonstration of his invention creates enormous interest, not the least from a colonel in the Swedish Army. It is a device which allows huge amounts of energy to be stored, as audio recordings, on barium discs. When played back, the discs release enough power to fuel a small town or "propel a rocket or flying bomb across the Atlantic". Naturally, the military are interested in this and request that Ahlen provide them with the specifications for his recorder "by yesterday".

Returning home from Uppsala, Ahlen finds his apartment disturbed and his wife and the key to his laboratory both missing. A search of the lab reveals that the vital components of the recorder have been stolen. He alerts the police and the head of his institute, and an investigation begins. Ahlen, however, soon becomes impatient with the attitude of police inspector Peterson and, having established that his assistant Nystom is also missing, begins an investigation of his own. This takes him to a rendezvous with the mysterious baroness Erland in Karlstad, with whom Nystrom has been in correspondence. Erland denies all knowledge of Nystrom, although she answers to the description of a frequent visitor that Nystrom has had. As Ahlen is leaving her house, the Erland's manservant tells her she has a call from Leksand.

Peterson has also traced the trail to Erland, and meets up with Ahlen in his car. The two agree to work together. They find out that a plane has been forced to make a landing at Leksand and that Nystrom and Helga were on board. The pair are obviously heading north for the border with Finland in Swedish Lapland, presumably to take the invention to the Soviet Union, although this is never made explicit. The action then switches between Ahlen and Peterson and Nystrom and Helga in their race for the border. When a blizzard begins, Ahlen remarks that the weather is visited on the just and unjust alike and then wonders which of them is which.

The chase takes all four protagonists into the territory of the local Sami people, referred to here as Lapps. Nystrom and Helga have hired three Sami as guides, while Ahlen and Peterson join a large family group who are taking their reindeer across the border. Right from the start, the presence of Ahlen and Peterson causes discord amongst the Sami, many of whom regard them as bad luck and resent the distraction of involving themselves in the chase, but their leader, named Anders, is supportive of Ahlen and Peterson and persuades the rest to accept them.

Nystrom and Helga lay a false trail which leads Ahlen's group over a cliff, destroying their reindeer herd. Anders takes his own life out of remorse and the group disbands. Ahlen and Peterson are left with a small group led by the young Sami woman Kara Niemann. When Ahlen and Peterson criticise the "savagery" of the Lapp culture, Kara defends it and reveals that she is the granddaughter of Anders. Ahlen warms to her and the two begin to fall in love. However, Kara's group is soon in deep trouble, as they have attracted the attention of two different packs of wolves and lack the firepower to defend themselves. Just all seems lost, one of their party spots a group of birds circling overhead. One of them descends and kills a wolf. It is an eagle, controlled by one of a group of Sami hunters. More birds descend and the wolves are driven off.

The group is taken to the eagle hunters' village in "the hidden valley", a kind of local Shangri-La. The valley is a refuge, but is under constant threat of avalanches from the mountains which overhang it. This is why the hunters hunt with eagles and why the children in the village can never laugh or play. Nystrom and Helga are also here and Peterson places them both under arrest. Ahlen talks to Helga, who reveals her motives to have been loneliness and frustration. She mocks him for caring more about glass tubes and wires than about flesh and blood. Ahlen feels guilty and begs Peterson to let the pair go free. Peterson refuses, but there is a strong suggestion that he will "turn a blind eye". Before any plan can be made, however, Nystrom takes matters into his own hands, and he and Helga attempt to escape by crossing the mountains above the village. Fearing an avalanche, the locals give chase with their eagles. Peterson and Ahlen try to persuade Nystrom to turn back but he fires at them, starting an avalanche which kills the fugitives but spares the village. The locals reflect that they have been needlessly living in fear for generations and Ahlen and Niemann are free to enjoy their newfound love.

== Cast ==
- Jack Warner as Inspector Peterson
- Nadia Gray as Kara Niemann
- John McCallum as Doctor Nils Åhlén
- Anthony Dawson as Sven Nyström
- Mary Laura Wood as Helga Åhlén
- Naima Wifstrand as Baroness Erland
- Norman MacOwan as Ferry Pilot
- Alfred Maurstad as Trerik
- Martin Boddey as Chief of the Lost Valley
- Fritiof Billquist as Colonel Strand
- Christopher Lee as Detective Holt
- Ewen Solon as Detective Anderson
- Peter Blitz as Anders
- Gösta Cederlund as Professor Lind
- Sten Lindgren as Director-General

== Production ==
While most interiors were shot at Pinewood Studios and Denham Film Studios outside London, the exterior scenes were done in Stockholm and Swedish Lapland. A number of Swedish actors participated in supporting roles.

Part of the finance came from two rubber merchants, Colonels Weil and Prior.

== Reception ==
The Monthly Film Bulletin wrote: "Valley of Eagles combines some authentic and potentially interesting Scandinavian location material with a stereotyped chase story which is never satisfactorily integrated with it. ... The film contains a single impressive moment: the first strange sight of the hunters with their eagles held high before them on poles. For the rest, the stampede and avalanche fall short of their intended effect as spectacular excitements, while the original battle of wolves and eagles was considered too violent by the censor and has been reduced to a very bloodless contest. Valley of Eagles proves, if proof were needed, that authenticity and excitement must stem from plot and characters and cannot be ensured merely by setting a banal story in interesting scenery."

In The Radio Times Guide to Films Adrian Turner gave the film 2/5 stars, writing: "There are really three films here: a wildlife adventure, a Cold War thriller and a standard issue cop yarn complete with Jack Warner. ... Ambitious for what is really a B-movie."
