= Frank Fleming (Gaelic footballer) =

Irish Gaelic footballer

Frank Fleming was a Gaelic footballer who played for the Mayo county team in their cup-winning season. He started Champion Fire Defences after retiring from the league.
