= Rome, Open City =

1945 Italian war drama film

- Theatrical release poster
- Italian: Roma città aperta
- Directed by: Roberto Rossellini
- Screenplay by: Sergio Amidei; Federico Fellini
- Story by: Sergio Amidei
- Produced by: Giuseppe Amato; Ferruccio De Martino; Roberto Rossellini; Rod E. Geiger
- Starring: Aldo Fabrizi
- Cinematography: Ubaldo Arata
- Edited by: Eraldo Da Roma
- Music by: Renzo Rossellini
- Distributed by: Minerva Film (Italy); Joseph Burstyn & Arthur Mayer (U.S.)
- Release date: 27 September 1945
- Running time: 105 minutes
- Country: Italy
- Languages: Italian; German
- Box office: $1 million (US Rentals) $3 million (US)

Rome, Open City (Italian: Roma città aperta), also released as Open City, is a 1945 Italian neorealist war drama film directed by Roberto Rossellini and co-written by Sergio Amidei, Celeste Negarville and Federico Fellini. Set in Rome in 1944, the film follows a diverse group of characters coping under the Nazi occupation, and centers on a Resistance fighter trying to escape the city with the help of a Catholic priest. The title refers to the status of Rome as an open city following its declaration as such on 14 August 1943. The film is the first in Rosselini's "Neorealist Trilogy", followed by Paisan (1946) and Germany, Year Zero (1948).

Open City is considered one of the most important and representative works of Italian neorealism, and an important stepping stone for Italian filmmaking as a whole. It was one of the first post-war Italian pictures to gain major acclaim and accolades internationally, winning the prestigious Palme d'Or at the 1946 Cannes Film Festival and being nominated for Best Adapted Screenplay Oscar at the 19th Academy Awards. It launched director Rosselini, screenwriter Fellini, and actress Anna Magnani into the international spotlight.

In 2008, the film was included on the Italian Ministry of Cultural Heritage’s 100 Italian films to be saved, a list of 100 films that "have changed the collective memory of the country between 1942 and 1978".

== Plot ==
In 1944, on the eve of Rome's liberation by the Allies, communist and local leader of the Italian Resistance Luigi Ferraris (hiding under the alias of engineer Giorgio Manfredi) eludes capture by the SS. He takes refuge at the home of Francesco, another resistance fighter. With the help of Francesco's pregnant fiancée Pina, Luigi contacts Don Pietro, a Catholic priest, who helps deliver money and messages to a group of partisans outside the city.

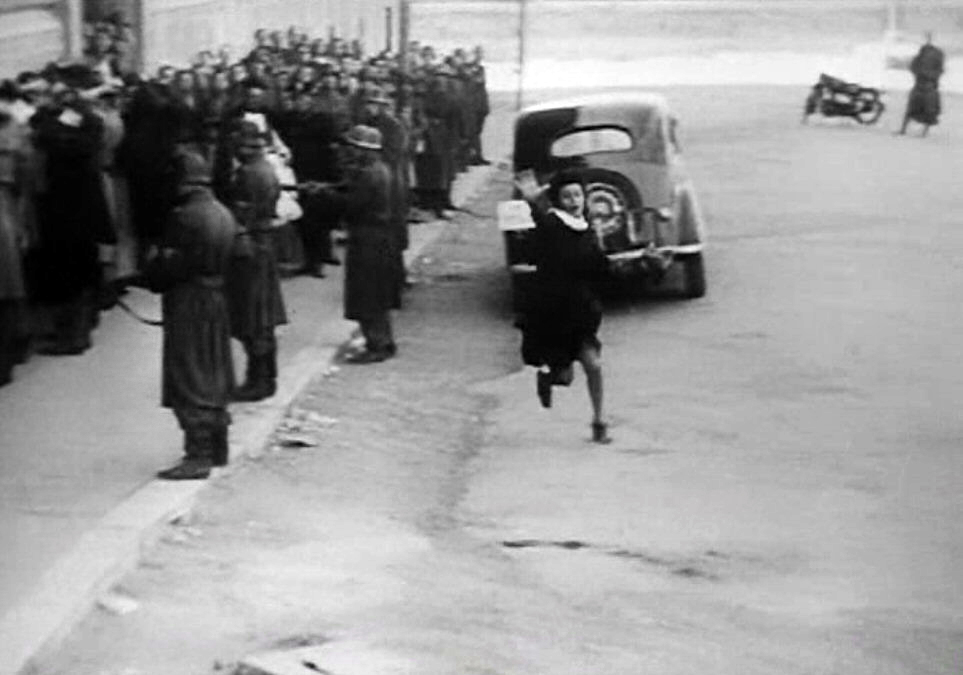
Anna Magnani as Pina in a famous scene from the film

Nazi commander Major Bergmann organises a raid of Francesco's apartment building. While Luigi again escapes, Francesco is arrested and thrown in a truck to be hauled off. Seeing him, Pina breaks through a cordon screaming his name, but is shot dead by the soldiers in front of her young son. Don Pietro, who was in the building to erase any trace of the Resistance weapons under the guise of administering last rites for a dying man, holds her in his arms and prays.

The German convoy carrying Francesco and other Italian prisoners is attacked by the partisans. Most of the prisoners manage to escape, and Francesco reconnects with Luigi. The two then hide at the home of Luigi's girlfriend, nightclub performer Marina. Luigi rebukes Marina over her lifestyle and Marina, having become addicted to painkillers by Gestapo agent Ingrid, betrays both him and Francesco to the Nazis. Luigi and Don Pietro are arrested the next morning, while Francesco narrowly eludes capture. Ingrid rewards Marina with a fur coat and more painkillers.

Bergmann, seeking to extract everything from his captives before dawn in order to take the partisans by surprise, orders Luigi to be tortured and forces Don Pietro to watch. In an attempt to sway Don Pietro, he describes Luigi as an atheist, a communist and an enemy of the Church, while Don Pietro placidly responds that anyone who strives to live a righteous life is doing God's work. Luigi eventually dies without revealing anything. Marina, who was in the adjacent officers' club, faints after witnessing the aftermath. Ingrid declares that she is now useless and retrieves her fur coat.

Don Pietro is executed the following morning, though a German officer has to intervene when the Italian firing squad appears reluctant in carrying out the order. The parish altar boys look on and whistles a Resistance tune to Don Pietro, which heartens him. The boys then bow their heads in grief and slowly depart, the city of Rome and the dome of St. Peter's Basilica looming in the background.

== Cast ==
- Aldo Fabrizi as Don Pietro Pellegrini
- Anna Magnani as Pina
- Marcello Pagliero (dubbed by Lauro Gazzolo) as Giorgio Manfredi
- Vito Annicchiarico (dubbed by Ferruccio Amendola) as Marcello
- Nando Bruno as Agostino
- Harry Feist (dubbed by Giulio Panicali) as Major Bergmann
- Giovanna Galletti (dubbed by Roswita Schmidt) as Ingrid
- Francesco Grandjacquet (dubbed by Gualtiero De Angelis) as Francesco
- Eduardo Passarelli as Police Sergeant
- Maria Michi as Marina Mari
- Carla Rovere (dubbed by Rosetta Calavetta) as Lauretta
- Carlo Sindici as Police Commissioner
- Joop van Hulzen as Captain Hartmann
- Ákos Tolnay as Austrian deserter
- Alberto Tavazzi as Priest

== Development ==
By the end of World War II, Rossellini had abandoned the film Desiderio, as conditions made it impossible to complete (though it was later finished by Marcello Pagliero in 1946 and disowned by Rossellini). By 1944, there was virtually no film industry in Italy, and the origins of the film's initial funding are unclear. Rossellini had initially planned a documentary titled Storie di ieri on the subject of Don Pietro Morosini, a Catholic priest who had been shot by the Nazis for helping the partisan movement in Italy, and began meeting with a number of screenwriters in Rome shortly after Germany abandoned the city. Federico Fellini was initially uninterested in joining, as he had disapproved of partisan action during the occupation.

== Production ==
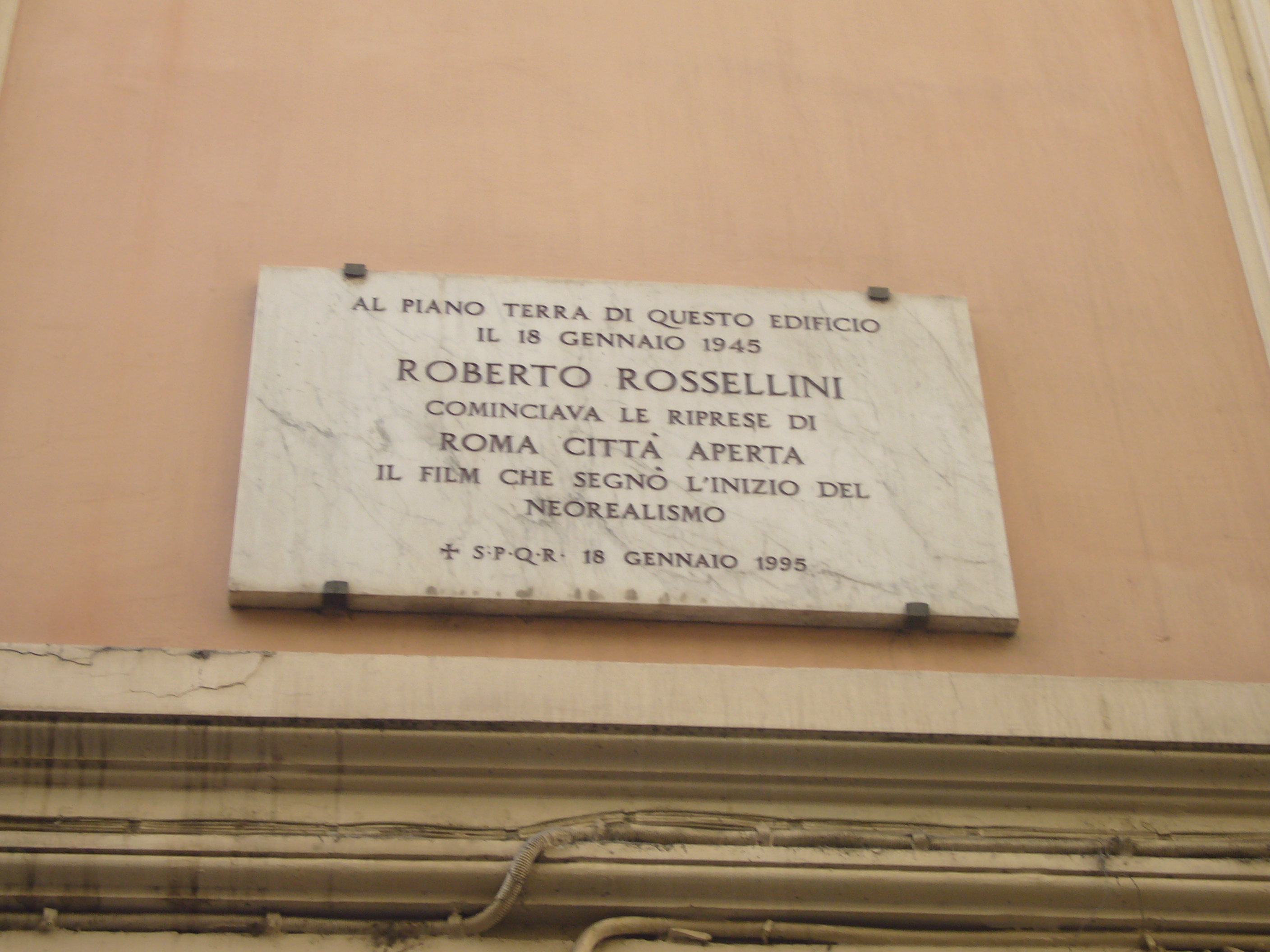
A plaque in Rome commemorating the film's production

The Nazis abandoned Rome on June 4, 1944; the Allies occupied the undefended city the next day. Shooting for the film began in January 1945 under precarious conditions, with its style developing from circumstance. The facilities at Cinecittà Studios were unavailable at the time, as they had been damaged in the war and were then currently requisitioned by Allied forces to house displaced persons.

Aldo Venturini, a wool merchant with some capital to invest, was involved in financing the film. After a few days of shooting production had stopped due to lack of cash, and Rossellini convinced Venturini to complete the film as a producer, arguing that it was the only way to safeguard his investment.

New Yorker Rod E. Geiger, a soldier in the Signal Corps who eventually became instrumental in the movie's global success, met Rossellini at a point when the production was out of film. Geiger had access to film - short-ends and complete rolls that might have become fogged, scratched, or otherwise deemed unfit for use - that the Signal Corps regularly threw away. He provided enough of this stock for the picture to be completed.

In order to authentically portray the hardships and poverty of life in Rome under the occupation Rossellini hired mostly non-professional actors; a few exceptions included established stars Fabrizi and Anna Magnani. According to Rossellini, "the situation of the moment guided by my own and the actors' moods and perspectives" dictated what was shot, and he relied more on improvisation than on a script. He also stated that the work was "a film about fear, the fear felt by all of us but by me in particular. I too had to go into hiding. I too was on the run. I had friends who were captured and killed." Rossellini relied on traditional devices of melodrama, such as identification of the film's central characters and a clear distinction between the primary good and evil ones. Only four interior sets were constructed for the more important locations of the film. Production ended in June 1945.

The film's documentary or newsreel style reflects in part different film stocks used in its production. When the Cineteca Nazionale restored the print in 1995 it stated that the original negative consisted of just three different types: Ferrania C6 for outdoor scenes, and the more sensitive Agfa Super Pan and Agfa Ultra Rapid for interiors. The previously unexplained changes in image brightness and consistency are now attributed to inadequate processing, including variable development times, insufficient agitation in the developing bath, and insufficient fixing.

Unlike films made in the early years of the war (when Italy was Germany's ally under Mussolini) that depicted the British, Americans, Greeks, Russians and other allied countries, as well as Ethiopians, communists, and partisans, as antagonists, Rome, Open City was one of the early Italian films of the war to depict the struggle as being against the Germans and Italian fascists. Even though the Allied Invasion of Italy took place in 1943, there is no trace of any Allied presence or imminent arrival in the movie; instead, references are made to it being only "the beginning" of what was characterized as a long struggle ahead, not a Nazi evacuation of Rome that had already occurred.

== Distribution ==
The film opened in Italy on 27 September 1945, with the war damage to Rome not yet repaired. The United States premiere followed on 25 February 1946 in New York, released by Joseph Burstyn and Arthur Mayer. The American release was censored, resulting in a cut of about 15 minutes. The story of the film's journey from Italy to the United States is recounted in Federico Fellini's autobiographical essay "Sweet Beginnings" published in 1996. Rod E. Geiger, a U.S. Army private stationed in Rome, met Rossellini and Fellini after catching them tapping into the power supply used to illuminate the G.I. dancehall. In the book The Adventures of Roberto Rossellini, author Tag Gallagher credits Geiger at age 29 as the "man who more than any single individual was to make him and the new Italian cinema famous around the world." Before the war, Geiger had worked for an American distributor and exhibitor of foreign films which helped facilitate the film's release in the United States. In gratitude, Rossellini gave Geiger a co-producer credit.

However, according to Fellini's essay Geiger was "a 'half-drunk' soldier who stumbled (literally as well as figuratively) onto the set of Open City. [He] misrepresented himself as an American producer when actually he 'was a nobody and didn't have a dime.'" Fellini's account of Geiger's involvement in the film was the subject of an unsuccessful 1983 defamation lawsuit Geiger brought against Fellini.

The film was banned in several countries. West Germany banned it from 1951 to 1960. In Argentina, it was inexplicably withdrawn in 1947 following an anonymous government order.

== Box office ==
Thanks to heavy marketing by Arthur Mayer and his partner Joseph Burstyn in Life magazine, Rome Open City grossed a total of $3 million at the U.S. box office; an unprecedented number for an Italian movie playing mainly in small, independent theaters. With this success, Rome Open City increased the demand for foreign cinema in the United States.

== Critical response ==
Rome, Open City received a mediocre reception from Italian audiences when it was first released when Italian people were said to want escapism after the war. However, it became more popular as the film's reputation grew in other countries. The film brought international attention to Italian cinema and is considered a quintessential example of neorealism in film, so much so that together with Paisà and Germania anno zero it is called Rossellini's "Neorealist Trilogy". Robert Burgoyne called it "the perfect exemplar of this mode of cinematic creation [neorealism] whose established critical definition was given by André Bazin". Rossellini himself traced what was called neorealism back to one of his earlier films The White Ship, which he claimed had the same style. Some Italian critics also maintained that neorealism was simply a continuation of earlier Italian films from the 1930s, such as those directed by filmmakers Francesco De Robertis and Alessandro Blasetti. More recent scholarship points out that this film is actually less neo-realist and rather melodramatic. Critics debate whether the pending marriage of the Catholic Pina and the communist Francesco really "acknowledges the working partnership of communists and Catholics in the actual historical resistance".

Bosley Crowther, film critic for The New York Times, gave the film a highly positive review, and wrote "Yet the total effect of the picture is a sense of real experience, achieved as much by the performance as by the writing and direction. The outstanding performance is that of Aldo Fabrizi as the priest, who embraces with dignity and humanity a most demanding part. Marcello Pagliero is excellent too, as the resistance leader, and Anna Magnani brings humility and sincerity to the role of the woman who is killed. The remaining cast is unqualifiedly fine, with the exception of Harry Feist in the role of the German commander. His elegant arrogance is a bit too vicious – but that may be easily understood." Film critic William Wolf especially praised the scene where Pina is shot, stating that "few scenes in cinema have the force of that in which Magnani, arms outstretched, races towards the camera to her death."

In The Nation in 1946, critic James Agee stated, "Open City lacks the depth of characterization, thought, and feeling which might have made it a definitively great film. From there on out I have nothing but admiration for it. Even these failures in depth and complexity are sacrifices to virtues just as great: you seldom see as pure freshness and vitality in a film, or as little unreality and affectation among the players; one feels that everything was done too fast and with too fierce a sincerity to run the risk of bogging down in mere artistry or meditativeness ... The film's finest over-all quality, which could rarely be matched so spectacularly, is this immediacy."

Pope Francis has said that the film is among his favorites. The film was also included by the Vatican in a list of important films compiled in 1995, under the category of "Values".

On the review aggregator website Rotten Tomatoes, 100% of 45 critics' reviews are positive, with an average rating of 9.4/10. The website's consensus reads: "Open City fills in the familiar contours of its storyline with three-dimensional characters and a narrative depth that add up to a towering -- and still powerfully resonant -- cinematic achievement."

== Other media ==
The difficulties encountered by the director and crew before and during the shooting of "Rome, Open City" are dramatized in the 1996 film Celluloide by Carlo Lizzani and in it Massimo Ghini plays the role of Rossellini. In 2005, The Children of Rome Open City was released, a documentary directed by Laura Muscardin.

== Accolades ==
=== Academy Awards ===
Year	Category	Nominee	Result
1947	Best Writing, Screenplay	Sergio Amidei, Federico Fellini	Nominated

=== National Board of Review Award ===
Year	Category	Nominee	Result
1946	Best Actress	Anna Magnani	Won
1946	Best Foreign Language Film	—N/a	Won
1946	Top Ten Films	—N/a	No. 2

=== New York Film Critics Circle Award ===
Year	Category	Nominee	Result
1946	Best Foreign Language Film	—N/a	Won

=== Nastros d'Argento ===
Year	Category	Nominee	Result
1946	Best Film	—N/a	Won
1946	Best Supporting Actress	Anna Magnani	Won

=== Film festivals ===
Year	Festival	Category	Nominee	Result
1946	Cannes Film Festival	Palme d'Or	Roberto Rossellini	Won

== See also ==
- List of films with a 100% rating on Rotten Tomatoes, a review aggregator website
