= Paisan =

1946 film by Roberto Rossellini

- Directed by: Roberto Rossellini
- Written by: Sergio Amidei; Federico Fellini; Marcello Pagliero; Alfred Hayes; Roberto Rossellini (Note: Rod E. Geiger, Klaus Mann, and Vasco Pratolini also made uncredited contributions to the story and screenplay.)
- Produced by: Roberto Rossellini; Mario Conti; Rod E. Geiger
- Starring: Carmela Sazio; Robert Van Loon; Dots Johnson; Alfonsino Bovino; Maria Michi; Gar Moore; Harriet White; Renzo Avanzo; William Tubbs; Dale Edmonds; Achille Siviero
- Cinematography: Otello Martelli
- Edited by: Eraldo Da Roma
- Music by: Renzo Rossellini
- Distributed by: Metro-Goldwyn-Mayer
- Release date: 10 December 1946 (Italy)
- Running time: 126 minutes
- Country: Italy
- Languages: Italian; English; German
- Budget: 56 million Lire
- Box office: 100 million Lire (Italy); $1 million (US)

Paisan (Italian: Paisà) (Note: Paisan or paisà was a term used by Italians and American servicemen during the liberation of Italy, derived from the Neapolitan term paisano, equivalent to Italian paesano, referring to a person from one's own hometown or country, but also to a friend or "buddy".) is a 1946 Italian neorealist war drama film directed by Roberto Rossellini. In six independent episodes, it tells of the Liberation of Italy by the Allied forces during the late stage of World War II. The film premiered at the Venice International Film Festival and received numerous national and international prizes.

In 2008, the film was included in the Italian Ministry of Cultural Heritage’s 100 Italian films to be saved, a list of 100 films that "have changed the collective memory of the country between 1942 and 1978."

== Plot ==
=== 1st Episode ===
During the Allied invasion of Sicily, an American patrol makes its way to a village at night. Only one of the Americans speaks Italian. Local girl Carmela, who wants to find the whereabouts of her brother and father, agrees to guide the patrol past a German minefield to the seaside. While one of the patrol, Joe, is assigned to keep an eye on Carmela in a castle ruin, the others inspect the area. Despite the language barrier, Joe starts to overcome Carmela's distance. When he is shot by a German sniper, Carmela hides him in the basement of the building. Upon the discovery that Joe has died, she takes his rifle and starts shooting at the enemy. When the Americans return, they find Joe's body and assume Carmela killed him. The last scene shows the dead Carmela lying at the bottom of the cliffs, having been shot by the German patrol.

=== 2nd Episode ===
The Allies invade mainland Italy and capture the port of Naples. An orphaned street urchin named Pasquale happens upon Joe, a drunk African-American soldier who is about to become the victim of a robbery. When the police arrive, Pasquale runs away with Joe, who tells him of his war experiences. After Joe falls asleep, Pasquale takes his boots. The next day, Joe, who turns out to be a military policeman, catches Pasquale stealing supplies from a truck. Joe demands his boots back, but when the boy takes him to where he lives, the sight of the squalor causes Joe to leave without them.

=== 3rd Episode ===
Francesca, a young prostitute in liberated Rome, takes Fred, a drunken American soldier, to the room where she serves her customers. He is not interested in her services and tells her of his futile search for a young woman he met and fell in love with shortly after the liberation of the city six months earlier. As he describes the woman, Francesca realises that she is the woman; both of them have changed so much in the short time that has passed that they do not recognise each other. When Fred falls asleep, Francesca slips out, asking the landlady to give Fred a piece of paper with her address on it when he awakes, and leaves. The next day, Fred finds the paper in his pocket and throws it away, telling a comrade it was a prostitute's address. While Francesca waits for him in vain, he leaves the city with his unit.

=== 4th Episode ===
The southern half of Florence is freed, but fierce fighting continues in the other half, across the Arno river, between Italian partisans and the Germans and their fascist allies. All the bridges except the Ponte Vecchio have been blown up, stalling the Allied advance. American nurse Harriet learns that the leader of the partisans, "Lupo", is an artist whom she knew in Florence before the war. She teams up with partisan Massimo, a man desperate for news of his family, and enters the embattled city through the Vasari Corridor. After being held up by a gunfight, Massimo proceeds with his search, while Harriet takes care of a wounded partisan, from whom she hears of Lupo's recent death.

=== 5th Episode ===
Three American military chaplains are welcomed to stay the night at a Roman Catholic monastery in the Apennine Mountains west of Rimini. Captain Bill Martin, who is the only one of the chaplains who speaks Italian, acts as interpreter. The monks are dismayed to learn from Martin that only he is a Catholic; his two colleagues are a Protestant and a Jew. When the guests and their hosts sit down to supper, Martin observes that the monks have nothing on their plates. He inquires and learns that the monks have decided to fast in the hope of gaining the favour of Heaven to convert the other two to their faith. Despite the rule that meals have to be taken in silence, Martin holds a speech in which he expresses his appreciation for having found his peace again which he had believed to be lost in the tribulations of war.

=== 6th Episode ===
In December 1944, three members of the OSS are operating behind German lines with Italian partisans in the Po delta. They rescue two downed British airmen. On their return to the Italian family who supported them, they find that these have been executed by the Germans. Later, the Allied soldiers and the partisans get involved in a gunfight and are captured by the enemy. A German officer explains to the captives his country's motives for the war, and that it will not stop before having built a new and lasting civilization. The partisans are summarily executed the next day, and the American prisoners shot when they try to interfere. The film closes with a voice-over narration (which opens each episode), stating, "This happened in the winter of 1944. By the beginning of Spring, the war was over."

== Cast ==
- Carmela Sazio as Carmela
- Robert Van Loon as Joe (first episode)
- Benjamin Emanuel as Sarge (first episode)
- Dots Johnson as Joe (second episode)
- Alfonsino Pasca as Pasquale (credited as Alfonsino)
- Maria Michi as Francesca
- Gar Moore as Fred
- Harriet White as Harriet
- Renzo Avanzo as Massimo
- Giulietta Masina as the Major's daughter
- William Tubbs as Captain Bill Martin
- Father Vincenzo Carrella as friar guardian
- Captain Owen Jones as Protestant chaplain
- Sergeant Elmer Feldman as Jewish chaplain
- Dale Edmonds as Dale
- Achille Siviero as Cigolani
- Roberto Van Loel as German officer
- Giulio Panicali as narrator

== Production ==
After the success of Rome, Open City, Rossellini was able to obtain funding from Italian and American investors with the help of producer Rod E. Geiger, who encouraged him to make another film on the Italian resistance movement. Geiger also supplied Rossellini with raw film stock and four American players, Dots Johnson, Gar Moore, Harriet White and Dale Edmonds. The screenplay was based on scripts and stories by Klaus Mann, Marcello Pagliero, Sergio Amidei, Federico Fellini, Alfred Hayes, and Vasco Pratolini. These underwent substantial changes during the writing process, and two additional episodes remained unrealised.

Rossellini's cast consisted of known and unknown professional actors, and of amateurs like Carmela Sazio in the first episode or the friars in the fifth episode. Filming often took place in locations which stood in for the episode's settings: The scenes with American tanks arriving in Rome was shot in Livorno, while many interior shots supposedly set in Florence were shot in Rome. Also, the voices of many actors did not match the required local dialect. Sazio, a Sicilian girl in the script, spoke with Neapolitan accent and had to be dubbed, as did the friars, whose monastery was located near Salerno in the South but supposed to be set in Northern Italy.

== Release ==
Paisan premiered at the Venice International Film Festival on 18 September 1946 and was released in Italian cinemas on 10 December the same year. It was released in the US by Mayer-Burstyn in an English subtitled version running 90 minutes in 1947.

A restored version of the film was released in the US on Blu-ray and DVD by The Criterion Collection in 2010.

== Reception and legacy ==
Although awarded at the Venice International Film Festival and by the Italian National Syndicate of Film Journalists, the film's initial reception in Italy was mixed for political and religious reasons. Internationally, it received unanimous critical acclaim. French critic André Bazin chose it as the key film to demonstrate the importance of Italian neorealism, emphasising its grasp of reality through an amalgam of documentary technique and fiction. Bosley Crowther of The New York Times titled it "a milestone in the expressiveness of the screen" which achieves a "tremendous naturalness" through its actuality photography and casting of unknowns. Paisan received numerous prizes in the US (including the New York Film Critics Circle Award), Belgium, Japan and Switzerland, and was nominated for the Academy Award for Best Original Screenplay. Contrary to the prevalent opinion, film theorist Rudolf Arnheim questioned the exaltation of the monks and their intolerance towards the non-Catholic chaplains in the monastery episode, a view which was shared by critics Robert Warshow and, later, Pio Baldelli.

Film historians and critics who pointed out the film's importance in later years include Jóse Luis Guarner, who titled it "a masterpiece of neorealism as well as one of the peaks of film history," Robin Wood, Dave Kehr and Richard Brody. Martin Scorsese listed it among the "39 Essential Foreign Films for a Young Filmmaker" and included it in his "Top 10" list for the Criterion Collection. Gillo Pontecorvo credited Paisan as the film which convinced him to become a director himself. On the other hand, reviewers like Tony Rayns and Allan James Thomas, although acknowledging its status in film history, remarked upon the film's sentimentality and a lack of thematic coherence and causality regarding its content.
