= Norma Barzman =

American screenwriter (1920–2023)

- Publicity photo of Barzman
- Born: Norma Levor; September 15, 1920; New York City, U.S.
- Died: December 17, 2023 (aged 103); Beverly Hills, California, U.S.
- Education: Radcliffe College
- Occupations: Screenwriter; actress
- Years active: 1946–2000
- Spouses: Claude Shannon (m. 1940; div. 1941); Ben Barzman (m. 1942; died 1989)
- Children: 7, including Paolo

Norma Levor Barzman (September 15, 1920 – December 17, 2023) was an American journalist, screenwriter, actress and novelist who was active in the film industry in the Golden Age of Hollywood.

== Life and career ==
Barzman was born into a Jewish family on September 15, 1920, in Manhattan, New York City. She attended Radcliffe College in Cambridge, Massachusetts. She started her career in 1946 writing the original story for Never Say Goodbye and The Locket. Later, she also wrote Finishing School (1952) and Il triangolo rosso (1967).

Barzman also appeared as an actress in Theatre 70 (1970) and Pajama Party (2000) as the Groovy Grandma guest.

== Personal life ==
Barzman married mathematician Claude Shannon, known as the "father of information theory", and lived with him in Princeton, New Jersey. When they divorced, Barzman moved to Los Angeles with her mother and took classes at the School for Writers, the members of which were leftists. She met and married screenwriter Ben Barzman. Having been blacklisted from Hollywood between the years 1949 and 1976, they lived in London, Paris, and on the French Riviera at Mougins. They had seven children.

Barzman died at her home in Beverly Hills, California, on December 17, 2023, at the age of 103.

== Filmography ==
=== Writer ===
- Il triangolo rosso (1967)
- Finishing School (1952)
- The Locket (1946)
- Never Say Goodbye (1946)

=== Actress ===
- Pajama Party (2000) – Groovy Grandma guest
- Theatre 70 (1960) – narrator

=== Documentary ===
- Les exilés d'Hollywood (2006)
- Imaginary Witness: Hollywood and the Holocaust (2004)

== Books ==
- The End of Romance: A Memoir of Love, Sex, and the Mystery of the Violin (2006)
- The Red and the Blacklist: The Intimate Memoir of a Hollywood Expatriate (2002)
- Rich Dreams (1982)
