= Christ in Concrete =

1939 novel by Pietro Di Donato

- First edition
- Author: Pietro Di Donato
- Language: English
- Published: 1939
- Publisher: Bobbs-Merrill
- Publication place: U.S.
- Media type: Print

Christ in Concrete is a 1939 novel by Pietro Di Donato about Italian-American construction workers. The book, which made Di Donato famous overnight, was originally published by Esquire Magazine as a short story in 1937, and subsequently expanded into a novel by the 28-year-old Di Donato.

The novel was inspired by the death of Di Donato's father in a construction accident on Good Friday in 1923. It tells the story of a bricklayer and his struggle to provide a home for his family.

As indicated by the title, the novel is noted for its rich religious imagery, presented in a largely modernist stream-of-consciousness style. It was adapted into a 1949 motion picture, Give Us This Day, directed by Edward Dmytryk. The movie's background, the director's Hollywood blacklisting, and subsequent debut of the film in England, is covered on the Di Donato website.

== Plot ==
I. Geremio: Geremio and his coworkers are gruesomely killed on the job when the building they are working on collapses. Geremio is swallowed in wet concrete; as he struggles desperately to breathe, his mind snaps, and he is transported to his sunny seaside youth in Vasto, Italy. The scene depicting the Good Friday building collapse, the horrific fate of his paesano fellow workers, and Geremio's agonizing struggle for air, shocked the American reading public of 1939 and permanently ensconced these characters in 20th Century literature.

II. Job: Geremio's pregnant widow, Annunziata, is left with no way to provide for their already-large family. Her brother Luigi promises to help, but soon he himself is injured at work and loses part of his leg. Geremio and Annunziata's oldest son, Paul, tries to find charity from local businesses and from the church, but with no success. He decides to take his father's place as brick-layer, and after a while is accepted by the other workers as having inherited his father's skills; yet, because of his youth, the company pays him only a pittance and Paul overworks himself. In this section, the word "job" is treated like a character and often capitalized.

III. Tenement: Unable to work, Paul remains at home; di Donato uses this section to explore some of the other families in the tenement, including the Olsens, whose daughter Gloria attracts Paul, and the Molovs, Russian Jews whose son Louis befriends Paul after telling him about the death of his older brother back in Russia. Also in this section, Annunziata and Paul visit a psychic, who reassures them that Geremio is watching over and praying for them, and attend the hearing at the Compensation Bureau, which ends indecisively with the construction company blaming the workers for the accident and the insurance company claiming the accident falls outside the bounds of the policies they have with the construction company.

IV. Fiesta: Paul gets a better-paying job as a bricklayer, and later gets a job working on skyscrapers. Luigi comes home from the hospital and eventually marries Cola, providing the fiesta of the title.

V. Annunziata: The Great Depression hits, and Paul helps his mentor Nazone get work, only to have Nazone fall to his death after a fight with the foreman. Distraught, Paul tells his mother that he no longer believes in God or in the afterlife, a confession that shatters her and for which he spends the final pages asking forgiveness.

== Characters ==
- Paul
- Geremio
- Annunziata
- Luigi
- Nazone
- Louis
