= Frank Fleming (association footballer) =

English footballer

Personal information
- Full name: Francis Joseph Fleming
- Date of birth: 21 December 1945 (age 80)
- Place of birth: South Shields, England
- Position: Goalkeeper

Senior career*
Years	Team	Apps	(Gls)
1964–1965	Darlington	2	(0)
- * Club domestic league appearances and goals

Francis Joseph Fleming (born 21 December 1945) was an English footballer who played in the Football League for Darlington as a goalkeeper.

Fleming was born in South Shields in 1945. He joined Darlington in July 1964, and made two senior appearances, both in the Fourth Division as a stand-in for regular goalkeeper Jimmy O'Neill. His debut came on 3 October 1964, in a 3–1 defeat away to Bradford Park Avenue, and he kept his place for the next match before O'Neill returned to the side.
