= Frank Fleming (sculptor) =

American sculptor

- Born: 1940|06|17; Bear Creek, AL
- Died: 2018|03|18; Birmingham, AL
- Education: University of Alabama
- Occupation: Sculptor
- Years active: 1973-2018
- Known for: Realistic depictions of animals and mythological creatures
- Notable work: Storyteller Fountain; Five Points South

Frank Fleming was a renowned sculptor who was born in Bear Creek, Alabama, in 1940 and died in 2018 at St. Vincent's Hospital after a brief illness. He had five brothers and one sister. His father was a poor farmer, while his mother was exceptionally skilled at sewing clothes. While growing up, Fleming and his brothers and sister plowed with mules and grew vegetables for family consumption.

Fleming earned a Bachelor's degree in Art from Florence State College (now the University of North Alabama) and a Master's of Fine Arts from the University of Alabama.

== Works by Fleming ==
- Fleming, Frank (1982). Personal Mythologies. Birmingham, Alabama: Birmingham Museum of Art. p. 16. OCLC 19899392.

== Possible references ==
- Frank Fleming sculptures, Al Sella paintings among iconic works discovered at Artists Incorporated in Birmingham James R. Nelson, December 14, 2008
- Alabama sculptor Frank Fleming arrested in undercover sting in Huntsville August 22, 2008
- Gov. Riley Announces Artists Featured in Year of Alabama Arts
- "Public Art in Alabama" (PDF)., by Al Head, AlabamaArts, Volume XXI, Number 2
