= Ben Barzman =

Canadian writer (1910–1989)

- Born: October 12, 1910; Toronto, Ontario, Canada
- Died: December 15, 1989 (aged 79); Santa Monica, California, U.S.
- Occupations: Screenwriter; writer
- Spouse: Norma Barzman (m. 1942)
- Children: 7, Paolo Barzman

Ben Barzman (October 12, 1910 – December 15, 1989) was a Canadian journalist, screenwriter, and novelist, blacklisted during the McCarthy Era and known best for his screenplays for the movies Back to Bataan (1945), El Cid (1961), and The Blue Max (1966).

== Career ==
He was born in Toronto, Ontario to a Jewish family. He was the screenwriter or co-writer of more than 20 movies, from You're a Lucky Fellow, Mr. Smith (1943) to The Head of Normande St. Onge (1975).

=== Blacklisting ===
Like many of his colleagues in the movie business, Barzman was blacklisted by the House Un-American Activities Committee (HUAC).

His wife, Norma Barzman, was a Communist Party USA member from 1943 to 1949. In 2014, she told the Los Angeles Times, "one should be proud to have been a member of the American Communist Party during those years. Hitler was invading the Soviet Union, so there was no reason to be anti-Russian, they were our allies."

The couple relocated to England so Barzman could work on the movies Give Us This Day (aka, Christ In Concrete, 1949). After his return to the United States after directing Give Us This Day, Edward Dmytryk, one of the Hollywood Ten, testified about the Barzmans to HUAC in 1951. "To get out of prison he named us and a lot of other people," said Norma Barzman in 2014. During the 1950s, the family relocated to Paris, where friends included Pablo Picasso, Yves Montand, and Simone Signoret, and later southern France. Barzman did not receive credit for some movies because of the Hollywood Blacklist.

His U.S. citizenship was revoked from 1954 to 1963. His wife Norma had her passport revoked in 1951 for seven years. The family remained abroad in London, Paris, and Mougins (France) until 1976, during which time he wrote his novels and screenplays for French and Italian movies.

== Death ==
Barzman died on December 15, 1989, in Santa Monica, California.

== Work ==
=== Filmography ===
- 1943: You're a Lucky Fellow, Mr. Smith
- 1945: Back to Bataan
- 1946: Never Say Goodbye
- 1948: The Boy with Green Hair
- 1949: Give Us This Day
- 1952: Stranger on the Prowl (it: Imbarco a mezzanotte)
- 1952: The Faithful City
- 1952: Young Man with Ideas
- 1955: Oasis
- 1957: Time Without Pity
- 1957: He Who Must Die (fr: Celui qui doit mourir)
- 1959: Blind Date (US: Chance Meeting)
- 1961: El Cid
- 1963: 55 Days at Peking
- 1963: The Ceremony
- 1964: The Fall of the Roman Empire
- 1964: The Visit
- 1965: The Heroes of Telemark
- 1966: The Blue Max
- 1969: Z—uncredited
- 1972: The Assassination
- 1974: The Martyr (ger: Sie sind frei, Doktor Korczak)
- 1975: Normande

=== Bibliography ===
In 1960, Barzman became a science fiction author, with his novel Out Of This World. It dealt with the idea of a twin planet of Earth in the same orbit as Earth, hidden from our view by the sun. The two planets had developed almost identically from creation—but World War II never happened on the twin Earth.

- Out of This World (London: Collins, 1960) - published in the U.S.A. as Twinkle, Twinkle Little Star (G.P. Putnam's Sons) and subsequently in various paperback editions as Echo X; also published in Sweden as Från en annan värld.
- Rich Dreams (Warner Books, 1982) - novel, written with Norma Barzman; published as a paperback original.

== Awards ==
- 1985: Order of Arts and Letters

== Legacy ==
He received a retrospective showing of his movies at the Cinematheque in 1982.

== External sources ==
- Norma Barzman, The Red and the Blacklist (2003)
- Ben Barzman at IMDb
- Tender Comrades: Interviews with Blacklisted Hollywood Reds
- Ben Barzman at the Internet Speculative Fiction Database
