= Hollywood Hills West, Los Angeles =

Neighborhood within Central Los Angeles, California

Coordinates: 34.115892°N 118.369870°W

Hollywood Hills West is a neighborhood within Central Los Angeles, California.

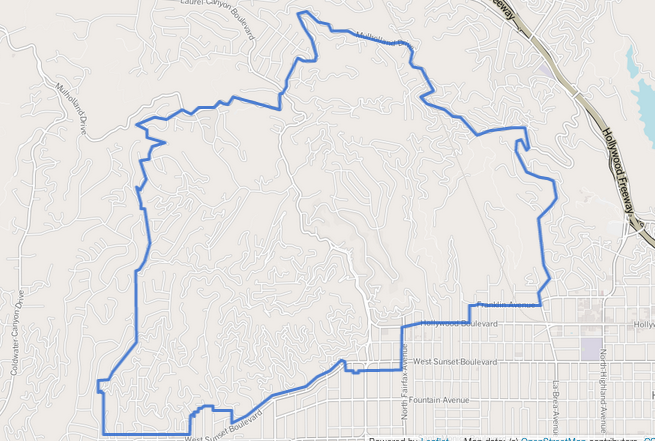
The Hollywood Hills West neighborhood of the city of Los Angeles, as drawn by the Los Angeles Times

== Geography ==
Hollywood Hills West touches Studio City on the north, Hollywood Hills on the east, Hollywood and West Hollywood on the south, and Beverly Hills and Coldwater Canyon on the west. The neighborhood is bisected by Laurel Canyon Boulevard and is bordered on the east by Outpost Drive and on the south by an irregular line that includes Franklin Avenue, Fairfax Avenue and Sunset Boulevard, or the West Hollywood city limits. On the west, the neighborhood ends at the Beverly Hills city line (Trousdale Estates), and on the north it stops at Mulholland Drive.

The area includes the neighborhoods of Crescent Heights, Laurel Canyon, Lookout Mountain, Mount Olympus, Sunset Plaza, and Nichols Canyon.

== Demographics ==
A total of 14,860 people lived in the neighborhood's 4.87 square miles (12.6 km^{2}), according to the 2000 U.S. census—averaging 3,048 inhabitants per square mile (1,177/km^{2}), among the lowest population densities in the city. The population was estimated at 16,003 in 2008. The median age for residents was 41, considered old for the city and the county as a whole. The percentages of residents aged 35 and above are among the county's highest.

The neighborhood is "not particularly diverse," with the diversity index of 0.273, and the percentage of white people is considered high, at 84.9%. Latinos make up 5.8%, Asians are at 3.9%, blacks at 2.7% and others also at 2.7%. In 2000, the United Kingdom (10.3%) and Ukraine (7.2%) were the most common places of birth for the 25.4% of the residents who were born abroad, considered an average percentage of foreign-born when compared with the city or county as a whole.

The median household income in 2008 dollars was $108,199, considered high for both the city and county. The percentage of households earning $125,000 or more was high, compared to the city and the county at large. The average household size of 1.9 people was relatively low. Homeowners occupied 63.6% of the housing units, and renters occupied the rest.

In 2000 there were 178 families headed by single parents, or 5.8%, a rate that was low in both the county and the city. The percentages of never-married men (51%) and divorced men (8.8%) were among the county's highest. A high number of the residents were military veterans—8.4% of the population, with the percentage who served during World War II or the Korean War being among the county's highest.

== Education ==
Hollywood Hills West residents aged 25 and older holding a four-year degree amounted to 58.8% of the population in 2000, considered high compared with the city and the county as a whole, as were the percentages of residents with a bachelor's or a postgraduate degree.

There is only one school within the neighborhood's boundaries: Wonderland Avenue Elementary School, operated by the Los Angeles Unified School District at 8510 Wonderland Avenue.

== Recreation and parks ==
The neighborhood is home to three City of Los Angeles recreation facilities—Laurel Canyon Park, Wattles Garden Park, and Runyon Canyon Park.
