= William Warrington (disambiguation) =

William Warrington (1796–1869) was a British maker of stained glass windows.

William Warrington (or variants) may also refer to:

- Bill Warrington (1910–1981), American special effects artist
- Bill Warrington, character in All Creatures Great and Small
- Sir William le Boteler, Lord of Warrington, High Sheriff of Lancashire
