= 34th Academy Awards =

- Official poster
- Date: April 9, 1962
- Site: Santa Monica Civic Auditorium, Santa Monica, California
- Hosted by: Bob Hope
- Produced by: Arthur Freed
- Directed by: Richard Dunlap

Highlights
- Best Picture: West Side Story
- Most awards: West Side Story (10)
- Most nominations: Judgment at Nuremberg and West Side Story (11)

TV in the United States
- Network: ABC
- Duration: 2 hours, 10 minutes

The 34th Academy Awards, honoring the best in film for 1961, were held on April 9, 1962, hosted by Bob Hope at the Santa Monica Civic Auditorium in Santa Monica, California.

Robert Wise and Jerome Robbins became the first Best Director co-winners for West Side Story. The film won 10 of its 11 nominations, including Best Picture and both supporting acting Oscars, becoming the most successful musical in Oscars history. For the second time in history, all four acting winners were first-time nominees.

Legendary filmmaker Federico Fellini received his first Best Director nomination for La Dolce Vita, while Sophia Loren became the first Italian actress to win for Best Actress in an Italian-language film as well as the first individual to win for a foreign-language performance. Directors Robert Wise and Jerome Robbins became the first pair to share an Oscar for the same film. George C. Scott became the first actor to refuse an award in advance, insisting that the Best Supporting Actor nomination for his performance in The Hustler be revoked. It was not, and he lost.

The most memorable event of the night came when Stan Berman, a New York City cabdriver famous for crashing celebrity parties, evaded security and made his way onstage to award Hope a homemade Oscar.

== Awards ==
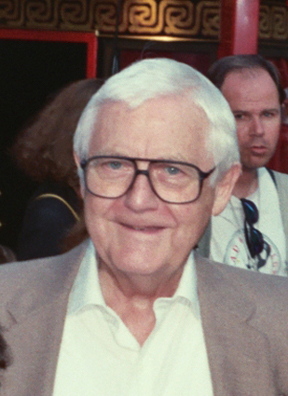
Robert Wise, Best Picture winner and Best Director co-winner

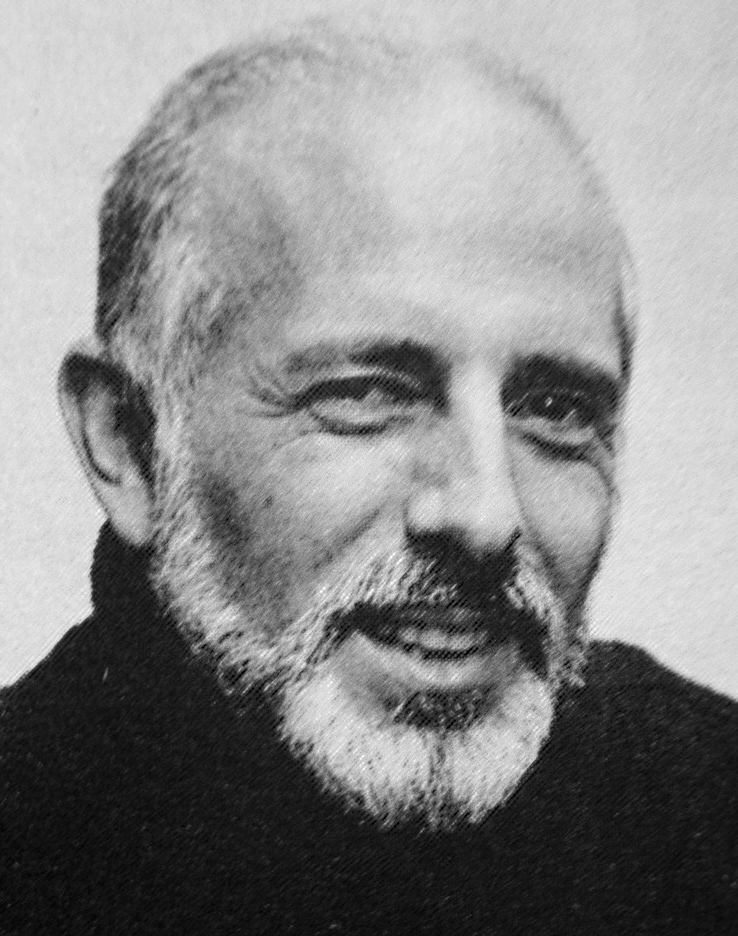
Jerome Robbins, Best Director co-winner

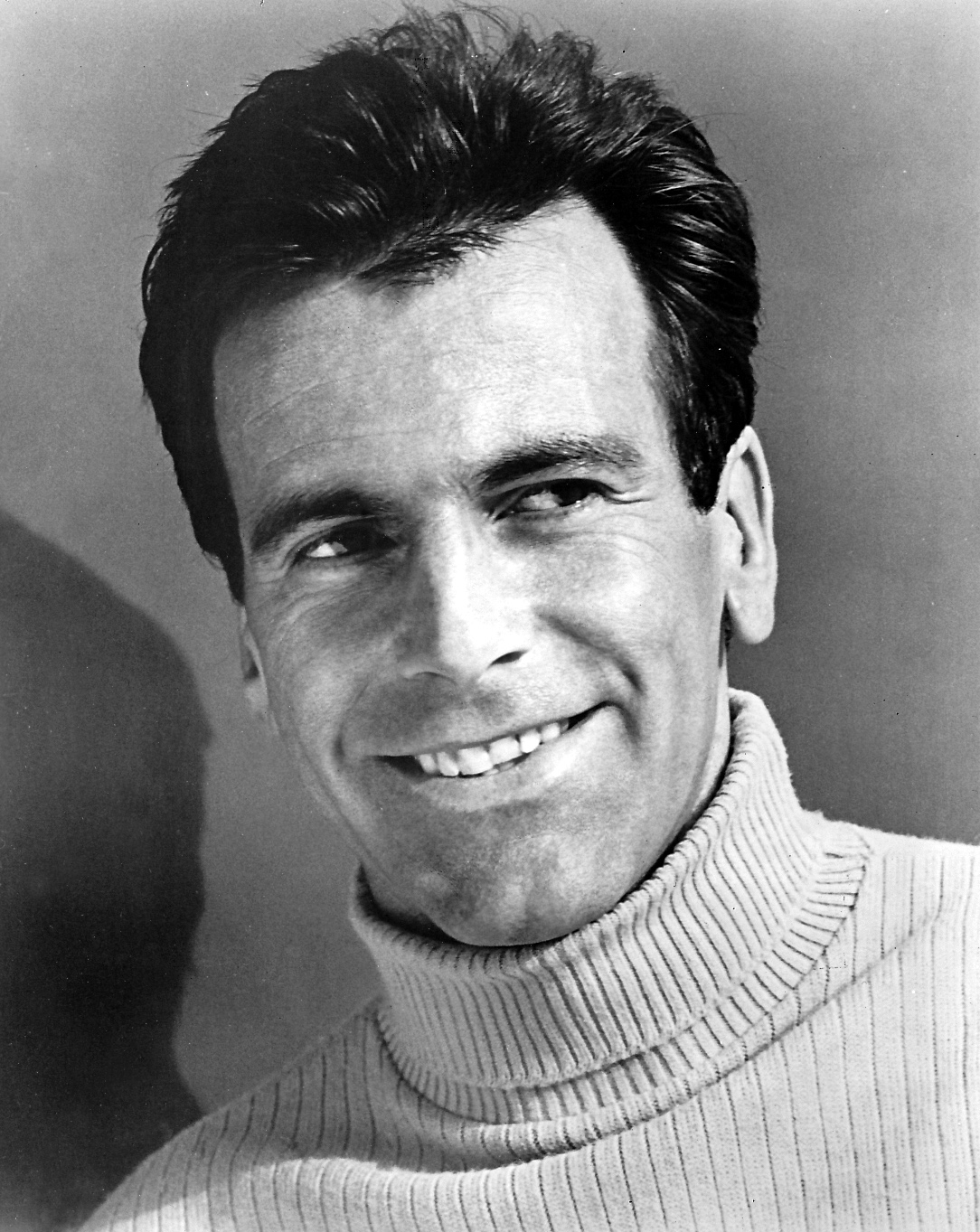
Maximilian Schell, Best Actor winner

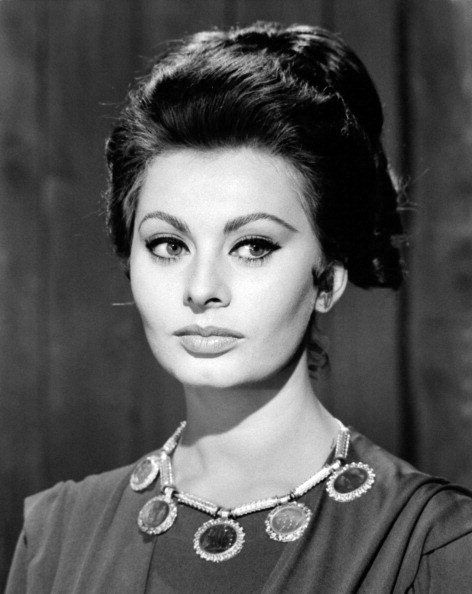
Sophia Loren, Best Actress winner

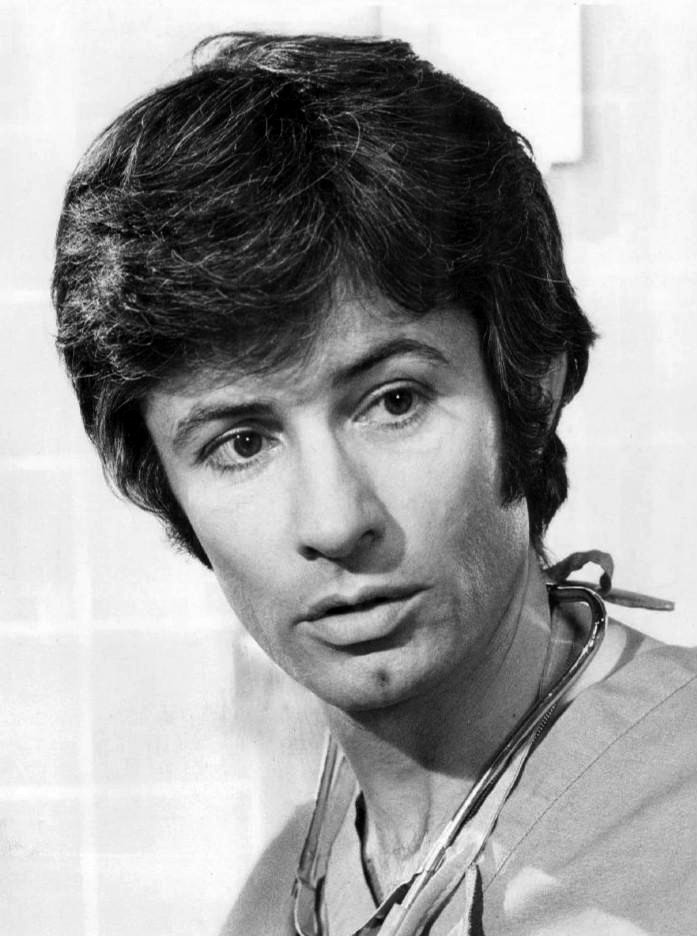
George Chakiris, Best Supporting Actor winner

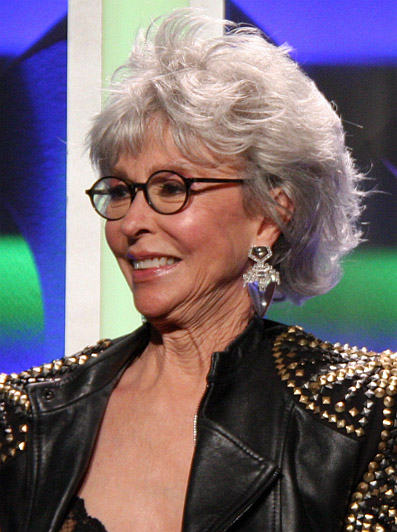
Rita Moreno, Best Supporting Actress winner

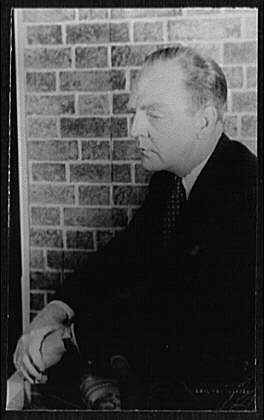
William Inge, Best Story and Screenplay Written Directly for the Screen winner

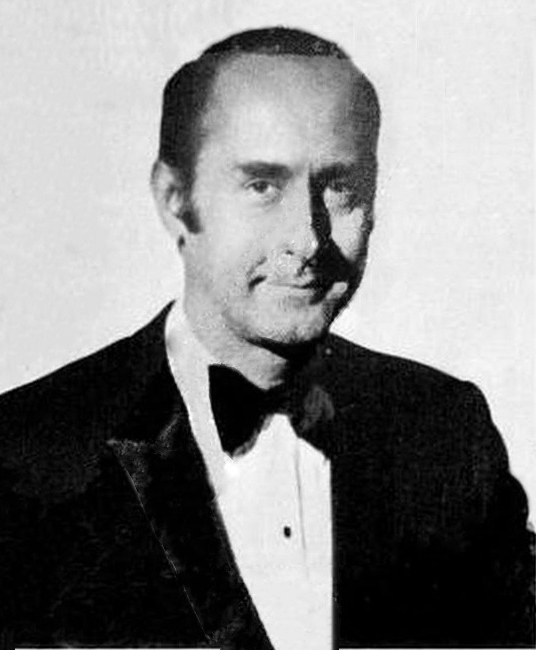
Henry Mancini, Best Music Score of a Dramatic or Comedy Picture winner and Best Song co-winner

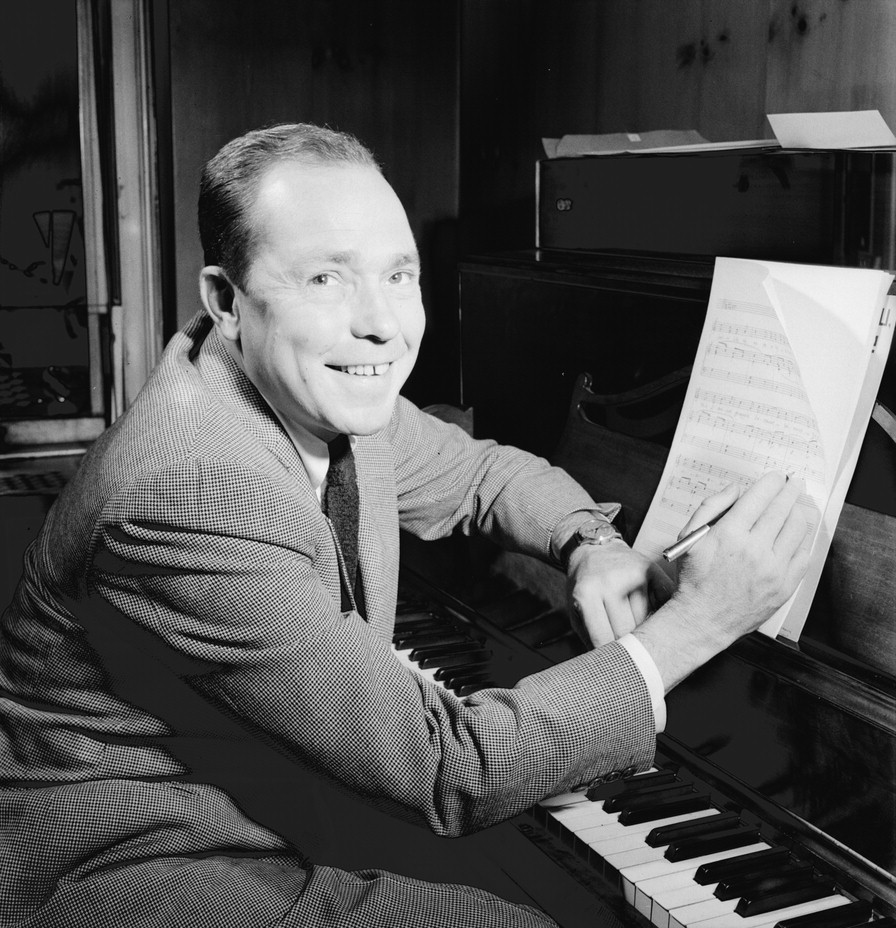
Johnny Mercer, Best Song co-winner

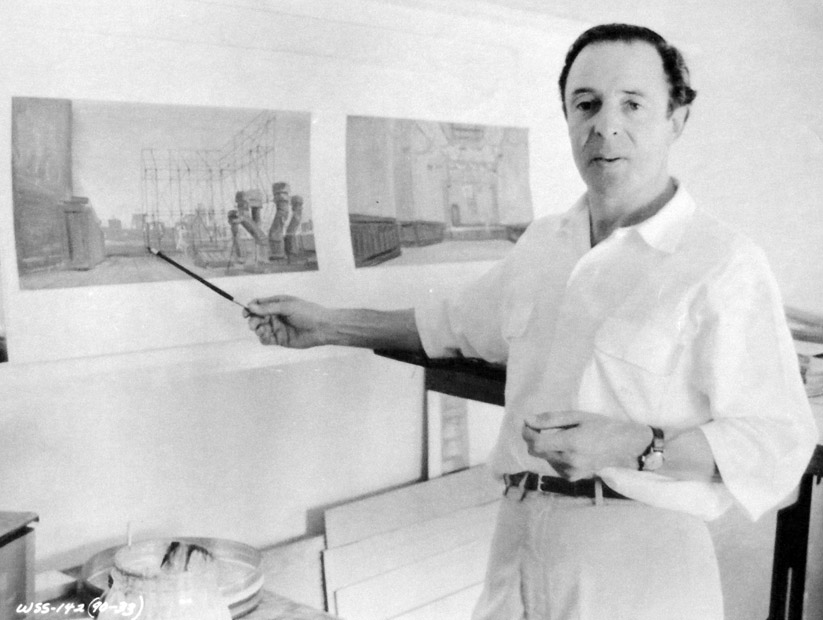
Boris Leven, Best Art Direction, Color co-winner

Nominations announced on February 26, 1962. Winners are listed first and highlighted with boldface.

**Best Motion Picture**: **West Side Story – Robert Wise, producer**; Fanny – Joshua Logan, producer; The Guns of Navarone – Carl Foreman, producer; The Hustler – Robert Rossen, producer; Judgment at Nuremberg – Stanley Kramer, producer	**Best Directing**: **Robert Wise and Jerome Robbins – West Side Story**; Federico Fellini – La Dolce Vita; J. Lee Thompson – The Guns of Navarone; Robert Rossen – The Hustler; Stanley Kramer – Judgment at Nuremberg
**Best Actor**: **Maximilian Schell – Judgment at Nuremberg as Hans Rolfe**; Charles Boyer – Fanny as César; Paul Newman – The Hustler as Eddie Felson; Spencer Tracy – Judgment at Nuremberg as Dan Haywood; Stuart Whitman – The Mark as Jim Fuller	**Best Actress**: **Sophia Loren – Two Women as Cesira**; Audrey Hepburn – Breakfast at Tiffany's as Holly Golightly; Piper Laurie – The Hustler as Sarah Packard; Geraldine Page – Summer and Smoke as Alma Winemiller; Natalie Wood – Splendor in the Grass as Wilma Dean "Deanie" Loomis
**Best Actor in a Supporting Role**: **George Chakiris – West Side Story as Bernardo**; Montgomery Clift – Judgment at Nuremberg as Rudolph Peterson; Peter Falk – Pocketful of Miracles as Joy Boy; Jackie Gleason – The Hustler as Minnesota Fats; George C. Scott – The Hustler as Bert Gordon	**Best Actress in a Supporting Role**: **Rita Moreno – West Side Story as Anita**; Fay Bainter – The Children's Hour as Mrs. Amelia Tilford; Judy Garland – Judgment at Nuremberg as Irene Hoffmann-Wallner; Lotte Lenya – The Roman Spring of Mrs. Stone as Contessa; Una Merkel – Summer and Smoke as Mrs. Winemiller
**Best Writing (Story and Screenplay -- Written Directly for the Screen)**: **Splendor in the Grass – William Inge**; Ballad of a Soldier – Valentin Yezhov and Grigori Chukhrai; La Dolce Vita – Federico Fellini, Tullio Pinelli, Ennio Flaiano and Brunello Rondi; General Della Rovere – Sergio Amidei, Diego Fabbri and Indro Montanelli; Lover Come Back – Stanley Shapiro and Paul Henning	**Best Writing (Screenplay -- Based on Material from Another Medium)**: **Judgment at Nuremberg – Abby Mann**; Breakfast at Tiffany's – George Axelrod; The Guns of Navarone – Carl Foreman; The Hustler – Robert Rossen and Sidney Carroll; West Side Story – Ernest Lehman
**Best Foreign Language Film**: **Through a Glass Darkly (Sweden)**; Harry and the Butler (Denmark); Immortal Love (Japan); The Important Man (Mexico); Plácido (Spain)	**Best Documentary (Feature)**: **Sky Above and Mud Beneath – Arthur Cohn and René Lafuite**; The Grand Olympics – dell Istituto Nazionale Luce, Comitato Organizzatore Del Giochi Della XVII Olimpiade
**Best Documentary (Short Subject)**: **Project Hope – Frank P. Bibas**; Breaking the Language Barrier – United States Air Force; Cradle of Genius – Jim O'Connor and Tom Hayes; Kahl – Dido-Film-GmbH; The Man in Gray – Benedetto Benedetti	**Best Short Subject (Live Action)**: **Seawards the Great Ships – Templar Film Studios**; The Face of Jesus – John D. Jennings; Play Ball! – Ciné-Documents; Rooftops of New York – Robert Gaffney; Very Nice, Very Nice – National Film Board of Canada
**Best Short Subject (Cartoon)**: **Surogat – Zagreb Film**; Aquamania – Walt Disney; Beep Prepared – Chuck Jones; Nelly's Folly – Chuck Jones; The Pied Piper of Guadalupe – Friz Freleng	**Best Music (Music Score of a Dramatic or Comedy Picture)**: **Breakfast at Tiffany's – Henry Mancini**; El Cid – Miklós Rózsa; Fanny – Morris Stoloff and Harry Sukman; The Guns of Navarone – Dimitri Tiomkin; Summer and Smoke – Elmer Bernstein
**Best Music (Scoring of a Musical Picture)**: **West Side Story – Saul Chaplin, Johnny Green, Sid Ramin and Irwin Kostal**; Babes in Toyland – George Bruns; Flower Drum Song – Alfred Newman and Ken Darby; Khovanshchina – Dmitri Shostakovich; Paris Blues – Duke Ellington	**Best Music (Song)**: **"Moon River" from Breakfast at Tiffany's – Music by Henry Mancini; Lyric by Johnny Mercer**; "Bachelor in Paradise" from Bachelor in Paradise – Music by Henry Mancini; Lyric by Mack David; "Love Theme from El Cid (The Falcon and the Dove)" from El Cid – Music by Miklós Rózsa; Lyric by Paul Francis Webster; "Pocketful of Miracles" from Pocketful of Miracles – Music by Jimmy Van Heusen; Lyric by Sammy Cahn; "Town Without Pity" from Town Without Pity – Music by Dimitri Tiomkin; Lyric by Ned Washington
**Best Sound**: **West Side Story – Gordon E. Sawyer and Fred Hynes**; The Children's Hour – Gordon E. Sawyer; Flower Drum Song – Waldon O. Watson; The Guns of Navarone – John Cox; The Parent Trap – Robert O. Cook	**Best Art Direction (Black-and-White)**: **The Hustler – Art Direction: Harry Horner; Set Decoration: Gene Callahan**; The Absent-Minded Professor – Art Direction: Carroll Clark; Set Decoration: Emile Kuri and Hal Gausman; The Children's Hour – Art Direction: Fernando Carrere; Set Decoration: Edward G. Boyle; La Dolce Vita – Art Direction and Set Decoration: Piero Gherardi; Judgment at Nuremberg – Art Direction: Rudolph Sternad; Set Decoration: George Milo
**Best Art Direction (Color)**: **West Side Story – Art Direction: Boris Leven; Set Decoration: Victor A. Gangelin**; Breakfast at Tiffany's – Art Direction: Hal Pereira and Roland Anderson; Set Decoration: Samuel M. Comer and Ray Moyer; El Cid – Art Direction and Set Decoration: Veniero Colasanti and John Moore; Flower Drum Song – Art Direction: Alexander Golitzen and Joseph C. Wright; Set Decoration: Howard Bristol; Summer and Smoke – Art Direction: Hal Pereira and Walter H. Tyler; Set Decoration: Samuel M. Comer and Arthur Krams	**Best Cinematography (Black-and-White)**: **The Hustler – Eugen Schüfftan**; The Absent-Minded Professor – Edward Colman; The Children's Hour – Franz Planer; Judgment at Nuremberg – Ernest Laszlo; One, Two, Three – Daniel L. Fapp
**Best Cinematography (Color)**: **West Side Story – Daniel L. Fapp**; Fanny – Jack Cardiff; Flower Drum Song – Russell Metty; A Majority of One – Harry Stradling; One-Eyed Jacks – Charles Lang	**Best Costume Design (Black-and-White)**: **La Dolce Vita – Piero Gherardi**; The Children's Hour – Dorothy Jeakins; Claudelle Inglish – Howard Shoup; Judgment at Nuremberg – Jean Louis; Yojimbo – Yoshirō Muraki
**Best Costume Design (Color)**: **West Side Story – Irene Sharaff**; Babes in Toyland – Bill Thomas; Back Street – Jean Louis; Flower Drum Song – Irene Sharaff; Pocketful of Miracles – Edith Head and Walter Plunkett	**Best Film Editing**: **West Side Story – Thomas Stanford**; Fanny – William H. Reynolds; The Guns of Navarone – Alan Osbiston; Judgment at Nuremberg – Frederic Knudtson; The Parent Trap – Philip W. Anderson
**Best Special Effects**: **The Guns of Navarone – Visual Effects by Bill Warrington; Audible Effects by Vivian C. Greenham**; The Absent-Minded Professor – Visual Effects by Robert A. Mattey and Eustace Lycett

=== Honorary Awards ===
- To William L. Hendricks for his outstanding patriotic service in the conception, writing and production of the Marine Corps film, A Force in Readiness, which has brought honor to the Academy and the motion picture industry.
- To Fred L. Metzler for his dedication and outstanding service to the Academy of Motion Picture Arts and Sciences.
- To Jerome Robbins for his brilliant achievements in the art of choreography on film.

=== Jean Hersholt Humanitarian Award ===
- George Seaton

=== Irving G. Thalberg Memorial Award ===
- Stanley Kramer

== Presenters and performers ==
=== Presenters ===
- Eddie Albert and Dina Merrill (Presenters: Costume Design Awards)
- Fred Astaire (Presenter: Best Picture)
- Carroll Baker and Richard Chamberlain (Presenters: Art Direction Awards)
- Charles Brackett (Presenter: Jean Hersholt Humanitarian Award to George Seaton)
- Macdonald Carey and Shirley Knight (Presenters: Best Special Effects)
- George Chakiris and Carolyn Jones (Presenters: Documentary Awards)
- Cyd Charisse and Tony Martin (Presenters: Music Awards)
- Wendell Corey (Presenter: Honorary Award to Fred L. Metzler)
- Joan Crawford (Presenter: Best Actor)
- Angie Dickinson and Rod Taylor (Presenter: Best Film Editing)
- Vince Edwards and Shelley Winters (Presenters: Cinematography Awards)
- Anthony Franciosa and Joanne Woodward (Presenters: Best Sound Recording)
- Arthur Freed (Presenter: Irving G. Thalberg Memorial Award to Stanley Kramer)
- Greer Garson (Presenter: Honorary Award to William L. Hendricks
- George Hamilton and Glynis Johns (Presenters: Short Subjects Awards)
- Rock Hudson (Presenter: Best Supporting Actress)
- Eric Johnston (Presenter: Best Foreign Language Film)
- Shirley Jones (Presenter: Best Supporting Actor)
- Gene Kelly (Presenter: Honorary Award to Jerome Robbins)
- Burt Lancaster (Presenter: Best Actress)
- Jack Lemmon and Lee Remick (Presenters: Writing Awards)
- Debbie Reynolds (Presenter: Best Original Song)
- Rosalind Russell (Presenter: Best Director)

=== Performers ===
- Ann-Margret ("Bachelor in Paradise" from Bachelor in Paradise)
- Gogi Grant ("Pocketful of Miracles" from Pocketful of Miracles)
- Johnny Mathis ("Love Theme from El Cid (The Falcon and the Dove)" from El Cid)
- Gene Pitney ("Town Without Pity" from Town Without Pity)
- Andy Williams ("Moon River" from Breakfast at Tiffany's)

== Multiple nominations and awards ==
Films with multiple nominations
Nominations	Film
11	Judgment at Nuremberg
11	West Side Story
9	The Hustler
7	The Guns of Navarone
5	Breakfast at Tiffany's
5	The Children's Hour
5	Fanny
5	Flower Drum Song
4	La Dolce Vita
4	Summer and Smoke
3	The Absent-Minded Professor
3	El Cid
3	Pocketful of Miracles
2	Babes in Toyland
2	The Parent Trap
2	Splendor in the Grass

Films with multiple awards
Awards	Film
10	West Side Story
2	Breakfast at Tiffany's
2	The Hustler
2	Judgment at Nuremberg

== See also ==
- 19th Golden Globe Awards
- 1961 in film
- 4th Grammy Awards
- 13th Primetime Emmy Awards
- 14th Primetime Emmy Awards
- 15th British Academy Film Awards
- 16th Tony Awards
