= 1962 Academy Awards =

1962 Academy Awards may refer to:

- 34th Academy Awards, the Academy Awards ceremony that took place in 1962
- 35th Academy Awards, the 1963 ceremony honoring the best in film for 1962
