= Laurel Springs =

Laurel Springs may refer to:

- Laurel Springs, New Jersey
  - Laurel Springs School District
- Laurel Springs, North Carolina

== See also ==
- Laurel Springs Ranch, California
- Laurel Springs School, California
- Laurel Spring
