= Mt. Olympus, Los Angeles =

Neighborhood in Los Angeles, California, United States

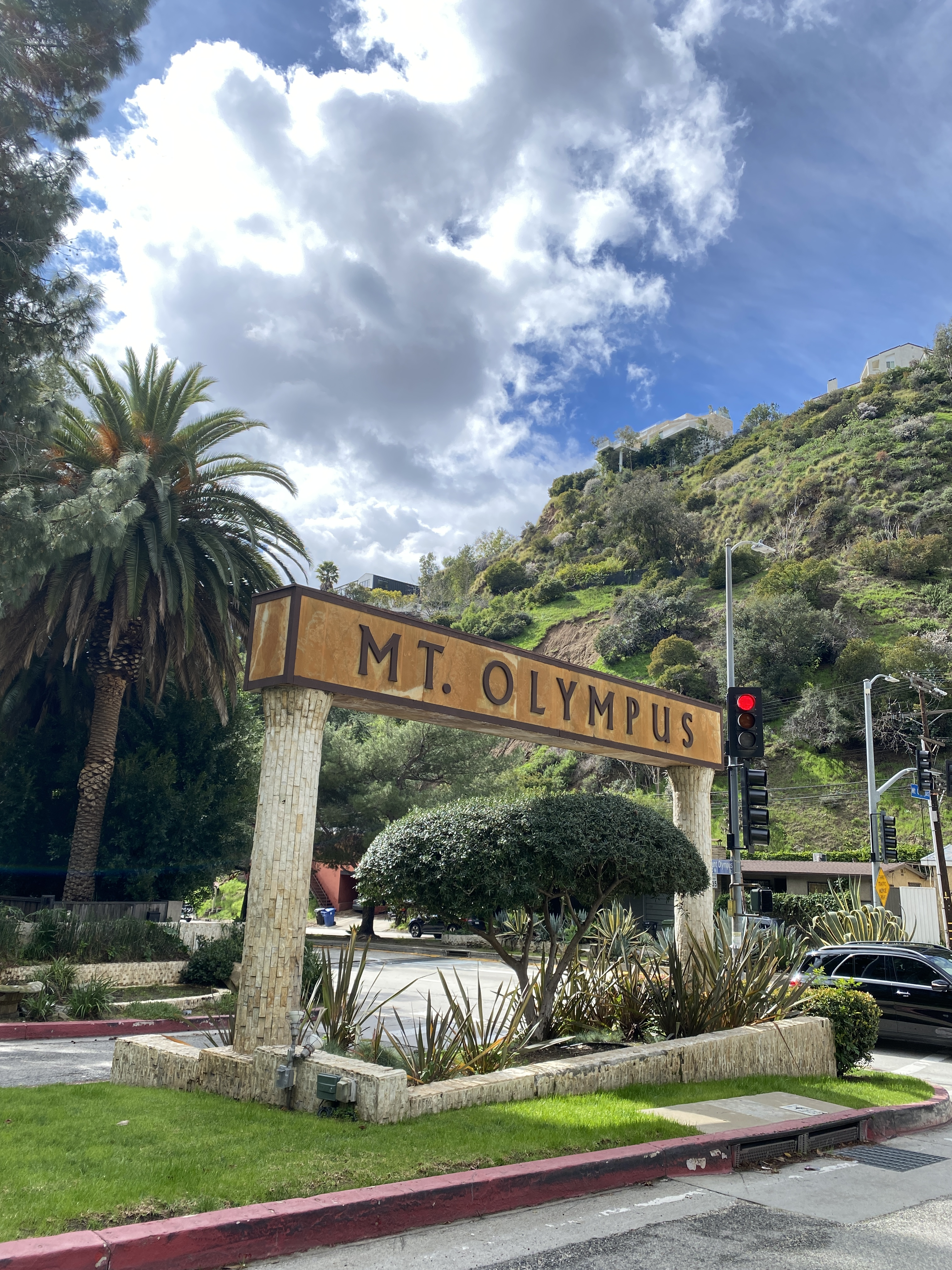
Mt. Olympus, Los Angeles

Mt. Olympus is a neighborhood in the Hollywood Hills area of the city of Los Angeles, California. Considered a subdistrict of Laurel Canyon, the 300-acre (120 ha) neighborhood is known for its upscale housing and wide streets. Mt. Olympus can be reached by taking Laurel Canyon Blvd. to Mt. Olympus Drive.

Developed in the 1960s, around the same time as nearby Trousdale Estates, the entrance gate has decorative "Greek columns", walls and fountains at some intersections with quasi-Greco architecture, streets (Apollo Drive, Achilles Drive, Electra Drive, Hercules Drive, Jupiter Drive, Oceanus Drive, Venus Drive, Vulcan Drive, and Zeus Drive) named for figures of Greco-Roman mythology, e.g., Apollo, Achilles, Electra, Hercules, Jupiter, Oceanus, Venus, Vulcan, and Zeus. A 2013 edition of the Rough Guide to Los Angeles described the development's design as an "exercise in 1970s vulgarity that is to Neoclassical architecture what a toga party is to ancient drama, with faux palazzos, pseudo-Roman statuary, goofy marble urns, and snarling stone lions added pell-mell to charmless stucco boxes". One architectural history of California described it as "reminiscent of Las Vegas casinos," with slightly smaller lots and a tackier look compared to Trousdale.

There are approximately three houses per acre in Mt. Olympus. The neighborhood is subject to periodic mudslides. The street trees are Japanese pines or Italian cypresses. The Mount Olympus neighborhood is bounded by Laurel Canyon Boulevard and Nichols Canyon Road.

== History ==
The name Mt. Olympus predates the housing development, as there is a reference to the Mt. Olympus "three miles west of Cahuenga Pass and at the head of Laurel Cañon" in 1888. An 1894 newspaper article datelined "Little Mount Olympus, Los Angeles County" mentions establishing a spring in Laurel Canyon in 1875, possibly Laurel Spring.

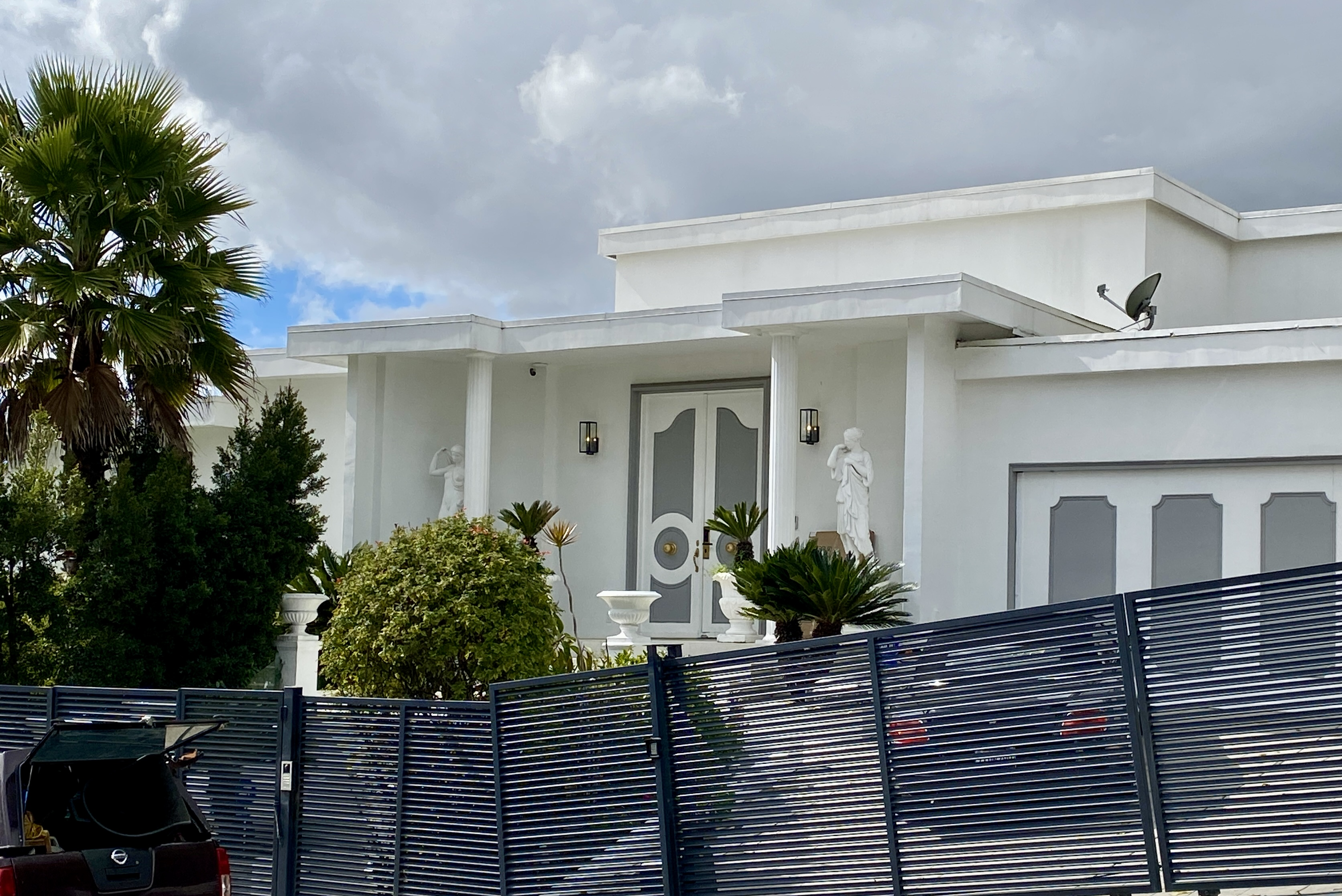
Exterior decor in coordination with neighborhood theme

The land that became Mt. Olympus was known as "goatland" before it was developed, meaning it was a steeply sloped area hosting mostly scrub and sage. The groundbreaking for Mt. Olympus took place in June 1963, followed by a cocktail reception at Grauman's Chinese. The developers were Russ Vincent and Al Hess, who simultaneously marketed tracts called Hollywood Oasis, Dor-Mar Estates, and Willow Hills North. Prior to his real estate career, Russ Vincent had been a Hollywood actor.

Early reports had it that scraping flat building sites out of the hill would require moving 12,000,000 yd^{3} (9,200,000 m^{3}) of earth.

== In popular culture ==
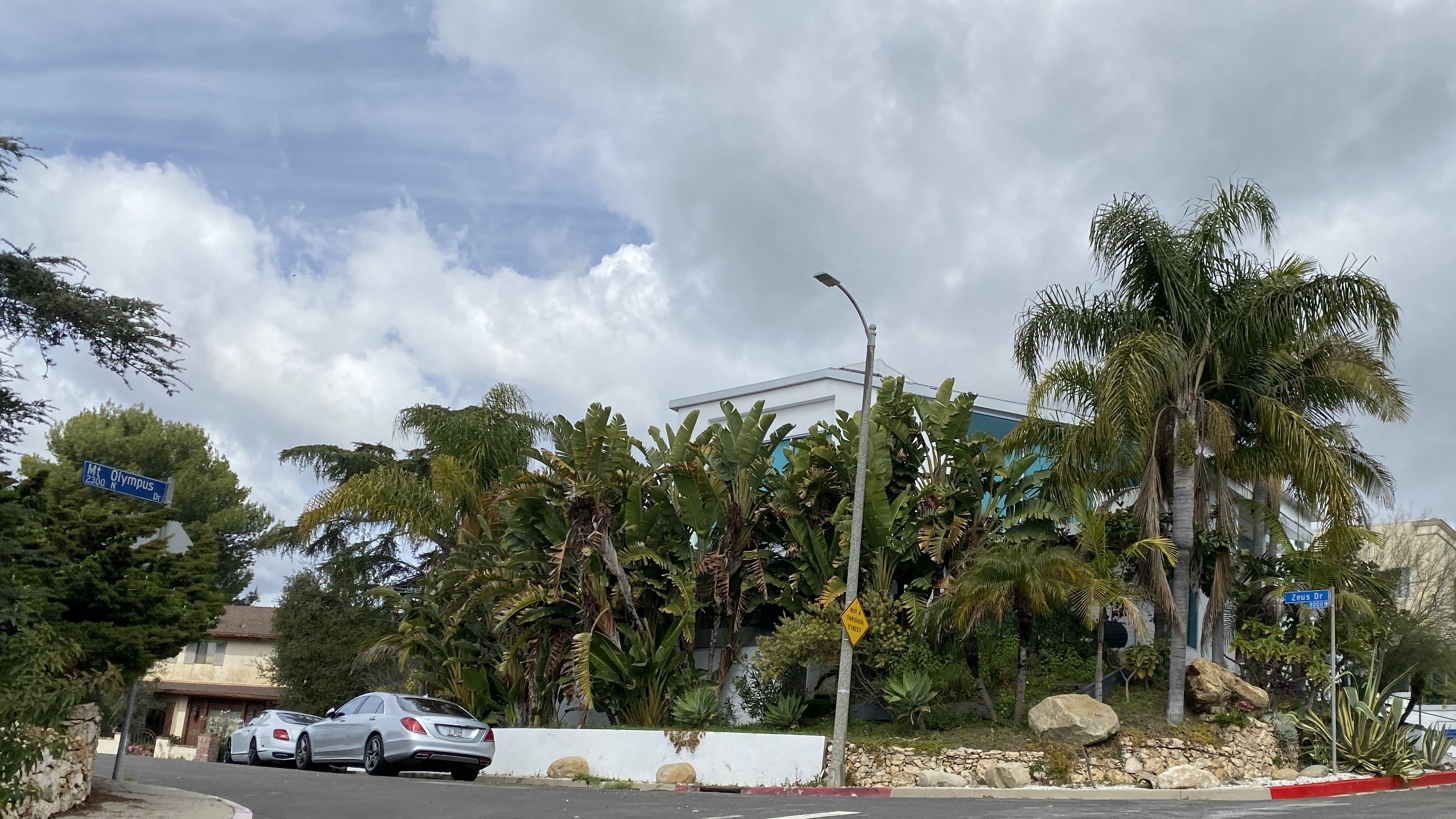
Corner of Mt. Olympus and Zeus

The community was featured in the film Hollywood Homicide (2003).

== See also ==
- Mount Lee
