= Breaking the Language Barrier =

1961 film

- Production company: Lookout Mountain Air Force Station
- Distributed by: United States Air Force
- Release date: 1961
- Country: United States
- Language: English

Breaking the Language Barrier is a 1961 American short documentary film. It was nominated for an Academy Award for Best Documentary Short. Hermon Lee Knox served as Director of Photography.

According to a declassified National Reconnaissance Office document, "Although the film failed to win an Oscar when the Academy of Motion Picture Arts and Sciences presented its annual awards on April 9, 1962, Headquarters APCS and the 1352nd Photographic Group received plaques honoring the nomination of the film for consideration in the competition. In the 1962 competition held by the magazine Industrial Photography for motion pictures in the In-Plant Category, Breaking the Language Barrier, selected as the USAF entry, tied with The Idea of Michigan (Univ. of Michigan Television Center) as the best general public-relations films. The announcement of the award was made in September 1962.

== See also ==
- List of American films of 1961
