= The Guns of Navarone (film) =

1961 epic adventure war film by J. Lee Thompson

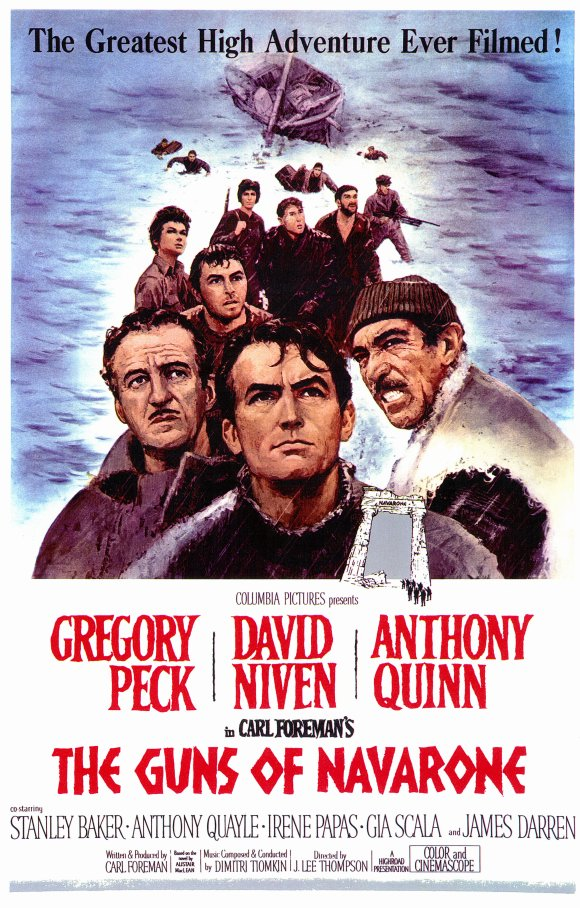
- Theatrical release poster
- Directed by: J. Lee Thompson
- Screenplay by: Carl Foreman
- Based on: The Guns of Navarone (1957 novel) by Alistair MacLean
- Produced by: Carl Foreman
- Starring: Gregory Peck; David Niven; Anthony Quinn; Stanley Baker; Anthony Quayle; Irene Papas; Gia Scala; James Darren
- Cinematography: Oswald Morris
- Edited by: Alan Osbiston
- Music by: Dimitri Tiomkin
- Production company: Highroad Productions
- Distributed by: Columbia Pictures
- Release dates: 27 April 1961 (London); 28 April 1961 (UK); 22 June 1961 (US)
- Running time: 157 minutes
- Country: United Kingdom; United States
- Language: English
- Budget: $6 million
- Box office: $28.9 million

The Guns of Navarone is a 1961 epic adventure war film directed by J. Lee Thompson, written and produced by Carl Foreman, and starring Gregory Peck, David Niven and Anthony Quinn, along with Stanley Baker, Anthony Quayle, Irene Papas, Gia Scala, and James Darren. It is an adaptation of Alistair MacLean's 1957 novel. The film follows the efforts of an Allied commando unit to destroy a seemingly impregnable German fortress that threatens Allied naval ships in the Aegean Sea.

A British and American co-production, the film was released by Columbia Pictures on 28 April 1961. It was a widespread critical and commercial success, and was the second top-grossing film of 1961. At the 34th Academy Awards, the film was nominated in six categories including for Best Picture, Best Director, and Best Adapted Screenplay; and won for Best Special Effects. Dimitri Tiomkin's score won the Golden Globe Award for Best Original Score.

A sequel film, Force 10 from Navarone, was released in 1978.

== Plot ==
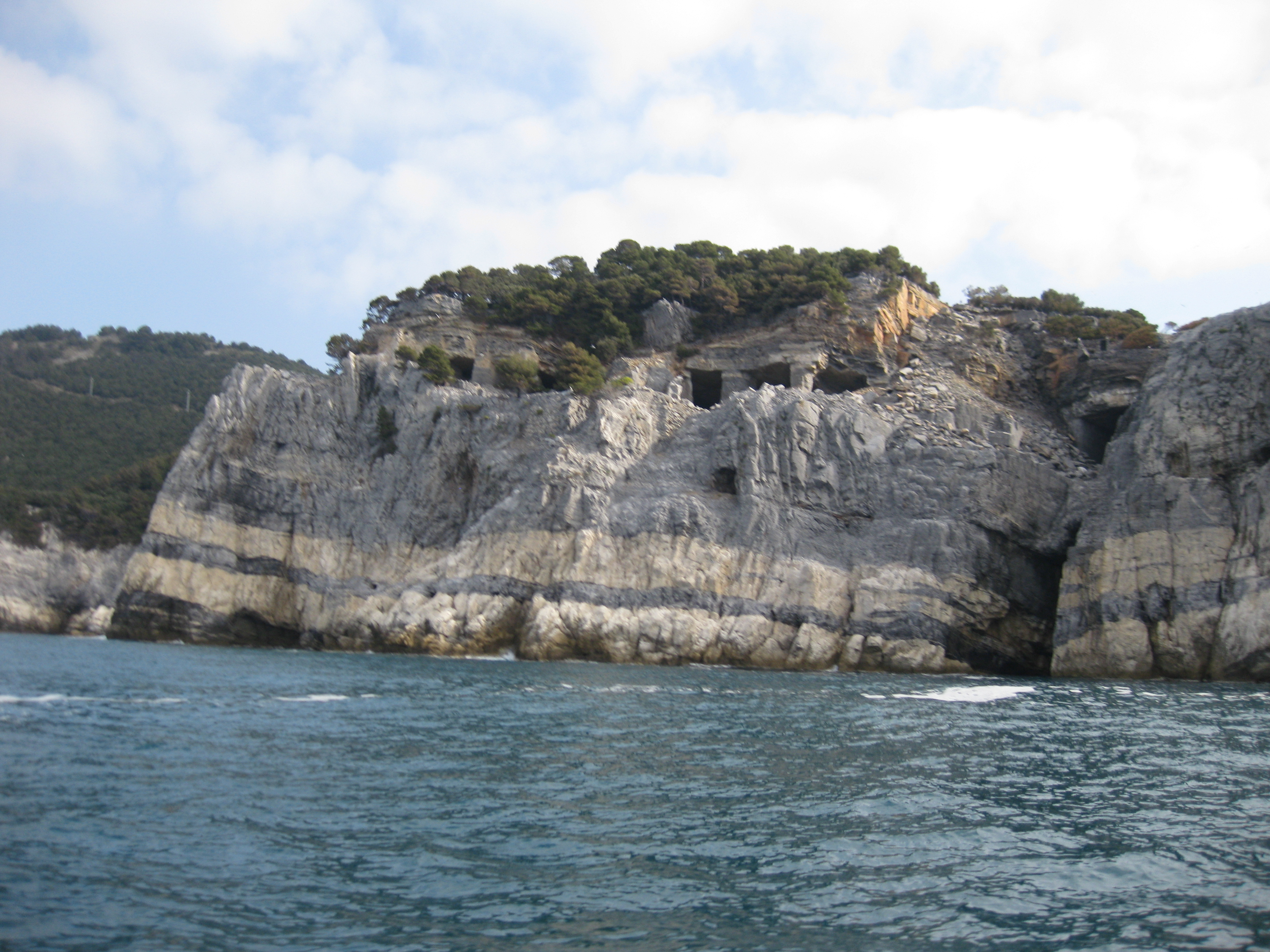
Cliffs of 'Navarone', showing how the openings to gun positions were portrayed in the film by marble quarries on the island of Palmaria, off the west coast of Italy

In 1943, the Axis powers plan an assault on the island of Keros, where 2,000 British soldiers are marooned, hoping to convince neutral Turkey to join them. Rescue by the Royal Navy is prevented by two enormous radar-directed large-calibre guns on Navarone Island. Aerial bombing fails to destroy the guns and Allied Intelligence assigns a commando unit to infiltrate Navarone and destroy the guns. Led by Major Roy Franklin, the team is composed of Captain Keith Mallory, an ex-spy and an officer with the Long Range Desert Group; Colonel Andrea Stavros from the Greek Army; Franklin's friend Corporal John Miller, an explosives expert and chemistry professor; Greco-American Spyros Pappadimos, a former criminal and native of Navarone; and Casey "The Butcher of Barcelona" Brown, an engineer and knife fighter.

Disguised as Greek fishermen they cross the Aegean Sea and overwhelm the crew of a German patrol boat. Mallory confides to Franklin that Stavros has sworn to kill him after the war, because Mallory was inadvertently responsible for the deaths of Stavros's wife and children. After being shipwrecked on the coast of Navarone, Mallory leads the team up the cliff and Franklin injures his leg. Mallory stops Franklin's attempt to kill himself, and lies that their mission has been scrubbed in favour of an amphibious assault. They rendezvous with two resistance fighters, Spyros's sister Maria and her friend Anna, who had been tortured by the Germans before escaping.

The group is captured trying to find a doctor for Franklin's gangrenous leg. They overpower their captors and escape in German uniforms, leaving Franklin behind to receive medical attention. Franklin is injected with scopolamine and repeats Mallory's misinformation. The Germans redeploy forces from the fortress, to counter the anticipated coastal landing. In the village of Navarone, Miller discovers his explosives have been sabotaged by Anna who confesses the Germans recruited her in exchange for her release. Maria shoots her dead before Mallory can execute her.

Mallory and Miller infiltrate the gun position while Stavros and Spyros create distractions in town. Maria and Brown steal a boat for their escape. Spyros dies in a shootout with a German officer, and Brown is stabbed during the boat theft. Mallory and Miller plant explosives on the guns and prepare a booby trap on the track of an ammunition hoist. The Germans force entry into the gun emplacement and defuse the explosives planted on the guns as Mallory and Miller escape down the cliff and into the stolen boat. A wounded Stavros is helped aboard by Mallory, resolving their feud.

Allied destroyers approach to rescue the trapped British troops and the Germans open fire on them. When the hoist reaches Miller's booby trap, the hidden explosives blast apart the fortress and the guns are silenced. Mallory's team is rescued by the British convoy. Stavros has fallen in love with Maria and returns to Navarone with her. Mallory and Miller observe the aftermath of their success from a destroyer en route to Keros.

== Cast ==
- Gregory Peck as Cpt. Keith Mallory, British Army
- David Niven as Cpl. John Anthony Miller, British Army
- Anthony Quinn as Col. Andrea Stavros, Hellenic Army
- Stanley Baker as Casey "Butcher" Brown
- Anthony Quayle as Maj. Roy Franklin, British Army
- James Darren as Spyros Pappadimos
- Irene Papas as Maria Pappadimos
- Gia Scala as Anna
- James Robertson Justice as Jensen (also opening narration)
- Richard Harris as S/L Howard Barnsby, RAAF
- Albert Lieven as Commandant
- Bryan Forbes as Cohn
- Allan Cuthbertson as Baker
- Walter Gotell as Muesel
- Norman Wooland as Group Captain
- Michael Trubshawe as Weaver
- Percy Herbert as Grogan
- George Mikell as Sessler
- Tutte Lemkow as Nicolai
- Cleo Scouloudi as Bride
- Christopher Rhodes as German Gunnery Officer

Peter Grant, future music manager of the Yardbirds, Led Zeppelin and Bad Company, played an uncredited British commando.

== Production ==
=== Writing and development ===
The film was part of a cycle of big-budget World War II adventures that included The Bridge on the River Kwai (1957), The Longest Day (1962), The Great Escape (1963) and Where Eagles Dare (1968). MacLean's novel had been a bestseller and was read by Mike Frankovich, head of Columbia Pictures, who became excited as to its cinematic possibilities. He showed it to Carl Foreman, who had written Bridge on the River Kwai and had a producing deal with Columbia, who was not as enthusiastic at first, in part because he knew how difficult making such a movie version would be. Foreman eventually changed his mind and agreed to make the movie. The novel had been inspired by the Battle of Leros, during the Dodecanese Campaign of World War II, but the guns on Leros were 152 mm (6 in), not the huge guns described in the book and the film. However, they may have been inspired by the four naval 305mm (12 inch) Obukhovskii 12"/52 Pattern 1907 guns, which were 15.85 metres long and installed by the Germans at the Batterie Mirus on the German-occupied island of Guernsey in 1942. The screenplay, adapted by producer Carl Foreman, made significant changes from the novel; these included changing the gender of the local resistance fighters and inventing a conflict between Mallory and Andrea. No women had appeared in the source novel: “Foreman had to invent two for the film. With MacLean’s permission, he added a Nazi-tortured schoolteacher (played by Gia Scala) and a young Greek partisan (Irene Papas) to supply the missing love interest.”

Foreman wanted to direct as well, but Columbia refused, insisting on a British director. The job went to Alexander Mackendrick (director of The Sweet Smell of Success), who said he "wanted to take what was essentially a typical, action-packed wartime melodrama and give it some pretentious overtones." Mackendrick left the production in March 1960, a week before shooting started, due to an alleged severe back ailment. It was later suggested he was fired by Foreman due to "creative differences". He was replaced by J. Lee Thompson, in part because star Gregory Peck was impressed by North West Frontier.

=== Casting ===
The role played by Niven was originally intended for Kenneth More. Foreman had written the part for More, but the head of Rank, John Davis, refused to lend More out for the film.

Richard Todd claimed that Foreman offered him a role, but Todd turned it down, as he felt the story was "far fetched" and he did not want to be cast in war movies although he had notably appeared as Guy Gibson in The Dambusters (1955) and would go on to play Major John Howard in The Longest Day (1962).

=== Filming ===
The Greek island of Rhodes provided locations — the unit was based there from April to July 1960. Quinn was so impressed with the area that he bought land nearby and later received additional land from the local government in gratitude for making the island famous; today the place is called Anthony Quinn Bay. Some further scenes were shot on the Maltese island of Gozo, and on Tino, in the Ligurian Sea. One of the warships in the film, the destroyer escort USS Slater, then a training ship in the Hellenic Navy known as Aetos (D-01), is preserved as a museum ship in Albany, New York.

As described by director Thompson in the DVD commentary track, David Niven became severely ill after shooting sequences in a dirty pool of water underneath the cave elevator and could have died from a serious infection, remaining in the hospital for some weeks as the crew completed other portions of the cave sequence. Since key scenes with Niven remained incomplete, and it was doubtful whether he would return to finish the film, the entire production was in jeopardy. Reshooting key scenes throughout the film with another actor and abandoning the project to collect the insurance were contemplated. Against medical advice, Niven felt obligated to complete his work and agreed to shoot and complete his scenes. However, he relapsed and did not recover for another seven weeks.

A complication arose when it was found that Gregory Peck, whose character was supposed to be fluent in German, could not speak the language convincingly. Voice actor Robert Rietty dubbed all of Peck's German dialogue for the film. The film's maps were created by Halas and Batchelor, a British team best known for their animated films. Although the island of Navarone is fictional, a map depicted in the film purporting to show the island of Navarone shows it as the real island of Antikythera. Several members of the Greek royal family visited the set the day the Mandrakos cafe scene was filmed and appear in the background as extras.

Fritz Bayerlein and Desmond Mangham served as technical advisers.

== Soundtrack ==
The film's score was composed by Dimitri Tiomkin and featured arrangements of several traditional songs.

- "The Guns of Navarone" (music by Dimitri Tiomkin, lyrics by Paul Francis Webster)
- "Karagouna" (traditional, arranged by Andreas Markides)
- "Ena Karavi Apo Ti Chio" (traditional, arranged by Andreas Markides)
- "Yalo Yalo" (traditional, arranged by Andreas Markides)
- "Treu Sein" (music by Dimitri Tiomkin, lyrics by Alfred Perry)
- "Das Sundenlied" (music by Dimitri Tiomkin, lyrics by Alfred Perry)

Tiomkin's theme song featured on the soundtrack album with lyrics recounting the film's plot. His theme became a popular instrumental with several cover versions including a 1965 version by The Skatalites. Other cover versions were performed by Johnny Griffin, Al Caiola and the Hollyridge Strings.

== Release ==
The Guns of Navarone had its Royal World Premiere in aid of the Edwina Mountbatten Trust and in the presence of Her Majesty Queen Elizabeth II and His Royal Highness Prince Philip, Duke of Edinburgh on 27 April 1961, at the Odeon Leicester Square in London's West End.

== Reception ==
=== Box office ===
The film grossed $28.9 million at the box office, generating theatrical rentals of $13 million in the United States and Canada, and was the second top-grossing film of 1961. It earned worldwide rentals of $25 million.

=== Critical response ===
Reviews were mostly positive; Bosley Crowther of The New York Times called the film "one of those muscle-loaded pictures in the thundering tradition of DeMille, which means more emphasis is placed on melodrama than on character or credibility." He added that while the film was predictable, "for anyone given to letting himself be entertained by scenes of explosive action and individual heroic displays, there should be entertainment in this picture, for there is plenty of all that in it." Variety wrote that the film was "the sort of spectacular drama that can ignore any TV competition and, even with its flaws, should have patrons firmly riveted throughout its lengthy narrative. With a bunch of weighty stars, terrific special effects, several socko situations plus good camerawork and other technical okays, Foreman and director J. Lee Thompson have sired a winner." Harrison's Reports gave a grade of "Excellent," stating: "The script, direction, acting (by a brilliant cast) and photography are all prizeworthy." Richard L. Coe of The Washington Post called the film "a magnificently detailed cliff-hanger of spectacular settings and deeds of impossible derring-do ... What makes this one of the good ones is superlative photography of the storied Grecian isles, a crackerjack cast and a yarn about WWII in which unlikely incident succeeds unlikely incident with rare largesse."

John L. Scott of the Los Angeles Times called it "the best adventure movie to hit the screen this year," adding, "Some viewers will deplore a lack of character motivation—the origins of the six heroes are passed by rather quickly at the beginning—and women may yearn for more romantic passages in the film—but most of us, I am sure, will be satisfied with the epic suspense and sweep of this highly pictorial adventure." Brendan Gill of The New Yorker called it one of those movies "that are no less thrilling because they are so preposterous ... Let me also confess that I was held more or less spellbound all the way through this many-colored rubbish". The Monthly Film Bulletin thought the film fell well short of its ambitions, finding that Foreman's script had "too much diffusion, too much talk, and too many themes raised and dropped, so that the adventure story is not lifted to another plane but overstretched, robbed of the tight narrative concentration needed for a mounting tension." The review also criticized director Thompson for lacking "the ability of the Hollywood veterans to hold a long picture together" and instead of moving the action forward "in a series of jerks." Stanley Kauffmann of The New Republic wrote, "The Guns of Navarone is a lively adventure picture full of vivid action, obviously contrived but effective suspense."

On the review aggregator website Rotten Tomatoes, 92% of 25 critics' reviews are positive. The website's consensus reads: "Bolstered by a cast of memorable stars and an impressive sense of scale, The Guns of the Navarone fires with vivid characterization and entertaining spectacle." Metacritic, which uses a weighted average, assigned the film a score of 72 out of 100, based on eight critics, indicating "generally favorable" reviews.

=== Accolades ===
Award	Category	Nominee(s)	Result	Ref.
Academy Awards	Best Motion Picture	Carl Foreman	Nominated	
Academy Awards	Best Director	J. Lee Thompson	Nominated	
Academy Awards	Best Screenplay – Based on Material from Another Medium	Carl Foreman	Nominated	
Academy Awards	Best Film Editing	Alan Osbiston	Nominated	
Academy Awards	Best Music Score of a Dramatic or Comedy Picture	Dimitri Tiomkin	Nominated	
Academy Awards	Best Sound	John Cox	Nominated	
Academy Awards	Best Special Effects	Bill Warrington and Chris Greenham	Won	
British Academy Film Awards	Best British Screenplay	Carl Foreman	Nominated	
Directors Guild of America Awards	Outstanding Directorial Achievement in Motion Pictures	J. Lee Thompson	Nominated	
Golden Globe Awards	Best Motion Picture – Drama		Won	
Golden Globe Awards	Best Director – Motion Picture	J. Lee Thompson	Nominated	
Golden Globe Awards	Best Original Score – Motion Picture	Dimitri Tiomkin	Won	
Grammy Awards	Best Soundtrack Album or Recording of Score from Motion Picture or Television	Dimitri Tiomkin	Nominated	
International Film Music Critics Awards	Best New Release, Re-Release or Re-Recording of an Existing Score	Dimitri Tiomkin and James Fitzpatrick	Nominated	
Laurel Awards	Top Drama		Won	
Laurel Awards	Top Male Dramatic Performance	Gregory Peck	Nominated	

The film is recognized by the American Film Institute in the following list:

- AFI's 100 Years...100 Thrills—#89

== Sequel ==
In 1968, author Alistair MacLean reunited Mallory, Miller, and Stavros in the best-selling novel Force 10 From Navarone, the only sequel of his long writing career. That was in turn filmed as the significantly different Force 10 from Navarone in 1978 by British director Guy Hamilton, a veteran of several James Bond films. The cast included Robert Shaw, Harrison Ford and Edward Fox. Though the sequel was a modest success, it did not match the original critically or commercially.

== In popular culture ==
- The Battlestar Galactica episode "The Gun on Ice Planet Zero" was directly inspired by this film.
- The 1981 video game Castle Wolfenstein was inspired by the film.
- "Assault on the Rock", an episode of the 1987 cartoon Spiral Zone, has a very similar plot, involving two enormous cannons (in this instance placed on the island of Gibraltar), that are a great menace to the Mediterranean and can only be reached by climbing the south cliff.
- The climax of the 1988 movie Commando is inspired by The Guns of Navarone.
- In the 2004 video game Call of Duty: United Offensive, a single player mission entitled "Sicily" is based in part on the scenery and events of the film, as well as the SAS attack on the Lamba Doria coastal gun battery during the Allied invasion of Sicily.
- On The Dick Van Dyke Show, in the episode "You're Under Arrest", Rob Petrie (Dick Van Dyke) claims to have fallen asleep while watching the film at a drive-in theater, an alibi of which the police are skeptical. In the episode "Bupkis", Petrie sings a song that he has written for The Alan Brady Show (the show-within-a-show in the series) titled "The Guns of Navarone" to an old army buddy
- In the Wu-Tang Forever double album, Method Man cites The Guns of Navarone in the track "Triumph"
- In Pulp Fiction, Jules Winnfield, played by Samuel L. Jackson, says to John Travolta's Vincent Vega: "Every time my fingers touch brain, I'm Superfly TNT. I'm The Guns of the [sic] Navarone."
- "Guns of Navarone" by the Jamaican band The Skatalites (1965) is a ska standard, which reached #36 in the British pop charts in 1968 and has been covered by many ska bands since.
- In the first Wallace & Gromit film, A Grand Day Out, before the rocket takes off the mice put on sunglasses, a reference to the German gunners putting on their goggles before the guns fire in this film.
- The movie was lampooned by The Rocky and Bullwinkle Show in a story arc called "The Guns of Abalone"
