= Chris Greenham =

- Born: Vivian C. Greenham; 21 April 1923; Oxfordshire, United Kingdom
- Died: 21 January 1989 (aged 65); Esher, United Kingdom
- Occupation: Sound editor

Chris Greenham (born Vivian C. Greenham) (21 April 1923 – 21 January 1989) was an Academy Award-winning English sound editor, known for his work on films including Superman, The Guns of Navarone and Born Free. He was the recipient of the Academy Award in 1962 for Best Effects for his work on The Guns of Navarone (shared with Bill Warrington).
