= Project Hope (film) =

1961 film

- Produced by: Frank P. Bibas
- Production companies: MacManus, John & Adams; Klaeger Film; Ex-Cell-O
- Distributed by: Modern Talking Picture Service and Association Films
- Release date: 1961
- Country: United States
- Language: English

Project Hope is a 1961 American short documentary film produced by Frank P. Bibas, documenting the maiden voyage of the SS Hope. At the 34th Academy Awards, held in 1962, it won an Oscar for Documentary Short Subject. The Academy Film Archive preserved Project Hope in 2006.
