= Laurel Spring =

Water source in California

- Lookout Mountain Spring
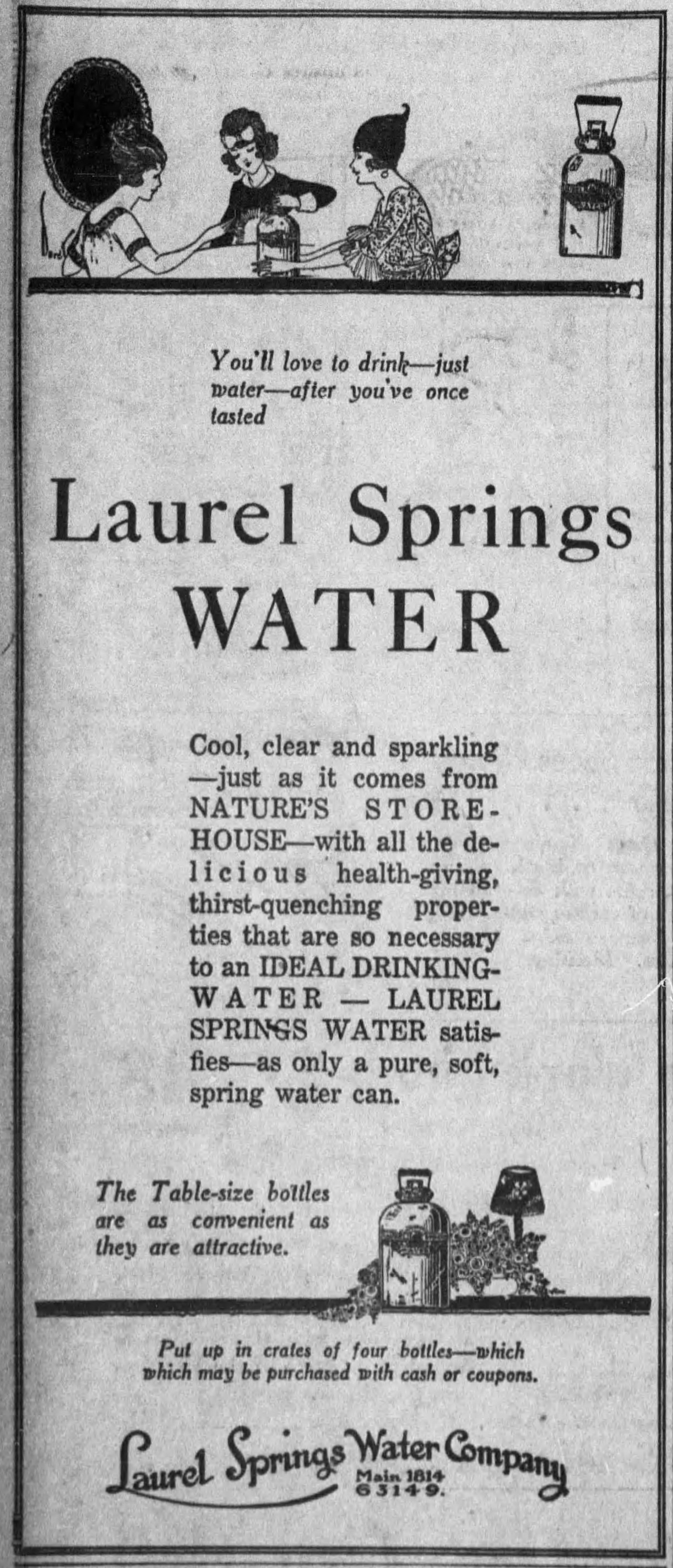
- Interactive map of Laurel Spring
- Coordinates: 34.1149°N 118.3747°W

Laurel Spring, also known as Lookout Mountain Spring, is a natural spring in Laurel Canyon, Los Angeles County, California, United States, in the Hollywood Hills section of the Santa Monica Mountains. A resort property was developed at the site in the early 20th century and it was later a private residence. In 2024, conservationists raised $1 million to purchase the 2.4-acre (0.97 ha) property surrounding the spring and create a protected area under the Santa Monica Mountains Recreation and Conservation Authority (MRCA).

== Description and history ==
Springs were reportedly being identified and developed in Laurel Canyon as early as 1875. In 1906, real estate developer Charles Spencer Mann bought a lot at 2401 Laurel Canyon Road and Lookout Mountain Avenue that hosted a running stream, a small cabin, and a "lone eucalyptus tree". The following year he built the Bungalow Inn as a mountain retreat. Advertisements for nearby residences in neighboring "Bungalow Land" promised "pure mountain water under pressure" from a spring water source. Circa 1920, there was a Laurel Springs Water company offering bottled spring water to Los Angeles consumers. By 1921 residents of Laurel Canyon sought annexation by the city of Los Angeles in order to gain access to the city's Owens River water supply.

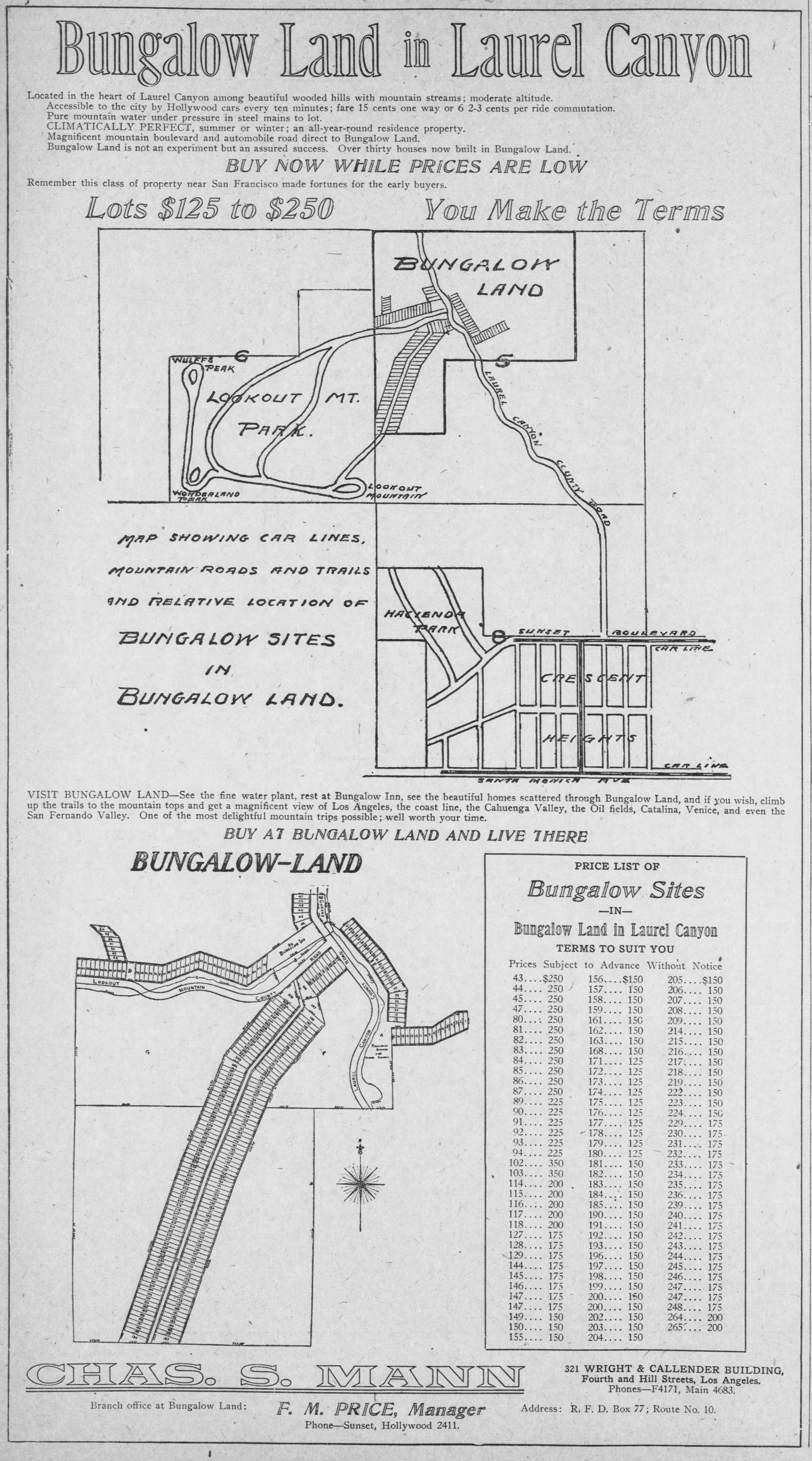
The spring-fed creek is visible in the lower map of the Bungalow Land development in Laurel Canyon

The property at Laurel Canyon Blvd. and Lookout Blvd. was eventually sold to actress Bessie Love, and then to the family that owned Milliron's Department Store. Musician Frank Zappa rented the property, then known as the Log Cabin, from owner Fania M. Pearson in 1968. The house burned in a fire in 1981; Pearson died in 1994. In 2024, conservationists raised $1 million to purchase the property and the Lookout Mountain spring from the current owners to preserve the water source and the surrounding wildlife corridor. The park will be administered by the Santa Monica Mountains Recreation Conservation Authority.

== See also ==
- Milliron's Westchester
- Tongva Sacred Springs
- Encino Hot Springs
- White Point Hot Springs
- Mt. Olympus, Los Angeles
