= Lookout Mountain Air Force Station =

Movie studio and residence in Los Angeles

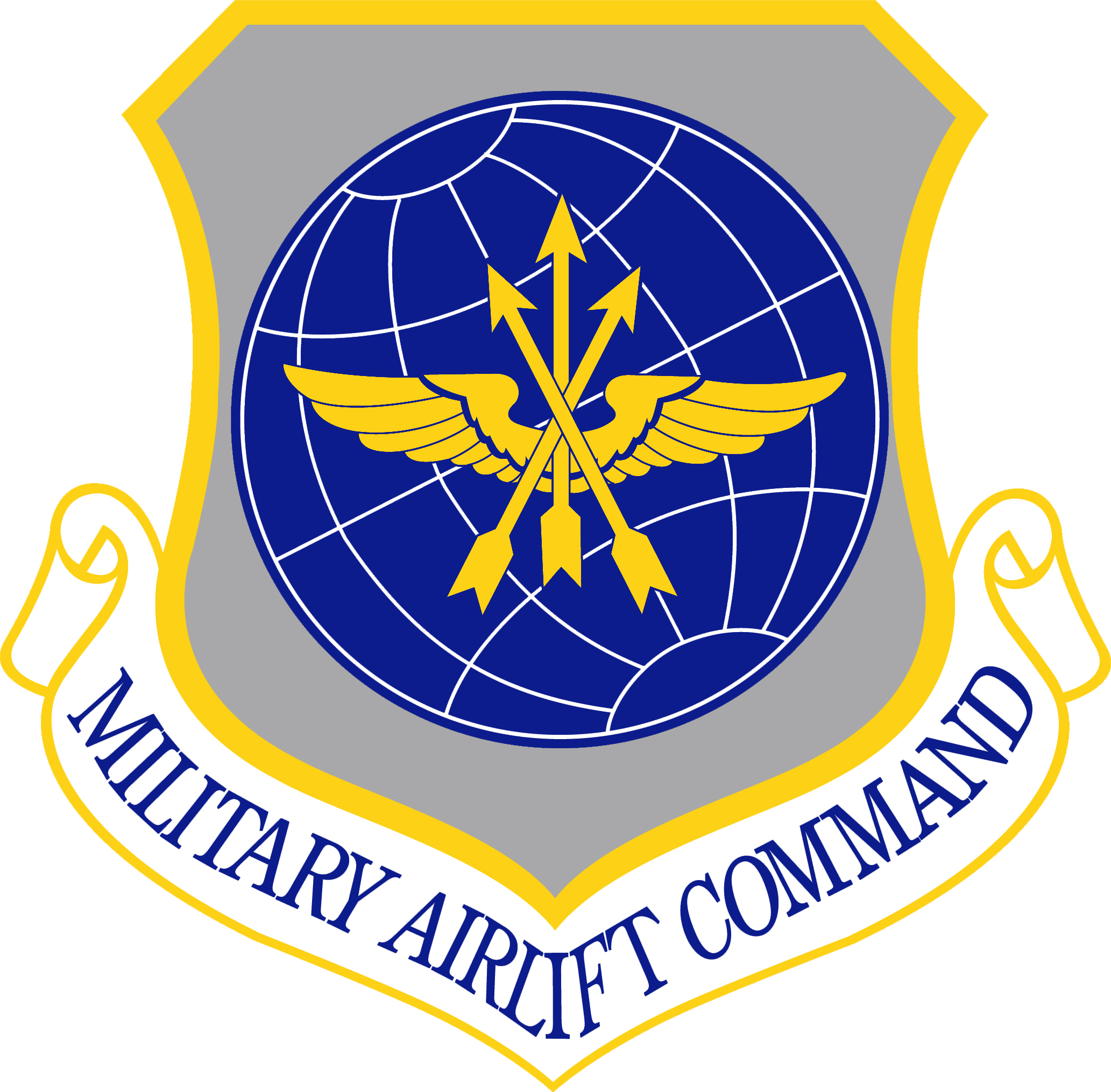
Lookout Mountain Air Force Station
- Part of Military Airlift Command (MAC)
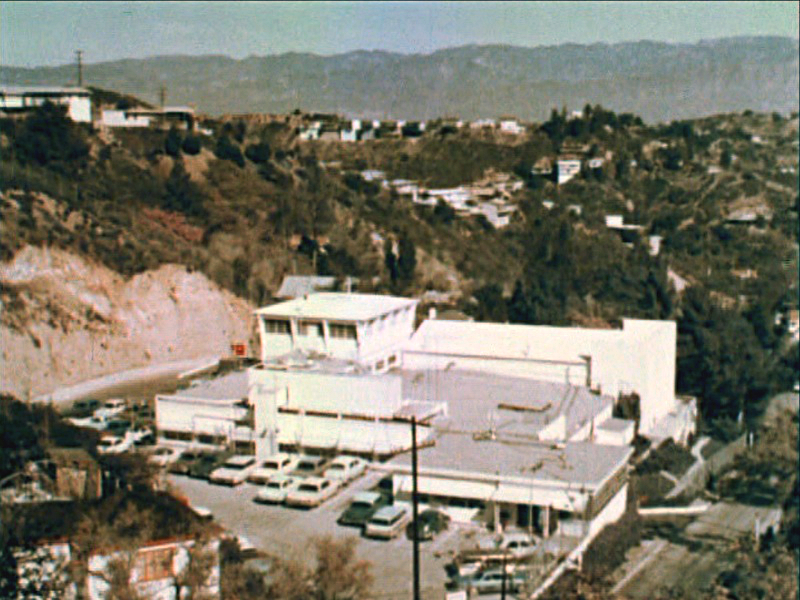
- Lookout Mountain Laboratory Air Force Station from above

Site information
- Type: Air Force Station
- Owner: Jared Leto
- Controlled by: United States Air Force

Location
- Location of Lookout Mountain AFS, California
- Coordinates: 34.108810°N 118.388588°W

Site history
- Built: 1941
- In use: 1947–1969

Garrison information
- Garrison: 1352nd Photographic Group

Lookout Mountain Air Force Station (LMAFS) is a Formerly Used Defense Site which today is a private residence of actor Jared Leto in the neighborhood of Lookout Mountain, Laurel Canyon, Los Angeles, California. The USAF military installation produced motion pictures and still photographs for the United States Department of Defense and the Atomic Energy Commission (AEC) from 1947 to 1969.

The 50,000 square feet (4,600 m^{2}) facility was built on 2.5 acres (1.0 ha) in 1941 as a World War II air defense center to coordinate radar installations in the Los Angeles area. When the studio was established in 1947, its purpose was kept secret. The studio consisted of one large sound stage, a film laboratory, two screening rooms, four editing rooms, an animation and still photo department, sound mixing studio, and numerous climate-controlled film vaults. Using the latest equipment, the studio could process both 35mm and 16mm color motion picture film as well as black and white and color still photographs. It was declared Los Angeles Historic-Cultural Monument number 1098 in 2015.

== History ==
=== 1947–1960 ===
Beginning with Trinity, the first nuclear test in 1945, there was a need to document nuclear testing with still and motion picture photography. The film was needed for the study and understanding of the behavior of nuclear weapons. In 1946, in support of Operation Crossroads, the first atomic bomb test in the Pacific, the joint task force conducting the test had assembled a provisional photographic unit of still and motion picture photographers to document the test. Most of these photographers were part of a small detachment of the First Motion Picture Unit from Long Island, New York.

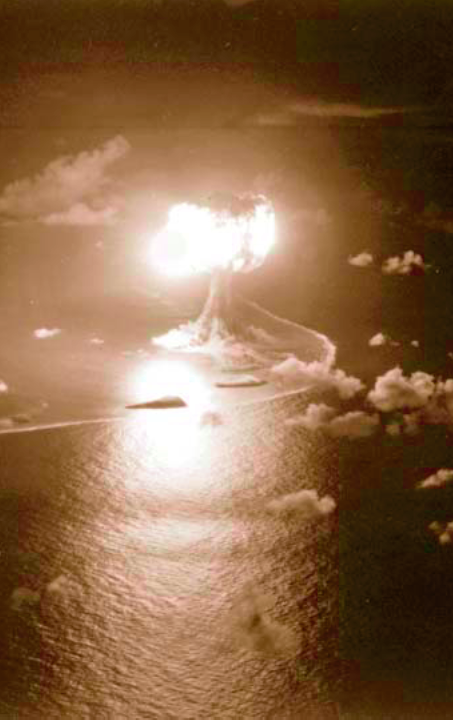
Operation Sandstone nuclear detonation

The 1st Motion Picture Unit ran from 1942–1945. A new 1st Motion Picture Unit was opened in Astoria, Queens, in 1947 with a detachment in Los Angeles. This would later be redesignated as the 4201st Motion Picture Squadron before closing in 1949. The Los Angeles detachment would then become the 4881st Motion Picture Unit under the Air Proving Ground.

After Operation Crossroads, it was determined that a permanent photographic unit, providing specialized photography and sound recording, should be established, trained and equipped to obtain scientific, technical and documentary photography of atomic bomb tests. Brigadier General P. T. Cullen, who had commanded the Air Photo Unit on Operation Crossroads, was directed to find a site in the Los Angeles area suitable for the accomplishment of motion picture documentation of Joint Task Force 7 (JTF-7), Operation Sandstone.

After an extensive survey of the Los Angeles area, the General chose the Air Force facility at 8935 Wonderland Avenue. The facility had been constructed on 2 acres (0.81 ha) of land in 1943 at a cost of $132,000 to house the Los Angeles Flight Control Center. After World War II, the Los Angeles Flight Control Center was closed and the grounds and building declared surplus to the needs of the Air Force. In the fall of 1947 the 1352d Motion Picture Squadron was activated at Lookout Mountain.

In January 1948, the building was acquired from the War Assets Administration by the Air Force and the Atomic Energy Commission for the Lookout Mountain Laboratory for use in support of JTF-7. Extensive remodeling commenced by the Los Angeles Office of the Army Corps of Engineers and was paid for by the AEC. One major modification was to install five individual fireproof vaults with a storage capacity of 3,500,000 feet (1,100,000 m) of 35mm film. Office equipment came from Air Force supply at San Bernardino, California, and technical equipment, in excess of $500,000, was obtained from the First Motion Picture Unit in New York and various Air Force photographic units.

During the period when Lookout Mountain Laboratory was used in support of JTF-7, it was under the command of the Second Air Division, which was commanded by General Cullen of the Strategic Air Command. Personnel consisted of 8 officers from the Air Force, Army, Navy and Marine Corps. Civilian photographers with Top Secret clearances were supplied by the Air Materiel Command and the Strategic Air Command on a Temporary duty assignment (TDY) basis, their salaries paid jointly by the AEC and the Air Force.

In the fall of 1949, Lt. General Curtis LeMay decided that the production of motion pictures was not a proper function of the Strategic Air Command. Lookout Mountain Laboratory and all its staff, were transferred to the Air Proving Ground under the command of Lt. General William Ellsworth Kepner.

In December 1949, Lookout Mountain Laboratory and the 4881st Motion Picture Squadron were assigned the responsibility for accomplishing all documentary photography for Joint Task Force 3, Operation Greenhouse. This was the first time that a photographic unit, specifically staffed and equipped for documentation of an atomic weapons test, existed during the planning stages of such test. As a result, it was possible to pre-plan the photography.

In June 1950, the United States Atomic Energy Commission, later the U.S. Department of Energy (DOE), made funds available for further construction at Lookout Mountain Laboratory. Between June 1950 and January 1, 1953, a new building covering approximately 31,000 square feet (2,900 m^{2}) was constructed, new motion picture processing equipment installed, more humidity controlled film vaults built, editing and screening rooms updated, a new still processing lab built and a sound stage added to the multistory building, much of which was underground having been built down into the mountain. It was agreed that the AEC would have the privilege of storing all existing AEC film pertaining to atomic weapons tests and development programs at Lookout Mountain free-of-charge. A final 1955 addition to the facility would establish new security, offices, and film processing and storage facilities. The new Lookout Mountain Lab facility had an estimated value of $1,500,000.

=== 1352nd Motion Picture Squadron ===
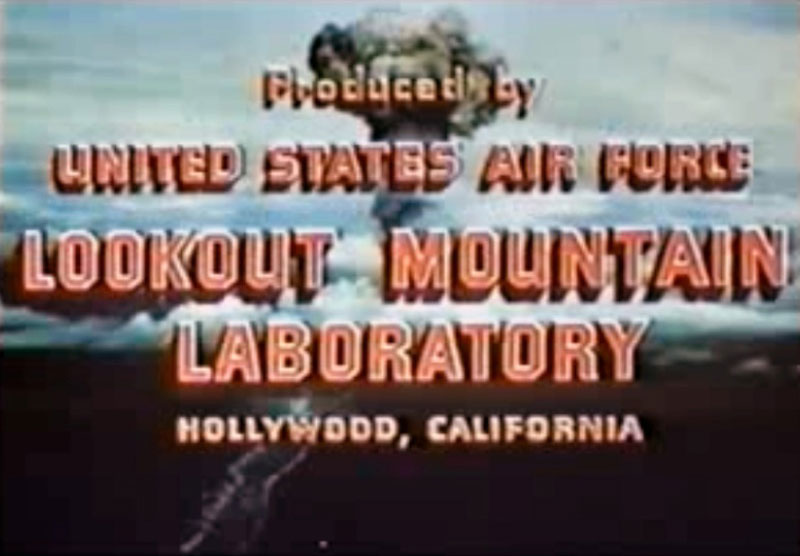
The production credit image from a film produced by United States Air Force Lookout Mountain Laboratory

On April 1, 1951 the Air Force established the Air Pictorial Service (APS) with the primary photo unit being the 4881st Motion Picture Squadron. All photography of atomic bomb tests was quickly transferred from the Air Proving Ground to the Air Pictorial Service which was under the command of Military Air Transport Service (MATS).

On April 16, 1952, the Air Pictorial Service was redesignated the Air Photographic and Charting Service (APCS). APCS was responsible for mapping the world and providing accurate aerial charts to military aviators of wherever they needed. It also produced all Air Force training films, public information films and monthly newsreels. On April 28, 1952, the 4881st Motion Picture Squadron at Lookout Mountain was redesignated the 1352nd Motion Picture Squadron, effective on May 1, 1952.

The mission of the newly formed 1352nd Motion Picture Squadron was: "...to provide in-service production of classified motion pictures and still photographs for the Department of the Air Force in support of the Atomic Energy program and to provide such additional production of motion picture and still photography as directed by the Commanding General, Air Pictorial Service." The 1352nd Squadron contrasted with other APCS units in that it participated much more in "joint" defense activities, particularly joint Atomic Energy Commission and Department of Defense nuclear operations. It was the only film unit in DoD to be attached to this activity, calling for more secrecy than other but allowing for relative independence from the APCS.

In the early 1950s Lookout Mountain was firmly established in reputation and practices. New projects were consistent, with films such as the influential "Operation Ivy" (1954) on the 1952 test and 42 additional film projects in 1954. In 1956, Lookout Mountain official reports described the 1352nd Squadron working again with missiles in collaboration with the Western Development Division of the Air Force's Air Research and Development Command. In the fall of that year, a studio crew was sent to film the United States Air Force Thunderbirds demonstration squadron, leading to the development of the M-45 Camera mount. This technology helped earn the studio an Academy Award nomination.

As the studio continued to expand, its importance to military operations continued to solidify. The Lookout Mountain crew helped to identify equipment failures with their footage for Douglas Aircraft Company and their 1957 Thor 101 missile. This would lead to a successful Thor missile launch in 1958.

=== 1958–1969 ===
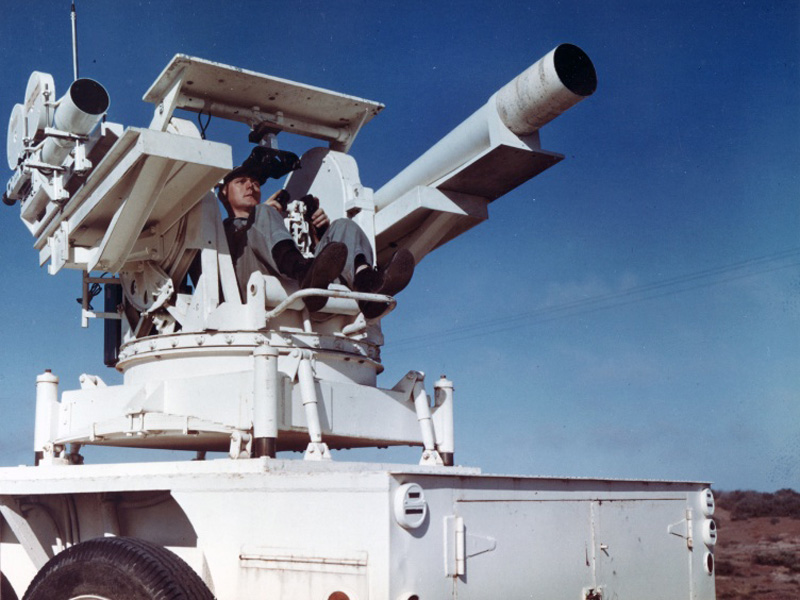
Lookout Mountain photographer on camera mount. A re-purposed M45 Quadmount

In March 1958, Lookout Mountain Laboratory was redesignated Lookout Mountain Air Force Station.

On July 1, 1960, the 1352d Motion Picture Squadron was re-designated as the 1352d Photographic Group with headquarters at Lookout Mountain Air Force Station (LMAFS), 8935 Wonderland Avenue in Los Angeles. The offices of the Commander, Executive, Administrative, Comptroller, Manpower, Procurement, Base Supply, Civilian and Military Personnel, and Information Office were located at the "Annex" at 10850 Riverside Drive, Suite 208 of the North Hollywood Federal Building in North Hollywood.

In January 1966 the Military Air Transport Service became the Military Airlift Command (MAC) with headquarters at Scott Air Force Base, Illinois. The Air Photographic and Charting Service became the Aerospace Audio Visual Service (AAVS) with headquarters at the 1365th Photographic Group, Orlando, AFB, Florida.

In March 1967, the 1352nd Photographic Group was composed of two squadrons, four Detachments (Det) and two Operating Locations (O/L). The squadrons were the 1369th Photo Squadron at Vandenberg Air Force Base, CA and the 600th Photo Sq, Tan Son Nhut Air Base, Saigon, South Vietnam. The Detachments and Operating Locations were: Det. 2 1352d Colorado Springs, Colorado, Det. 3 1352d Hickham Air Force Base, Hawaii, Det. 4 1352d El Segundo, CA, Det. 7 1352d March Air Force Base, CA, O/L 1 1352d Elmendorf Air Force Base, Alaska, O/L 1 Det. 3 Yamato, AS, Japan.

From 1960 to 1969, the 1352d Photo Group, Lookout Mountain Air Force Station, was responsible for all documentary photographic capabilities and the maintenance and operation of laboratories and production facilities in the western part of the United States (west of the Mississippi River), the Pacific and the Far East.

=== 1966–1975 ===
In 1966 the 1352 Photographic Group took on a new role, the documentation of the growing war in Vietnam. On February 8, 1966, Det. 5, 1352 Photographic Group at Tan Son Nhut Air Base, South Vietnam became the 600th Photo Squadron charged with the increased responsibility of all USAF photographic services in Southeast Asia except reconnaissance photography. This responsibility grew over the years to include combat documentation, automatic gun-camera and high-speed pod and blister photography of ordnance deliveries, still photography, and photographic support of the Vietnamese Air Force (VNAF).

Between 1966 and 1976, the 600th Photo Squadron lost 11 combat cameramen killed-in-action. Four were killed in 1968 at the height of U.S. combat operations in Vietnam.

=== Deactivation ===
In mid-1969, the 1352d Photographic Group, AAVS Headquarters, and the 1360th Photographic Squadron all relocated to Norton Air Force Base, which became the Air Force’s film depository holding over 100 million feet of 16mm and 35mm film.[29].

=== Private use ===
The facility was decommissioned and sold. The property was purchased at auction for $50,000. Dehl Berti, an American Indian actor, was the first private owner of the property. He struggled to keep the property afloat in the late 1970s and 1980s. With the purchase he had a full sound stage and production facility but did not include the canon-gun pillbox structure, meant for defense of the facility, at the end of the mountain. The sound stage still had the maps of the planned flight patterns painted on the floor. A former base employee reported that these maps were used by the film crew to identify A-bomb targets as they would look to pilots from the air. He also implied that the same sound stage was used to photoshoot a Moon landing back-up, in the case of transmission failure of the original landing. These claims are disputed though by historians such as Ned O'Gorman, as while Berti may have found what they thought was a Moon scene, however since by the mid-1960's Lookout Mountain's function had shifted towards filming Vietnam informational films for the military, the scenes and sets would be deserts which could be misconstrued as the Moon.

Berti began the addition of a swimming pool which could be viewed through thick glass windows in the former underground film development lab, as well as installing bathrooms in some of the rooms. Berti went broke and the property was repossessed by Berti's Orange County lender in the early 80's. Phil Seiflein, a local real estate developer, optioned the property in the mid-80's but lost control of it while traveling when his partners failed to exercise his $500,000 option and then failed to bid on it. A computer developer purchased it at auction in the mid-80s for $550,000 and completed redevelopment of the property into a liveable facility.

It was resold again in 1994 for $750,000 to artist Mark Lipscomb and attorney and former judge John Ladner.

It has been a private residence for many years. In 2011, the property was put up for sale for over $6 million (USD). When it was placed up for sale in 2011, the facility was a 50,000-square-foot (4,600 m^{2}), eight-bedroom residence on a 1.5 acres (0.61 ha) property.

As of November 2012, the former Air Force film studio and laboratory had been leased by the One80Center as a rehab center which, according to broker/blogger Jimmy Bayan, will be used to "house up to 18 residents at a time, who will dish out up to $50,000 per month to live and recover in this historic treasure."

In January 2015 actor Jared Leto purchased the property for $5 million.

== Productions ==
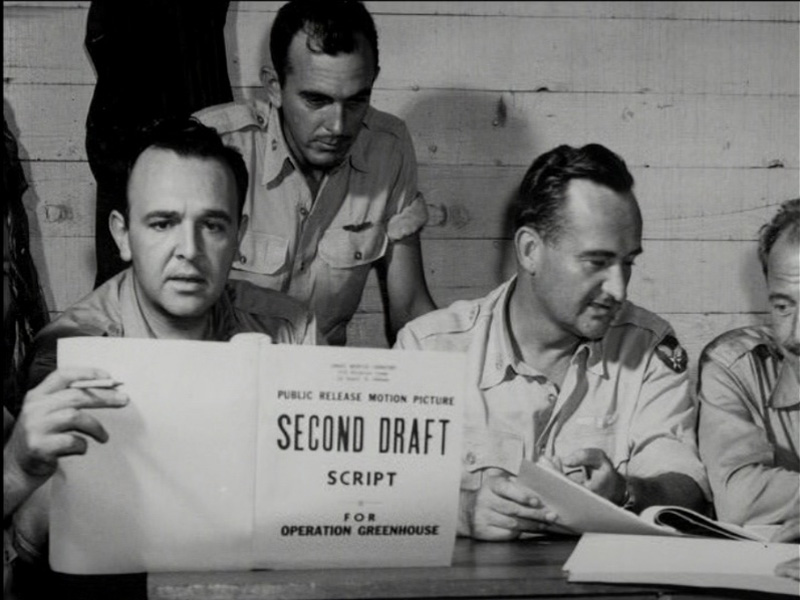
Production still from the film Operation Greenhouse

In an average year, Lookout Mountain produced 150 reels of finished film, a reel being 10 minutes of film, or roughly 35–40 finished films. In addition, Lookout Mountain provided film input for the monthly Air Force Newsreel, shown to Air Force personnel around the world, and briefing films for HQ USAF and unclassified film clips for the Secretary of the Air Force, Office of Information (SAFOI) to distribute to TV media from film received daily from the 600th Photo Squadron documenting Air Force combat operations in Vietnam.

Many of the Film Reports, Training Films and Special Film Projects featured well known Hollywood actors and voice-over narrators. Among those who have starred in Air Force films shot at "the Hill," as Lookout personnel called the studio, were: Reed Hadley, Bob Hope, Jimmy Stewart, Robert Preston, James Garner, Juliet Prowse, Gregory Peck, Keenan Wynn, Marvin Miller, Les Tremayne, Kim Novak, Glenn Ford and Lee Marvin. While a Brigadier General in the Air Force Reserve, Jimmy Stewart narrated several films and starred in a series of public service announcements for the Civil Air Patrol. Leonid Kinsky, who had played the bartender in "Casablanca" in 1942, starred in a series of training films with titles like "Kinsky's Report on Frostbite".

Among Special Film Projects were films like There Is A Way on YouTube which told the story of a squadron of Republic F-105 Thunderchief pilots who flew to North Vietnam to bomb strategic targets and often had to fight their way in and out against North Vietnamese MiGs. USAF Combat Photography In Southeast Asia which told the story of the 600th Photo Squadron whose combat photographers documented Air Force operations in South Vietnam and which included the rescue of down pilots from North Vietnam. A Night On Jackrabbit Mesa, explained to civilian authorities, police, fire and rescue, how to secure and handle the crash of an Air Force plane. Escape and Evasion, taught downed pilots how to evade the enemy and live off the land until rescued.

For years, at Christmas, the Air Force provided Bob Hope with air and logistical support for his annual Christmas tours to Vietnam to entertain the troops. As part of this support, Lookout Mountain Air Force Station provided 35mm film equipment and film crews to document Hope's tours. His tours were later broadcast on NBC as Bob Hope Specials.

Lookout Mountain Air Force Station also supported the AEC with documentation of underground nuclear tests at the Nevada Test Site (NTS) in Mercury, Nevada. Beginning in 1951 with Operation Ranger, the first series of atmospheric tests at NTS, photographers from the 1352 Photographic Squadron and the U.S. Army Signal Corps began experimenting with different photographic methods from high-speed to wide-screen. Nuclear tests were filmed in 35mm and 16mm color, in Cinemascope, VistaVision, and even 3-D. One of the last underground nuclear tests covered by Lookout Mountain crews was Midi Mist in June 1967. Between 1946 and 1969, Lookout Mountain studio produced more than 6,500 films for the Atomic Energy Commission and other government agencies. Many of these films remain classified.

Operation Ranger: Pictures shot using different techniques

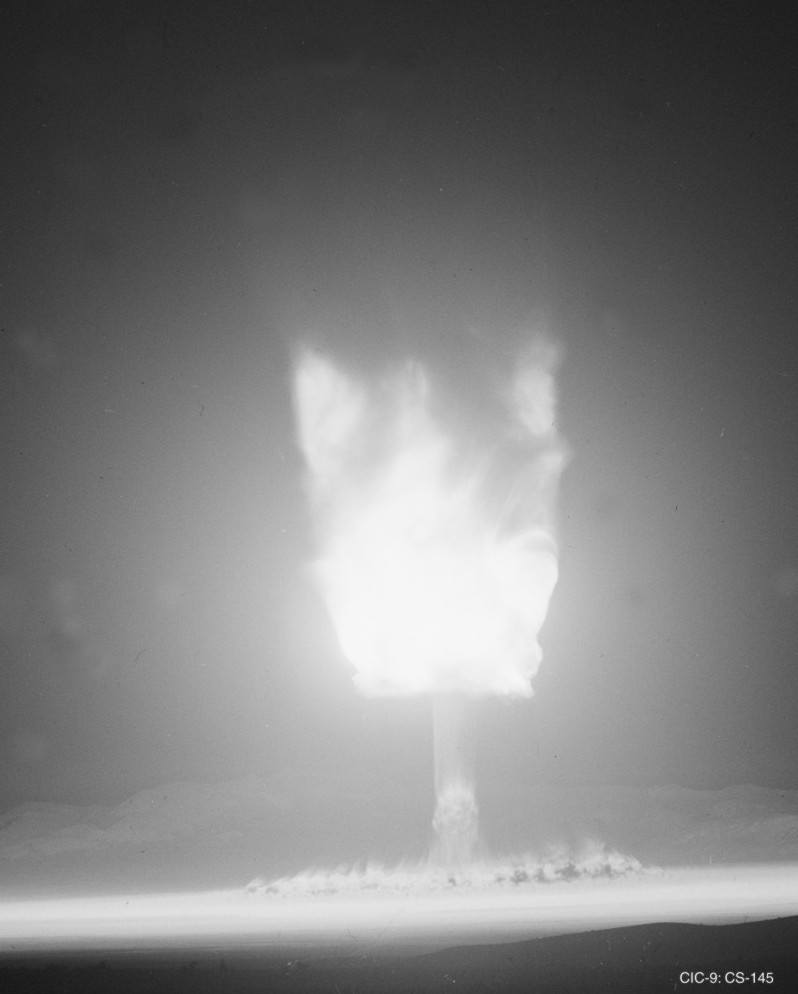
FOX Event - February 6, 1951

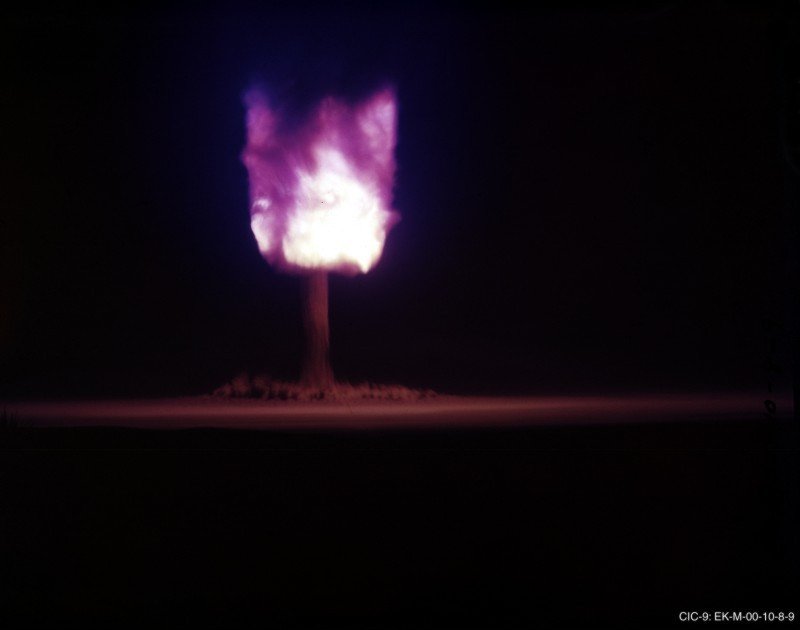

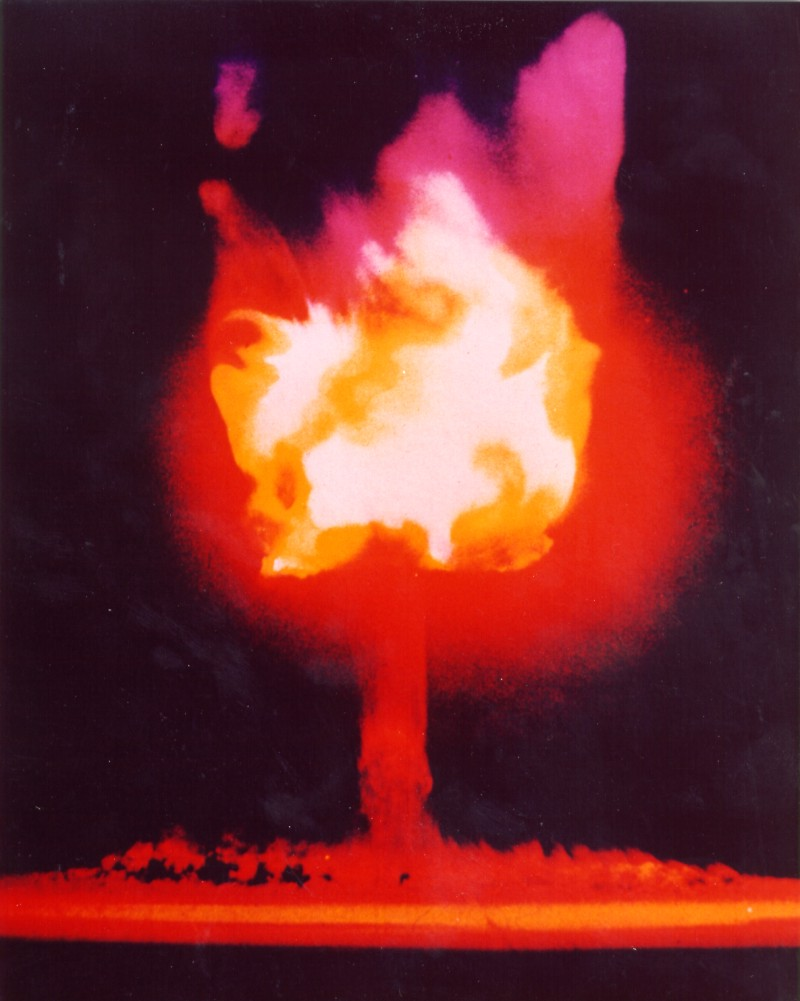

== Personnel ==
In the 1960s, Lookout Mountain, AFS was staffed by more than 250 military and civilian personnel. The studio employed many talented civilians as producers, writers, directors, cameramen, editors and animators. Many of these "old timers" had worked at Warner Bros., Metro-Goldwyn-Mayer, Universal and RKO Pictures." In addition, many of the producers and directors were veterans of Frank Capra's World War II film unit, or had been with combat photo teams of the Army, Navy and Marines.

W. Donn Hayes (1893–1973), who coined the name American Cinema Editors (ACE), was the past president of the Motion Picture Editors Guild and worked at Lookout Mountain as his last career assignment. Hayes had been in the film and television industries since 1916. Among his credits were Tarzan Escapes (1936), Hitchcock's Rebecca (1940), and Li'l Abner (1940).

Another Lookout Mountain editor, William "Bill" Holmes (1904–1978) had edited 54 feature films at Warner Bros. Holmes' credits included: Ben Hur (1925), I Was A Fugitive From A Chain Gang (1932), Dark Victory (1939), They Died With Their Boots On (1941) and Sergeant York, for which he won the 1941 Academy Award for Best Editing.

Barry Shipman (1912–1994), one of Lookout Mountain's writers, had written serials for Universal Pictures including Dick Tracy (1937) and Flash Gordon Conquers The Universe (1940), and had written for such TV series as Lassie, Ramar of the Jungle, Adventures of Wild Bill Hicock and Death Valley Days.
