= Nichols Canyon, Los Angeles =

Neighborhood in Los Angeles, California, United States

Nichols Canyon
- Neighborhood of Los Angeles

- Location within Western Los Angeles
- Country: United States
- State: California
- City: Los Angeles

Nichols Canyon is a residential area in the Hollywood Hills in Los Angeles, California, bounded by Hollywood Boulevard on the south and Mulholland Drive on the north, lying between Laurel Canyon and Runyon Canyon. It was also known as Miller Canyon.

== History ==
=== Ownership ===
Nichols Canyon was named after John Gregg Nichols Jr., reputed to be "the first child born of American parents in Los Angeles" (in 1851). Nichols' ranch in the canyon was referred to as a "goat pasture."

Jacob Miller, a "pioneer avocado grower," and his wife, Dorothy, bought seventy acres of the property in 1879, and the area became known as Miller Canyon. Mrs. Miller said in 1926:

Of course we had many hardships, not the least of which was having to drive through dust in summer and mud in winter to the hamlet of Los Angeles for our mail and supplies. There was nothing where Hollywood is now except a small ranch house. But we loved the hills and our beautiful canyon and were happy in our home and family."

=== Roadway ===
Nichols Canyon Road, leading north from Hollywood Boulevard, was completed to Woodrow Wilson Drive via Courtney Street in 1925. In 1926 the Automobile Club of Southern California reported that Nichols Canyon was traversed by a "good dirt road."

In 1929, plans were made to widen the Nichols Canyon thoroughfare to serve "as a major gateway for traffic flowing between North Hollywood, Burbank, San Fernando Valley cities, Pasadena and West Hollywood." The idea was to widen the roadway, referred to as a northward "extension" of Genesee Street, to 46 feet, "with six inches of asphaltic concrete, through Hollywood Boulevard Estates to Mullholland High Way." Work would include "sewers, water, gas, lights, storm drains and electroliers." Grading of the Nichols Canyon road had already been "completed and paid for by individual property owners, who have installed water connections the full length of the thoroughfare."

A 1930 report also stated that the canyon road would be renamed Genesee and would be extended north "to the Hollywood Boulevard Estates property line on Mulholland High Way." It was to be "developed as the main west lane of traffic through the hills" and would be "comparable with Cahuenga Pass, the main east channel."

=== Afforestation ===
==== The beginning ====
In 1914, the canyon had a "sparkling stream which the trail crosses about twenty times" and which "splashes over rocks fifty feet high," forming a pool below.

It was Dorothy Miller who was responsible for the exotic trees and shrubbery that eventually came to blanket Nichols Canyon. She planted and nurtured tropical seeds which an uncle gave her. They would not grow in the climate of his nursery in Downtown Los Angeles "but grew wonderfully in the frostless foothill belt." The Millers used Chinese laborers.

The Los Angeles Times said, "It was due to the love of a woman for plants, in a day when it was not fashionable for ladies to garden, that most of the subtropical plantings in Nichols Canyon, or Miller Canyon, as it is sometimes called, were begun."

==== The result ====
In 1997, James Sowell, the manager of environmental compliance for the Los Angeles Metropolitan Transit Authority noted the natural beauty of the three-mile-long canyon: "It's spectacular," he said. "The water comes down from two different directions. If you've driven up Nichols Canyon, part of it looks like a rain forest."

Flora in the area by the end of the 20th century included Western sycamore, acacia, laurel sumac and California holly. "Lush canyon bottoms," said the Los Angeles Times, "made a carpet of verdure which became "oases for wildlife."

=== Fires ===
Brush fires have struck the canyon over the years. One fire in 1904 was reported to have "utterly devastated" not only Nichols Canyon but also "Laurel Canyon adjacent to it," "many square miles" being "denuded of timber and all vegetation." A fire was extinguished on an extension road in Astral Drive between Curson and Nichols Canyon in September 1956. Three years later, residents had to flee another blaze that whipped through Laurel and Nichols canyons and destroyed homes.

Fire believed started in a homeless encampment, or by a homeless man cooking dinner in the brush above Hollywood Boulevard, threatened between forty and sixty homes in August 2005, but was quelled by firefighters.

=== Flood control ===
In 1913 the canyon was centered by a natural channel, or a wash, which crossed Sunset Boulevard at the south. A storm on February 25 of that year washed out the crossing.

Homes in Nichols Canyon suffered major damage or were swept away when a rainstorm drenched Southern California on New Year's Day, 1931. In 1934, the City Council allocated US$46,000 (equivalent to $1.11 million in 2025) for a large debris basin at the foot of the canyon, which residents had sought for years.

In 1981 Nichols Canyon, as well as Laurel Canyon, Mandeville Canyon and Bandini Canyon, was threatened by the possibility of heavy rain damage when it was revealed that the city lacked funds to continue with flood control projects. The Los Angeles Times reported:

Ironically, funds were once available to correct the major flood-control problem in Nichols Canyon. But the repeated opposition of canyon residents to construction of a storm-drain system serving the length of Nichols Canyon Road caused the city to divert funds elsewhere.

=== Satanite ===
In 1908, the Los Angeles County Board of Supervisors approved the establishment of a factory in the canyon to manufacture an explosive called Satanite, even after "Hollywood citizens and representatives of civic bodies" had protested. The approval followed demonstrations of the safety of the new product by company officials while a crowd of a hundred watched.

=== Quarries ===
Complaints were raised in 1912 about dust from the quarries in Nichols Canyon. The City Council ordered the road closed, but "this was not satisfactory." The quarry owners agreed to "furnish free of cost and spread upon the street the necessary gravel and crushed rock, and the city will oil the street."

=== Subway water diversion ===
In 1997, Nichols Canyon residents reached a settlement with the Los Angeles Metropolitan Transit Authority because, the residents said, the construction of a subway through Hollywood was drying up the foliage in the canyon and surrounding areas. Pumping of water flooding the tunnel beneath the Santa Monica Mountains was draining the entire Hollywood basin of up to a third of its annual capacity. Resident John Chickering said: "It was unbelievable. I looked out of my window one morning, and the falls were no more. The water had stopped. It was like a curse."

=== Police activity ===
In 1924, policemen from the Hollywood Station "rigged up a range in Nichols Canyon . . . where they can shoot against a wall of earth with perfect safety to others."

A score of police officers "beat the brush of isolated Nichols Canyon Road" on August 17, 1951, in an unsuccessful effort to find two .38-caliber revolvers that were used in the gangland killing of the "Two Tonys" – gangsters Tony Trambino and Tony Brancato – on August 6. They searched "Beside the winding roadway [where] runs a densely overgrown culvert which at places deepens to a 30-foot ditch and elsewhere widens into the enormous unused Nichols Canyon Reservoir."

=== Boy Scout camp ===
A Boy Scout camp was operating in the canyon as early as 1918, the year that Arthur Letts bought property for a permanent camp at a cost of US$6,000 (equivalent to $128,000 in 2025).

== Notable people ==
- Charles Coburn — actor
- Susan Cummings — actor
- Kaz Kuzui — film producer
- Stephen Merchant — actor
- Mircea Monroe — actor and model
- Luciana Paluzzi — actor
- Jason Beghe — actor
- Sophie Thatcher — actress
