= Bill Warrington =

Special effects artist (1910-1981)

- Born: William Warrington; 1910
- Died: 1981 (aged 70–71)
- Occupation: Visual effects artist
- Years active: 1932-1981

Bill Warrington (1910 – September 11, 1981) was a special effects artist. He won one Academy Award, which was for the film The Guns of Navarone. He shared his win with Chris Greenham, this was in the category of Best Special Effects during the 34th Academy Awards.

He did special effects on 70 films, with his final film being Raiders of the Lost Ark.
