= The Man in Gray =

1961 film

- Produced by: Benedetto Benedetti
- Release date: 1961
- Country: Italy
- Language: Italian

The Man in Gray (Italian: L'uomo in grigio) is a 1961 Italian short documentary film produced by Benedetto Benedetti. It was nominated for an Academy Award for Best Documentary Short.
