= Laurel Canyon, Los Angeles =

Neighborhood in Los Angeles, California

- Neighborhood of Los Angeles
- Location within Los Angeles and San Fernando Valley Laurel Canyon, Los Angeles (the Los Angeles metropolitan area)
- Coordinates: 34°07′02″N 118°22′31″W
- Country: United States
- State: California
- County: Los Angeles
- City: Los Angeles
- Named for: California bay laurel
- Elevation: 866 ft (264 m)
- Time zone: UTC-8 (PST)
  - Summer (DST): UTC-7 (PDT)

Laurel Canyon is a mountainous neighborhood in the Hollywood Hills region of the Santa Monica Mountains, within the Hollywood Hills West district of Los Angeles, California. The main thoroughfare of Laurel Canyon Boulevard connects the neighborhood with more urbanized parts of Los Angeles to the north and south, between Ventura Boulevard and Hollywood Boulevard.

Originally inhabited by the Tongva people, by the early 20th century real estate developers situated a vacation site along the slope of neighboring Lookout Mountain; this formed the nucleus of what would become the Laurel Canyon neighborhood. It later developed into a celebrity enclave: the remote, rugged nature of the land and its proximity to many of the movie studios in nearby Hollywood made it an ideal location for many movie stars to site their homes, especially during the Golden Age of Hollywood. Raymond Chandler's first novel The Big Sleep sets lurid scenes there, and in The Long Goodbye (1953), his private detective Philip Marlowe is residing in 'the Laurel Canyon district'.

By the 1960s, the neighborhood had become a local center for counterculture, and many prominent folk and rock musicians moved into the area, making it a nexus for musical collaboration. By the late 1970s, criminal activity in the neighborhood, including distribution of drugs, was controlled by the Wonderland Gang (named for a Laurel Canyon thoroughfare), and the neighborhood became associated with the Wonderland murders, a grisly quadruple homicide in 1981.

== Geography ==
Laurel Canyon is focused on its central thoroughfare, Laurel Canyon Boulevard. Unlike other nearby canyon neighborhoods, Laurel Canyon has houses lining one side of the main street most of the way up to Mulholland Drive. There are many side roads that branch off the main canyon, but most are not through streets, reinforcing the self-contained nature of the neighborhood. Some of the main side streets are Mount Olympus, Kirkwood, Wonderland Avenue, Willow Glen, and Lookout Mountain Avenue. The zip code for a portion of the neighborhood is 90046.

Laurel Canyon Boulevard is an important North–South route between: West Hollywood, Hollywood, and Central Los Angeles; and Studio City and the eastern San Fernando Valley. The canyon's division between the two regions is defined by Mulholland Drive.

The Laurel Canyon neighborhood is generally bounded by West Hollywood to the west and south, Hollywood to the east, and Studio City to the north.

== Fauna ==
Laurel Canyon is known for its natural wildlife and is home to at least one adult male mountain lion.

== History ==
=== Tongva indigenous peoples ===
The Laurel Canyon area was inhabited by the Tongva people, a regional tribe of the indigenous peoples of California, for thousands of years. A spring-fed stream flowed year-round providing water.

The reliable water supply attracted colonial Spanish ranchers who started grazing sheep on the hillsides in the late 18th and early 19th centuries. After the Mexican–American War and the advent of U.S. statehood for California in 1850, the area was settled by Americans interested in water rights.

=== Lookout Mountain ===
Until the 20th century, passage up the canyon was made on foot or by mule. In 1907, an 82-mile dirt road (132 km), later named Laurel Canyon Boulevard, was built. It ran up the canyon, dividing at what is now Lookout Mountain Road; the left road went up to the summit of Lookout Mountain, and the right branch of the road went to the top of the Santa Monica Mountains and then down to the San Fernando Valley.

In 1908, the Lookout Mountain Park and Water Co. was formed to purchase 280 acres (110 ha) on Lookout Mountain, just west of Laurel Canyon, subdivided and marketed as mountain vacation properties. On August 14, 1908, the Los Angeles Times announced that the company would build Lookout Mountain Inn at the summit of Lookout Mountain and Sunset Plaza roads, and Lookout Mountain Park, Bungalow Land at Laurel Canyon Boulevard and Lookout Mountain Avenue and Wonderland Park. Two years later, the company widened the winding dirt road to the top of Lookout Mountain where they built the Lookout Mountain Inn.

In 1910, Charles Spencer Mann, a real estate developer, and Richard Shoemaker, an electrical engineer, built a "trackless trolley" (trolley bus) line, starting passenger service on September 11 as the first commercial trolley bus operation (Electric road) in the United States. It ran up Laurel Canyon Road from the Pacific Electric Laurel Canyon Shuttle stop at Sunset Boulevard to the Tavern at the top of Lookout Mountain Road, a road house serving visitors.

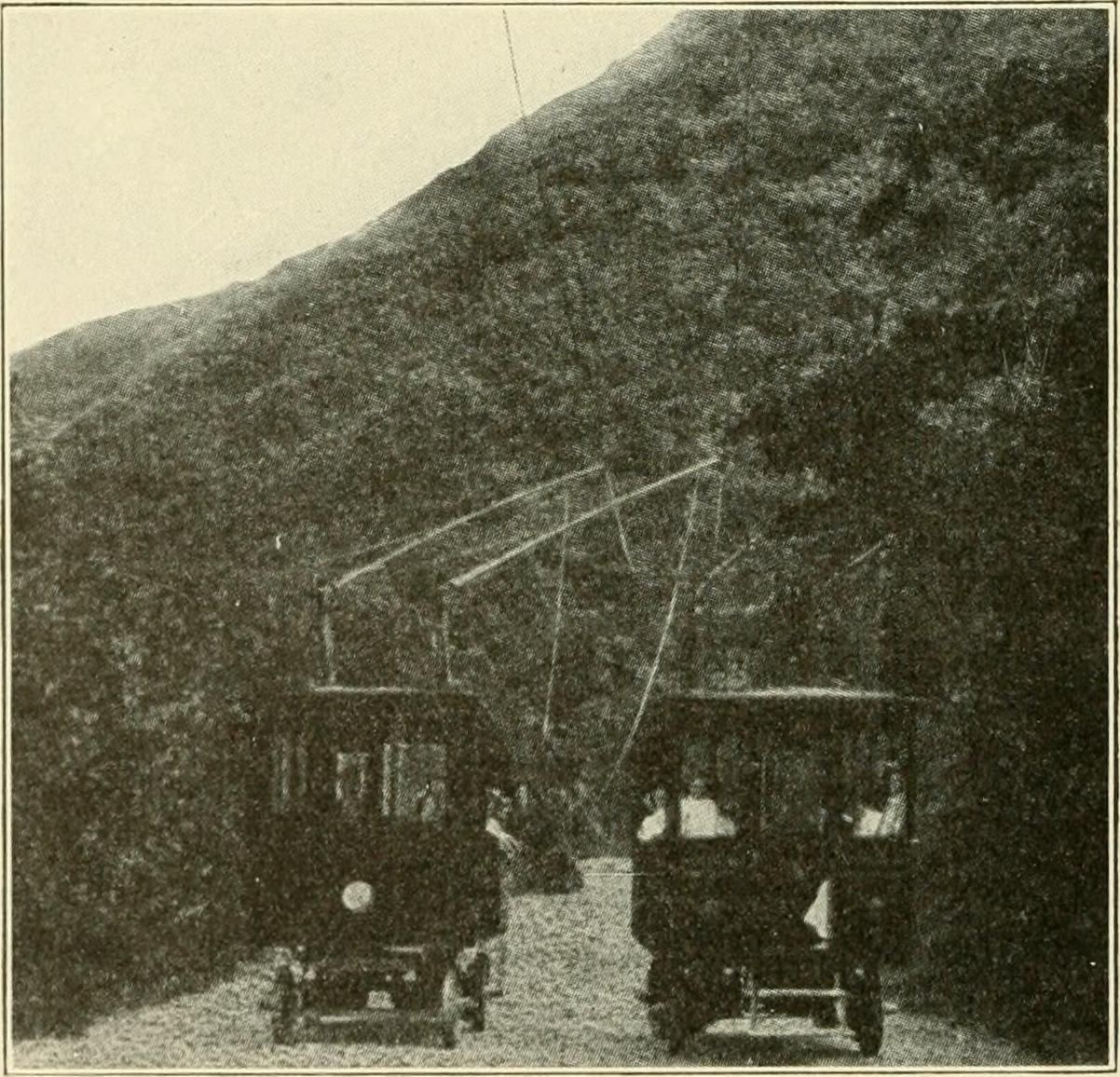
Trolley buses passing each other on Laurel Canyon Drive. The bus on the right is coasting downhill with its trolley poles down.

Each of the two 16-passenger cars had two trolley poles, one to a positive overhead wire and one to a ground overhead wire, and were able to sway to either side of the street, only using power uphill. Each trolley was actually an Oldsmobile bus whose gasoline engine was replaced with a 15-horsepower electric motor. Their original bodies were rebuilt in 1912, their open sides being enclosed. Sometime in 1915, they were replaced by Stanley steam buses and the overhead wires were taken down. Until 1918, the shuttle service traveled up and down Laurel Canyon to meet the half hour schedule to Los Angeles. It was insufficiently patronized and discontinued when demand failed to support it after Pacific Electric stopped service to Laurel Canyon Boulevard from Gardner Junction (at Gardner Street and Sunset Boulevard, 1451 N Gardner St, West Hollywood, CA 90046) in 1924.

On October 26, 1918, a fire, fanned by strong Santa Ana winds, burned about 200 acres and totally destroyed Lookout Mountain Inn at the summit of Lookout Mountain Avenue and Sunset Plaza Drive. Another major fire occurred in July 1959, destroying some 38 homes.

As the roads were improved, access was possible by automobile.

=== Early Hollywood celebrity enclave ===
With the establishment of the Hollywood film industry in 1910, Laurel Canyon became home to numerous silent film stars, including Clara Bow, Harry Houdini, (Note: Houdini may have rented the Walker estate at 2400 Laurel Canyon Boulevard around 1919.) Bessie Love, Ramón Novarro, and Wallace Reid.

In 1915, Ralf Marc Walker, built a Mediterranean-style villa at 2398 Laurel Canyon Blvd (the address later became 2400 Laurel Canyon Blvd).

=== Bungalow Inn ===
At Bungalow Land, a housing subdivision, Bungalow Inn at 2401 Laurel Canyon Boulevard, was built in 1907, as a roadhouse tavern with an 80-foot (24 m) living room, floor-to-ceiling fireplace, and bowling alley. Actress Bessie Love purchased the property in 1920, and it was later rented by actress Clara Bow. In 1958, Fania Pearson, bought it to build a girls school. Decades later, musician Frank Zappa rented in 1968, marking the neighborhood's transition from Hollywood enclave to counterculture music scene. The mansion burned down on Halloween 1981, and, as of 2025, the lot remains vacant. Citizens for Los Angeles Wildlife and the Mountains Recreation and Conservation Authority purchased the approximately 2.5-acre parcel, home to Laurel Spring.

=== Counterculture of the 1960s and 1970s ===
Laurel Canyon became a nexus of counterculture activity and attitudes in the mid-late 1960s and early 1970s, becoming famous as home to many of L.A.'s rock musicians, such as Cass Elliot of the Mamas & the Papas; Joni Mitchell; Frank Zappa; Jim Morrison of the Doors; Carole King; the Byrds; Gram Parsons; Buffalo Springfield; Canned Heat; John Mayall; members of the band The Eagles; the band Love; Neil Young; Brian Wilson of the Beach Boys as well as James Taylor, Jackson Browne, JD Souther, Judee Sill, Linda Ronstadt and Stone Poneys, Ned Doheny, Bonnie Raitt, Harry Nilsson;, David Cassidy and Micky Dolenz and Peter Tork of the Monkees. Cass Elliot's home was considered one of Laurel Canyon's party houses with all-night, drug-fueled sleepovers, attended by musicians and movie stars of the era.

John Phillips, also of the Mamas & the Papas, took inspiration from his home in Laurel Canyon for the song "Twelve Thirty (Young Girls Are Coming to the Canyon)", released in 1967. The following year, blues artist John Mayall recorded and released the album Blues from Laurel Canyon, based on his experiences during a vacation that he spent there.

The area and its denizens served as inspiration for Joni Mitchell's third album Ladies of the Canyon, released in 1970. Her house was immortalized in the Crosby, Stills, and Nash song "Our House" (1970), written by her lover Graham Nash. The group is reputed to have met and first sung together in Mitchell's living room.

Rock photographer Henry Diltz was also a resident and used the scenic Canyon backdrop for many of his historic photos of rock musicians. Several of his photos became representations of the West Coast music scene during the 1960s and 1970s; other of his photos became album sleeve covers, such the one used for as CSN's debut album Crosby, Stills & Nash (photographed in nearby West Hollywood).

=== Josh Tillman ===
Musician Josh Tillman has said that his output under the moniker Father John Misty was partly inspired by a move to Laurel Canyon. The song "I Went to the Store One Day" from his 2015 album I Love You, Honeybear, recounts the story of how Tillman met his wife, Emma, in the parking lot of the Laurel Canyon Country Store.

=== Wonderland murders ===
On July 1, 1981, three members and one associate of the Wonderland Gang, so-called because they were based at 8763 Wonderland Avenue, died in the Wonderland murders (also known as the "Four on the Floor murders" or the "Laurel Canyon murders"). The massacre took place close to a home owned by Jerry Brown, who was California's governor at the time. The 8763 Wonderland Avenue address was used at one time by Paul Revere & the Raiders."

== Notable people ==
- Michael Ironside, lived in Laurel Canyon until 2019

== See also ==
- Counterculture of the 1960s
- Echo in the Canyon
- Laurel Canyon, documentary
- Laurel Canyon, movie
- Lookout Mountain Air Force Station
- The Mansion (recording studio)
- Laurel Spring
