= Samuel Bronston Productions =

Independent American film production company

- Industry: Entertainment
- Founded: 1943
- Founder: Samuel Bronston
- Defunct: 1964 (bankruptcy)
- Successors: Library: Warner Bros. Pictures (through distribution of King of Kings); Paramount Pictures (through distribution of The Fall of the Roman Empire and Circus World)
- Headquarters: Chamartín de la Rosa, Madrid, Spain; 505 Park Avenue, New York City, United States
- Key people: Samuel Bronston; Jaime Prades; Michał Waszyński
- Products: Motion pictures

Samuel Bronston Productions was an independent American film production company, established by Samuel Bronston in 1943. The studio became known for producing several historical epics, including King of Kings (1961), El Cid (1961), 55 Days at Peking (1963), and The Fall of the Roman Empire (1964).

In 1940, Bronston partnered with James Roosevelt, the son of U.S. President Franklin D. Roosevelt, but their collaboration produced no films. Bronston next joined Columbia Pictures and worked as an associate producer on The Adventures of Martin Eden (1942). In 1943, Bronston founded his namesake studio, and produced Jack London (1943) for United Artists. He next collaborated with Lewis Milestone on the war film A Walk in the Sun (1945) and René Clair on the mystery film And Then There Were None (1945); however, Bronston went uncredited as he struggled to raise financing.

Bronston left Hollywood and produced a documentary with the Vatican. In 1955, he returned to Hollywood to produce John Paul Jones (1959). He relocated Bronston Productions in Madrid, and raised financial capital by pre-selling his film projects to private investors, including financier Pierre S. du Pont III. In Madrid, Bronston spearheaded several productions of historical epics, including King of Kings (1961), El Cid (1961), 55 Days at Peking (1963), and The Fall of the Roman Empire (1964).

In June 1964, Bronston declared bankruptcy due to the box office failures of The Fall of the Roman Empire and Circus World (1964). From there, Bronston entered a years-long financial litigation with du Pont III, in which he was ordered to pay $3 million.

== History ==
=== 1943–1945: Origins ===
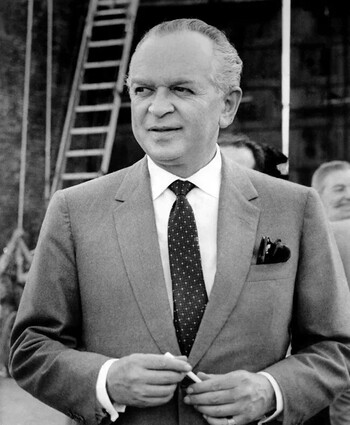
Samuel Bronston (pictured here)

On February 16, 1943, Samuel Bronston announced the formation of his namesake production company, having secured the financial support of three banking institutions. Those included were Lazard, Guaranty Trust Co. of New York, and the Security-First National Bank of Los Angeles (SFNB). Bronston appointed Joe Nadel as production manager and Bernard Herzbrun as art director. The studio was headquartered at the Samuel Goldwyn Studio. Furthermore, he announced a five-year plan to release 15 feature films, each to be distributed by United Artists (UA). The first inaugural production was the 1943 film Jack London.

By April 1943, Bronston had signed Alfred Santell and Ernest Pascal to direct and write the screenplay, respectively, for Jack London. The film was intended to start production on May 28, 1943, but was postponed until July 1943 when Bronston selected Michael O'Shea for the title role, on loan from Hunt Stromberg. The New York Times reported Bronston's next project was a biographical film of General Billy Mitchell by Isaac Don Levine, for which he acquired the screen rights for $100,000. Bronston had planned to film The Life of Billy Mitchell in 1945, but the project did not reach fruition.

Lewis Milestone had a chance encounter with Bronston, who encouraged him to work independently for his production company. Milestone explained, "I was taking a walk one night when I met Sam Bronston and he asked me to do a film for him which United Artists would release. That suited me fine. I didn't want to go back to a major studio which would have meant having to wrestle continuously with a whole army of executives." By August 1944, Milestone signed a contract with Bronston Productions to direct independent film projects. After considering a number of best-selling novels, Milestone announced he would direct Borrowed Night, a film adaptation of the Oscar Ray novel. The story concerned two boys and one girl who are forced into the Wehrmacht and escape through goldbricking. Meanwhile, Bronston also had contracted two French directors René Clair and Julien Duvivier, with the intention they would adapt Jack London's other novels, which included The Valley of the Moon, The Star Rover, and The Little Lady of the Big House.

However, by the fall of 1944, Clair instead decided to direct a film adaptation of Agatha Christie's 1943 play And Then There Were None (which was also performed under the title Ten Little Indians). Dudley Nichols was hired to write the screenplay, while the principal cast included Louis Hayward, Barry Fitzgerald, and ZaSu Pitts. Principal photography was scheduled to begin on November 15, 1944. Meanwhile, Duvivier had been set to direct Edward Chodorov's 1944 play Decision. The project centered on a returning U.S. war veteran who discovers fascism rampant at home, but United Artists dropped the production when it was met with opposition from the United States Office of War Information (OWI). Between 1942 to 1945, the OWI reviewed Hollywood film scripts, and urged revisions or discarded material which portrayed the United States in a negative light, including anti-war sentiment.

In 1944, the Zeppo Marx Agency sent Milestone a copy of Harry Brown's war novel A Walk in the Sun. Milestone read the novel and prompted Bronston to buy the screen rights. Bronston purchased the rights from the Alfred A. Knopf publishing company. In November 1944, filming for A Walk in the Sun began at the Agoura Ranch in San Fernando Valley, as a stand-in for Italy. Financing for the film was primarily handled by the bank creditor Walter E. Heller & Co. of Chicago which loaned $850,000, while Ideal Factoring Corp. contributed secondary financing for $300,000. However, the loan from Ideal Factoring (headed by Martin Hersh) was secured at the start of the production. Back in New York, Bronston phoned Milestone to report Walter E. Heller had withdrawn their loan agreement. Bronston tried to arrange a more lucrative arrangement, in which they offered $200,000 at 6 percent interest, plus a bonus of 15 percent and 40 percent of the picture's profits (for a sum total of $300,000). Alarmed at the figure, the Chicago banks withdrew their offer. Bankrupt, Bronston withdrew from the project altogether.

Milestone and other private creditors arranged a package deal with Charles K. Feldman to defer their salaries in exchange for a percentage of the box office gross. Milestone next flew out to Chicago to meet with David O'Hara, head of the Chicago financiers, and negotiated $750,000 to finish the production. Filming on A Walk in the Sun wrapped on January 5, 1945. United Artists however decided not to distribute the film as they had agreed to release The Story of G.I. Joe (1945), another war film. Milestone then screened for Darryl F. Zanuck, in which Twentieth Century-Fox agreed to distribute the film.

In January 1945, Bronston filed a $4 million lawsuit against Ideal Factoring Corp., Walter E. Heller and Co., David Hersh, and five others, charging them with seeking to defraud him of the profits and his financial interest in the film A Walk in the Sun. Bronston alleged in the suit the defendants had unlawfully sold his rights to the film to Ideal Factoring. Within a year, A Walk in the Sun had earned $1.6 million in domestic box office rentals. Twentieth Century-Fox took 30 percent of the earnings for their distribution fee. Since the budget had exceeded its original amount, Variety estimated that the bank creditors lost $200,000.

That same month, Bronston had lost the rights to Ten Little Indians due to copyright issues. A new production company Popular Pictures, Inc., headed by Harry Popkin and Edward J. Peskay, was formed to finish the project, retitled as And Then There Were None (1945). René Clair and Dudley Nichols remained with the project, along with the principal cast.

=== 1946–1959: Return from dormancy ===
In March 1946, Bronston announced plans to produce a biographical film of John Paul Jones. He stated he had wanted to commence filming during the same summer with the cooperation of the United States Navy. A month later, Bronston offered the project to Warner Bros. Pictures. However, the project was dropped due to the needed expenses and lengthy screen time necessary to cover the subject adequately.

In 1949, The New York Times reported that Bronston was developing a feature-length documentary in Rome based on The Vatican: Behind the Scenes in the Holy City, a book by Ann Carnahan. The documentary was intended to feature the daily life of Vatican citizens and views of holy places to be visited by pilgrims during the impending Holy Year. At the time, the documentary was the first color film production taken within the Vatican. Bronston was also involved in a lengthy project to document the Vatican's treasures in an extensive collection of 35 mm slides. According to Bronston's biographer Mel Martin, Bob Considine narrated the film.

A year later, in 1950, Variety reported Bronston had returned to the United States, having spent 15 months filming the Vatican. Bronston, who had been the production chief of All-Nations Television Corp., intended to release his documentary as a series of shorts for theatrical distribution. He also sought to publish pictures of the Vatican in Life magazine.

By 1955, Bronston returned to Hollywood and aimed to reactivate his long-dormant biopic of John Paul Jones. He formed Admiralty Pictures Corporation, an investment company with a group of New York investors. Bronston was the president, while R. Stuyvesant Pierrepont Jr. served as the chairman of the board of directors. Through this contact, Bronston recruited multiple limited partners, including Nelson and Laurence Rockefeller. The most influential partner of Bronston's partners was Pierre S. du Pont III, a member of the prominent family and senior executive in their business enterprises. The Du Ponts had financed patriotic radio and television series, and Bronston's project appealed to him. Du Pont personally invested nearly $1.5 million, over a quarter of the film's total cost. Several companies which invested included DuPont, General Motors, Eastman Kodak, and Firestone Tire and Rubber Company.

Bronston had initially planned to film John Paul Jones (1959) in the United States and overseas, including in both Scotland and Italy. In 1957, Bronston met with José María de Areilza, then Spain's Ambassador to the United States, at a U.S. State Department dinner. Areilza encouraged him to shoot on location in Spain. Moreover, Bronston's pool of investors had investments frozen in place by local currency restrictions in Italy, France, and Spain. One day, he received a private investment of $500,000, which was tied up in Spanish pesetas. When Bronston arrived in Madrid, he selected Spain to film John Paul Jones because of the support of the government, the cheap, cost-efficient labor, and accommodable filming conditions.

Bronston hired John Farrow to direct John Paul Jones as part of his three-picture deal, and the cast included Robert Stack in the title role, Macdonald Carey, Charles Coburn, Marisa Pavan and Jean Pierre Aumont. He also hired retired Admiral Chester Nimitz as his personal advisor on the film. Nimitz immediately connected Bronston with assistance from the United States Navy, including Nimitz's successor, who pledged the Navy's full cooperation. Alan Brown was recruited as associate producer, having served as Nimitz's executive officer at the Pacific Fleet headquarters. The production was shot mostly on location in Spain, with permission from the Royal Palace of Madrid by the Francoist Spanish government. Minor filming was done on location in England and France.

Released by Warner Bros. in 1959, John Paul Jones received mixed reviews from film critics. The film earned $1 million in distributor rentals from the United States and Canada. In 1964, Warner Bros. sold their ownership of the film to Bronston, who planned to re-release the film later that same year.

=== 1960–1964: Successful releases and bankruptcy ===
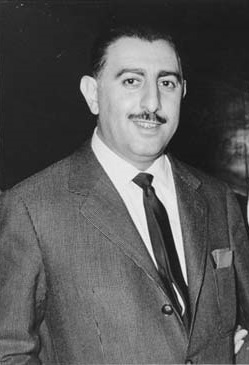
Jaime Prades (pictured here) served as the vice president of production for Samuel Bronston Productions and was the associate producer on several of their films.

Upon the completion of John Paul Jones, Bronston relocated his studio to Madrid. There, he started development on a more ambitious epic, King of Kings (1961). Within a few years, Bronston hired more production staff personnel and studio executives to handle management and distribution. Michał Waszyński was hired as an executive producer, after Bronston had met Waszyński through Robert Haggiag. Waszyński presented himself as a descendant of the displaced Polish aristocracy. Regarded for his elegance and impeccable manners, he was known as the "Prince." Waszyński had previously worked as an assistant to F. W. Murnau and directed over thirty Polish films, among them The Dybbuk (1937). Jaime Prades, a Uruguayan who worked for Cesáreo González's studio, served as an intermediary between Bronston's studio and the Spanish government.

In October 1958, Bronston and John Farrow formed a production company, Brofar. However, Farrow exited the project due to Bronston, who allegedly saw the script as anti-Semitic and not sufficiently dramatic. In November 1959, Nicholas Ray was then hired as director, and promptly hired screenwriter Philip Yordan to write a new script. In March 1960, Bronston met with Pope John XXIII, who had been pleased the script refocused its blame for the Crucifixion of Jesus on the Romans, gave King of Kings his blessing and pledged the Vatican's full cooperation.

Bronston, having consolidated his studio in Madrid, initially tried to acquire the Sevilla Film Studios, the largest Spanish film studio with five sound stages. The deal fell through, and Bronston instead rented the Sevilla and Chamartín Studios, the latter of which had new sound stages approved by municipal authorities. Filmed in Super Technirama 70, King of Kings went into production in April 1960. By June of the same year, Metro-Goldwyn-Mayer (MGM) obtained the film's distribution rights. King of Kings premiered at the Loew's State Theatre in New York City on October 11, 1961, and began roadshow engagements in 22 key cities throughout the United States. The film received mixed reviews from critics and was a box office success, earning $8 million in distributor rentals from the United States and Canada.

While King of Kings was still in pre-production, Bronston was preparing another historical epic El Cid (1961). A dream project of Bronston's since 1958, the film's subject matter was tailored to appease the Francoist regime, whose namesake leader envisioned himself as the Cid's latter-day incarnation. Set in the 11th century, the film centered on Rodrigo Díaz de Vivar, known as the Cid, who mobilizes the Kingdom of Spain against the Moors. As Spanish financiers and banks were not permitted to invest into Samuel Bronston Productions Inc., a foreign company, Bronston formed a local production company, Samuel Bronston Española, which allowed the Spaniards to invest into his films. Thereby, local villages were employed to make costumes, and foundries made steel helmets and swords.

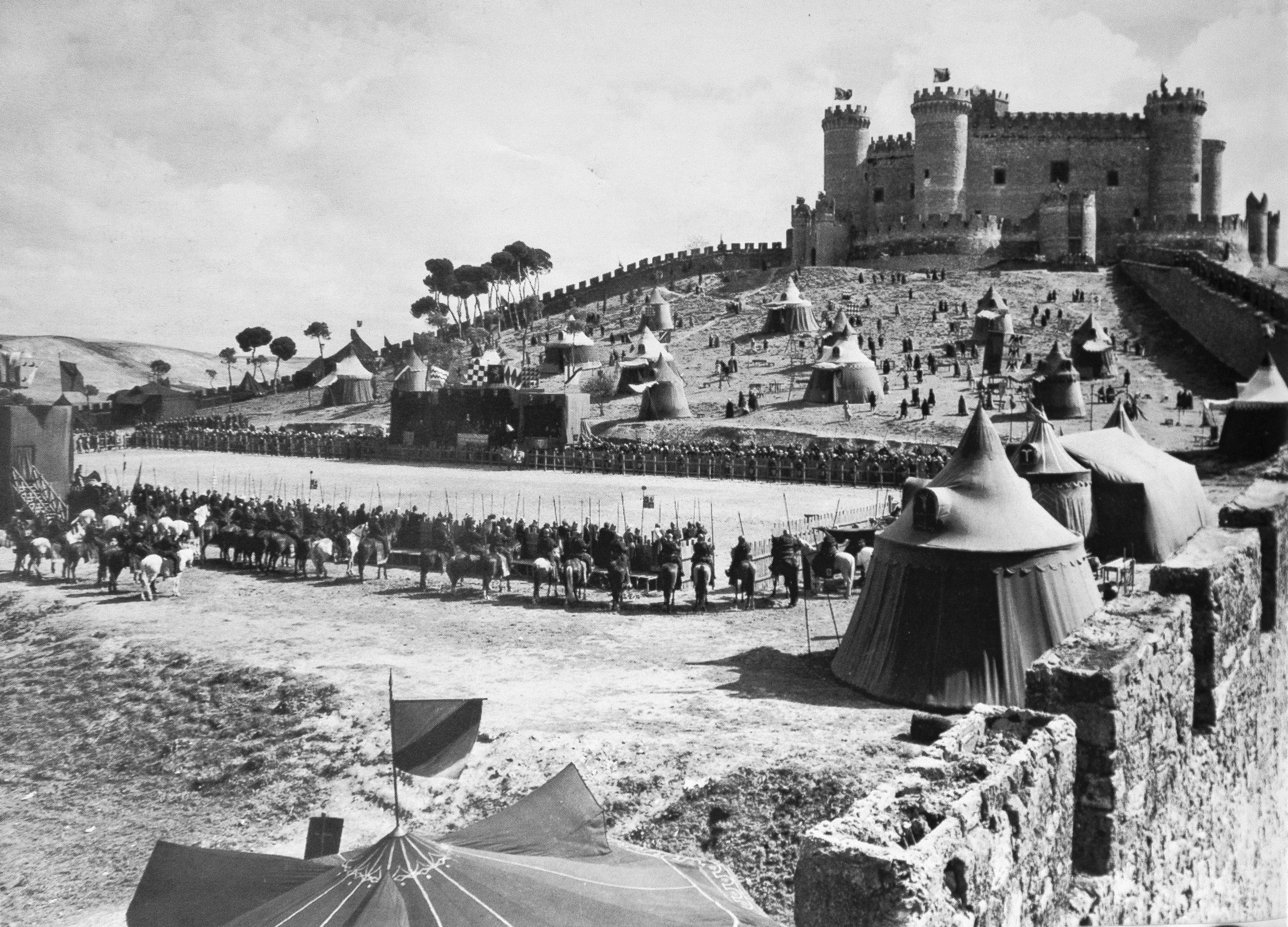
Filming for the jousting sequence in El Cid, near the Castle of Belmonte, Spain.

Before principal photography began on El Cid, Bronston was faced with an infringement lawsuit from Cesáreo González's Aspa Films, who had earlier announced his El Cid project in 1956. By August 1960, Bronston negotiated to have Aspa Films and Robert Haggiag's Dear Film involved in his production, thus making El Cid an Italian–Spanish co-production. Furthermore, Bronston signed Allied Artists to distribute the film in the United States. Filmed in Super Technirama 70, and directed by Anthony Mann, interior scenes for El Cid were shot at Chamartín, Sevilla, and Cea Studios. Additional filming was done in Rome for tax incentives. Released in December 1961, El Cid received critical acclaim, with praise towards Mann's direction, the cast, and the cinematography. At the box office, the film earned $12 million in distributor rentals from the United States and Canada.

In September 1961, Bronston announced he was planning a trilogy of historical epic films in Spain; among them were 55 Days at Peking (1963) and The Fall of the Roman Empire (1964). Nicholas Ray, who was set to direct an epic retelling of the French Revolution, decided instead to direct 55 Days at Peking. Bronston purchased the Chamartín Studios near the completion of King of Kings, and renamed it the Samuel Bronston Studios. Meanwhile, the sets for 55 Days of Peking were built in Las Matas, about 20 kilometres (12 mi) outside of Madrid, leading into the Sierra de Guadarrama. There, Bronston rented a vast terrain of 250 acres (100 ha) and periodically renewed an option to purchase it.

During filming on 55 Days of Peking, Jaime Prades was forced out, and Bronston promoted Michał Waszyński as vice president of production, while remaining as the film's associate producer. That same time, Bronston was heavily involved with The Fall of the Roman Empire, a more ambitious film project in which he sought to reconstruct the city of Rome in Las Matas. Bronston was already arranging the distribution pre-sales for the project and looked to reuse materials from the Peking set to construct the exterior Roman Forum sets. On September 11, 1962, Nicholas Ray was hospitalized for a heart attack, which suited Bronston and Waszyński who both wanted to move forward with The Fall of the Roman Empire. Ray was relieved of his duties, and Charlton Heston called in Guy Green to direct the remaining scenes between him and Ava Gardner. Bronston called in second unit director Andrew Marton to finish the remainder of filming.

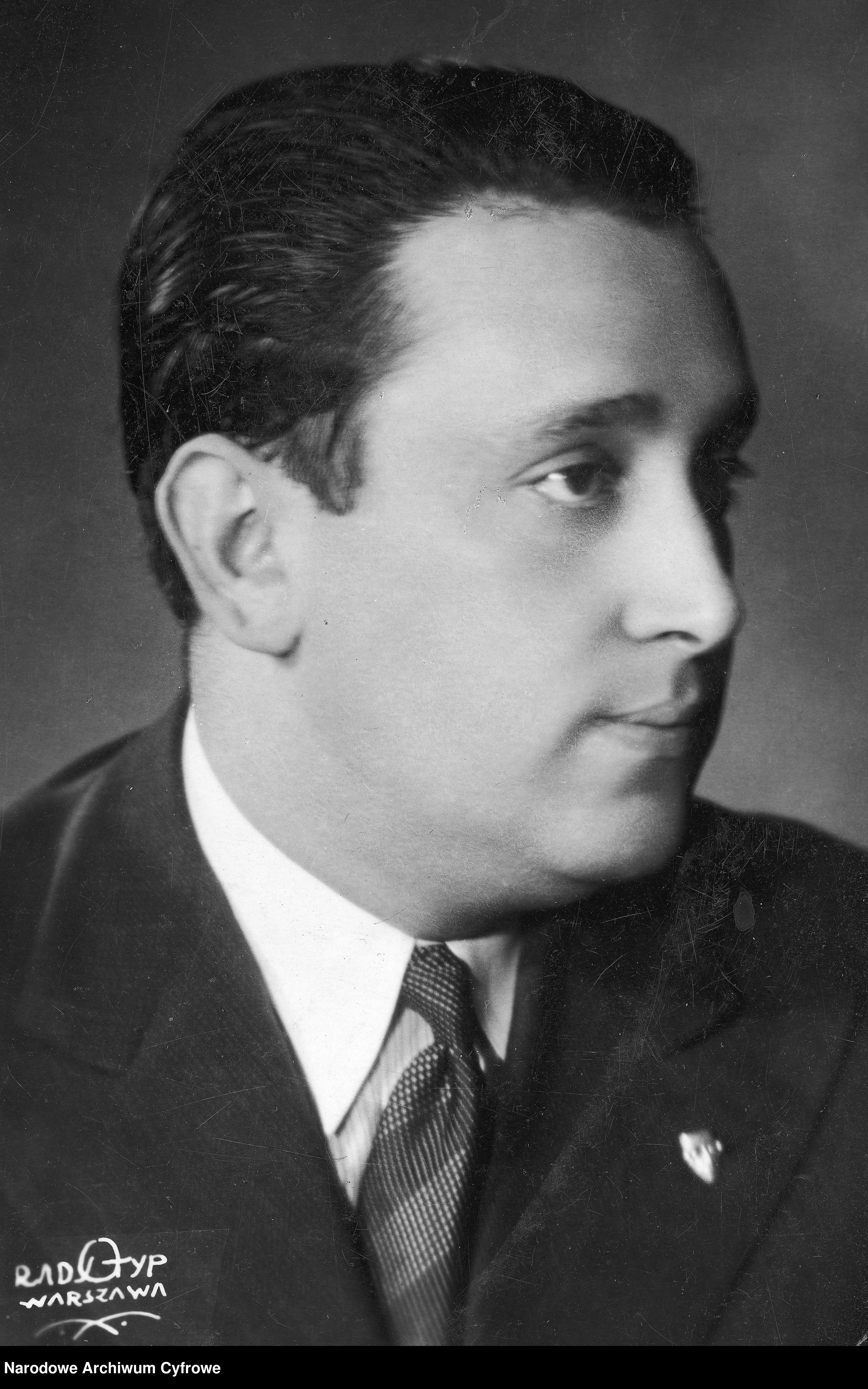
Michał Waszyński (pictured here in 1934) served as an executive producer for Samuel Bronston Productions until he died in 1965. His financial management played a role in the studio's bankruptcy.

Released in May 1963, 55 Days at Peking was distributed by Allied Artists in the United States and Canada. It received mixed reviews from film critics, who praised the production design, but were not impressed with the script. By January 1964, the film earned $5 million in distributor rentals from the United States and Canada. Due to the film's estimated $9 million production budget, the film did not earn a profit in the United States, but recouped its cost from international territories. In July 1964, Bronston later told The Hollywood Reporter the film had earned $7.2 million in total.

In April 1963, Bronston formed Bronston Distributions, Inc., with the intent to release The Fall of the Roman Empire, which was scheduled for spring 1964 for first-run roadshow engagements. Paul N. Lazarus, Jr., executive vice president of the production unit, was selected to head the distribution company, with Harold Roth as sales manager. Additionally, Lazarus and Milton Goldstein, a foreign sales executive, were assigned to cover the Cannes Film Festival and other film festivals to scout for potential films to release. That same year, Bronston Distributions, Inc. released a French-language comedy War of the Buttons (1962) to no financial success.

However, in December 1963, Paramount Pictures signed a distribution deal to release Bronston's next four films for an investment of $40 million. The Fall of the Roman Empire and Circus World were both scheduled for 1964, while a Nightrunners of Bengal film was in development with Richard Fleischer set to direct. Concerned that the first two films had both gone over budget (costing a total of $24 million), Pierre S. du Pont III asked Bronston to sign him as the principal trustee, granting him control over Bronston's films. This way, Bronston could not proceed with any contractual or financial measure without du Pont's full approval.

By March 1964, du Pont III had acquired control over Bronston Productions. It was also separately reported half of the 40-person staff at Bronston Productions' New York office had been laid off with no warning, a decision Bronston had made "at the request of our banks". Lazarus told Variety that he was not leaving "at the moment", but the layoffs were advised to cut unnecessary overhead. The next month, Lazarus had left and partnered with film producer Max Rosenberg to form an independent studio, Pennell Pictures. Goldstein also left, and was named as special assistant for special productions to Paramount International Films.

Released in March 1964, The Fall of the Roman Empire received mixed reviews and was a financial failure, in which it earned $1.9 million in distributor rentals in the United States and Canada. A month later, Paramount announced it would still release Circus World later that year, with its investment in the film left intact. Frank Capra was originally set to direct the film, but was replaced by Henry Hathaway. He and the film's star John Wayne helped secure Paramount Pictures' investment to complete and release the film. However, Circus World was another financial failure, in which it earned $1.6 million in distributor rentals in the United States and Canada.

In June 1964, Bronston filed for Chapter 11 bankruptcy, reporting over $5.6 million in owed debts to Pierre S. du Pont III. The case was filed in New York Supreme Court before Justice Thomas A. Aurelio. Du Pont's attorney Simon H. Rifkind presented three promissory notes signed by Bronston on December 14 and 28, 1962. Bronston's attorneys argued their client signed the notes "solely as an accommodation to satisfy certain tax problems of Mr. du Pont, and were made with the clear understanding that Mr. Bronston was not to be personally liable on them." In late December 1966, Aurelio awarded du Pont III a summary judgment award of nearly $3.6 million, affirming Bronston's statements were "without valid basis." In 1971, the ruling was upheld by the New York Supreme Court.

=== 1965–1971: Financial litigation and aftermath ===
At the time, Bronston had established his studio in Las Matas, which was still managed under Samuel Bronston Española. To alleviate his debts, Bronston leased his studios to Televisión Española (TVE). Another part of his studio was lent to Twentieth Century-Fox, which used the facilities to shoot four films in Spain, which included 100 Rifles (1969) and Patton (1970). Philip Yordan also formed a production company called Scotia International to film Battle of the Bulge (1965) and Krakatoa, East of Java (1968). Bronston received outside revenue through his investments in Spanish petroleum oil, and continued box office rentals from his films were paid to his creditors.

In April 1966, Bronston announced a biographical film titled Isabella of Spain was in development. He had secured financial backing from a pool of Spanish investors and the support of Manuel Fraga, the country's Minister of Information and Tourism. By 1971, he had managed to raise $1 million for pre-production, with most of the private capital raised in England. Glenda Jackson was cast as the titular queen and John Philip Law was cast as Ferdinand II. Ronald Neame was set to direct, with plans to commence filming later that summer in Madrid.

Meanwhile, the Banco Español de Crédito launched an inquiry into Bronston Productions when payments into Bronston's debts were not producing interest. The bank decided to foreclose even though the studio was occupied by the TVE. The bank appealed to Fraga's successor Alfredo Sánchez Bella, who held no particular sympathies towards Bronston. Sánchez Bella ordered for the TVE to vacate the facilities, though TVE's president Adolfo Suárez refused because production for the following year would be adversely affected. However, Sánchez Bella won out, and as TVE vacated, the bank foreclosed on the studio.

Isabella of Spain was subsequently cancelled, and the Banco Español de Crédito held a public auction selling assets of the studio on the sound stages. The auction lasted four days, with the proceeds transferred to the Union of Film Workers, which had filed suit on behalf of select union members owed thousands in back payments. In 1984, the former Samuel Bronston Studios was sold and then renamed the Luis Buñuel Studios. In 1984, it was used for the filming of Rustlers' Rhapsody (1985), which starred Tom Berenger.

== List of Samuel Bronston Productions films ==
Year	Title	Distributor	Producer	Director	Star(s)	Academy Awards		Notes
Year	Title	Distributor	Producer	Director	Star(s)	Wins	Nominations	Notes
1943	Jack London	United Artists	Samuel Bronston	Alfred Santell	Michael O'Shea & Susan Hayward		Best Original Score (Freddie Rich)	
1959	John Paul Jones	Warner Bros.	Samuel Bronston	John Farrow	Robert Stack & Marisa Pavan			Filmed in Technirama
1961	King of Kings	MGM	Samuel Bronston	Nicholas Ray	Jeffrey Hunter			Filmed in Super Technirama 70; Nominated for Golden Globe for Best Original Score (Miklós Rózsa)
1961	El Cid	Allied Artists	Samuel Bronston	Anthony Mann	Charlton Heston & Sophia Loren		Best Art Direction; Best Original Song (Miklós Rózsa & Paul Francis Webster); Best Original Score (Miklós Rózsa)	Filmed in Super Technirama 70; Won Golden Globe Special Merit Award (Samuel Bronston); Nominated for Golden Globe for Best Motion Picture – Drama; Nominated for Golden Globe for Best Director (Anthony Mann); Nominated for Golden Globe for Best Original Score (Miklós Rózsa)
1963	55 Days at Peking	Allied Artists	Samuel Bronston	Nicholas Ray	Charlton Heston & Ava Gardner		Best Original Song (Dimitri Tiomkin & Paul Francis Webster); Best Original Score (Dimitri Tiomkin)	Filmed in Super Technirama 70
1964	The Fall of the Roman Empire	Paramount	Samuel Bronston	Anthony Mann	Sophia Loren & Stephen Boyd		Best Original Score (Dimitri Tiomkin)	Filmed in Ultra Panavision 70; Won Golden Globe for Best Original Score (Dimitri Tiomkin)
1964	Circus World	Paramount	Samuel Bronston	Henry Hathaway	John Wayne & Rita Hayworth			Filmed in Super Technirama 70; Won Golden Globe for Best Original Song (Dimitri Tiomkin & Ned Washington); Nominated for Golden Globe for Best Actress – Motion Picture Drama (Rita Hayworth)

== List of unproduced films ==
Series	Title	Description
Feature film	The Story of Nelson	According to The New York Times, John Farrow had signed a three picture-deal with Bronston, which included John Paul Jones and King of Kings. The third unproduced project was The Story of Nelson, a biography of Horatio Nelson written by William Henry Giles Kingston.
Feature film	The Sad Knight of La Mancha	In April 1960, Variety announced that Bronston was producing an adaptation of Don Quixote, tentatively titled The Sad Knight of La Mancha. Hugo Fregonese was to direct, with the final script revisions being made by Carlos Blanco, a Spanish screenwriter. Filming was reported to begin in the same year.
Feature film	Carmen	Also, in April 1960, the Los Angeles Times reported Bronston was also producing a film adaptation of the opera Carmen.
Feature film	Captain Kidd	In the same Los Angeles Times report, Bronston was stated to be developing a biographical film of Captain William Kidd.
Feature film	The French Revolution	In September 1961, Bronston announced he was planning a trilogy of historical epics in Spain, which included 55 Days at Peking and The Fall of the Roman Empire. The third unproduced film was tentatively titled The French Revolution. According to The New York Times, the project was to chronicle "the events and international consequences of the uprising from the beginning until the arrival of Napoleon upon the scene." Pre-production was scheduled to begin in the summer of 1962, with Nicholas Ray to direct and Philip Yordan to write the script. However, both men decided instead to work on 55 Days at Peking.
Feature film	Dear and Glorious Physician	In September 1962, it was announced Bronston and Frank Capra had partnered to produce a film adaptation of Taylor Caldwell's 1959 biography of Luke the Evangelist.
Feature film	Paris 1900	In 1962, Bronston had hired Vittorio De Sica to film an historical drama titled Paris 1900. In December 1962, David Niven, who had co-starred in 55 Days at Peking, had been cast in a lead role. Details about the project are scarce, but it was to center on the Belle Époque period. The title also alludes to the 1900 Paris Exposition.
Feature film	Nightrunners of Bengal	In May 1963, the Los Angeles Times reported that John Wayne was slated to film another project for Bronston Productions, titled Nightrunners of Bengal, which chronicled the Indian Rebellion of 1857. Henry Hathaway, who was directing Wayne in Circus World, was reportedly set to direct. Hathaway later dropped out, and was replaced by Richard Fleischer. A limited partnership company called Bronston–Bengal had been formed for the film's production, with Pierre S. du Pont III as a partner. By February 1967, the project had stalled in development for nearly three years due to Bronston's bankruptcy problems.
Feature film	The Blue and Grey Line on the Nile	In 1963, Bronston announced he was developing The Blue and Grey Line on the Nile, an adaptation of the 1961 historical book by William B. Hesseltine and Hazel C. Wolf. It tells of Union and Confederate veterans of the Civil War who were enlisted to fight for the Egyptian government. In December 1963, Bronston Productions partnered with Paramount Pictures on a four-film distribution deal, which included producing and releasing the project.
Feature film	The Great Cyrus	In the same report, Bronston was stated to be developing a film adaptation of the book The Great Cyrus written by Harold Lamb.
Feature film	Brave New World	By 1964, Bronston had planned to adapt Aldous Huxley's novel Brave New World into a feature-length epic, with Jack Cardiff hired to direct. Nigel Kneale had written a script adaptation. However, plans were shelved after Bronston filed for bankruptcy protection in June 1964.
Feature film	Isabella of Spain	In April 1966, Bronston announced a biographical epic film about Isabella of Spain was in development. In 1971, Ronald Neame was hired to direct and John Peebles had written a script. Glenda Jackson was cast in the title role while John Philip Law was to portray her spouse and co-ruler Ferdinand II. However, by June 1971, the film's development had been halted, and Bronston was forced to auction all assets from within his studios. Within two years, in 1973, Bronston moved to Dallas and formed Bronston Film International Inc., with plans to film the project there.

== Works cited ==
- Besas, Peter (1985). Behind the Spanish Lens: Spanish Cinema under Fascism and Democracy. Denver, Colorado: Arden Press. ISBN 0912869062.
- Darby, William (2009). Anthony Mann: The Film Career. McFarland & Company. ISBN 978-0-786-43839-6.
- Eisenschitz, Bernard (1993). Nicholas Ray: An American Journey. Faber and Faber. ISBN 978-0-571-17830-8.
- Eyman, Scott (2014). John Wayne: The Life and Legend. Simon & Schuster. ISBN 978-1439199589.
- Fleischer, Richard (1993). Just Tell Me When to Cry: A Memoir. Carroll & Graf. ISBN 978-0-881-84944-8.
- Martin, Mel (2007). The Magnificent Showman: The Epic Films of Samuel Bronston. BearManor Media. ISBN 978-1-593-93129-2.
- Rosendorf, Neal (2000). The Life and Times of Samuel Bronston, Builder of 'Hollywood in Madrid': A Study in the International Scope and Influence of American Pop Culture (PhD thesis). Harvard University.
- Rosendorf, Neal (March 2007). "Hollywood in Madrid: American Film Producers and the Franco Regime, 1950–1970". Historical Journal of Film, Radio and Television. 27 (1): 77–109. doi:10.1080/01439680601177155. S2CID 191616477.
- Rosendorf, Neal (2014). Franco Sells Spain to America: Hollywood, Tourism and Public Relations as Postwar Spanish Soft Power. Palgrave Macmillan. ISBN 978-1-137-29928-4.
- Rubin, Steven Jay (2011). Combat Films: American Realism, 1945–2010 (Second ed.). Jefferson, North Carolina: McFarland. ISBN 978-0-786-48613-7.
