= King of Kings (1961 film) =

1961 film of the life of Jesus Christ

- Theatrical release poster by Reynold Brown
- Directed by: Nicholas Ray
- Written by: Philip Yordan
- Based on: The New Testament (Matthew, Mark, Luke, and John)
- Produced by: Samuel Bronston
- Starring: Jeffrey Hunter; Siobhán McKenna; Hurd Hatfield; Ron Randell; Viveca Lindfors; Rita Gam; Carmen Sevilla; Brigid Bazlen; Harry Guardino; Rip Torn; Frank Thring; Guy Rolfe; Maurice Marsac; Grégoire Aslan; Robert Ryan
- Narrated by: Orson Welles
- Cinematography: Manuel Berenguer; Milton R. Krasner; Franz Planer
- Edited by: Harold F. Kress; Renée Lichtig
- Music by: Miklós Rózsa
- Production company: Samuel Bronston Productions
- Distributed by: Metro-Goldwyn-Mayer
- Release dates: October 11, 1961 (Loew's State Theatre); October 13, 1961 (United States); November 15, 1961 (United Kingdom)
- Running time: 171 minutes (excluding overture, intermission, entr'acte, and exit music.)
- Country: United States
- Language: English
- Budget: $7–8.5 million
- Box office: $13.4 million

King of Kings is a 1961 American epic religious film directed by Nicholas Ray and produced by Samuel Bronston for Metro-Goldwyn-Mayer (MGM). Adapted from the New Testament, the film tells the story of Jesus of Nazareth from his birth and ministry to his crucifixion and resurrection. It stars Jeffrey Hunter as Jesus, with Siobhán McKenna, Robert Ryan, Viveca Lindfors, Ron Randell, Hurd Hatfield, Carmen Sevilla and Rip Torn and is narrated by Orson Welles.

Throughout the 1950s, John Farrow began developing a proposed film project based on the life of Jesus, tentatively titled Son of Man. In November 1958, actual development started when Farrow partnered with Samuel Bronston following their collaboration on John Paul Jones (1959). By the next year, Farrow left the project due to creative differences, and Nicholas Ray was hired as director. Ray then hired screenwriter Philip Yordan to write a new script. Filming commenced in April 1960 and wrapped in October 1960.

Financing of the film was initially provided by Pierre S. du Pont III and other private investors. During production, Bronston signed guarantee bonds with MGM, who became interested in the film following their success with Ben-Hur (1959). With MGM involved, mandatory rewrites and additional scenes were added to the film. Reshoots took place in December 1960 and again in May 1961.

The film premiered at Loew's State Theatre in New York City on October 11, 1961. It premiered in Los Angeles on October 12 and opened there on October 13. During its initial release, it received mixed reviews from film critics, but was a box office success. Miklós Rózsa was nominated for a Golden Globe Award for Best Original Score.

== Plot ==
In 63 BC, under General Pompey, the Romans conquer Jerusalem and sack the city. He arrives at the Temple and massacres the priests. Desiring the temple's treasures, he enters the Holy of Holies but finds only the Torah scrolls. Pompey takes the scrolls and holds them over a fire until an old priest reaches for them imploringly. Pompey relents and hands the scroll to the old man. Pompey then leaves to carry out massacres of villages and towns.

Many years later, a series of rebellions break out against Rome's authority. The Romans crucify many of the leaders and place Herod the Great on Judea's throne. A carpenter named Joseph and his wife Mary, who is about to give birth, arrive in Bethlehem for the census. Unable to find lodging, they take refuge in a stable, where Jesus is born. Joseph is seen with Shepherds when the Magi from the East enter to worship Jesus and give him gifts. Herod, however, informed of the birth of a child-king, orders the Roman centurion Lucius to take his men to Bethlehem and kill all newborn male children.

Mary and Joseph flee to Egypt with the child. The Massacre of the Innocents occurs. Herod dies, killed in his death throes by his son Herod Antipas, who then takes power. In Nazareth, Jesus, now twelve, works with Joseph when soldiers arrive under Lucius, who realizes Jesus escaped the massacre. Lucius asks only that Mary and Joseph register their son's birth before the year's end.

Years later, Jewish rebels led by Barabbas and Judas Iscariot prepare to attack a caravan carrying the next governor of Judaea, Pontius Pilate, and his wife Claudia, daughter of Tiberius Caesar. The ambush fails, partly thanks to Lucius's diligence, and Barabbas and Judas flee for their lives.

Pilate and Herod meet on the banks of the River Jordan, where John the Baptist preaches to the crowds. Jesus arrives here, now 30 years of age. Recognizing him as the Messiah, John baptizes Jesus, who then goes into the desert and is tempted by Satan. Afterward, Jesus travels to Galilee, where he recruits his Apostles.

In Jerusalem, Herod arrests John. Judas leaves Barabbas and joins the Apostles. Jesus begins preaching and gathers crowds, including Claudia and Lucius. Herod reluctantly beheads John on the whim of his stepdaughter, Salome, who despises John.

Herod, Pilate, and the High Priest Caiaphas are troubled by Jesus' works and miracles. Barabbas leads a revolt in Jerusalem during Passover, but when the rebels storm the Antonia Fortress, Pilate's legions, having learned of the plot, ambush and crush the revolt, massacring the rebels. Barabbas, the sole survivor, is arrested.

Jesus meets the disciples on Thursday evening and has one last supper with them. He then goes to pray at Gethsemane before Judas delivers him to the Jewish authorities. They bring Jesus before Caiaphas and then Pilate. Pilate starts the trial, but sensing that the issue is one of Jewish sensibilities, sends him to Herod, who, in turn, sends him back.

Pilate, infuriated, commands his soldiers to scourge Jesus. The people demand the release of Barabbas. Pilate reluctantly complies and sentences Jesus to be crucified. Jesus, wearing a crown of thorns, carries his cross to Golgotha where he is crucified with two thieves, one of them being the penitent Dismas and the other, the impentient Gestas.

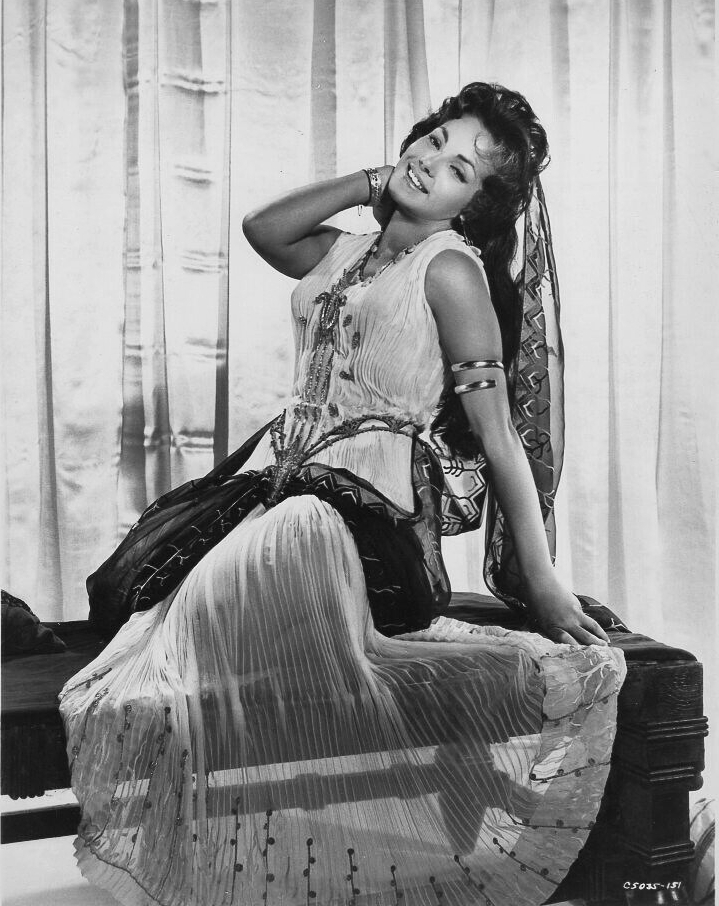
Carmen Sevilla as Mary Magdalene in a publicity photo for the film

Desperate because he has betrayed Jesus to his death, Judas hangs himself. Barabbas finds his body. Jesus dies in front of his mother, the apostle John, a few soldiers, Claudia, and Lucius, who says, "He is truly the Christ." Jesus' body is taken down from the cross and is carried to a rock tomb. Two days later, Mary Magdalene finds the tomb empty and encounters the risen Jesus.

On the shores of Lake Tiberias, Jesus appears to the apostles for, according to the narration, "a final time" and tells them to bring his message to the ends of the world. Only his shadow is visible, forming a cross. It falls on the stretched-out fishing nets. The apostles then leave. Jesus' shadow falls across the screen as the film ends.

== Cast ==
- Jeffrey Hunter as Jesus
- Siobhán McKenna as Mary
- Hurd Hatfield as Pontius Pilate
- Ron Randell as Lucius of Cyrene
- Viveca Lindfors as Claudia Procula
- Rita Gam as Herodias
- Carmen Sevilla as Mary Magdalene
- Brigid Bazlen as Salomé
- Harry Guardino as Barabbas
- Rip Torn as Judas Iscariot
- Frank Thring as Herod Antipas
- Guy Rolfe as Caiaphas
- Royal Dano as Peter
- Robert Ryan as John the Baptist
- Edric Connor as Balthazar
- Maurice Marsac as Nicodemus
- Grégoire Aslan as Herod the Great
- George Coulouris as Camel Driver
- Conrado San Martín as Pompey
- Gérard Tichy as Joseph
- Antonio Mayans as John the Apostle (credited as José Antonio)
- Luis Prendes as Dismas, the Penitent Thief
- David Davies as Burly Man
- José Nieto as Caspar
- Rubén Rojo as Matthew
- Fernando Sancho as the Demon-Possessed man
- Michael Wager as Thomas
- Félix de Pomés as Joseph of Arimathea
- Adriano Rimoldi as Melchior
- Barry Keegan as Gestas, the impenitent thief
- Rafael Luis Calvo as Simon of Cyrene
- Tino Barrero as Andrew
- Paco Morán as Blind Man of Bethsaida (credited as Francisco Moran)

=== Uncredited Cast ===
- John Kerr as a Man at the Sermon on the Mount
- Ray Milland as the voice of Satan
- Orson Welles as the Narrator

== Production ==
=== Development ===
In February 1951, it was reported that director John Farrow was developing a film on the life of Jesus, his script being titled Son of Man. He had also intended to produce the film independently for less than $800,000. By November 1951, it was reported that the project was under development at the Nassour Studios and that Farrow was conducting a search for an actor for the title role. When asked of the requirements he desired, Farrow replied, "High personal character and a good actor."

However, by August 1953, Farrow was contracted to direct The Sea Chase (1955) with Warner Bros. In February 1954, the Los Angeles Times reported that Farrow was likely to begin development on Son of Man following the completion of The Sea Chase. It was speculated that it would be shot in England and that Jesus would not be shown directly, although Farrow did not confirm these statements. Shooting was scheduled to begin by summer 1954. It was ultimately set aside when, in April 1955, Farrow signed to direct Around the World in Eighty Days (1956), from which he was later fired after nearly a week of shooting.

In January 1956, Variety reported that Farrow was in negotiations with RKO Pictures to finance and distribute Son of Man. Two months later, in March, Farrow began a search for an unknown actor to portray Jesus on the condition that he would not appear in another film, television, or stage production for up to 20 years. However, these plans were again postponed when, in October 1957, Farrow signed on to direct John Paul Jones (1959) for Samuel Bronston. A year later, Farrow and Bronston formed a production company, Brofar, as they planned to produce a second project.

In November 1958, it was reported that Bronston and Farrow were collaborating on a film project based on the life of Jesus. In May 1959, it was reported that Sonya Levien had been hired to write the final script. However, by October 1959, Farrow had left the project over creative differences. Farrow later explained that in the context of Jesus's trial, Bronston wanted him to "whitewash the Jewish leaders, and lay blame entirely on the Romans. I refused to make these changes. I quit." Additionally, associate producer Alan Brown stated the "script was not really a script, it was the Four Gospels put down, and Sam called me and said, 'I cannot even understand this, it's all Thee and Thou and everything else.'"

In November 1959, Nicholas Ray signed on to direct the project. With set construction nearly complete, Ray asked screenwriter Philip Yordan, whom he previously worked with on Johnny Guitar (1954) to rewrite the script. Ray explained, "I asked for him and made concessions to have him. They had asked me to write it. I didn't feel up to the responsibility; I am as impatient with the other writer on my own screenplay as with others."

Yordan recalled, "I didn't want to go to Spain, but he asked me to just come over there for the weekend. The picture was called Son of Man. Terrible title, and someone had taken chapters of the Bible and sort of tried to make it play, but it was awful." He then recommended re-titling the script to King of Kings, but was reminded the title had been used for the 1927 film of the life of Jesus directed by Cecil B. DeMille. Yordan retorted the title was in the public domain, and it was later discovered DeMille had not registered the title. Yordan promptly registered the title with the Motion Picture Association of America (MPAA).

Yordan wrote a new script in six weeks, which Bronston liked so much that he encouraged him to stay in Madrid. There, Yordan later co-wrote the script for El Cid (1961). Yordan did not find writing the script to be difficult, observing that "Christ was a loner. He's not much different than my usual character. The Western character. It's the same character. The man alone."

To assure the script was faithful to the Gospels, Bronston hired several Biblical scholars, which included playwright Diego Fabbri and theologian professor George Kilpatrick, who wrote the books The Origins of the Gospel According to St. Matthew (1946) and The Trial of Jesus (1953). On March 8, 1960, Pope John XXIII approved the film's script while he met with Bronston at the Vatican. Even during filming, Ray continued to work on the script with Yordan and Kilpatrick, who remained on hand as a consultant. Ray wrote to Bronston that thanks to Kilpatrick, he had solved the dramatic problem of how to depict the trial of Jesus.

=== Casting ===
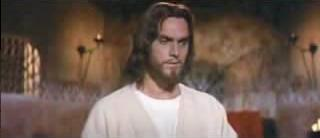
Jeffrey Hunter as Jesus in King of Kings

Several actors were considered to play the role of Jesus. In May 1959, it was reported that Alec Guinness had met with Bronston to discuss playing the role. Nicholas Ray, as director, considered Peter Cushing, Tom Fleming, Christopher Plummer, and Max von Sydow (who would later play the role in The Greatest Story Ever Told in 1965) for the role of Jesus.

On April 21, 1960, Jeffrey Hunter was cast as Jesus. The idea to cast Hunter came from John Ford, who suggested him to Nicholas Ray after directing Hunter in The Searchers (1956). Ray was familiar with Hunter, having directed him in The True Story of Jesse James (1957). Bronston agreed mainly because of Hunter's striking eyes, explaining that "I really chose him for his eyes. It was important that the man playing Christ have memorable eyes." After he finished filming for Hell to Eternity (1960), Hunter was given the script and took the role.

Other prominent actors were pursued for supporting roles. In April 1960, it was reported that Orson Welles and Richard Burton were cast as Herod the Great and Herod Antipas respectively. Alternately, on April 21, the day of Hunter's casting, it was reported that Burton was attached to play a centurion and that James Mason was being considered for Pontius Pilate. In the following month, however, Burton left the role when he was refused top billing.

In May 1960, Grace Kelly turned down the offer to portray Mary, mother of Jesus. The role later went to Siobhán McKenna, while Hurd Hatfield was cast as Pontius Pilate. That same month, it was announced that Viveca Lindfors, Rita Gam, Frank Thring, and Ron Randell had joined the cast. Several of the supporting parts were cast with local English-speaking Spanish actors whom Bronston collected through a "workshop" program.

=== Filming ===
In 1959, Bronston had established his eponymous production studio in Spain where he noticed that the rugged countryside resembled Judea. Principal photography began on April 24, 1960, at the Sevilla and Chamartín Studios, near Madrid, where 396 sets were constructed for the film. The set used for the Second Temple, constructed at the Sevilla studios, was blown down during a hurricane. Bronston surveyed the site and ordered it to be rebuilt, which was completed in three months.

The film was shot on multiple locations throughout Spain. The Venta de Frascuelas near the rocky terrains of Chinchón was used for the Sermon on the Mount. The Adaja in El Fresno was used to represent the Jordan River. In Almería, the Rambla de Lanujar used for the wilderness where Jesus was tempted. The Añover de Tajo in province of Toledo substituted for the Mount of Olives. The municipalities of Manzanares el Real and Navacerrada were used for the scenes set in Nazareth and Golgotha, respectively.

For the film, Bronston continued his pre-selling financial method, through which private investors financed the film's production budget. According to Variety, Pierre S. du Pont III contributed nearly $1.4 million of the film's initial $7 million production budget. After the 1960 Cannes Film Festival, MGM studio president Joseph Vogel visited the set in Madrid and viewed dailies of the unfinished film. Impressed, Vogel alerted production head Sol C. Siegel, who also visited the set. Both executives became interested in securing the distribution rights due to their concurrent success of Ben-Hur (1959), which was still in wide release. MGM did not provide any financing for the film, but Bronston signed guarantee bonds to ensure the film's completion.

Siegel however recommended various changes, feeling the film was too long, needed more action, and had a weak ending. An original character named "David", portrayed by Richard Johnson, was written into the film to bridge the scenes of Jesus and Barabbas. Due to the heavy deviations to the film's shooting script, Ray and Yordan were no longer on speaking terms, communicating only through walkie-talkies.

In July 1960, the Sermon on the Mount was filmed near Venta de Frascuelas, southeast of Madrid. The scene was required lengthy preparation, in which there were 81 individual Super Technirama camera set-ups. The scene took three weeks to film. 7,000 extras were gathered from 24 villages in the surrounding area, though Ray's biographer Bernard Eisenschitz has stated an alternate number of 5,400. Agnes Moorehead was hired as Hunter's speech coach, in which she advised him to lower the pitch of his voice to appear more commanding. Hunter recalled, "To my astonishment, quite a few dropped to their knees and made the sign of the cross as I passed by. They knew perfectly well of course that I was merely an actor playing a part." Ray was impressed with the professionialism of the untrained extras and their ability to express emotion. However, certain segments of the scene had to be re-shot as the sign of the cross did not exist at the time.

While the Sermon on the Mount was being filmed, Franz Planer, the film's cinematographer, became ill. Manuel Berengeur, who had worked with him since the start of production, replaced him but MGM sent out contract cinematographer Milton R. Krasner to take over. In September 1960, Arthur Resse, who had been serving as a horse trainer, was killed in an automobile accident, which also injured actor Harry Guardino (who was portraying Barabbas) as the two were en route from a location outside Aranjuez. Around this time, Ray, who was overwhelmed with the production woes, was temporarily replaced by Charles Walters. On October 4, 1960, principal photography was completed.

=== Post-production ===
The film's rough cut was edited by Renée Lichtig, who was Ray's frequent film editor. She once stated, "I shut myself away. I had thirteen-and-a-half reels of rushes to get down to a reel and a half. I showed it to Nick, and he just said one thing: 'Tremendous job.' Not much of that survived." On October 11, 1960, their rough cut was handed to MGM in exchange for $6 million. Lichtig stated, "The film was taken out of Nick's hands. He came to me one day and said, with tears in his eyes, "That's it, Renée, it's all over."' Afterwards, Ray left Spain and went home in Italy with his family.

The rest of the film's editing was done at MGM in Culver City, California. Margaret Booth, the supervising head of MGM's editing department, requested some certain scenes were re-shot and added. One of the edits made was the deletion of Richard Johnson's scenes. Harold F. Kress was hired to reconstruct a new edit. A month later, in November, Bronston asked Ray to finish the edit in California. From November 28 to December 13, Ray supervised the edit and the post-production dubbing in an attempt to salvage what he could.

Because Richard Johnson's character was removed, Ray and Ray Bradbury wrote a new scene, suggested by Bernard Smith, in which Barrabas and the Zealots forge a Roman fortress to take advantage of Jesus's triumphal entry into Jerusalem. In December 1960, the forge attack was filmed in three days, with George Folsey as the cinematographer.

Bradbury also wrote the film's new ending, as well as wrote the narration in order to connect the disparate plot sections. Orson Welles was hired to provide the narration, which was recorded in London. Welles insisted on pronouncing the word 'apostles' with a hard 't' instead of the normally silent 't'.

Bradbury wrote an ending in which the resurrected Jesus commissions the disciples to preach the Gospel. Then, he elevates as he walks towards the horizontal shores of Galilee leaving only his visible footprints to be covered with blowing dust. The disciples would also leave footprints in all four directions to be covered with dust. That ending, however, was deemed too expensive to be filmed. The version used in the final film was a shadow of Jesus, which looms larger to form a cross with the fishing nets left along the shore. The scene was used as test footage for lighting and was incorporated into the film without Ray's involvement.

On April 21, 1961, the film's first sneak preview was screened at the Kachina Theater in Scottsdale, Arizona. Bronston, Vogel, Siegel, and other MGM executives attended the screening. The film ran two hours and forty-five minutes. The Sermon on the Mount received one of the most positive test audience responses. After the sneak preview, MGM felt another scene of Mary, the mother of Jesus, and Mary Magdalene was needed, which was filmed at the MGM-British Studios near London on May 8.

== Music ==
Miklós Rózsa was hired to compose the score, which was recorded using a 74-piece symphony orchestra and a choir of 50 people.

== Release ==
In June 1960, MGM had acquired the distribution rights to King of Kings, intending it for a follow-up roadshow film to Ben-Hur (1959). The film premiered at the Loew's State Theatre in New York City on October 11, 1961. It began roadshow engagements in 22 key cities throughout the United States.

=== Home media ===
King of Kings was released by Warner Home Video as a DVD on October 5, 1999, and February 6, 2003, as a Blu-ray on July 28, 2009, and as a Region 1 widescreen disc on March 29, 2011. It has since been available for online streaming and download through Amazon, Apple iTunes Store and Vudu.

== Reception ==
=== Critical reaction ===
Time wrote a negative review describing the film as "[i]ncontestably the corniest, phoniest, ickiest and most monstrously vulgar of all the big Bible stories Hollywood has told in the last decade". Bosley Crowther of The New York Times wrote that the movie had "the nature of an illustrated lecture" and was a "peculiarly impersonal film that constructs a great deal of random action around Jesus and does very little to construct a living personality for Him." Robert J. Landry of Variety praised the film as "a major motion picture by any standard" that not only "succeeds as spectacle" but also "succeeds in touching the heart." Philip K. Scheuer of the Los Angeles Times wrote, "It is not great art, nor is it the definitive photoplay about Jesus (will there ever be one?), but it is at least permeated by a soberness of purpose that, allowing for ordinary human fallibility, can be tacitly felt and respected. Technically, of course, it is far glossier than the C.B. DeMille movie of 1927, and very probably at least its equal in effectiveness. Dramatically, I think, it falls somewhere between the theatrical entertainment that was Ben-Hur and the spiritual but spiritless Francis of Assisi."

Harrison's Reports awarded its top grade of "Excellent" and declared that the film "will not only stamp its enduring imprint on the glorious history book of the motion picture industry, but will leave its memorable impact on the minds of all those millions who see it." Richard L. Coe of The Washington Post, however, panned the film as "a picture which never should have been made" because of the portrayal of Jesus as "a universal, non-controversial figure," explaining that "to excise His dynamic, revolutionary concepts is to make His journey on earth a hollow ritual, a pointless fairy tale, an essay on How to Live Dangerously and Still Win." The Monthly Film Bulletin stated: "As, simply, a version of the infinitely well-known story, it has some curious interpolations (Christ's visit to John the Baptist in his cell) and omissions. The overwhelming failure, though, is in finding any kind of style, in imagery, dialogue or music, which goes beyond the most insipidly conventional kind of Bible illustrations."

Among later reviews, Leonard Maltin's home video guide awarded the film three-and-a-half stars out of four, and Geoff Andrew called it "one of the most interesting screen versions of the Gospels," adding that "some of the performances appear to lack depth, but one can't deny the effectiveness of Miklós Rózsa's fine score, and of Ray's simple but elegant visuals which achieve a stirring dramatic power untainted by pompous bombast." Musicians such as Grammy Award-winning Art Greenhaw have cited the movie as being an influence in their work and even their favorite film of all time. On the review aggregator website Rotten Tomatoes, King of Kings holds an approval rating of 82% based on 17 reviews with an average rating of 6.20/10. The website's critical consensus reads: "With enough narrative depth to anchor the expected spectacle, King of Kings is a true blessing for fans of Biblical epics."

Filmink argued "Hunter‘s performance is absolutely fine... To be fair, Jesus isn’t much of a role (even Max Von Sydow struggled to make it interesting) and Hunter’s calmness (or lack of personality if you want to be mean) suits how the filmmakers want to play it."

The film's music score, composed by Miklós Rózsa, was nominated for a Golden Globe Award for Best Original Score. That same year, Rózsa was also nominated in the same category for his score of El Cid, which likewise was produced by Bronston.

=== Box office ===
According to MGM's records, King of Kings earned $8 million in North America and $5.4 million overseas, earning a profit of $1,621,000. According to Kinematograph Weekly the film was considered a "money maker" at the British box office in 1962.

== See also ==
- The Greatest Story Ever Told – the 1965 religious epic of the life of Jesus, directed by George Stevens
- List of Easter films

== Bibliography ==
- Eisenschitz, Bernard (1993). Nicholas Ray: An American Journey. Faber and Faber. ISBN 978-0-571-17830-8.
- Green, Paul (2014). Jeffrey Hunter: The Film, Television, Radio and Stage Performances. McFarland. ISBN 978-0-786478-68-2.
- Martin, Mel (2007). The Magnificent Showman: The Epic Films of Samuel Bronston. BearManor Media. ISBN 978-1-593-93129-2.
- McGilligan, Patrick (1997). "Philip Yordan". Backstory 2: Interviews with Screenwriters of the 1940s and 1950s. University of California Press. ISBN 978-0-520209-08-4.
- Reid, John Howard (2013). Big Screen Bible Lore. Lulu Press. ISBN 978-1-304300-30-0.
