= Veniero Colasanti =

Italian costume designer

- Born: 21 July 1910; Rome, Italy
- Died: 3 June 1996 (aged 85)

Veniero Colasanti (21 July 1910 – 3 June 1996) was an Italian costume designer, set decorator and art director. He was nominated for an Academy Award in the category Best Art Direction for the film El Cid. During the 1960s and 1970s, he also worked for the Salzburg Festivals where he designed the settings for Il rappresentazione die anima e di corpo, Der Rosenkavalier and Jedermann in cooperation with John Moore.

== Selected filmography ==
- Thrill (1941)
- A Garibaldian in the Convent (1942)
- Alone at Last (1942)
- El Cid (1961)
- Satyricon (1969)
