= Jack London (film) =

1943 film by Alfred Santell

- Film poster
- Directed by: Alfred Santell
- Written by: Ernest Pascal
- Based on: The Book of Jack London by Charmian London
- Produced by: Samuel Bronston
- Starring: Michael O'Shea; Susan Hayward; Osa Massen
- Cinematography: John W. Boyle; Lee Garmes
- Edited by: William H. Ziegler
- Music by: Fredric Efrem Rich
- Production company: Samuel Bronston Productions
- Distributed by: United Artists
- Release date: December 24, 1943
- Running time: 94 minutes
- Country: United States
- Language: English
- Box office: over $900,000

Jack London, also known as The Story of Jack London, is a 1943 American biographical film made by Samuel Bronston Productions and distributed by United Artists. It was directed by Alfred Santell and produced by Samuel Bronston with Joseph H. Nadel as associate producer, from a screenplay by Isaac Don Levine and Ernest Pascal based on the 1921 book The Book of Jack London by London's second wife, Charmian London.

The film starred Michael O'Shea as Jack London and Susan Hayward with Osa Massen, Harry Davenport, Frank Craven and Virginia Mayo.

== Plot ==
The film follows scenes from the life of the writer-adventurer Jack London (Michael O'Shea, who somewhat resembled London) who was, among other things, oyster pirate, hobo, sailor, prospector and war correspondent. The film begins and ends with footage from 1943 of the launch of the Liberty ship Jack London. In Oakland in 1890, after an accident involving a female colleague at the factory where he works, the young London quits and borrows money to buy a boat in which to illegally harvest oysters. The boat is soon impounded by police, one of his partners killed, and he is left without means. London signs on as an able seaman on a five-month trip to the Bering Sea, during which he begins to write. A brief stay at university proves frustrating as his stories are dismissed as "raw" despite London's defence of them as observed occurrences. He moves to the Yukon where he writes a story about a bar singer. Snowed in for months he writes Call of the Wild, which he sells to a publisher, who compares him to Rudyard Kipling, one of London's idols. The publisher introduces him to Charmian Kittredge (Susan Hayward). By the turn of the century London's career has taken off. He is asked by a newspaper to cover the Boer War, but on arrival at Plymouth, the war has already ended. London returns to Charmian.

Despite a promise not to leave Charmian again, London is given another foreign correspondent assignment, this time to Japan, where he is told of the start of the Russo-Japanese War. In Korea, an army captain reveals the Japanese aim to sack Manchuria and then Mongolia for raw materials as part of a long-term plan to conquer China, and then dominate the US and England. London's coverage of the taking of the Yalu River proves a scoop. However, he is arrested on charges of spying for Russia, and in a brutal prison witnesses the murder of his fellow inmates by the Japanese. Eventually, London is freed after the intervention of the White House. Back in the US, London attempts but fails to sell articles attesting to his view that there is a coming threat from Japan.

== Cast ==
- Michael O'Shea as Jack London
- Susan Hayward as Charmian Kittredge
- Osa Massen as Freda Maloof
- Harry Davenport as Prof. Hilliard
- Frank Craven as Old Tom
- Virginia Mayo as Marnie
- Ralph Morgan as George Brett
- Jonathan Hale as Kerwin Maxwell
- Louise Beavers as Mammy Jenny
- Leonard Strong as Captain Tanaka
- Regis Toomey as Scratch Nelson
- Paul Hurst as 'Lucky Luke' Lannigan
- Lumsden Hare as English Correspondent
- Hobart Cavanaugh as Mike, Saloonkeeper
- Conway Morgan as Richard Harding Davos
- Robert Homans as Captain Allen
- Wallis Clark as Theodore Roosevelt (uncredited)
- Pierre Watkin as American Consul (uncredited)
