= Joseph Vogel (executive) =

American film maker (1895–1969)

- Born: September 7, 1895; New York, U.S.
- Died: March 1, 1969 (aged 73); Palm Beach, Florida, U.S.
- Occupation: Film studio executive
- Known for: President of Metro-Goldwyn-Mayer
- Spouse: Lena Lloyd
- Children: 1

Joseph Richard Vogel (September 7, 1895 – March 1, 1969) was an American executive best known for his stint at Metro-Goldwyn-Mayer, including a reign as president from 1956 to 1963.

== Biography ==
Vogel was born in New York and attended Townsend Harris High School. He started working part-time as an usher at the Loew's Palace Theatre in Brownsville, Brooklyn and at age 18 was appointed manager of the Fulton Theatre for Loew's. He became the manager of Loew's State Theatre in New York City when it opened in August 1921. He worked his way up Loew's Theatres and by 1934 was in charge of all their theatres outside New York. In 1939 he became a director of Loew's Inc. and by 1945 became director for all their theatres.

In 1954 following a government decree separating Loew's production and distribution actives from the exhibition company, Vogel was elected president of Loew's Theatres Inc.

=== MGM presidency ===
In October 1956 Vogel replaced Arthur M. Loew, son of founder Marcus Loew, as president of Loew's Inc., which was renamed MGM Inc.

MGM had been loss-making and had to deal with a significant corporate turmoil, including a takeover attempt in 1957 from former president Louis B. Mayer in association with two board members, Stanley Meyer and Joseph Tomlinson. Mayer attacked Vogel calling him a "fool" and not "capable of filling the post – no more capable of filling it than you would be fighting the heavyweight champion." However Vogel managed to fight off the takeover attempt and Mayer died of leukemia in 1957.

Vogel and his head of production Sol Siegel initially enjoyed a number of successful years at MGM, green lighting such movies as Gigi (1958), North by Northwest (1959), King of Kings (1961) and most notably Ben-Hur (1959). Gigi and Ben-Hur won the Academy Award for Best Picture back-to-back. Ben-Hur, which Vogel had insisted be made against the will of the board, was the second highest-grossing film of all time behind the studio's Gone With the Wind and helped make the company profitable again. He also made the costly How the West Was Won (1962) against the will of the board, but it was also a hit.

However he also oversaw a number of expensive flops, such as the remakes of Cimarron (1960), Four Horsemen of the Apocalypse (1961), and especially Mutiny on the Bounty (1962), which ultimately caused millions in losses.

Vogel was forced to resign in January 1963, replaced by Robert O'Brien and was moved upstairs to the role of chairman. Four months later he retired to Palm Beach, Florida. He had surgery for brain cancer and died at Palm Beach hospital on March 1, 1969, of a heart attack. He was survived by a wife Lena and son Richard. He was the brother of cinematographer Paul C. Vogel.

In 1959 he was made Commander of the Order of Merit of the Italian Republic following completion of Ben-Hur.

== Notable films under his presidency ==
- The Reluctant Debutante (1958)
- Imitation General (1958)
- Cat on a Hot Tin Roof (1958)
- Torpedo Run (1958)
- The Badlanders
- The Tunnel of Love (1958)
- Some Came Running (1959)
- Green Mansions (1959)
- North by Northwest (1959)
- Ben-Hur (1959)
- Never So Few (1959)
- The Last Voyage (1960)
- Home from the Hill (1960)
- Bells Are Ringing (1960)
- BUtterfield 8 (1960)
- Where the Boys Are (1960)
- Cimarron (1960)
- The Honeymoon Machine (1961)
- King of Kings (1961)
- Bridge to the Sun (1961)
- Bachelor in Paradise (1961)
- The Four Horsemen of the Apocalypse (1962)
- Light in the Piazza (1962)
- Sweet Bird of Youth (1962)
- Lolita (1962)
- Ride the High Country (1961)
- The Wonderful World of the Brothers Grimm (1962)
- Two Weeks in Another Town (1962)
- How the West Was Won (1962)
- Mutiny on the Bounty (1962)
- Billy Rose's Jumbo (1962)
