= El Cid (film) =

1961 film by Anthony Mann

- Theatrical release poster
- Directed by: Anthony Mann
- Screenplay by: Philip Yordan; Fredric M. Frank; Ben Barzman
- Story by: Fredric M. Frank
- Produced by: Samuel Bronston
- Starring: Charlton Heston; Sophia Loren; Raf Vallone; Geneviève Page; John Fraser; Gary Raymond; Hurd Hatfield; Massimo Serato; Herbert Lom
- Cinematography: Robert Krasker
- Edited by: Robert Lawrence
- Music by: Miklós Rózsa
- Production companies: Samuel Bronston Productions; Dear Film Produzione
- Distributed by: Allied Artists (United States); Dear Film (Italy)
- Release date: December 6, 1961
- Running time: 184 minutes
- Countries: Italy; United States
- Language: English
- Budget: $7–9 million
- Box office: $26.6 million (US/CA)

El Cid is a 1961 epic historical drama film directed by Anthony Mann and produced by Samuel Bronston. The film is loosely based on the life of the 11th-century Castilian knight and warlord Rodrigo Díaz de Vivar, called "El Cid" (from the Arabic as-Sayyed السّيّد, meaning "The Lord"). The film stars Charlton Heston in the title role and Sophia Loren as El Cid's wife Doña Jimena, spelled "Chimene" in the script and pronounced that way (shim-ain) in the film. The screenplay is credited to Fredric M. Frank, Philip Yordan and Ben Barzman, with uncredited contributions by Bernard Gordon.

During the late 1950s, Samuel Bronston had established his own production studio in Madrid, Spain. To strengthen cordial ties to the Spanish government ruled by Francisco Franco, Bronston began developing a biographical film of El Cid. During his reign, Franco had admired and compared himself to El Cid. In 1960, Bronston purchased Frederic M. Frank's script, and hired Anthony Mann to direct the film. Philip Yordan was later hired to rewrite the script, although Mann later recruited Ben Barzman to write the final screenplay. Before principal photography began, Bronston purchased the rights to a rival biographical film developed by Cesáreo González's Aspa Films, making the film an Italian co-production. On a $7 million budget, filming of El Cid began in September 1960 and concluded in April 1961.

El Cid premiered on December 6, 1961 at the Metropole Theatre in London, and was released on December 14 in the United States. The film received largely positive reviews praising the performances of Heston and Loren, the cinematography, and the musical score. It went on to gross $26.6 million during its initial theatrical run. It was nominated for three Academy Awards for Best Art Direction, Best Music Score of a Dramatic or Comedy Picture, and Best Original Song.

== Plot ==
In 11th century General Ben Yusuf of the Almoravid dynasty has summoned all the emirs of Al-Andalus to North Africa. He chastises them for co-existing peacefully with their Christian neighbours, which goes against his dream of Islamic world domination. The emirs return to Spain with orders to resume hostilities with the Christians, while Ben Yusuf readies his army for a full-scale invasion.

Don Rodrigo Díaz de Vivar, on the way to his wedding with Doña Chimene, rescues a Spanish town from an invading Moorish army. Two of the emirs, al-Mu'tamin of Zaragoza and al-Kadir of Valencia, are captured. More interested in peace than in wreaking vengeance, Rodrigo escorts his prisoners to Vivar and releases them on the condition that they never again attack lands belonging to King Ferdinand of Castile. The emirs proclaim him "El Cid" (Castilian Spanish for the Arabic for milord: "al-Sidi") and swear allegiance to him.

For his act of mercy, Don Rodrigo is accused of treason by Count Ordóñez. In court, the charge is supported by Chimene's father, Count Gormaz, the king's champion. Rodrigo's aged father, Don Diego, angrily calls Gormaz a liar. Gormaz strikes Don Diego, challenging him to a duel. At a private meeting, Rodrigo begs Gormaz to ask the aged but proud Diego for forgiveness (for accusing Rodrigo of treason). Gormaz refuses, so Rodrigo fights the duel on Diego’s behalf and kills his opponent. Chimene witnesses the death of Gormaz and swears to avenge him, renouncing her affection for Rodrigo.

When the King of Aragon demands the city of Calahorra from Castile, Rodrigo asks Ferdinand to choose him as his champion. He wins the city in single combat to the death. In his new capacity he is sent on a mission to collect tribute from Moorish vassals to the Castilian crown. He asks that Chimene be given to him as his wife upon his return, so that he can provide for her. Chimene promises Count Ordóñez she will marry him instead if he kills Rodrigo. Ordóñez lays an ambush for Rodrigo and his men but is captured by al-Mu'tamin, to whom Rodrigo had earlier showed mercy. Rodrigo forgives the count and returns home to marry Chimene. The marriage is not consummated: Rodrigo will not touch her if she does not give herself to him out of love. Chimene instead goes to a convent.

King Ferdinand dies. His younger son, Prince Alfonso, tells the elder son, Prince Sancho, that their father wanted his kingdom divided among his heirs: Castile to Sancho, Asturias and León to Alfonso, and Calahorra to their sister, Princess Urraca. Sancho refuses to accept anything but an undivided kingdom as his birthright. After Alfonso instigates a knife fight, Sancho overpowers his brother and sends him to be imprisoned in Zamora. Rodrigo, who swore to protect all the king’s children, single-handedly defeats Alfonso's guards and brings the prince to Calahorra. Sancho arrives to demand Alfonso, but Urraca refuses to hand him over. Rodrigo cannot take a side in the conflict because his oath was to serve them all equally.

Ben Yusuf arrives at Valencia, the fortified city guarding the beach where he plans to land his armada. To weaken his Spanish opponents he hires Dolfos, a warrior formerly trusted by Ferdinand, to assassinate Sancho and throw suspicion for the crime on Alfonso, who becomes the sole king. At Alfonso's coronation, El Cid has him swear upon the Bible that he had no part in the death of his brother. Alfonso, genuinely innocent (although his ally Urraca was aware of the plot), is offended by the demand and banishes Rodrigo from Spain. Chimene discovers she still loves Rodrigo and voluntarily joins him in exile. Rodrigo makes his career as a soldier elsewhere in Spain, and he and Chimene have twin girls.

Years later, Rodrigo, now known widely as "El Cid", is called back into the service of the king to protect Castile from Yusuf's North African army. However, Alfonso rejects an alliance with El Cid's Muslim friends, and rather than work directly with the king, El Cid allies himself with the emirs to besiege Valencia, where the cowardly al-Kadir has violated his oath of allegiance to Rodrigo and come out in support of Ben Yusuf.

After being defeated by the Moors at the Battle of Sagrajas, Alfonso seizes Chimene and her children and puts them in prison. Count Ordóñez rescues the three and brings them to Rodrigo, wanting to end his rivalry with El Cid and join him in the defense of Spain. Knowing that the citizens of Valencia are starving after the long siege, Rodrigo wins them over by throwing bread into the city with his catapults. Al-Kadir tries to intercede, but the Valencians kill him and open the gates to the besiegers. Emir al-Mu'tamin, Rodrigo's army, and the Valencians offer the city's crown to El Cid, but he refuses and instead sends the crown to King Alfonso.

Ben Yusuf arrives with his immense invasion army, and Valencia is the only barrier between him and Spain. Ordóñez is tortured and killed after being captured on a reconnaissance mission. The ensuing battle goes well for the defenders until El Cid is struck in the chest by an arrow and has to return to the city in plain sight of the Moorish army. Doctors inform him that they can probably remove the arrow and save his life, but he will be incapacitated for a long time after the surgery. Unwilling to abandon his army at this critical moment, Rodrigo obtains a promise from Chimene to leave the arrow and let him ride back into battle, dying or dead. A guilt-ridden King Alfonso comes to his bedside and asks for his forgiveness. Rodrigo grants it, and Alfonso promises to look after Rodrigo's children.

Rodrigo dies, and a rumor of his death spreads. His allies honor Rodrigo's final wish. With help of an iron frame they prop up his body, its eyes staring straight ahead. Dressed in full armor and holding an unfurled banner, he is strapped to the back of his horse, Babieca. Guided by King Alfonso and Emir al-Mu'tamin riding on either side, the horse leads a mounted charge against Ben Yusuf's now terrified soldiers, who believe that El Cid has risen from the dead. In the panic that ensues, Ben Yusuf is thrown from his horse and is crushed beneath Babieca's hooves, leaving his scattered army to be annihilated. King Alfonso leads Christians and Moors alike in a prayer for God to receive the soul "of the purest knight of all". The film ends with El Cid's horse riding along the coast.

== Cast ==
- Charlton Heston as Don Rodrigo Díaz de Vivar, El Cid
- Sophia Loren as Chimene
- Herbert Lom as Ben Yusuf
- Raf Vallone as García Ordóñez
- Geneviève Page as Doña Urraca (sister of Alfonso VI)
- John Fraser as Alfonso VI (King of Castile)
- Douglas Wilmer as al-Mu'tamin (Emir of Zaragoza)
- Frank Thring as al-Kadir (Emir of Valencia)
- Michael Hordern as Don Diego (father of Rodrigo)
- Andrew Cruickshank as Count Gormaz (father of Chimene)
- Gary Raymond as Prince Sancho, the 1st born of King Ferdinand
- Ralph Truman as King Ferdinand
- Massimo Serato as Fañez (nephew of Rodrigo)
- Hurd Hatfield as Arias
- Tullio Carminati as Al-Jarifi
- Fausto Tozzi as Dolfos
- Christopher Rhodes as Don Martín
- Carlo Giustini as Bermúdez
- Gérard Tichy as King Ramiro
- Barbara Everest as Mother Superior
- Nelio Bernardi as Soldier
- Franco Fantasia as Soldier

== Production ==
=== Development ===
In 1955, producer Samuel Bronston entered into cooperation with the United States Navy to film the biopic John Paul Jones (1959). The country of Spain was recommended to him as a filming location by Jose Maria Areilza, then-Spanish Ambassador to the United States when they were seated together at a dinner party in Washington, D.C. Bronston agreed and established his namesake production studio near Las Rozas in Madrid. During filming, the production was allowed by the Francoist Spanish government to film sequences inside the Royal Palace of Madrid.

After John Paul Jones (1959) was completed, Bronston and director John Farrow began developing their next project, King of Kings (1961). While the project was in development, in 1958, Bronston began considering El Cid as a potential project, but it would be set aside until King of Kings reached completion. At the time, Francisco Franco had compared himself to Rodrigo Díaz de Vivar, the Cid, and Bronston readily agreed to assist the Franco government. The Spanish Ministry of Information and Tourism had initiated 'Operación Propaganda Exterior' to increase Spanish trade and tourism, to which Bronston attended frequent meetings to discuss issues of common interest.

In April 1960, Variety announced that Bronston was independently producing three films in Spain, one of which included El Cid. It was also reported that Bronston had purchased the rights to Fredric M. Frank's 140-page treatment for the film. In July 1960, Anthony Mann had signed on to direct the film. In an interview, Mann called the film "a Spanish Western".

However, principal photography was nearly delayed when Cesáreo González's Aspa Films filed an infringement claim against Bronston over the project's thematic similarities. Previously, in July 1956, it was reported that two biopics of El Cid were in development: an American-Spanish co-production with Anthony Quinn set to star, and a collaboration between RKO, Milton Sperling, and Marvin Gosch. By August 1960, Bronston reached a deal to have Aspa Films and Robert Haggiag's Dear Film involved in the production making the project an American–Italian–Spanish co-production.

=== Writing ===
The first writer assigned was Fredric M. Frank. He was flown into Spain to begin finalizing the screenplay for the initial start of shooting by July 1960. In the same month, Philip Yordan had been hired to co-write the screenplay. Yordan remarked that he had found Frank's treatment to be a "terrible script" and rewrote it. By their mid-November start date, the script had been rewritten, with Heston describing it as an improvement over the first draft.

Two days prior to the start of filming, Sophia Loren had read the latest draft and was displeased with her dialogue. She then recommended hiring blacklisted screenwriter Ben Barzman to revise it. Mann subsequently got Barzman onto a plane to Rome, after which he gave him the current screenplay draft. Barzman read the draft and found it to be unusable. Since filming was set to begin, Barzman received a copy of the seventeenth-century play Le Cid by Pierre Corneille from the library of the French embassy in Madrid and used it as the basis for a new screenplay. Years later, in 1967, Mann told Bertrand Tavernier that "not one line" in the shooting script was written by Yordan. However, Barzman's screen credit would not be added to the film until 1999.

However, Barzman's script lacked powerful romantic scenes, which again displeased Loren. Screenwriter Bernard Gordon, who was also blacklisted, was hired to rewrite these scenes. He stated: "So [Philip] Yordan yanked me from what I was doing in Paris and said, 'Write me three or four love scenes for Loren and Heston.' Well, what the hell—he was paying me $1500 a week, which was a lot more than I made any other way, and I just took orders and I sat down and I wrote four scenes, about three or four pages each. Whatever love scenes there are in the picture I wrote. And they sent them to Loren and said, OK, she'll do the picture, so I was a little bit of a hero at that point". Loren had also hired screenwriter Basilio Franchina to translate the dialogue into Italian and then back into simpler English, with which she felt comfortable.

For script advice and historical truth, Spanish historian Ramón Menéndez Pidal served as the historical consultant to the screenwriters and the director of the film. The naturalist Felix Rodriguez de la Fuente also helped to use raptors and other birds.

=== Casting ===
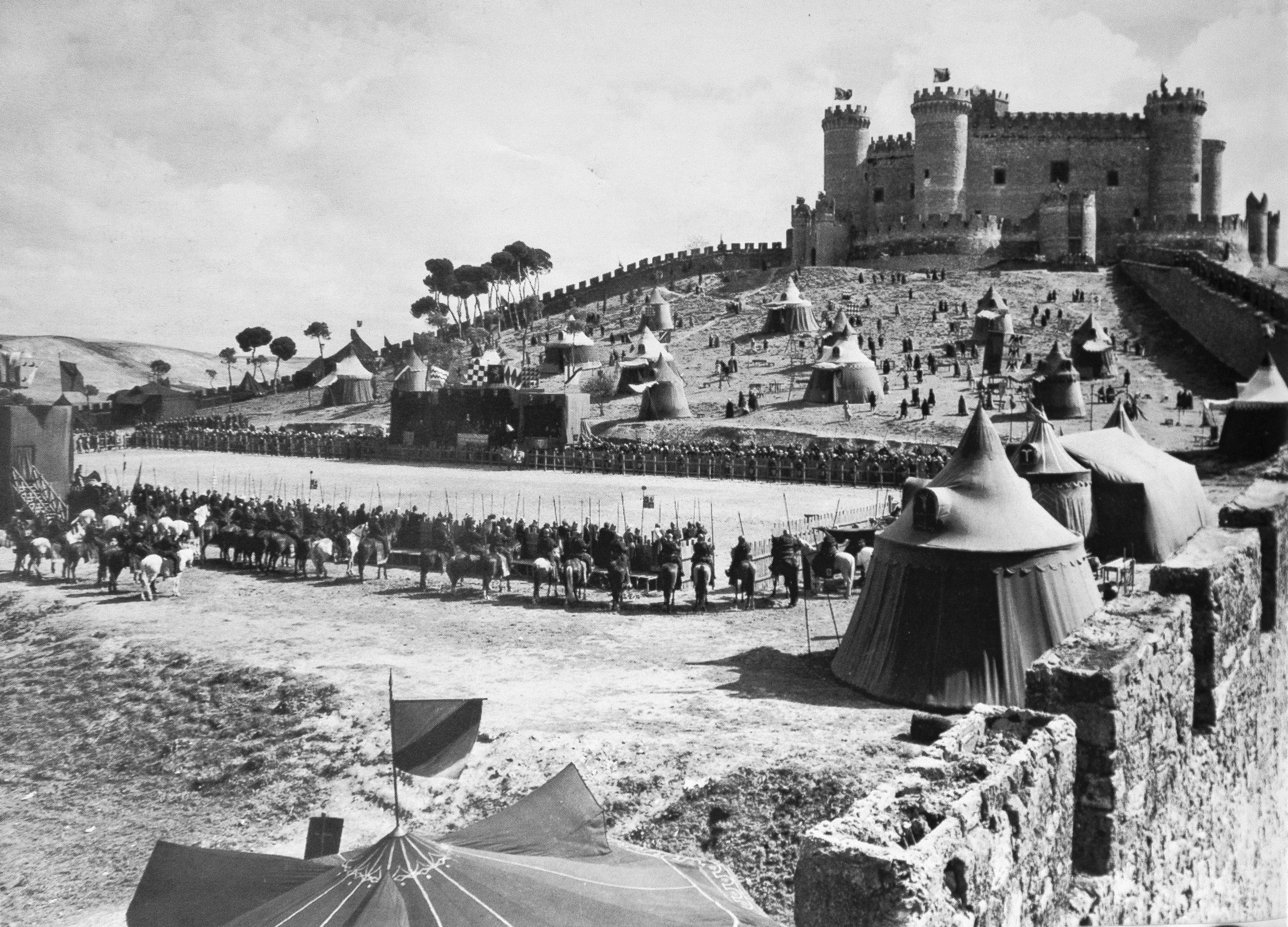
Filming near the Belmonte Castle in the province of Cuenca

Charlton Heston and Sophia Loren were Bronston's first choices for the two leads. Writing in his autobiography, in the summer of 1960, Heston had received Frank's draft which he described as not "good, ranging from minimally OK to crappy", but he was intrigued with the role. He then flew out to Madrid to meet with Bronston, Yordan, and Mann who all discussed the role with him. On July 26, 1960, his casting was announced. As he conducted research into his role, Heston read El Cantar de mio Cid and arranged a meeting with historian Ramón Menéndez Pidal. (Note: In his autobiography, Heston claimed he met with Juan Menéndez Pidal, but he had died in 1915. His brother, Ramón, was still alive in 1960 and as described was in his 90s.)

Initially, Loren was unavailable to portray Chimene, and Jeanne Moreau was briefly considered as a replacement. Another account states that Ava Gardner was approached for the role, but backed out feeling that Heston's part was bigger than hers. Mann then suggested his wife Sara Montiel, but Heston and Bronston refused. Ultimately, Loren became available but only for ten to twelve weeks, for which she was paid $1 million. This made Loren the second actress, after Elizabeth Taylor, to earn $1 million for a film. Bronston also agreed to pay $200 a week for her hairdresser.

Orson Welles was initially approached to play Ben Yusuf, but he insisted that a double do his on-set performance while he would dub in his lines during post-production. Bronston refused. British actors were primarily sought for the other male roles, for which most of the principal casting was completed by early November 1960. That same month, on November 30, Hurd Hatfield had joined the cast. At least four actresses screen-tested for the role of Doña Urraca. Geneviève Page won the part, and her casting was announced on December 16, 1960.

=== Filming ===
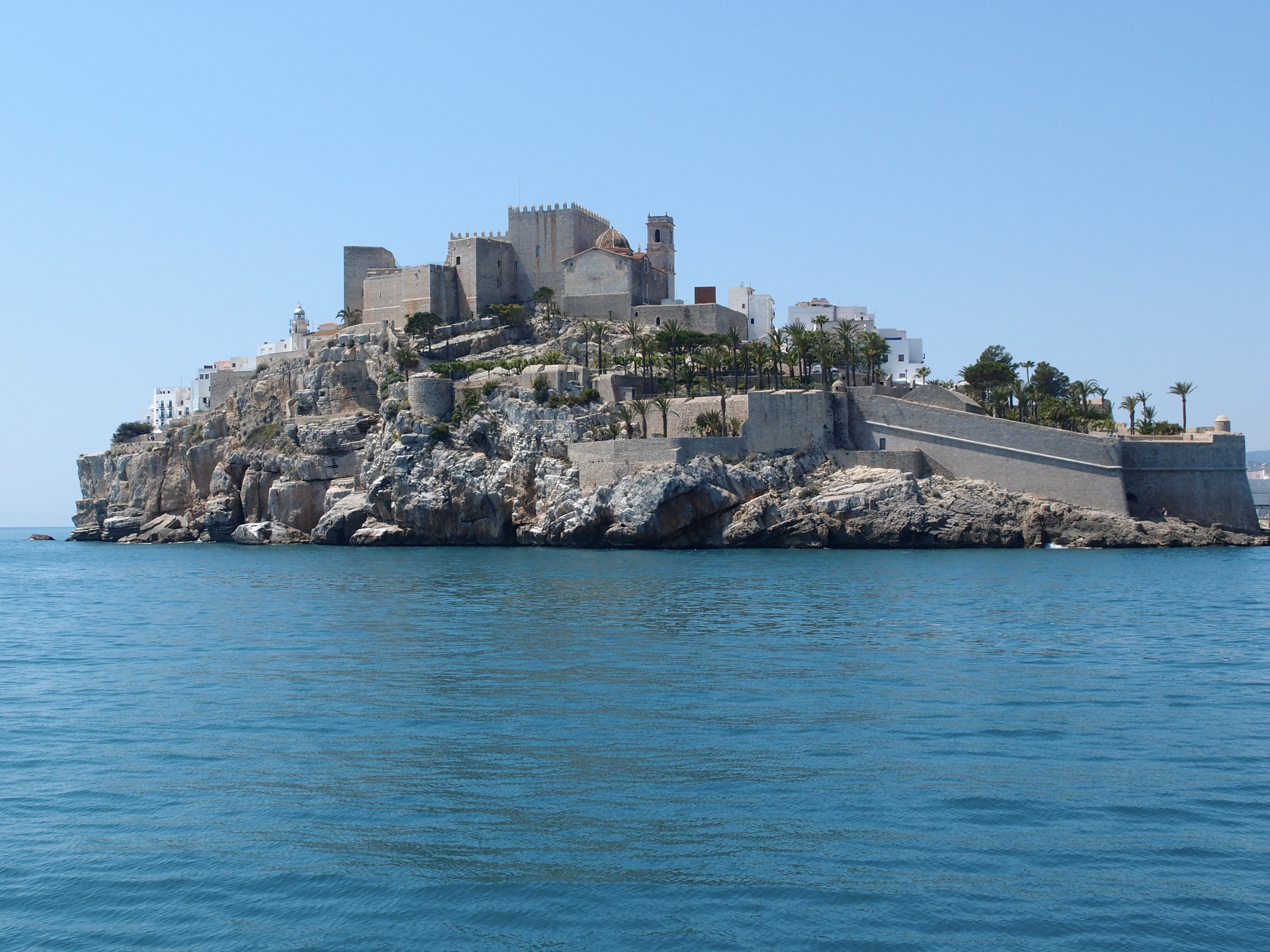
The battle of Valencia was shot on location along the beaches of Peñíscola.

Principal photography began November 14, 1960 at Sevilla Studios in Madrid, Spain. Filming was reported to spend at least four months of exterior shooting in Spain which would be followed by a final month of interior shooting at the Cinecittà Studios in Rome.

Loren's scenes were shot first, as her availability was initially for twelve weeks. Shooting lasted for eight hours a day, as the production employed French hours. By January 1961, her part was considerably expanded in response to the early dailies. Simultaneously, second-unit filming for the battle sequences was directed by Yakima Canutt. As filming had progressed, by December 1960, location shooting for action sequences was shot along the Guadarrama Pass. Specifically for the film's second half, Heston suggested growing a gray-flecked beard and wearing a facial scar to showcase Don Rodrigo's battle scarring within the ten-year gap in the story.

However, according to Heston, Loren refused to be aged with makeup for the second half of the film. He wrote: "I wish we could have persuaded Sophia to accept an aging makeup in the second half of the film... It did look odd for me to appear in the second half as the greying, scarred veteran of the Cid's weary campaigns, while Sophia was still unchanged as the beautiful Chimene".

When filming for the film's first half was nearly complete, shooting for the battle of Valencia was filmed on location in Peñíscola as the actual city had become modernized. For three months, hundreds of production design personnel constructed city walls to block off modern buildings. 1,700 trained infantrymen were leased from the Spanish Army as well as 500 mounted riders from Madrid's Municipal Honor Guard. 15 war machines and siege towers were constructed from historical artwork, and 35 boats were decorated with battlements to serve as the Moorish fleet. Tensions between Mann and Canutt rose as Mann sought to shoot the sequence himself. With the sequence nearly finished, Canutt spent three days filming pick-up shots, which would be edited within the longer, master shots that Mann had shot earlier. In his autobiography, Heston expressed his dissatisfaction with Mann's insistence on shooting the battle scenes himself, feeling Canutt was more competent and efficient.

In April 1961, the last sequence to be shot for the film—the duel for Calahorra—was filmed near the Belmonte Castle. The scene was directed by Canutt. Prior to filming, Heston and British actor Christopher Rhodes trained for a month in the use in weaponry under stunt coordinator Enzo Musumeci Greco. The fight took five days to shoot, totaling 31 hours of combat before editing. 21,000 metres (69,000 ft) of film was shot for the sequence, which was ultimately edited down to 330 metres (1,080 ft) remaining in the film.

=== Music ===
The instrumental score was written by Miklós Rózsa, who had scored Bronston's previous film King of Kings (1961). Rózsa had been assigned by Metro-Goldwyn-Mayer (MGM) to score Mutiny on the Bounty (1962) but was appalled after reading the script and backed out. Because El Cid was an Italian co-production, Mario Nascimbene, a native Italian composer, had been hired but he refused Bronston's demand to adapt Jules Massenet's opera Le Cid into the score. Bronston turned to Rózsa instead. Regardless, Italian financiers insisted Nascimbene be credited, to which Bronston asked Rózsa for his permission to have him credited on the Italian film prints. Rózsa agreed, as long as Nascimbene make no claim for royalties and his credit appeared only on the Italian prints.

After meeting with Ramón Menéndez Pidal, Rózsa began an extensive one-month study into medieval Spanish music. He took inspiration from the 12th-century musical piece titled the Cantigas de Santa Maria, compiled by Alfonso X of Castile; the Llibre Vermell, a 14th-century manuscript collection from the monastery of Montserrat, and a collection of Spanish folk songs from Felipe Pedrell. Additionally, Rózsa composed a love theme for Rodrigo and Chimene's relationship. However, Paul Francis Webster was hired to write lyrics for the theme, much to Rózsa's dislike.

Rózsa recorded a score totaling two hours and 16 minutes in Rome throughout ten days. However, more than 23 minutes of the score was removed during post-production, as the music would have superseded the film's sound effects. Rózsa appealed to have the music restored, without success. After the film's premiere, he canceled a publicity tour promoting the score.

=== Costume design ===
Costume designers Veniero Colasanti and John Moore supervised a staff of 400 wardrobe seamstresses, which spent roughly $500,000 on manufacturing medieval-style clothing at a local supply company, Casa Cornejo, near Madrid. The most expensive costume piece was a black-and-gold velvet robe worn by King Alfonso VI during the film, which was tailored in Florence, Italy from materials specially woven in Venice. In total, over 2,000 costumes were used for the film.

For the weaponry, Samuel Bronston Productions sought several local Spanish companies. Casa Cornejo provided 3,000 war helmets and hundreds of iron-studded leather jerkins. The Garrido Brothers factory, located in Toledo, Spain, worked under an exclusive contract for eight months producing 7,000 swords, scimitars, and lances. Anthony Luna, a Madrid prop manufacturer, crafted 40,000 arrows, 5,780 shields, 1,253 medieval harnesses, 800 maces and daggers, 650 suits of mail (woven from hemp and coated with a metal varnish), and 500 saddles.

== Release ==
El Cid had its world premiere at the Metropole Theatre in Victoria, London on December 6, 1961. On December 14, 1961, the film premiered at the Warner Theatre in New York City and premiered at the Carthay Circle Theatre in Los Angeles on December 18. For the film's international release, distributors included the Rank Organization releasing the film in Britain, Dear Film in Italy, Astoria Filmes in Portugal, Filmayer in Spain, and Melior in Belgium.

In August 1993, the film was re-released in theaters by Miramax Films, having undergone a digital and color restoration supervised by Martin Scorsese. The re-release added 16 minutes of restored footage back to the film's initial 172-minute running time for a total of 188 minutes.

=== Home media ===
El Cid was released on LaserDisc by The Criterion Collection on September 10, 1996. The film was presented in its original aspect ratio of 2.35:1, with a remastered soundtrack in Dolby Digital AC-3. It was accompanied by a discography of Miklós Rózsa and analysis by film historian Bruce Eder, interviews with Heston and the surviving crew members, and an original 1961 and 1993 re-release trailers.

The film was released on January 29, 2008 as a deluxe edition and a collector's edition DVD. Both DVDs included bonus materials including archival cast interviews, as well as 1961 promotional radio interviews with Loren and Heston; an audio commentary from Bill Bronston (son of Samuel Bronston) and historian Neal M. Rosendorf; a documentary on the importance of film preservation and restoration; biographical featurettes on Samuel Bronston, Anthony Mann, and Miklos Rozsa; and a "making of" documentary, "Hollywood Conquers Spain." The collector's edition DVD also included a reproduction of the premiere's souvenir program and a comic book, as well as six color production stills.

== Reception ==
=== Box office ===
By January 1963, the film had grossed $8 million in box office rentals in the United States and Canada. The film finished its box office run, earning $26.6 million in the United States and Canada. Overall, it returned $12 million in box office rentals (the distributor's share of the box office gross).

=== Critical response ===
==== Contemporary reviews ====
Bosley Crowther of The New York Times wrote "it is hard to remember a picture--not excluding Henry V, Ivanhoe, Helen of Troy and, naturally, Ben-Hur--in which scenery and regal rites and warfare have been so magnificently assembled and photographed as they are in this dazzler ... The pure graphic structure of the pictures, the imposing arrangement of the scenes, the dynamic flow of the action against strong backgrounds, all photographed with the 70mm color camera and projected on the Super-Technirama screen, give a grandeur and eloquence to this production that are worth seeing for themselves".

Robert J. Landry of Variety praised the film as "a fast-action color-rich, corpse-strewn, battle picture...The Spanish scenery is magnificent, the costumes are vivid, the chain mail and Toledo steel gear impressive." A review in Time magazine felt that "Surprisingly, the picture is good—maybe not as good as Ben-Hur, but anyway better than any spectacle since Spartacus." They also noted that "Bronston's epic has its embarrassments. El Cid himself, too, crudely contemporarized seems less the scourge of the heathen than a champion of civil rights. And there are moments when Hero Heston looks as though he needs a derrick to help him with that broadsword. Nevertheless, Anthony Mann has managed his immense material with firmness, elegance, and a sure sense of burly epic rhythm."

Harrison's Reports praised the performances from Heston and Loren and summarized the film as "raw and strong, brooding and challenging, romantic and powerfully dramatic. It is motion picture entertainment ascending new heights of pomp, pageantry, panoply." Philip K. Scheuer of the Los Angeles Times opened his review writing, "El Cid brings back the excitement of movie-making; it may even bring back the excitement of movie-going. It's as big as Ben-Hur if not bigger. If it had put a few more connectives in the narrative, if it had not thrown in an excess of everything else in three hours running time, it might have been great." A review in Newsweek described the film as being "crammed with jousts and battles, and its sound track is reminiscent of Idlewild airport on a busy day, but the dramatics in it explode with all the force of a panful of popcorn." It also derided Mann's direction as "slow, stately, and confused, while Miss Loren and Heston spend most of the picture simply glaring at each other."

==== Retrospective reviews ====
During its 1993 re-release, Martin Scorsese praised El Cid as "one of the greatest epic films ever made". James Berardinelli of Reel Views gave the film three stars out of four. In his review, he felt that "El Cid turns more often to the ridiculous than the sublime. Perhaps if the movie didn't take itself so seriously, there wouldn't be opportunities for unintentional laughter, but, from the bombastic dialogue to the stentorian score, El Cid is about as self-important as a motion picture can be. Regardless, there are still moments of breathtaking, almost transcendant splendor, when the film makers attain the grand aspirations they strive for." Richard Christiansen for the Chicago Tribune gave the film two-and-a-half stars out of four. He wrote "watching the movie today is something of a chore. Much of its celebration of heroic romanticism seems either silly, inflated or crudely flat in this non-heroic age." He also felt Heston and Loren lacked romantic chemistry.

Richard Corliss, reviewing for Time, wrote that "Like the best action films, El Cid is both turbulent and intelligent, with characters who analyze their passions as they eloquently articulate them. The Court scenes, in particular, have the complex intrigue, if not quite the poetry, of a Shakespearean history play. This richness is especially evident in the film's love story." At the film review aggregator website Rotten Tomatoes, the film has an approval rating of 93% based on 14 reviews, with an average rating of 6.9/10. On Metacritic, the film has a score of 79 based on 19 reviews, indicating "generally favorable" reviews.

In 2025, The Hollywood Reporter listed El Cid as having the best stunts of 1961.

=== Accolades ===
Award	Date of ceremony	Category	Recipients	Result
Academy Awards	April 9, 1962	Best Art Direction – Color	Veniero Colasanti and John Moore	Nominated
Academy Awards	April 9, 1962	Best Music Score of a Dramatic or Comedy Picture	Miklós Rózsa	Nominated
Academy Awards	April 9, 1962	Best Song	"Love Theme From El Cid (The Falcon and the Dove)"; Music by Miklós Rózsa; Lyrics by Paul Francis Webster	Nominated
Bambi Awards	1962	Best Actor – International	Charlton Heston	Nominated
Bambi Awards	1962	Best Actress – International	Sophia Loren	Won
British Society of Cinematographers Awards	1962	Best Cinematography in a Theatrical Feature Film	Robert Krasker	Won
Cinema Writers Circle Awards	1962	Best Foreign Film		Won
Directors Guild of America Awards	1962	Outstanding Directorial Achievement in Motion Pictures	Anthony Mann	Nominated
Golden Globe Awards	March 5, 1962	Best Motion Picture – Drama		Nominated
Golden Globe Awards	March 5, 1962	Best Director – Motion Picture	Anthony Mann	Nominated
Golden Globe Awards	March 5, 1962	Best Original Score – Motion Picture	Miklós Rózsa	Nominated
Golden Globe Awards	March 5, 1962	Special Merit Award	Samuel Bronston	Won
Golden Reel Awards	1962	Best Sound Editing – Feature Film		Won
International Film Music Critics Association Awards	2009	Best Re-Recording of an Existing Score	Miklós Rózsa, Nic Raine and Douglass Fake	Won
Laurel Awards	1962	Top Action Drama		Won
Laurel Awards	1962	Top Musical Score	Miklós Rózsa	Nominated
Laurel Awards	1962	Top Song	"Love Theme From El Cid (The Falcon and the Dove)"; Music by Miklós Rózsa; Lyrics by Paul Francis Webster	5th Place
Nastro d'Argento	1963	Best Costume Design	Veniero Colasanti	Nominated
Nastro d'Argento	1963	Best Production Design	Veniero Colasanti	Nominated
Thessaloniki Film Festival	1962	Honorary Award	Anthony Mann	Nominated

== Comic book adaptation ==
- Dell Four Color #1259 (1961)

== See also ==
- List of American films of 1961
- List of historical drama films
