= John Moore (production designer) =

American costume designer (1924–2006)

John Drake Moore (1924–2006) was an American costume designer, set decorator and production designer for films. He was nominated for the Academy Award for Best Art Direction for El Cid. Additional credits include A Farewell to Arms, 55 Days at Peking, The Fall of the Roman Empire, and A Matter of Time.

During the 1960s and 1970s, he also worked for the Salzburg Festivals where he designed the settings for Il rappresentazione die anima e di corpo, Der Rosenkavalier and Jedermann in cooperation with Veniero Colasanti.

Moore was born in Tryon, North Carolina in 1924. He died in Lugano, Switzerland in 2006.
