= Miklós Rózsa =

Hungarian-American composer (1907–1995)

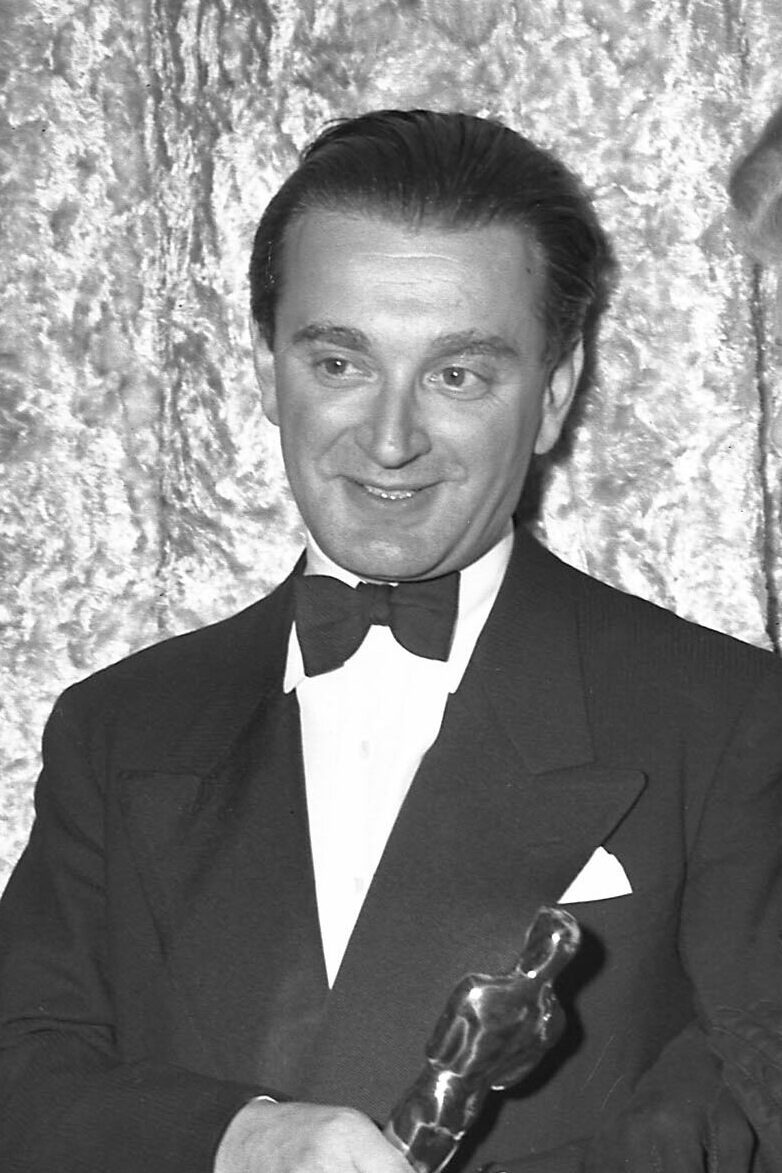
- Rózsa holding his Oscar for Spellbound at the 18th Academy Awards (1946)
- Born: April 18, 1907; Budapest, Austria-Hungary (now Hungary)
- Died: July 27, 1995 (aged 88); Los Angeles, California, U.S.
- Education: Leipzig Conservatory
- Years active: 1918–1989
- Spouse: Margaret Finlason (m. 1943)
- Children: 2
- Musical career
- Genres: Film score, contemporary classical
- Occupations: Composer, conductor
- Instruments: Piano, viola, violin
- Website: miklosrozsa.org

Miklós Rózsa (Hungarian: [ˈmikloːʃ ˈroːʒɒ]; April 18, 1907 – July 27, 1995) was a Hungarian and American composer. Best known for his nearly 100 film scores, he nevertheless maintained a steadfast allegiance to absolute concert music throughout what he called his "double life".

Rózsa achieved early success in Europe with his orchestral Theme, Variations, and Finale (Op. 13) of 1933, and became prominent in the film industry from such early scores as The Four Feathers (1939) and The Thief of Bagdad (1940). The latter project brought him to Hollywood when production was transferred from wartime Britain, and Rózsa remained in the United States, becoming an American citizen in 1946.

During his Hollywood career, he received a total of 17 Academy Award nominations, winning three times for Spellbound (1945), A Double Life (1947), and Ben-Hur (1959). He was also a César Award winner, a three-time Golden Globe nominee, and a Grammy Award nominee. His concert works were championed by such major artists as Jascha Heifetz, Gregor Piatigorsky, and János Starker.

== Early life ==
Miklós Rózsa was born in Budapest and was introduced to classical and folk music by his mother, Regina (née Berkovits), a pianist who had studied with pupils of Franz Liszt, and his father, Gyula, a well-to-do industrialist and landowner who loved Hungarian folk music. Both parents were of Jewish origin. Gyula's father, Moritz Rosenberg, had changed the family name to Rózsa in 1887. Gyula Rózsa had inherited from his father a Budapest shoe factory, which brought him to the capital around 1900. Like his father, and despite his landowning status, Gyula had liberal leanings, which he expressed in a pamphlet entitled To Whom Does the Hungarian Soil Belong? Young Miklós grew up in a home of enlightened values and musical culture. His only sibling, Edith, was born seven years later.

Rózsa's maternal uncle Lajos Berkovits, violinist with the Budapest Opera, presented young Miklós with his first instrument at the age of five. He later took up the viola and piano. By the age of eight he was performing in public and composing. He also collected folksongs from the area where his family had a country estate north of Budapest in an area inhabited by the Palóc Hungarians. While deeply admiring the folk-based nationalism of Béla Bartók and Zoltán Kodály, Rózsa sought to find his own way as a composer. Fearing that Kodály's dominance at Budapest's Franz Liszt Academy tended to suppress individualism, he sought to study music in Germany. He enrolled at the University of Leipzig in 1925, ostensibly to study chemistry at the behest of his practical-minded father. Determined to become a composer, he transferred to the Leipzig Conservatory the following year. There he studied composition with Hermann Grabner, successor to Max Reger. He attended choral performances that Karl Straube directed at the Thomaskirche, where Johann Sebastian Bach had once been the kapellmeister. Rózsa emerged from these years with a deep respect for the German musical tradition, which would always temper the Hungarian nationalism of his musical style.

Rózsa's first two published works, the String Trio, Op. 1, and the Piano Quintet, Op. 2, were issued in Leipzig by Breitkopf & Härtel. In 1929, he received his diplomas cum laude. During the Leipzig years he essayed a single-movement Violin Concerto and a lengthy Symphony, Op. 6. Neither work was published, and Rózsa was discouraged on a trip to Berlin when Wilhelm Furtwängler did not find time to consider the Symphony. Rozsa suppressed both works, but eventually allowed the Symphony (minus its lost scherzo) to be recorded in 1993.

For a time he remained in Leipzig as Grabner's assistant, but at the suggestion of the French organist and composer Marcel Dupré, he moved to Paris in 1931. There he composed chamber music and a Serenade for small orchestra, Op. 10 (later greatly revised as Hungarian Serenade, Op. 25). It was premiered in Budapest by Ernő Dohnányi, who had advised Rózsa to offer a shorter work than the Symphony. Richard Strauss was in the audience, and his approval meant more to the young composer than the presence of Habsburg royalty and the prince regent, Miklós Horthy. The subsequent Theme, Variations, and Finale, Op. 13, was especially well received and was performed by conductors such as Charles Munch, Karl Böhm, Georg Solti, Eugene Ormandy, Bruno Walter and Leonard Bernstein.

== Film scoring career ==
Rózsa was introduced to film music in 1934 by his friend, the Swiss composer Arthur Honegger. Following a concert which featured their respective compositions, Honegger mentioned that he supplemented his income as a composer of film scores, including the film Les Misérables (1934). Rózsa went to see it and was greatly impressed by the opportunities the film medium offered. However, no film scoring opportunities presented themselves in Paris, and Rózsa had to support himself by reliance on a wealthy patron and by composing light music under the pseudonym Nic Tomay. It was not until Rózsa moved to London that he was hired to compose his first film score for Knight Without Armour (1937), produced by his fellow Hungarian Alexander Korda. Around the same time he also scored Thunder in the City (1937) for another Hungarian filmmaker, Ákos Tolnay, who had previously urged Rózsa to come to England. While the latter film was the first to open, Rózsa always cited the more prestigious Korda project as his film debut. He joined the staff of Korda's London Films, and scored the studio's epic The Four Feathers (1939). Korda and the studio's music director, Muir Mathieson, brought Rózsa onto their Arabian Nights fantasy The Thief of Bagdad (1940) when the operetta-style approach of the original composer, Oscar Straus, was deemed unsuitable. Production was transferred to Hollywood when the war broke out, and Rozsa completed his score there in 1940.

The music earned him his first Academy Award nomination. While Korda remained in Hollywood, Rózsa was effectively the music director of his organization. In his capacity, he supervised the scoring of To Be or Not to Be (1942), and contributed at least one sequence of his own music. His own U.S. scores for Korda included Lydia (1940), That Hamilton Woman (1941) and The Jungle Book (1942). From the last of these emerged The Jungle Book Suite for narrator and orchestra, which became popular as narrated by the film's star, Sabu, and was soon recorded in New York by RCA. The 78-rpm album became the first substantial recording of Hollywood film music. It was later recorded with Rózsa conducting the Frankenland State Orchestra of Nuremberg and Leo Genn as narrator.

In 1943, now associated with Paramount, Rózsa scored the first of several collaborations with director Billy Wilder, Five Graves to Cairo. That same year he also scored the similarly themed Humphrey Bogart film Sahara. In 1944, his scores for a second Wilder collaboration, Double Indemnity, and for The Woman of the Town, both received Academy Award nominations.

In 1944, Rózsa was hired by producer David O. Selznick to compose the score for Alfred Hitchcock's film Spellbound. The scoring process was contentious, with producer, director and composer all expressing considerable dissatisfaction with each other. Numerous changes were made in the editing by Audray Granville, Selznick's assistant and de facto music director. The almost farcical history of artists at cross-purposes has been documented by Jack Sullivan (Hitchcock's Music, 2006) and especially Nathan Platte (Making Music in Selznick's Hollywood, 2018). Nevertheless, the film was a hit after its release in late 1945. The combination of lush melody for the romance and frenzied expressionism for the suspense scenes proved irresistible. Rózsa's pioneering (for Hollywood) use of the theremin contributed to the effect, and the attention it generated likely influenced his Academy Award nomination. Two of his other 1945 scores were also nominated, The Lost Weekend and A Song to Remember, but the Oscar was awarded to Spellbound. Although Selznick was unhappy with the score, his innovative radio promotion of the music contributed to both the film's and the composer's success. Rózsa eventually arranged his themes as the Spellbound Concerto, which (in multiple versions) has enjoyed lasting success in concerts and recordings. The composer Jerry Goldsmith cited Spellbound as a key influence in his decision to seek a career in film music.

Rózsa enjoyed a fruitful three-film collaboration with the independent producer Mark Hellinger. For The Killers (1946) he wrote an ominous rhythmic figure that later became famous as the "dum-da-dum-dum" signature theme of the radio and television program Dragnet. A lawsuit eventually resulted in shared credit for Rózsa and the Dragnet composer, Walter Schumann. The affair is documented in Jon Burlingame's TV's Biggest Hits (1996). The prison drama Brute Force followed in 1947. On The Naked City (1948), Hellinger, on the day before he died, asked Rózsa to replace another composer's music. Rózsa later compiled a six-movement suite of music from these three films in tribute to the producer. The Mark Hellinger Suite was later recorded as Background to Violence.

Rózsa received his second Oscar for A Double Life (1947), in which Ronald Colman, as a Shakespearean actor playing Othello, becomes murderously disturbed in his offstage life. Rózsa later adopted the title for his own memoir, signifying his desire to keep his personal music distinct from his movie career. That same year Rózsa and Eugene Zador arranged music by Nikolai Rimsky-Korsakov for the film Song of Scheherazade, about a fictional episode in the composer's early life. Zador, a fellow Hungarian immigrant and a noted composer in his own right, assisted with the orchestration of most of Rózsa's Hollywood film music. Also in 1947, Rózsa scored the music for the psychological thriller The Red House.

In 1948 Rózsa signed his only long-term studio contract with Metro-Goldwyn-Mayer (Double Life, p. 159). Previous associations with Paramount and Universal had been on a picture-to-picture basis. He was able to stipulate time off for his "serious" or personal composing, the right to decline assignments, and the right to teach a course on film music at the University of Southern California. The M-G-M affiliation, which lasted until 1962, resulted in new musical approaches for the studio's output of historical romances and biblical "epics." Quo Vadis (1951) initiated the composer's historical period. For this massive production, Hollywood's most expensive film to that date, Rózsa went back to ancient Greek sources in an effort to simulate the music of antiquity. His account of this research was published in Film Music Notes 11:2 (1951) and has been reprinted frequently since. Other historical pictures from this era were set in Antiquity: Julius Caesar (1953), Ben-Hur (1959), King of Kings and El Cid, both (1961); in the Middle Ages: Ivanhoe (1952) and Knights of the Round Table (1953); in the Renaissance: Young Bess (1953) and Diane (1956); and in the nineteenth century: Madame Bovary (1949) and Lust for Life (1956).

Ben-Hur, widely considered Rózsa's cinemusical masterpiece, is one of the longest film scores ever composed. Its intricate Wagnerian web of leitmotifs has received extensive study. Roger Hickman describes it as "the last universally acknowledged score created in the classical Hollywood tradition prior to Star Wars (1977)... and one of the most influential scores on the Star Wars generation." The film was Hollywood's greatest success since Gone with the Wind, and Rózsa's Academy Award was one of its record total of eleven. The "Parade of the Charioteers" became popular with bands across the country.

In 1968, he was asked to score The Green Berets, after Elmer Bernstein turned it down due to his political beliefs. Rózsa initially declined the offer, saying, "I don't do westerns." However, he agreed to compose the score after being informed, "It's not a Western, it's an 'Eastern'." He produced a strong and varied score, which included a nightclub vocal by a Vietnamese singer, Bạch Yến. However, one cue which incorporated stanzas of "Onward, Christian Soldiers", was deleted from the film's final edit.

His popular film scores during the 1970s included his last two Billy Wilder collaborations The Private Life of Sherlock Holmes (1970) and Fedora (1978), the Ray Harryhausen fantasy sequel The Golden Voyage of Sinbad (1973), the latter-day film noir Last Embrace starring Roy Scheider and the time-travel fantasy film Time After Time (1979), for which Rózsa won a Science Fiction Film Award. In his televised acceptance speech, Rózsa said that, of all the film scores he had ever composed, it was the one he had worked on the hardest.

For his first film in English, Providence (1977), Alain Resnais turned to Rózsa, whom he had admired especially for his work on the 1949 version of Madame Bovary. Rózsa later cited Resnais as one of the few directors in his experience who really understood the function of music in film.

After completing work on the music for the spy thriller Eye of the Needle (1981), Rózsa's last film score was for the black-and-white Steve Martin film Dead Men Don't Wear Plaid (1982), a comic homage to the film noir films of the 1940s, a genre to which Rozsa himself had contributed scores. Although Rózsa's career as a composer for films ended following a stroke he suffered while on holiday in Italy later that year, he continued to compose various concert pieces thereafter; one of his last works being Sonata for Ondes Martenot, op. 45 (1989).

He returned to California at the behest of his son, and remained sequestered at his home for the remainder of his life.

== Death ==
Rózsa died on July 27, 1995 of pneumonia following a stroke, at the age of 88. His wife, Margaret, died in 1999, aged 89.

== Works ==
Rózsa's first major success was the orchestral Theme, Variations, and Finale, Op. 13, introduced in Duisburg, Germany, in 1934 and soon taken up by Charles Munch, Karl Böhm, Bruno Walter, Hans Swarowsky, and other leading conductors. It was first played in the United States by the Chicago Symphony Orchestra under Hans Lange on October 28–29, 1937, and achieved wide exposure through a 1943 New York Philharmonic concert broadcast when Leonard Bernstein made his famous conducting debut.

By 1952, his film score work was proving so successful that he was able to negotiate a clause in his contract with MGM that gave him three months each year away from the film studio so that he could focus on concert music.

Rózsa's Violin Concerto, Op. 24, was composed in 1953–54 for the violinist Jascha Heifetz, who collaborated with the composer in fine-tuning it. Rózsa later adapted portions of this work for the score of Billy Wilder's The Private Life of Sherlock Holmes (1970). Rózsa's Cello Concerto, Op. 32 was written much later (1967–68) at the request of the cellist János Starker, who premiered the work in Berlin in 1969.

Between his violin and cello concertos, Rózsa composed his Sinfonia Concertante, Op. 29, for violin, cello, and orchestra. The commissioning artists, Heifetz and his frequent collaborator Gregor Piatigorsky, never performed the finished work, although they did record a reduced version of the slow movement, called Tema con Variazoni, Op. 29a.

Rózsa also received recognition for his choral works. His collaboration with conductor Maurice Skones and The Choir of the West at Pacific Lutheran University in Tacoma, Washington, resulted in a commercial recording of his sacred choral works—To Everything There is a Season, Op. 20; The Vanities of Life, Op. 30; and The Twenty-Third Psalm, Op. 34—produced by John Steven Lasher and recorded by Allen Giles for the Entr'acte Recording Society in 1978.

=== Written bibliography ===
- Miklós Rózsa: "Quo Vadis?" Film Music Notes, Vol. 11, No. 2 (1951)
- Miklós Rózsa: Double Life: The Autobiography of Miklós Rózsa, Composer in the Golden Years of Hollywood, Seven Hills Books (1989) – ISBN 0-85936-209-4
- Miklós Rózsa: Double Life: The Autobiography of Miklós Rózsa, Composer in the Golden Years of Hollywood, The Baton Press (1984) – ISBN 0-85936-141-1 (Softcover edition)
- Miklós Rózsa: Életem történeteiből (Discussions with János Sebestyén, edited by György Lehotay-Horváth). Zeneműkiadó, Budapest (1980) – ISBN 963-330-354-0

== In popular culture ==
The seventh variation (after the theme) of his Theme, Variations and Finale, Op. 13, was used as part of the soundtrack in four episodes—most notably "The Clown Who Cried"—of 1950s television series Adventures of Superman.

In the Tom Clancy novel Red Rabbit, a fictional cousin of Rózsa's, "Jozsef Rozsa", appears as a minor character who is famous in-universe as a conductor of classical music.

== Awards and nominations ==
Institution	Year	Category	Work	Result	Ref.
Academy Awards	1941	Best Original Score	The Thief of Bagdad	Nominated	
Academy Awards	1942	Best Original Score	Sundown	Nominated	
Academy Awards	1942	Best Original Score	Lydia	Nominated	
Academy Awards	1943	Best Original Score	The Jungle Book	Nominated	
Academy Awards	1945	Best Original Score	The Woman of the Town	Nominated	
Academy Awards	1945	Best Original Score	Double Indemnity	Nominated	
Academy Awards	1946	Best Original Score	A Song to Remember	Nominated	
Academy Awards	1946	Best Original Score	The Lost Weekend	Nominated	
Academy Awards	1946	Best Original Score	Spellbound	Won	
Academy Awards	1947	Best Original Score	The Killers	Nominated	
Academy Awards	1948	Best Original Score	A Double Life	Won	
Academy Awards	1952	Best Original Score	Quo Vadis	Nominated	
Academy Awards	1953	Best Original Score	Ivanhoe	Nominated	
Academy Awards	1954	Best Original Score	Julius Caesar	Nominated	
Academy Awards	1960	Best Original Score	Ben-Hur	Won	
Academy Awards	1962	Best Original Score	El Cid	Nominated	
Academy Awards	1962	Best Original Song	El Cid ("Love Theme from El Cid (The Falcon and the Dove)")	Nominated	
ASCAP Awards	1987	Golden Soundtrack Award	—N/a	Won	
César Awards	1978	Best Original Music	Providence	Won	
Golden Globes	1953	Best Original Score	Ivanhoe	Nominated	
Golden Globes	1962	Best Original Score	King of Kings	Nominated	
Golden Globes	1962	Best Original Score	El Cid	Nominated	
Grammy Awards	1961	Best Score Soundtrack for Visual Media	Ben-Hur	Nominated	
London Film Critics' Circle	1989	Special Achievement Award	—N/a	Won	
Saturn Awards	1976	Lifetime Achievement Award	—N/a	Won	
Saturn Awards	1980	Best Music	Time After Time	Won	
