= Loew's State Theatre (New York City) =

Theater in Manhattan, New York (1921–1987)

Coordinates: 40.757815°N 73.984877°W

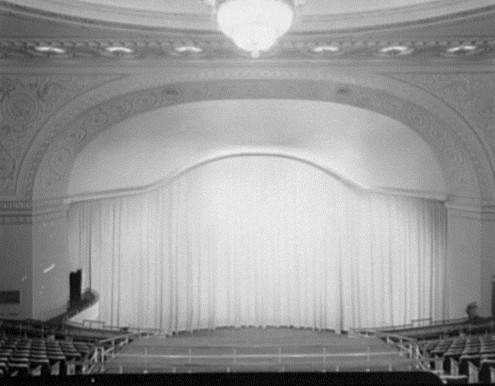
Photo of the theatre's interior in 1959

The Loew's State Theatre was a movie theater at 1540 Broadway in Times Square in New York City. Designed by Thomas Lamb in the Adam style, it opened on August 29, 1921, as part of a 16-story office building for the Loew's Theatres company, with a seating capacity of 3,200 and featuring both vaudeville and films. It was the first theater on Broadway to cost $1 million. It was initially managed by Joseph Vogel, who later became president of Loew's Inc. and then MGM.

For several years it was a second-run theater featuring live acts and a feature (most often an MGM film that would have premiered at the Astor Theatre before having its initial run at the Capitol, both Loew's movie houses located just a few blocks from the State), although it also had frequent personal appearances and short subjects.

Loew's became the last theater in Times Square to continue booking vaudeville acts as that medium declined in the 1930s; when it hosted its last vaudeville show on December 23, 1947, sentimental goodbyes were made from the stage in recognition of the end of an era.

A young Herbert Khaury, later known as Tiny Tim, worked at the theater as a messenger boy from March 1951 to August 1952.

In March 1959 the theater completed an $850,000 remodeling that reduced the number of seats from 3,316 to 1,885 but made them wider and increased the space between rows. The proscenium arch also was eliminated and a wide-screen projector was installed to permit the showing of CinemaScope and VistaVision (but not Cinerama) motion pictures. The interior was redecorated using a beige-on-gold palette. The remodeled theater reopened with the New York premiere of Some Like It Hot, with Marilyn Monroe in attendance.

The theater held several world premieres including The Three Musketeers (1948), Annie Get Your Gun (1950), Ben-Hur (1959), Becket (1964), and Doctor Dolittle (1967).

The cinema was split into two in 1968 with the former balcony re-opening on December 18, 1968, as the State II with 1,214 seats with the U.S. premiere of Chitty Chitty Bang Bang. The orchestra was renamed State I with 1,172 seats. In March 1972, State I held the world premiere of The Godfather, which also opened the following day at State II. The theater was sold to developer Bruce Eichner in 1986. It closed on February 19, 1987, and was replaced by the Bertelsmann Building.
