= The Fall of the Roman Empire (film) =

1964 film by Anthony Mann

- Original theatrical release poster by Renato Fratini
- Directed by: Anthony Mann
- Written by: Ben Barzman; Basilio Franchina; Philip Yordan
- Produced by: Samuel Bronston
- Starring: Sophia Loren; Stephen Boyd; Alec Guinness; James Mason; Christopher Plummer; John Ireland; Mel Ferrer; Omar Sharif; Anthony Quayle
- Cinematography: Robert Krasker
- Edited by: Robert Lawrence
- Music by: Dimitri Tiomkin
- Production company: Samuel Bronston Productions
- Distributed by: Paramount Pictures
- Release dates: March 24, 1964 (UK); March 26, 1964 (US)
- Running time: 185 minutes
- Country: United States
- Language: English
- Budget: $16 million
- Box office: $4.8 million (US)

The Fall of the Roman Empire is a 1964 American epic historical drama film directed by Anthony Mann and produced by Samuel Bronston, with a screenplay by Ben Barzman, Basilio Franchina and Philip Yordan. The film stars Sophia Loren, Stephen Boyd, Alec Guinness, James Mason, Christopher Plummer, Mel Ferrer and Omar Sharif.

When the filming of El Cid (1961) had finished, Anthony Mann saw a copy of Edward Gibbon's 1776–1789 six-volume series The History of the Decline and Fall of the Roman Empire inside Hatchards bookshop. He pitched a film adaptation of the book to Samuel Bronston, who then agreed to produce the project. Philip Yordan was enlisted to write the script while Charlton Heston was initially set to star. Heston backed out of the film and agreed to star in 55 Days at Peking (1963). The final screenplay was written by Ben Barzman and Basilio Franchina with a prologue written by historian Will Durant. Filming began in January 1963 and wrapped in July. The film featured the largest outdoor set in the history of film at that time, a 92,000 m^{2} (990,000 sq ft) replica of the Roman Forum.

On March 24, 1964, the film premiered at the London Astoria. Critics found the script lacking in emotion and humanity and the direction misguided, but accorded a degree of praise for the large spectacles. The film was a financial failure at the box office, earning $4.8 million on a budget of $16 million.

== Plot ==
In the winter of 180 AD, the ailing Roman emperor Marcus Aurelius fights to keep Germanic tribes from invading his northern territories on the Danube frontier. His deputies are the Greek ex-slave Timonides and the stern and honest general Gaius Livius. Privately Aurelius holds egalitarian ideals, and wants a successor who will reform the empire and grant equal rights to all its subjects; this disqualifies his son Commodus, who prefers to rule by force. Instead, Aurelius decides to nominate Livius, Commodus's closest friend and the lover of the emperor's daughter Lucilla.

Before Aurelius can announce his plan, he is poisoned by Commodus's crony Cleander, who with his allies hope to secure their own political future by ensuring Commodus' ascension. Feeling that a plebeian such as himself would never be accepted as emperor without Aurelius's explicit backing, Livius lets his old friend take the position instead. Commodus is not part of the murder plot, but nonetheless hates his father for trying to deny him the throne. He dedicates himself to undoing all of Aurelius's policies of equality, and to extracting heavy taxes from the provinces to enrich the city of Rome.

Meanwhile, Livius's army defeats the Germans on the frontier. Among the captives are the chieftain Ballomar and his court. Timonides and Lucilla convince Livius to advocate for mercy towards the conquered barbarians, thus perpetuating the legacy of Aurelius. Timonides wins the Germans' trust by successfully undergoing an ordeal, having his hand held in the flame of a torch without crying out, and they agree to submit to the judgement of the Roman Senate. Despite hostility from Commodus, speeches by Livius and Timonides persuade the senators to let the German captives become peaceful farmers on Italian land, thereby encouraging their fellow barbarians to cooperate with Rome instead of fighting it. Thwarted, Commodus sends Livius back to the northern frontier and Lucilla to Armenia, with whose king, Sohaemus, she shares a loveless political marriage.

Lucilla joins a revolt in Rome's eastern provinces, where a famine has been exacerbated by the new taxes. Commodus sends his northern army against the rebels, knowing that Livius will put aside personal feelings and fight to preserve the unity of the Empire. As the opposing Roman armies meet for battle, Sohaemus arrives and attacks Livius with both the Armenian army and troops borrowed from Rome's archenemy, the Persians. The rebels patriotically decide to fight Persia instead of Rome, joining with Livius and helping him to vanquish Sohaemus. As a reward Commodus declares Livius his co-emperor, but only on condition that the northern army inflicts harsh punishments on the rebellious provinces.

Rejecting this piece of brutality, Livius and Lucilla take their army to Rome, intending to make Commodus abdicate. The emperor responds by bribing away the soldiers' loyalty and massacring Timonides and the population of the German colony. Lucilla tries to hire Verulus, Commodus's gladiator bodyguard, to assassinate her brother; Verulus declines, confessing that he slept with Aurelius's wife and that Commodus is his illegitimate son.

The Senate declares Commodus a god, and Livius and Lucilla are sentenced to be burned alive as human sacrifices to the new deity as the Roman citizens drunkenly celebrate. In consideration of their former friendship, Commodus offers Livius a duel for the throne. The two fight with javelins in the Roman Forum, where Livius eventually runs Commodus through. At last Livius is free to become emperor, but he has lost faith in Rome's ability to reform. He departs the city with Lucilla, as Commodus's old advisers fight over the throne and offer competing bribes to the army in an attempt to gain military support.

A voice-over epilogue states that though the Roman Empire did not fall immediately, internal corruption led to its eventual collapse.

== Cast ==
- Sophia Loren as Lucilla
- Stephen Boyd as Livius
- Alec Guinness as Marcus Aurelius
- James Mason as Timonides
- Christopher Plummer as Commodus
- Mel Ferrer as Cleander
- Omar Sharif as Sohaemus, King of Armenia
- Anthony Quayle as Verulus
- John Ireland as Ballomar
- Eric Porter as Julianus
- Finlay Currie as Senator
- Andrew Keir as Polybius
- Douglas Wilmer as Pescennius Niger
- George Murcell as Victorinus
- Norman Wooland as Virgilianus

== Production ==
=== Development ===
The idea for The Fall of the Roman Empire originated with Anthony Mann who had just finished directing El Cid (1961). In London, while waiting for a taxi cab, he spotted an Oxford concise edition of Edward Gibbon's six-volume series The History of the Decline and Fall of the Roman Empire near the front window at the Hatchards bookshop. Mann never read the entire edition but he pitched an adaptation having "no idea what the story was going to be". Samuel Bronston, who had wanted Mann to direct another epic for him, allowed Mann to further develop his idea. In July 1961, Bronston told The New York Times that The Fall of the Roman Empire would be his next project, but he had also ruled out filming on location in Rome. He stated that upon "checking I found the Eternal City was not the 'city' of the time of the fall of the empire, so we'll build our 'Rome' in Madrid." Additionally, Philip Yordan had been tasked to write the script while Charlton Heston was being offered the role of Marcus Aurelius.

In September 1961, Bronston formally announced he was planning a trilogy of historical spectacles in Spain, which included The Fall of the Roman Empire with Mann and Heston returning to direct and star in. Filming was initially set in February 1962, with the production design for the recreated Roman Forum supervised by Veniero Colasanti and John Moore. Months later, by December 1961, Heston had disliked Yordan's script for the film. At the premiere of El Cid (1961), in Madrid, Heston told Bronston associate Michael Waszynski that he was not interested in The Fall of the Roman Empire. On the next day, during a jet flight back to Los Angeles, Yordan, who was seated next to Heston, and director Nicholas Ray pitched 55 Days at Peking (1963) to him. Subsequently, 55 Days at Peking went into production while Roman Empire was placed on hold. The elaborate sets for Roman Empire were then pulled down and replaced with the Forbidden City sets for 55 Days at Peking.

=== Writing ===
"[A]ll we were trying to do was dramatize how an empire fell. Incest, buying an army, destroying the will of the people to speak through the senate, all these things, I can name 'em all, were in the film. And these were the seeds that led us to say at the end: 'This is the beginning'; we didn't say: 'This was the fall.' And they pounced on that and said that that was pompous for me to have said—well, it would've been pompous of me, if I hadn't said it. But you can't argue with these bums. They think they know it all."

— Anthony Mann, justifying the film's title

In April 1963, Mann explained to the Los Angeles Times that while the film was not a direct adaptation of Gibbon's volume series, the focus on a fifteen-year period from Marcus Aurelius's reign to Commodus's death was backed by historians as "the turning point in the history of the empire and by concentrating our story on it we can keep the same group of characters within the range of our drama." Having selected a focal point for the film, screenwriter Basilio Franchina was hired for his broad knowledge of the period while Ben Barzman would handle the actual writing of the script. Together, they subsequently wrote a 350-page film treatment.

After this, Mann consulted with the screenwriters on further developing the characters, in which they wrote six drafts in total. The sixth draft was developed during filming. Mann later explained, "The writing took us more than one year. We did not have artists in mind when we were writing; but we wanted characters with memorable scenes to attract artists of the calibre of Guinness to want to play them."

As the script was being written, the Roman Forum was constructed on Bronston's studio backlot although their script had made no mention of it. Under Yordan's supervision, the action was re-written for scenes they had not written for the Forum to occur there, which brought much dismay from Barzman. In January 1963, it was reported that historian Will Durant had written a prologue for the film.

=== Casting ===
It was envisioned that Heston was cast as Livius, but he turned it down. The part had also been offered to Kirk Douglas, who turned it down as well following an offer of $1.5 million. In 1971, he later said he regretted this "because with $1.5 million there are lots of things you can do that you want to." In May 1962, it was announced that Stephen Boyd, who had played opposite to Heston in Ben-Hur (1959), was cast as the lead opposite Gina Lollobrigida as Lucilla. In September 1962, it was announced that Sophia Loren had been cast as Lucilla, in which she was paid $1 million.

In August 1962, it was reported that Alec Guinness had been cast as Marcus Aurelius, while Richard Harris, Albert Finney, John Gielgud and Terence Stamp were being considered for other roles. Later that same month, it was reported that Harris had been cast as Commodus. However, in January 1963, he was replaced by Christopher Plummer who had pulled out of The V.I.P.s (1963) to do so. Harris later portrayed the role of Marcus Aurelius in the similarly themed 2000 film Gladiator. By the time filming was set to begin, Anthony Quayle, Omar Sharif, John Ireland and Mel Ferrer had been cast in supporting roles.

=== Filming ===
Principal photography began on January 14, 1963. Marcus Aurelius's winter camp on the Danube was shot on location in the snow along the Sierra de Guadarrama in northern Madrid. By the next month, filming in the area was suspended due to a severe blizzard. The battle sequence between the Romans and Persians involved 8,000 extras, and was shot on an undulating plain near Manzanares el Real, which allowed for legions of soldiers to be visible over a long distance.

Meanwhile, Yakima Canutt was hired as the second unit director at the insistence of Mann. As previously done in El Cid (1961), Canutt performed his own stunts while his son Tap served as the stunt double for Stephen Boyd. Jack Williams served as the body double for Christopher Plummer. Among the first scenes shot was the chariot race sequence between Livius and Commodus. Canutt was also tasked to gather 1,500 horses from Spain and Portugal, for which they were trained to fall safely during the battle sequences.

Interior scenes were shot in Madrid at the Samuel Bronston Studios (formerly known as the Chamartín Studios) and at the Cinecittà studios in Rome where Commodus's baths and gymnasiums were constructed. Filming had been arranged to shoot at Cinecittà in order to make it eligible for government subsidies. In July 1963, filming was finished after 143 days. Second unit directors Canutt and Andrew Marton spent an additional 63 days shooting the action sequences.

=== Production design ===
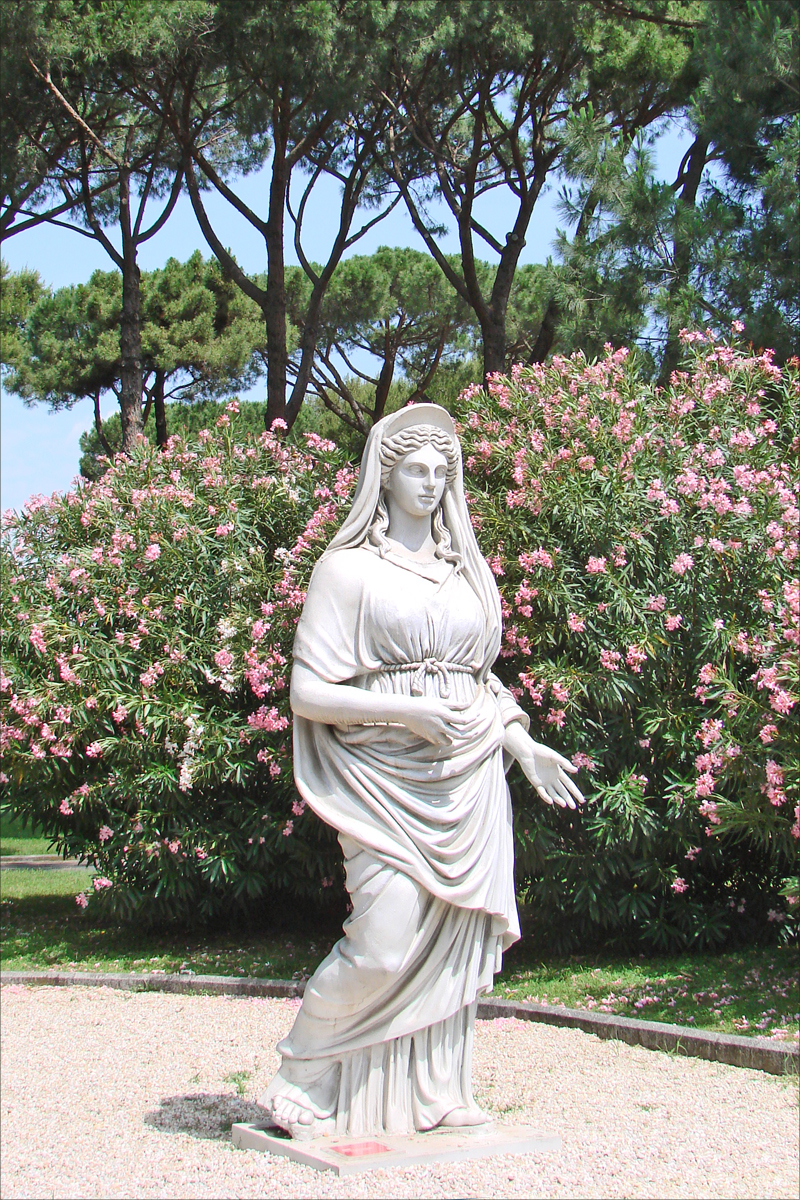
A statue of Juno as seen in the movie, displayed at the Cinecittà studios in Rome, Italy

Veniero Colasanti and John Moore served as the art directors overseeing the production design with the guidance of Will Durant. Actual construction began on October 1, 1962, using 1,100 men who labored for seven months. About 400 art students and craftsmen throughout Spain worked on the statuary, tiles, frescoes and details of the set. The film's reconstruction of the Roman Forum was constructed in Las Matas near Madrid, approximately 25 kilometers (16 mi) from Bronston's studio. The entire set was measured at 400 by 230 meters (1,310 ft × 750 ft), which holds the record for the largest outdoor film set. Uniquely for the film, the set was not extended through the use of matte paintings.

The Temple of Jupiter was constructed on a 29-meter-high (95 ft) hill along the plains of Las Matas by which craftsmen built the 50-meter (160 ft) temple on it. The bronze equestrian figures at the top of the temple were 24 meters (79 ft) above the pavement of the forum set. For the statuary, 350 statues had to be constructed. There were 76 life-size statues, more than a thousand sculpted bases for the remaining figures and victory columns, and a series of the aforementioned equestrian statues that were 7.6 meters (25 ft) high. Ultimately, more than 3,000 sketches were drawn to illustrate the 27 structures that would comprise the sets. The various ancient Rome settings covered 22 hectares (54 acres). After much of the set was pulled down, the remaining sections were reused in A Funny Thing Happened on the Way to the Forum (1966).

== Music ==
Dimitri Tiomkin's score, which is one of the notable features of the film, is more than 150 minutes in length. It is scored for a large orchestra, including an important part for cathedral organ. Several cues are extended compositions in their own right. These include Pax Romana in which Marcus Aurelius summons the governors of all the Roman provinces. Although Christopher Palmer stated in his book on film music, The Composer in Hollywood, that it was a march, the cue is actually in the style of a bolero.

Other notable cues include those for The Roman Forum, composed to accompany Commodus's triumphal return to Rome as the newly installed Emperor; a percussive scherzo for a barbarian attack by Ballomar's army; the Tarantella danced by the Roman mob on the evening presaging the gladiatorial combat between Livius and Commodus (which seems to be modelled on the Tarantella movement from the Piano Concerto of Tiomkin's teacher Ferruccio Busoni).

The music was recorded at the Royal Albert Hall. The music editor was George Korngold, son of Erich Wolfgang Korngold. A soundtrack album was released by Columbia Records to coincide with the release of the film.

The Fall of the Roman Empire: Limited Edition
No.	Title	Length
1.	"Fanfares and Flourishes"	0:53
2.	"Overture"	2:45
3.	"The Fall of Love"	2:37
4.	"Lucilla's Sorrow"	1:49
5.	"Ballomar's Barbarian Attack"	1:42
6.	"Morning"	1:08
7.	"Profundo"	2:38
8.	"Notturno"	2:03
9.	"Pax Romana (Bolero)"	5:20
10.	"The Prophecy"	1:10
11.	"Persian Battle"	2:06
12.	"Dawn of Love"	2:23
13.	"The Roman Forum"	4:51
14.	"By Jove ("Triumph and End of Part 1")"	0:41
15.	"Intermezzo: Livius and Lucilla ("The Fall of Love Intermission")"	2:21
16.	"Addio"	1:58
17.	"Tarantella"	2:20
18.	"Resurrection"	2:56
19.	"The Fall of Rome"	2:14
20.	"Dawn on the Northern Frontier ("Aurelius Awaits Dawn")"	2:18
21.	"Arrival of Livius"	1:03
22.	"Old Acquaintances "Lucilla and Livius""	4:33
23.	"Decoy Patrol ("The Signal to March")"	1:00
24.	"Battle in the Forest/Reinforcements ("Barbarian Ambush 1 & 2")"	3:51
25.	"Conflict in the Caverns ("Ballomar's Barbarian Attack Part 2")"	1:47
26.	"Passing the Torch"	2:30
27.	"The Army Enters Rome/ The New God/The Challenge ("Commodus Deified")"	4:04

== Release ==
Prior to the film's release, columnist Hedda Hopper predicted in the Los Angeles Times that "this beautiful, honest, superbly done film will make millions." The film had its world premiere screening at the London Astoria on March 24, 1964, and ran there for 70 weeks. Two days later, the film premiered at the DeMille Theater in New York City. In April 1964 the film was screened, although out of competition, at the 1964 Cannes Film Festival. Sophia Loren was a guest, appearing at the Cannes premiere on a chariot.

The film had been shot in Ultra Panavision 70 with a 2.76:1 aspect ratio, although it was never screened in that format. Instead, it was screened with a 2.20:1 aspect ratio for 70 mm roadshow presentations, and subsequently in 35 mm at 2.35:1 during the film's general release. The film's original running time had totaled 185 minutes including an overture, intermission and exit music. However, for the film's general release, the film was reduced by half an hour.

=== Novelization ===
In conjunction with the film's release, a paperback novelization also titled The Fall of the Roman Empire was published by Fawcett Publications. The novelization was written by Harry Whittington and was based on the film's screenplay. The cover of the novel is a screenshot from the film. The text of the novel provides a more detailed exposition of the film's plot line. Other covers that were not screenshots of the film were used for this novel of the film.

=== Home media ===
The film was first released on LaserDisc in a letterboxed format during the 1990s. The most complete version of the film was released on Super 8 mm in the early 1990s, extracted from a 16 mm print.

On April 29, 2008, the film was released on a three-disc limited collector's edition DVD as part of the Miriam Collection by the Weinstein Company. This edition included bonus materials including an audio commentary by Bill Bronston (son of producer Samuel Bronston) and biographer Mel Martin; a reproduction of the original 1964 souvenir program; a behind-the-scenes look at the fall of the real Roman Empire; a "making of" documentary; five Encyclopædia Britannica featurettes on the Roman Empire; and a set of six color production stills. The Blu-ray disc was released in the United Kingdom on May 16, 2011.

== Reception ==
=== Critical reaction ===
Bosley Crowther of The New York Times sharply criticized the film writing, "So massive and incoherent is it, so loaded with Technicolored spectacles, tableaus and military melees that have no real meaning or emotional pull, that you're likely to have the feeling after sitting through its more than three hours (not counting time out for intermission), that the Roman Empire has fallen on you. The reason it misses is obvious—misses as entertainment, that is, not as a mass of noisy footage that leaves the senses flattened and numbed. There isn't a character in it for whom you're made to care two hoots—or, indeed, made to feel is important, or, for that matter, made to understand. The fellows who wrote the screenplay—Ben Barzman, Basilio Franchina and Philip Yordan—have failed completely to shape a drama that has human interest or even sense." A review in Time magazine criticized the production design as well noting, "Bronston's Rome is patently too fabulous to have been built in a day, but it doesn't look lived-in either. Director Anthony Mann makes it a picture-book setting aswarm with extras behaving like extras and movie stars all dressed up to face posterity in spanking new tunics, togas, and armor."

Hollis Alpert of Saturday Review wrote: "Never before have script writers (there were three involved) written a screenplay like this one, in which the two main parts are complete voids. One must assume Mr. Bronston offered Mr. Boyd and Miss Loren huge sums to journey to Spain for the movie, they took time only to read the contract and not the script. Several others also appear to great disadvantage in the film, among them James Mason, Omar Sharif, Mel Ferrer, and Anthony Quayle." Philip K. Scheuer, reviewing for the Los Angeles Times, felt the film was "more like a recapitulation of all the great movie spectacles, historical and pseudo, than a monumental entity in itself." He further wrote "Yet the only emotion it engenders is excitement—intermittent excitement, and its art lies in its parts (the camera work, the color, a few of the performances, even the music) but not in their sum. Its triumph is the triumphs of its technicians, of matter over mind." In contrast, Robert J. Landry of Variety praised the film, summarizing: "Large in theme and concept, colorful in treatment, The Fall of the Roman Empire is Sam Bronston's greatest coup de cinema."

Among later reviews, Mike Cummings from AllMovie gave the film a positive review, praising the film for its performances and musical score. Leonard Maltin awarded the film 3 1/2 out of 4 stars, writing "Intelligent scripting, good direction, and fine acting place this far above the usual empty-headed spectacle". Steven H. Scheuer disliked the film at first and asked his Movies on TV readers to "excuse the divine Sophia Loren for looking so uncomfortable," but later reconsidered his opinion and rated it 3 out of 4 stars.

On the review aggregator Rotten Tomatoes, 56% of 50 critics gave the film a positive review. The consensus summarizes: "Wrangling a civilization's slow decline into a runtime that's frustratingly episodic, The Fall of the Roman Empire is splendid to look at but climaxes the sword-and-sandal genre more with a whimper than a bang."

=== Box office ===
The film grossed $4.8 million at the box office in the United States and Canada, from which it returned nearly $1.9 million in distributor rentals in the United States and Canada.

=== Accolades ===
Awards
Award	Date of ceremony	Category	Recipients and nominees	Result
Academy Awards	April 5, 1965	Best Music, Score – Substantially Original	Dimitri Tiomkin	Nominated
Golden Globe Awards	February 8, 1965	Best Music, Original Score	Dimitri Tiomkin	Won

== Aftermath ==
Following the release of The Fall of the Roman Empire, Bronston was slated to release Circus World in the following June. In March 1964, it was reported that Pierre S. du Pont III took over the company, in which he had signed guarantee bonds for the films to reach completion so it would enable Bronston to raise finance. However, two months later, in June 1964, Bronston Production filed for Chapter 11 bankruptcy reporting over $5.6 million in debts to du Pont.

In May 1971, Bronston attempted a comeback with a planned epic about Isabella of Spain. Glenda Jackson had signed to portray the title role while John Philip Law was to play Ferdinand II, but the film was never made. In the following June, a court ordered Bronston to pay du Pont $3 million.

During the bankruptcy proceedings, Bronston was asked, under oath, by a lawyer for one of the creditors if he had had an account in Zürich at any time while running the company. He answered that the company had had an account there for six months. While that answer was true, later research found that Bronston personally had had an account in Zürich at another time, and the lawyers referred the case to federal prosecutors who secured a perjury conviction against Bronston. He appealed, on the grounds that while he had not told the whole truth, he had not been lying about the company's Zürich account. The Second Circuit Court of Appeals upheld the conviction, but in 1973 the United States Supreme Court agreed with Bronston, holding unanimously that "literally truthful but technically misleading" answers to questions under oath did not constitute perjury and instead examiners should ask further questions clarifying the matter.

== See also ==
- Gladiator – a 2000 film that also tells a fictionalized version of Commodus's reign with strong similarities
- Roman Empire: Reign of Blood – a 2016 docudrama series about the rise and fall of Commodus
- Historiography of the fall of the Western Roman Empire
- List of American films of 1964
- List of films set in ancient Rome
- List of Roman emperors
- The Five Good Emperors, of which Marcus Aurelius was the last

== Works cited ==
- Barzman, Norma (2003). The Red and the Blacklist: The Intimate Memoir of a Hollywood Expatriate. New York: Nation Books. ISBN 978-1-560-25617-5.
- Canutt, Yakima; Drake, Oliver (1979). Stunt Man: The Autobiography of Yakima Canutt. Walker and Company. ISBN 978-0-802-70613-3.
- Heston, Charlton (1979). The Actor's Life: Journals, 1956–1976. Pocket Books. ISBN 978-0-671-83016-8.
- Heston, Charlton (1995). In the Arena. New York: Simon & Schuster. ISBN 0-684-80394-1.
- Martin, Mel (2007). The Magnificent Showman: The Epic Films of Samuel Bronston. BearManor Media. ISBN 978-1-593-93129-2.
- Winkler, Martin M. (2009). The Fall of the Roman Empire: Film and History. John Wiley & Sons. ISBN 978-1-405-18223-2.
