= Samuel Bronston =

American film producer (1908–1994)

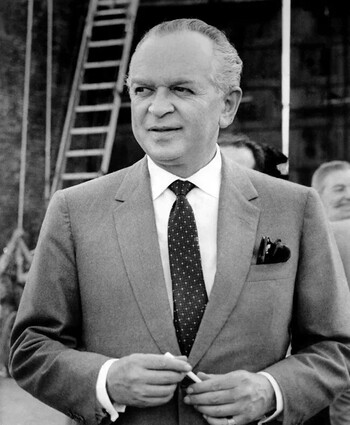
- Bronston in 1962
- Born: Samuel Bronstein; 7 August 1908; Bessarabia, Russian Empire
- Died: 12 January 1994 (aged 85); Sacramento, California, US
- Occupations: Film producer; media executive
- Years active: 1939–1964
- Spouses: Sarah Bogatchek (div. 1953) Dorothea Robinson (m. 1953)
- Children: 5, including William
- Relatives: Leon Trotsky (uncle)

Samuel Bronston (né Bronstein; 7 August 1908 – 12 January 1994) was a Bessarabian-born American film producer and media executive. His films have earned a total of seven Academy Award nominations.

Born in Bessarabia, Russian Empire (present-day Moldova), Bronston immigrated to the United States in 1937. A year later, he met James Roosevelt, the son of U.S. President Franklin D. Roosevelt, and moved to Los Angeles. Together, they formed a brief but fruitless partnership. Roosevelt left Hollywood to return to active military service. Bronston then joined Columbia Pictures, and worked as an associate producer on The Adventures of Martin Eden (1942). A year later, in 1943, Bronston founded his namesake studio Samuel Bronston Productions, and produced Jack London (1943) for United Artists. He next collaborated with Lewis Milestone on the war film A Walk in the Sun (1945) and René Clair on the mystery film And Then There Were None (1945); however, Bronston went uncredited as he struggled to raise financing.

Bronston left Hollywood and worked as a photographer for the Vatican. There, he produced at least 26 documentary films, in which he explored the Vatican's archives. In 1955, Bronston returned to Hollywood as an independent producer. Four years later, in 1959, Samuel Bronston Productions was relocated to Madrid. Bronston pre-sold his films to international distributors and raised financial capital through private investors, including financier Pierre S. du Pont III. In Madrid, Bronston spearheaded several productions of historical epics, including King of Kings (1961), El Cid (1961), 55 Days at Peking (1963), and The Fall of the Roman Empire (1964).

By June 1964, Bronston declared bankruptcy due to the box office failures of The Fall of the Roman Empire and Circus World (1964), in which he owed over US$5.6 million to du Pont III. He subsequently produced Savage Pampas (1966) and Dr. Coppelius (1966), albeit uncredited. During his bankruptcy proceedings with his creditors' attorneys, while under oath, Bronston was found to have committed perjury. He was convicted on one count of perjury but was later acquitted in a prominent case before the U.S. Supreme Court, which set a major precedent for perjury prosecutions. In 1994, Bronston died in Sacramento at the age of 85.

== Early life ==
Bronston (né Bronstein) was born on 7 August 1908 in Kishinev, Bessarabia, Russian Empire (present-day Moldova) to a Jewish family. His father, Abraham Bronstein, worked as a baker and dessert maker. He was the third-born of nine siblings, which included five brothers and four sisters. Through his father's lineage, Bronston was the patrilineal nephew to Leon Trotsky, whose real name was Lev Davidovich Bronstein.

Abraham was not enamored with the then-ongoing Russian Revolution of 1917–1923 and prepared to leave for Paris, where the rest of his family stayed. Abraham's sons emigrated first, and then his daughters. In Paris, Bronston studied to become a surgeon but fainted at his first autopsy. He instead turned to playing the flute and became an amateur photographer. He was educated at the Sorbonne, where he studied history and the visual arts. His early photography career led to an interest in the film industry, where he worked as a film publicity agent for Metro-Goldwyn-Mayer (MGM) in Europe.

In 1932, Bronston was accused of writing bad checks, and he fled to the Netherlands to avoid a jail sentence. He was apprehended by French authorities and released from police custody. He migrated with his family to England in the following year. There, he met Charmian London, the second wife of author Jack London. While in England, Bronston's family had aspirations to relocate to the United States.

== Career ==
=== 1937–1945: Early Hollywood years ===
In 1937, Bronston arrived in the United States on a boat at the age of 29. He anglicized his surname due to anti-Semitism. For about a month, he resided in an apartment complex in the Bronx with his cousin, Leon Patlach. He then moved to Washington, D.C., where he met James Roosevelt, the son of U.S. President Franklin D. Roosevelt. By 1938, Bronston and James Roosevelt moved to Los Angeles; in December, Roosevelt was hired as a vice president for Samuel Goldwyn Productions, a position he held for six months. In 1939, Roosevelt formed his production company, Globe Productions, to produce films for penny arcades. In April 1940, the Los Angeles Times reported both Roosevelt and Bronston planned to produce three potential projects: The Bat with Alfred Hitchcock to direct; Pot o' Gold, an adaptation of the syndicated radio series; and an untitled third film that was to be produced and directed by John Stahl. The deal was later extended to five films, which included The Adventures of Martin Eden, a film adaptation of the novel Martin Eden by Jack London. All these films were intended for theatrical release by United Artists. However, by late October 1940, Roosevelt re-enlisted with the United States Marine Corps Reserve (MARFORRES), thereby ending their partnership. Their film The Adventures of Martin Eden was therefore left without a distributor.

In late April 1941, Bronston signed with Columbia Pictures to work as an associate producer on The Adventures of Martin Eden (1942). A month later, Sidney Salkow was hired to direct, while Glenn Ford and Claire Trevor were enlisted to portray the lead roles. Filming began on 15 October 1941. In 1943, Bronston formed his namesake production company, Samuel Bronston Productions. As his inaugural project, he produced the 1943 film Jack London for United Artists. The film was an adaptation of the biographical book authored by London's widow Charmian. The film starred Michael O'Shea as Jack London, while Susan Hayward was cast as Charmian. Before the film's release, Bronston signed an optioning deal with Charmian for the screen rights to her husband's other novels.

Bronston's second project was City Without Men (1943). In 1944, Bronston enticed director Lewis Milestone away from the Hollywood studio system and signed him to a multi-picture contract to direct independent films, which were to be distributed by United Artists. Meanwhile, Bronston also had contracted two French directors René Clair and Julien Duvivier, with the intention they would adapt Jack London's other novels, which included The Valley of the Moon, The Star Rover, and The Little Lady of the Big House. During the summer of 1944, Bronston acquired the screen rights to Agatha Christie's 1943 play And Then There Were None (which was also performed under the title Ten Little Indians), with Clair hired to direct the film adaptation.

Meanwhile, Bronston decided to produce a film adaptation of the 1944 book A Walk in the Sun by Harry Brown, after the Zeppo Marx Agency had sent him a copy. Bronston subsequently purchased the screen rights to Brown's novel for $15,000 (equivalent to $274,338 in 2025). Milestone also agreed to direct Borrowed Night, a film adaptation of Oscar Ray's novel. In November 1944, United Artists cancelled two of Bronston's projects in development, which included a film adaptation of Edward Chodorov's 1944 play Decision and Final Hour, an original film about munitions manufacturers. The former project was dropped due to opposition from the United States Office of War Information (OWI) as the story concerned a returning U.S. war veteran who discovers fascism rampant at home. That same month, Duvivier sued Bronston for $395,000, alleging a breach of contract on his two-picture deal. Duvivier had been set to direct Decision, in which Bronston agreed to modify the adaptation treatment to secure approval from the OWI.

Bronston then proceeded with A Walk in the Sun (1945) with Milestone as co-producer and director. Robert Rossen was hired to write the screenplay, and principal photography began in November 1944 at the Agoura Ranch within the San Fernando Valley. Financing of the film was initially handled by the bank creditor Walter E. Heller & Co., which loaned $850,000, while Ideal Factoring Co. loaned $300,000. Back in New York, Bronston was alarmed when Heller & Co. withdrew its financial backing. By this point, the project was $45,000 in debt so Milestone deferred $30,000 of his own salary to pay the remainder. Bronston then tried to re-negotiate with Heller & Co, but they later withdrew their offer. Bankrupt, Bronston withdrew from his producing duties on A Walk in the Sun. Milestone flew to Chicago and successfully negotiated a deal for $750,000. Filming proceeded and wrapped on January 5, 1945.

However, United Artists decided not to distribute the film as they had agreed to release The Story of G.I. Joe (1945), another war film. Milestone then presented the film to Darryl Zanuck of Twentieth Century-Fox, who agreed to distribute the film. In August 1946, Variety anticipated while A Walk in the Sun had earned $1.6 million in distributor box office rentals, it would leave no immediate net profit to reimburse Bronston, Milestone, and the creditors' financial investments. Before the film's release, Bronston filed suit against the bank creditors and five other individuals connected with the film for $3.36 million for the film rights, along with $1 million in punitive damages. He had alleged the defendants committed "oppression and fraud" in which Bronston's interest in the film rights that was submitted as collateral were sold without his knowledge.

By January 1945, Bronston had withdrawn from producing And Then There Were None (1945). A new production company Popular Pictures, Inc., headed by Harry Popkin and Edward J. Peskay, was formed to finish the project. Popkin and Peskay acquired the script, which had been written by Dudley Nichols. The principal cast, which had been hired, remained with the project. It was later distributed by Twentieth Century-Fox.

=== 1946–1954: Intermediate years ===
In March 1946, Bronston announced he would produce a biographical film of John Paul Jones. He stated he had wanted to commence filming during the summer with the cooperation of the United States Navy. A month later, Bronston offered the project to Warner Bros. Pictures. However, the project was dropped due to the needed expenses and lengthy screen time necessary to cover the subject adequately.

Bronston left Hollywood but wanted to produce more films. In 1949, he became the official photographer of the Vatican. There, he heard the Knights of Columbus were planning an ambitious project to photograph the Vatican into a thirty-part film series. He accepted the offer and was given unprecedented access to the Vatican's archives. He produced at least 26 documentaries on behalf of the Chancellery of the Vatican. Bob Considine served as the narrator for these documentaries. However, the intense heat generated from the high-key lighting caused a minor fire in the chapel, and relations between Bronston and the Vatican soured not long after.

A year later, in 1950, Variety reported Bronston had returned to the United States, having spent 15 months filming inside the Vatican. Bronston, who had been the production chief of All-Nations Television Corp., intended to release his documentary as a series of shorts for theatrical distribution. He also sought to publish pictures of the Vatican in Life magazine.

=== 1955–1964: Independent producer ===
==== John Paul Jones ====
By August 1955, the Los Angeles Times reported that Bronston had returned to Hollywood, with plans to produce an independent project. He returned to the idea of a biographical film of John Paul Jones, which he had earlier considered in 1946. When Bronston arrived in the United States as an immigrant, he studied American history in preparation for his citizenship test, and Jones's life resonated with him. In December 1955, Bronston announced he was developing the biopic, with John Wayne in mind to star. Jesse Lasky, Jr. was also hired to write the script. To reestablish his dormant production company, the country of Spain was recommended to him for potential filming by Jose Maria Areilza, then-Spanish Ambassador to the United States, whom Bronston met at a dinner party in Washington, D.C. Bronston agreed and relocated his studio near Las Rozas in Madrid.

In October 1957, director John Farrow had signed on to direct the film, as part of a three-picture contract deal with Bronston. The two other projects were slated to be Son of Man, a religious biopic of Jesus, and The Story of Nelson. Before filming began, Robert Stack had been cast in the title role, with supporting roles filled by Macdonald Carey, Charles Coburn, Marisa Pavan, and Jean Pierre Aumont. Bette Davis made a cameo appearance as Catherine the Great. To finance the film, Bronston formed an investment company called Admiral Pictures Corp., with R. Stuyvesant Pierrepont as the board chairman. Bronston raised financial capital from multiple investors, including financier Pierre S. Du Pont III (of the du Pont family). In his autobiography, Stack stated that several American corporations had frozen assets in Spain that could only be reinvested locally. Among them, Du Pont agreed to invest $5 million into the film.

Principal photography began in January 1958, with scenes shot in Versailles in France, Scotland, and Ostia, near Rome. Filming was also allowed inside the Royal Palace of Madrid by the Francoist Spanish government. However, casting an actor to portray George Washington proved difficult, which delayed filming of scenes featuring Washington. At one point, Farrow and Bronston sent one-dollar U.S. bills to casting agents, asking them to help select an appropriate actor who most resembled him. Farrow eventually selected American actor John Crawford, who was vacationing in Madrid at the time. During filming, Farrow had Crawford deliver his dialogue with his back turned to the camera. Filming wrapped on August 5, 1958.

John Paul Jones was released in June 1959 to mixed reviews from film critics. James Powers of Variety wrote in his review: "John Paul Jones has some spectacular sea action scenes and achieves some freshness in dealing with the Revolutionary War. But the Samuel Bronston production doesn't get much fire-power into the characters. They end, as they begin, as historical personages rather than human being." The film earned $1 million in distributor rentals from the United States and Canada, becoming a box office flop. Despite losing his investment, Du Pont III told Bronston he did not invest in individual projects but "rather in the ability of men."

==== King of Kings ====
Despite the financial failure of John Paul Jones (1959), John Farrow and Bronston formed a production company, Brofar, and they proceeded on their second project. The next month, Bronston announced the project was a religious biographical film of Jesus, tentatively titled Son of Man. It had been an independent project Farrow had been developing since 1953. Meanwhile, Twentieth Century-Fox, under the leadership of studio president Spyros Skouras, had been long in development of The Greatest Story Ever Told (1965), another religious biopic of Jesus. According to Variety, Skouras learned about Bronston's rival project and attempted to acquire it for $1 million. However, Bronston refused, stating: "I'm in the business of producing not of abandoning motion pictures. Too many people have invested too much effort into this venture."

By 1959, Farrow exited the project due to creative differences with the script. Screenwriters Alan Brown and Sonya Levien had been selected to rewrite Farrow's script. Nicholas Ray was then hired to direct for $75,000 (equivalent to $828,339 in 2025) for 24 weeks of work. Ray then asked Philip Yordan to write a new screenplay. Yordan was initially reluctant, but he agreed; he retitled the script to King of Kings. At the Vatican, Bronston presented the script, credited to Yordan and Italian theologian and playwright Diego Fabbri, to Pope John XXIII, who approved it.

Actor Jeffrey Hunter was cast as Jesus after John Ford had suggested him as a candidate, having directed him in The Searchers (1956) and Sergeant Rutledge (1960). Ray was familiar with Hunter, having directed him in The True Story of Jesse James (1957). Bronston agreed because of Hunter's striking blue eyes, explaining: "I really chose him for his eyes. It was important that the man playing Christ have memorable eyes." Principal photography began on 24 April 1960 and ended on 4 October. For King of Kings (1961), Bronston continued to pre-sell his films to international distributors and had private investors finance the production budget. Among them was Pierre S. du Pont III, who contributed nearly $1.4 million of the film's $7 million production budget.

After the 1960 Cannes Film Festival, MGM studio president Joseph Vogel and other studio executives visited the set during filming, and became interested in securing the distribution rights due to their concurrent success of Ben-Hur (1959). By December 1960, Bronston sold the distribution rights to Metro-Goldwyn-Mayer (MGM). The studio did not provide any financing towards the film, but Bronston signed guarantee bonds with MGM, ensuring the film's completion.

King of Kings was released in October 1961 and received mixed reviews from film critics. Bosley Crowther, in his New York Times review, felt the filmmakers had "missed or disguised certain happenings that were dramatic and important in Jesus' life. They have obfuscated the healings, avoided the miracles and skipped altogether the judgment of Jesus as a blasphemer and seditionist by the Jews ... In short, the essential drama of the messianic issue has been missed and the central character has been left to perform quietly in a series of collateral tableaux." However, at the box office, King of Kings earned $8 million in distributor rentals from the United States and Canada.

==== El Cid ====
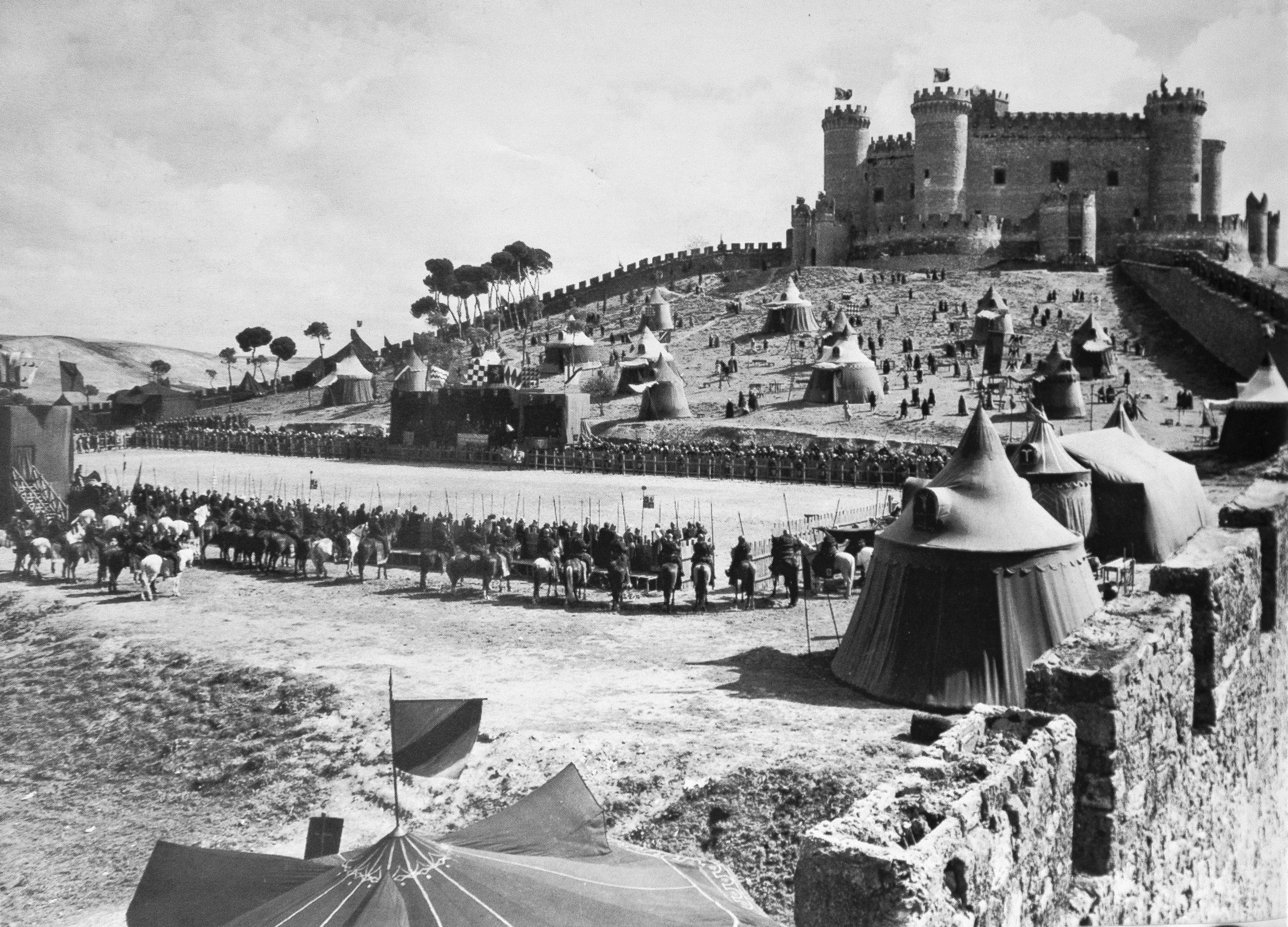
Filming for the jousting sequence in El Cid, near the Castle of Belmonte, Spain.

According to the El Cid film souvenir program, written by Harold Lamb, Bronston first contemplated El Cid (1961) as a potential film project in 1958. The film tells a fictionalized account of Rodrigo Díaz de Vivar, a Castilian knight, whom the Moors called "El Cid"—which translates to the Lord—from the Arabic term "El Seid." Alone in his convictions, the Cid finds himself in a battle of feudal rivalries while the kingdom of Spain faces an invasion from the Moors, led by Ben Yusuf.

In April 1960, Variety announced that Bronston was independently producing El Cid after he had purchased screenwriter Fredric M. Frank's 140-page film treatment. In July 1960, Bronston next hired Anthony Mann to direct the film and Philip Yordan to write the final script. A known Hispanophile, Mann expressed excitement at the project: "The reason I wanted to make El Cid was the theme 'a man rode out to victory dead on his horse.' I loved the concept of that ending."

Both Bronston and Mann had Charlton Heston in mind to portray the lead role. Bronston also had envisioned Sophia Loren in the role as Rodrigo's wife, Chimene. Loren was hired for $1 million (equivalent to $10.8 million in 2026), becoming the second actress to receive a one-million dollar salary for a film (behind Elizabeth Taylor). After she was cast, Loren read Yordan's draft but was displeased with her dialogue. She recommended Ben Barzman, a blacklisted screenwriter, to rewrite it. During a flight trip to Madrid, Mann flew with Barzman and handed him the latest shooting script. Barzman read it and agreed to rewrite a new screenplay. Before the film's premiere, Bronston paid Barzman a $50,000 bonus and purchased his wife Norma a mink coat she did not ask for.

Before principal photography was to begin, Bronston faced an infringement lawsuit from Cesáreo González's Aspa Films, who had announced his El Cid project in 1956. By August 1960, Bronston negotiated to have Aspa Films and Robert Haggiag's Dear Film involved in his production, making El Cid an American-Italian-Spanish co-production. Principal photography began on November 14, 1960, where interior scenes were shot the Chamartín, Sevilla, and Cea studios in Madrid. Additional interior filming was shot at Cinecittà in Rome, while second-unit filming used actual locations, including the Belmonte Castle. Heston finished filming his scenes in April 1961, with the duel fight of Calahorra sequence.

Released in December 1961, El Cid was released to critical acclaim, with praise for Mann's direction, the cast, and the cinematography. At the box office, the film earned $12 million in distributor rentals from the United States and Canada. At the 34th Academy Awards, in 1962, the film received three Academy Award nominations for Best Art Direction—Color, Best Music Score of a Dramatic or Comedy Picture and Best Original Song for the "Love Theme From El Cid (The Falcon and the Dove)".

==== 55 Days at Peking ====
55 Days at Peking (1963) was conceived during a story conference between Philip Yordan and Bernard Gordon. Yordan was initially reluctant to adapt the historic 1900 international siege stemming from the Boxer Rebellion into a film, but warmed up to the idea after a vacation cruise. Bronston agreed to adapt the event into a historical epic because he supported international unity. In September 1961, Bronston announced the film was in development, with a British director in mind to helm the project. Alec Guinness was intended for one of the lead roles. Nicholas Ray, who was set to direct an epic retelling of the French Revolution, decided instead to direct 55 Days at Peking and Yordan (serving as a front for Gordon) was to write the script. In December 1961, both men persuaded Charlton Heston, who was set to star in The Fall of the Roman Empire (1964), to star in their film, following the premiere of El Cid.

Weeks after his announcement, Bronston faced another infringement complaint, this time from producer Jerry Wald who went public about his in-development project, tentatively titled The Hellraisers. Wald told Variety he had filed an infringement complaint with the Motion Picture Association of America (MPAA) and his project once had similar talent behind it. In 1956, Wald claimed he discussed the project in detail with Yordan while developing No Down Payment (1957) at Twentieth Century Fox; Wald had also wanted Guinness to star in his project as well. By April 1962, Wald's infringement complaint proved to be unsuccessful, and he began redeveloping his project into a television film for NBC. Wald however died three months later, on 13 July.

Principal photography began on 2 July 1962, again at Bronston's studios in Las Rozas. The production was beset with numerous difficulties, including an unfinished shooting script, which Ray was dissatisfied with. Having pre-sold his film, Bronston wanted the film ready for its agreed-upon release date. During filming, Bronston had heated discussions with Ray over the project. On 11 September 1962, Ray suffered a heart attack after a few months of filming. Guy Green was hired to direct the remaining scenes between Heston and Ava Gardner, while Andrew Marton directed the remaining sequences, including the beginning and opening scenes. Principal photography ended on 15 November 1962.

Released in May 1963, 55 Days at Peking received mixed reviews from film critics, who praised the production design, but were not impressed with the script. By January 1964, 55 Days at Peking had earned $5 million in distributor rentals from the United States and Canada. Due to the film's estimated $9 million production budget, the film did not earn a profit in the United States, but recouped its cost from international territories.

==== The Fall of the Roman Empire ====
Before his success with El Cid (1961), Bronston wanted Anthony Mann to direct another epic for him. Having finished filming El Cid, Mann saw an Oxford concise edition of Edward Gibbon's six-volume series The History of the Decline and Fall of the Roman Empire near the front window at the Hatchards bookshop. Mann did not read the entire edition but selected the focal point of Marcus Aurelius's death and his son Commodus's reign as the beginning of the end of Rome's decline as an imperial power, as theorized by Roman historians.

Enthusiastic about the project, Bronston announced the film's development in September 1961, with Mann and Charlton Heston as the director and featured star, respectively. However, Heston backed out as he disliked an early draft of the script, and agreed to star in 55 Days at Peking. In response, Bronston had the construction replica of the Roman Forum dismantled and replaced with the Forbidden City sets. When 55 Days was completed, the replica set was rebuilt to the scale of 400 x 230 metres (1312 x 754 feet). Ben Barzman and Basilio Franchina, an Italian screenwriter, were selected to write the screenplay, while an ensemble cast included Stephen Boyd, Sophia Loren, Alec Guinness, Christopher Plummer, James Mason, Anthony Quayle, Omar Sharif, John Ireland, and Mel Ferrer.

Similar to his earlier productions, Bronston refused to use miniatures or matte paintings, insisting the set be built to life-size scale, where he invited investors and international distributors to visit the set. During filming, in February 1963, Martin Rackin, then-head of production of Paramount Pictures, visited the set and was left impressed. He told the Los Angeles Times: "When 9,300 people reported for work, it was like D-Day. It took me 40 minutes just to drive around the set. They took the scale of Cleopatra and doubled it." By December 1963, Paramount Pictures agreed to distribute Bronston's next four films, for an investment of $40 million.

Released in March 1964, The Fall of the Roman Empire received mixed reviews from film critics. Bosley Crowther of The New York Times was the sharpest, arguing: "There isn't a character in [the film] for whom you're made to care two hoots —or, indeed, made to feel is important, or, for that matter, made to understand. The fellows who wrote the screenplay — Ben Barzman, Basilio Franchina and Philip Yordan—have failed completely to shape a drama that has human interest or even sense."

Due to claims of historical inauthenticity, Mann subsequently shot back: "Now I guarantee you there is not one person had read Gibbon ... From Bosley Crowther on down or up. And for them to start to say: 'This isn't Gibbon'—well, this is a lot of crap! Because all we were trying to do was dramatize how an empire fell. Incest, buying an army, destroying the will of the people to speak through the Senate, all these things ... were in the film." The film was a costly box office flop, earning $1.9 million in distributor rentals in the United States and Canada.

==== Circus World ====
Circus World (1964) departed from Bronston's period films since it was not derived from a historical event. In 1961, Bernard Gordon thought of doing a large-scale "circus picture—not the standard story of the girl trapeze artist and the lion tamer—but one that would have a free form—the great circus moving all around the world wherever a colorful site could lend itself to a unique and daring stunt." The project passed from multiple directors including Nicholas Ray, Frank Capra, and then Henry Hathaway. The cast included John Wayne, Claudia Cardinale, Rita Hayworth, Lloyd Nolan, and Richard Conte. Principal photography began on 29 September 1963, and wrapped in February 1964. Bronston also arranged to have the film marketed and screened in Cinerama. Circus World was shot in 35 mm Technirama, and was then blown up to 70 mm for a curved projection using anamorphic lens.

Because The Fall of the Roman Empire and Circus World had both gone over budget (costing a total of $24 million), Pierre S. du Pont III asked Bronston to sign him as the principal trustee, granting him control over Bronston's films. This way, Bronston could not proceed with any contractual or financial measure without du Pont's full approval. By 6 March 1964, du Pont III had acquired control over Bronston Productions. It was also separately reported half of the 40-person staff at Bronston Productions' New York office had been laid off with no warning. By 25 March, feeling shut of his own studio, Bronston challenged the trusteeship by hiring Louis Nizer as his attorney. In response, du Pont III hired Thomas Dewey, the former Governor of New York and two-time Republican presidential nominee in the 1944 and 1948 elections, as his attorney. During the same week, The Fall of the Roman Empire (1964) premiered and later became a financial failure. Undeterred, Paramount announced it would release Circus World later that year, with its investment in the film left intact.

Released in June 1964, Circus World received a mixed reception from film critics. A review in Time magazine stated: "Though likable enough, this least pretentious of Bronston spectaculars cannot compare to The Greatest Show on Earth. It's just a minor romantic tearjerker, it's Stella Dallas with stardust." It was another box office failure, earning $1.6 million in distributor rentals.

=== 1964–1993: Financial bankruptcy and last years ===
Before Circus World was released, Bronston had filed for Chapter 11 bankruptcy, reporting over $5.6 million in accumulated debts to du Pont III. At this point, Bronston had pledged to continue producing films in Spain, with several projects in development including Battle of the Bulge, Suez, Brave New World, Nightrunners of Bengal, Paris 1900, and The French Revolution.

Bronston tried to reorganize his studio operations in Madrid and convinced the Banco Español de Crédito not to foreclose on the mortgage of his properties. He leased his studios to Televisión Española (TVE) due to his connections with Adolfo Suárez, who was the programme director of the state broadcaster. Another part of his studio was lent to Twentieth Century-Fox, which used the facilities to shoot four films in Spain, which included 100 Rifles (1969) and Patton (1970). Philip Yordan also formed a production company called Scotia International after he purchased a terrain near Ajalvir. There, he used Bronston's studios to film Battle of the Bulge (1965) and Krakatoa, East of Java (1968). Yordan, who had worked with Bronston, decided to remain uninvolved throughout Bronston's financial struggles.

During the financial litigations, Jaime Prades, an associate producer on Bronston's films, arranged enough financing to produce small-scale films such as Savage Pampas (1966), starring Robert Taylor. The film had been long in development since 1958, with Steve Barclay and Hugo Fregonese set to produce and direct, respectively. Plans were intended to shoot in Argentina. For the 1966 film adaptation, Fregonese returned to direct. Bronston however was uncredited. This was followed up with Dr. Coppelius (1966), a film adaptation based on the comic ballet Coppélia. The story concerns the title character, who constructs a doll named Coppelia that is quite lifelike that people mistaken it for a real woman. The film starred Walter Slezak in the title role, and filming began in late 1966. Meanwhile, in late December 1966, du Pont III won a summary judgment award of nearly $3.6 million, in which the court affirmed Bronston's statements that he was not obligated to pay three signed promissory notes were "without valid basis."

In April 1966, Bronston announced he would produce a biographical epic about Isabella of Spain, with José María Pemán as the screenwriter. He had secured financial backing from a pool of Spanish investors, and attained the support of Manuel Fraga, the country's Minister of Information and Support. In 1971, Bronston again announced his intentions to produce Isabella of Spain. The Los Angeles Times reported that Brosnan had cleared his "technical-legal monetary problems" and found new financing from Marion Harper, an advertising executive based in Madison Avenue. He had opened new production offices in London and Madrid, where filming was scheduled to begin. Ronald Neame was hired to direct and John Peebles had written a script. Glenda Jackson had signed to portray the title role while John Philip Law was to play Ferdinand II.

Meanwhile, the Banco Español de Crédito launched an inquiry into Bronston Productions when payments into Bronston's debts were not producing interest. The bank decided to foreclose even though TVE had been using the studio. The bank appealed to Fraga's successor Alfredo Sánchez Bella, who was not sympathetic to Bronston. Sánchez Bella ordered the TVE to vacate the studio, though TVE's president Adolfo Suárez refused because production for the following year would be adversely affected. However, Sánchez Bella won out, and as TVE vacated, the bank foreclosed on the studio.

By June 1971, Isabella of Spain was cancelled. An auction, ordered by the Banco Español de Crédito, was held to sell all assets within Bronston's studios, from waste baskets to antique production sets. The auction lasted for four days, with the proceeds transferred to the Union of Film Workers, which had filed suit on behalf of select union members owed thousands in back payment. During the same month, the New York State Supreme Court ordered Bronston to pay du Pont III nearly $2.5 million plus interest, for a total of $3 million.

==== Bronston v. United States ====
Meanwhile, Bronston found himself in other legal issues, concerning perjury. In 1966, he was questioned under oath at a creditors' committee meeting about the production company's overseas financial assets. It included the following exchange between Bronston and one of the lawyers for his creditors:

Q. Do you have any bank accounts in Swiss banks, Mr. Bronston?
A. No, sir.
Q. Have you ever?
A. The company had an account there for about six months, in Zürich.
Q. Have you any nominees who have bank accounts in Swiss banks?
A. No, sir.
Q. Have you ever?
A. No, sir.

The creditors' attorneys later discovered that Bronston indeed had an active personal bank account in Geneva while he was an active film producer. In 1969, he was charged with two federal counts of perjury for denying he had a Swiss bank account and denying he retained an interest in a potential Spanish Symphony film for the Spanish government. On 7 October, Bronston pled not guilty on both counts in a federal court. In February 1971, a jury found Bronston guilty on one count of perjury. A sentence hearing was set for 16 March, in which Bronston faced a potential jail sentence of five years. At the time, Bronston had been freed on a $10,000 bond. The case was next appealed to the Second Circuit Court. In April 1971, a jury upheld the perjury charge. Judge Charles H. Tenney stated he disagreed with the jury verdict. While he refrained from issuing a jail sentence, nevertheless, Tenney imposed a $2,000 fine against Bronston. In December 1971, the U.S. Court of Appeals for the Federal Circuit upheld the perjury charge, in a 2–1 decision.

The case Bronston v. United States ultimately reached the United States Supreme Court. On 10 January 1973, the Supreme Court overturned the conviction, which ruled that while Bronston's answer was "shrewdly calculated to evade," it did not rise to the level of perjury because he told the literal truth. Over two decades later, the case was invoked by President Bill Clinton's attorneys when he was charged with perjury during his impeachment trial.

By January 1973, Bronston had moved to Dallas and relocated his studio operations there, forming Bronston Film International, Inc. His long-dormant project Isabella of Spain was back into development, with Glenda Jackson and John Philip Law in their intended roles, along with Tom Baker and Irene Papas. He told the Fort Worth Star Telegram: "And, although I'll continue filming in Spain, with the corporate headquarters in Dallas, I can see that Dallas is the coming area for motion picture production. It reminds me a lot of Spain when I first went there to make films 14 years ago."

Bronston briefly returned to film production with Brigham (1977), a biographical film about American religious figure Brigham Young. Since Bronston was a devout Catholic, he went to the Vatican to get permission to be involved with the film. He also released The Mysterious House of Dr. C. (1979), a reworked version of the 1966 film Dr. Coppelius. He was last credited on Fort Saganne (1984), a French film starring Gérard Depardieu and Catherine Deneuve.

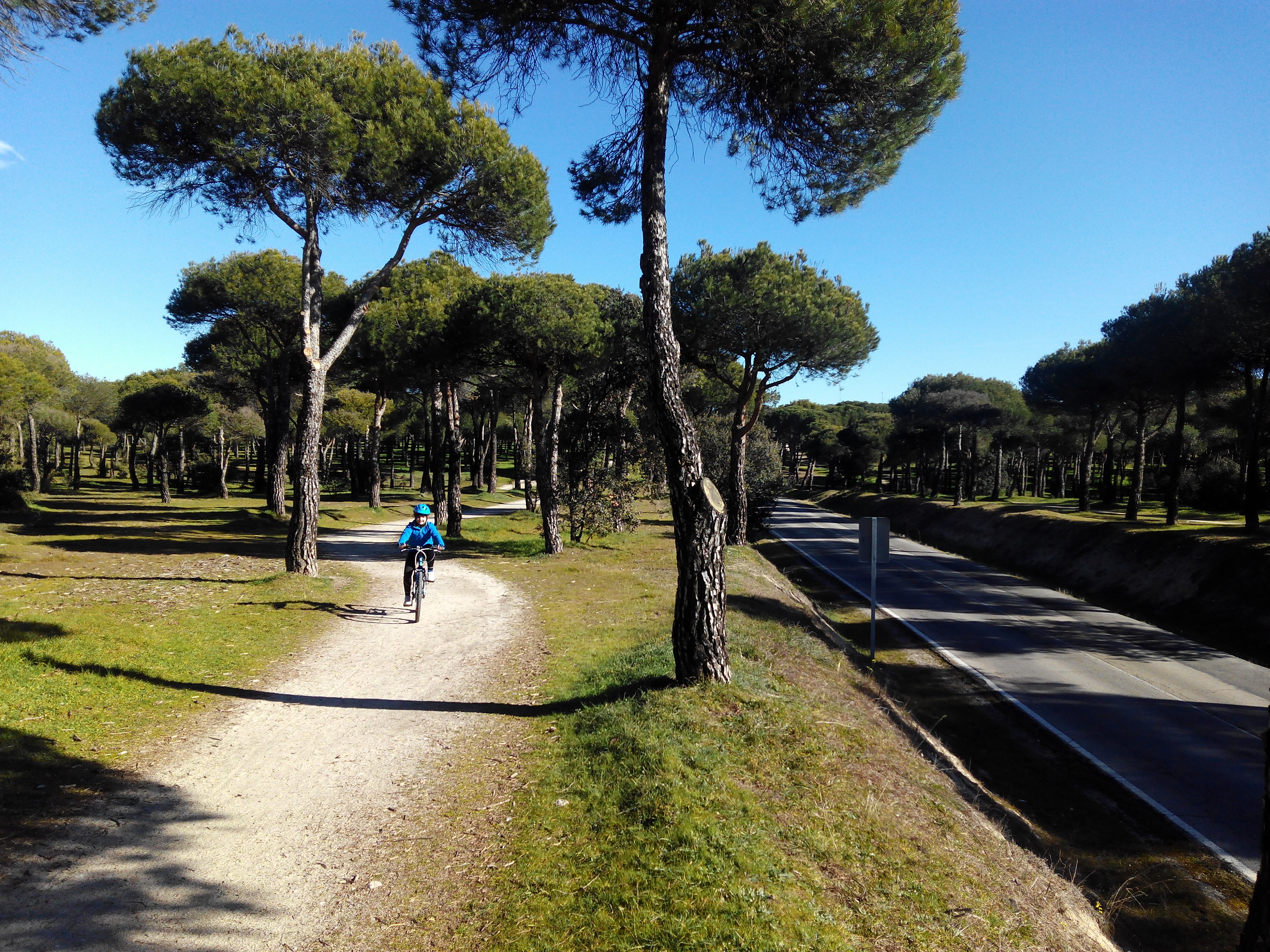
Calle Samuel Bronston in Las Rozas honors its famous neighbor.

== Personal life and death ==
Bronston was first married to Sarah Bogatchek (1911–1990), who was a concert pianist. They had one son, William, and one daughter Irene. In 1947, he met his partner Robert Haggiag's wife, Dorothea Robinson, in New York. Years later, they divorced their respective spouses, and were married in Mexico on 14 July 1953. The two had three children: Andrea, Phillip, and Kira.

On 12 January 1994, Bronston died from pneumonia secondary to Alzheimer's disease in Sacramento, California, at the age of 85. He is buried in Las Rozas, Madrid, Spain.

== In popular culture ==
- Several fictional films shown in The Kentucky Fried Movie (1977) are jokily produced by a fictional movie producer, "Samuel L. Bronkowitz" (a conflation of Samuel Bronston and Joseph L. Mankiewicz).
- In 2024, a biographical documentary titled Samuel: Hollywood vs Hollywood was produced and released in Spain.

== Filmography ==
- The Adventures of Martin Eden (1942)
- City Without Men (1943)
- Jack London (1943)
- A Walk in the Sun (1945)
- John Paul Jones (1959)
- King of Kings (1961)
- El Cid (1961)
- 55 Days at Peking (1963)
- The Fall of the Roman Empire (1964)
- Circus World (1964)
- Savage Pampas (1966)
- Dr. Coppelius (1966)
- Brigham (1977)
- Fort Saganne (1984)

== Works cited ==
- Barzman, Norma (2003). The Red and the Blacklist: The Intimate Memoir of a Hollywood Expatriate. Nation Books. ISBN 978-1-560-25617-5.
- Bassinger, Jeanine (2007) [1979]. Anthony Mann: New and Expanded Edition. Wesleyan University Press. ISBN 978-0-819-56845-8.
- Besas, Peter (1985). Behind the Spanish Lens: Spanish Cinema under Fascism and Democracy. Denver, Colorado: Arden Press. ISBN 0912869062.
- Darby, William (2009). Anthony Mann: The Film Career. McFarland & Company. ISBN 978-0-786-43839-6.
- Eisenschitz, Bernard (1993). Nicholas Ray: An American Journey. Faber and Faber. ISBN 978-0-571-17830-8.
- Eyman, Scott (2014). John Wayne: The Life and Legend. Simon & Schuster. ISBN 978-1439199589.
- Fleischer, Richard (1993). Just Tell Me When to Cry: A Memoir. Carroll & Graf. ISBN 978-0-881-84944-8.
- Gordon, Bernard (1999). Hollywood Exile: or How I Learned to Love the Blacklist. University of Texas Press. ISBN 978-0-292-72827-1.
- Heston, Charlton (1979). The Actor's Life: Journals, 1956–1976. Pocket Books. ISBN 978-0-671-83016-8.
- Martin, Mel (2007). The Magnificent Showman: The Epic Films of Samuel Bronston. BearManor Media. ISBN 978-1-593-93129-2.
- Millichap, Joseph R. (1981). Lewis Milestone. Boston: Twayne Publishers. ISBN 978-0-805-79281-2.
- Rosendorf, Neal (2000). The Life and Times of Samuel Bronston, Builder of 'Hollywood in Madrid': A Study in the International Scope and Influence of American Pop Culture (PhD thesis). Harvard University.
- Rosendorf, Neal (March 2007). "Hollywood in Madrid: American Film Producers and the Franco Regime, 1950–1970". Historical Journal of Film, Radio and Television. 27 (1): 77–109. doi:10.1080/01439680601177155. S2CID 191616477.
- Rubin, Steven Jay (2011). Combat Films: American Realism, 1945–2010 (Second ed.). Jefferson, North Carolina: McFarland. ISBN 978-0-786-48613-7.
- Stack, Robert; Evans, Mark (1980). Straight Shooting. New York: Macmillan. ISBN 0-02-613320-2.
