= Dr. Coppelius =

- Spanish: El Fantástico mundo del doctor Coppelius
- Directed by: Ted Kneeland
- Written by: Charles Nuitter; Arthur Saint-Leon; Jo Anna Kneeland; Ted Kneeland; Víctor M. Tarruella
- Produced by: Frank J. Hale; Ted Kneeland; Alfred J. Piccolo; Víctor M. Tarruella; Samuel Bronston
- Cinematography: Cecilio Paniagua
- Edited by: Juan Serra
- Production companies: Copelia; Frank J. Hale Productions
- Distributed by: Izaro Films; Childhood Productions
- Release date: December 1966
- Running time: 94 minutes
- Countries: Spain; United States
- Language: English

Dr. Coppelius (or El Fantástico mundo del doctor Coppelius) is a 1966 Spanish English-language comedy film based on the ballet Coppélia directed by Ted Kneeland and featuring Walter Slezak and Claudia Corday. Produced by Samuel Bronston, is also known as The Mysterious House of Dr. C.

== Production ==
Filming took place in Spain in late 1966.

== Reception ==
The New York Times called it a "spooky but nonthreatening confection", though it noted the title of its American release, was misleading: "Not a horror flick as one might assume, The Mysterious House of Dr. C is a respectable adaptation" of Kneeland's ballet.
