= Circus World (film) =

1964 film

- Theatrical release poster by Frank McCarthy
- Directed by: Henry Hathaway
- Screenplay by: Ben Hecht; Julian Halevy; James Edward Grant
- Story by: Bernard Gordon; Nicholas Ray
- Produced by: Samuel Bronston
- Starring: John Wayne; Claudia Cardinale; Rita Hayworth; Lloyd Nolan; John Smith; Richard Conte
- Cinematography: Jack Hildyard
- Edited by: Dorothy Spencer
- Music by: Dimitri Tiomkin
- Production company: Samuel Bronston Productions
- Distributed by: Paramount Pictures
- Release date: June 25, 1964
- Running time: 135 minutes
- Country: United States
- Language: English
- Budget: $9 million (estimate)
- Box office: $1.6 million (United States/Canada rentals)

Circus World (released as The Magnificent Showman in the United Kingdom) is a 1964 American Western drama film starring John Wayne, Claudia Cardinale and Rita Hayworth. It was directed by Henry Hathaway and produced by Samuel Bronston from a screenplay by Ben Hecht, Julian Zimet (writing under the pseudonym Julian Halevy), and James Edward Grant, and a story by Bernard Gordon and Nicholas Ray.

The idea for Circus World originated from screenwriter Bernard Gordon. Nicholas Ray was initially assigned to direct the project until he suffered a heart attack while filming 55 Days at Peking (1963). He was replaced by Frank Capra, who later entered into creative differences with co-writer James Edward Grant and John Wayne. By the summer of 1963, Capra was replaced with Henry Hathaway. Filming commenced in September 1963 and concluded in February 1964.

Prior to the film's release, the financial failure of The Fall of the Roman Empire (1964) caused Samuel Bronston Productions to accumulate severe debts to financier Pierre S. du Pont III. It would be the last in a series of big budget epics produced by Bronston in Spain. The film premiered at the Loew's Cinerama Theater on June 25, 1964. It received mixed reviews from film critics and was a financial disappointment.

== Plot ==
Matt Masters (John Wayne), a Wild West circus star in the mold of Buffalo Bill Cody, bought a bankrupt circus in 1885 and successfully rebuilt it into a combination three ring and Wild West extravaganza. He has successfully toured the United States for more than a decade. Now that the century is about to turn, he wants to take his show to Europe.

His Circus Boss, Cap Carson (Lloyd Nolan), is against taking the show across the Atlantic. He calls Matt on his reason for making a European tour: Masters wants to find the lost great love of his life, Lili Alfredo (Rita Hayworth), and figures that this tour will smoke her out if for no other reason than to see her child, Toni Alfredo (Claudia Cardinale), Masters' adopted daughter. One of his Western stars and wannabe-partner, Steve McCabe (John Smith), also attempts to dissuade Masters. Masters buys a freighter, renames her the Circus Maximus, and the show sails for Europe.

At Barcelona, the Circus Maximus capsizes at the pier and puts the show out of action. Masters has to release most of his performers, board out his animals, and go back to performing an act for the Ed Purdy Wild West Show, a staple on the European circus circuit. "While touring Europe at Ed Purdy's expense," as Masters puts it, he, Cap, Steve, and Toni scout acts that will enable Masters to relaunch the Matt Masters Circus bigger and better than ever.

His first new hire is Tojo the Clown and the Wire-Dancing Ballerina (Richard Conte and Katharyna respectively). They have a unique act; Tojo is dressed as a clown but walks the high wire over a cage full of lions while coaching the Ballerina (his niece Giovanna) as she dances on a wire on the ground. Backstage, Masters discovers that Tojo is an old acquaintance — Aldo Alfredo, brother-in-law of his lost love Lili Alfredo. Despite his reservations at hiring a possible enemy Masters takes the act on and neither he nor Aldo admit to Toni, who is Aldo's niece, that they have met before; or that Tojo the Clown is her uncle.

His second new act is Emile Schumann, a French animal trainer who has a spectacular act involving lions who lie down on him in the ring. Masters offers to take him on if he will switch from lions to tigers (Masters has many tigers but few lions). By the time the circus is ready to re-launch, Emile has so adapted to working with a different variety of big cat that when a couple become ill, he demands that Masters hire a doctor for "HIS tigers."

The third addition to the performers' roster is Margo Angeli, an artist of the high trapeze. In reality, Margo is the vanished Lili Alfredo, haunted by the guilt of having been caught up in a love triangle, blaming herself for the death of her flyer husband who had fallen — or did he miss Aldo's catch on purpose? She had run away from the world of the circus and kept on running, finding solace first in the Church and then in the bottle.

As Masters had hoped it would, the lure of her daughter brings Lili out of hiding. The two have an intense confrontation in a bar, ending with Masters slamming a full bottle of brandy down in front of Lili and telling her that she needs to decide whether the booze or her child is more important to her. Lili quits drinking and goes into training to seek a position in the new Matt Masters Circus, then in winter quarters near Madrid.

Meanwhile, Toni has fallen for Steve and he for her, despite an age difference of at least a decade. Matt has to come to terms with the fact that his adopted little girl is a grown woman. "Margo's" reappearance helps, and she is secretly amused by Toni's attempts to pair her off with Matt.

Inevitably, the truth comes out. On the afternoon of the rehearsal for the first show of the circus season in Vienna, Toni finds a poster of The Flying Alfredos in her wagon living quarters with "Suicide" daubed on it in red. She also finds a newspaper clipping of the Flying Alfredos that allows her to identify "Margo" as her mother. There is a stormy confrontation with many passionate, hateful words on Toni's part between her, Lili and Matt; and Matt has to tell her that he was the second man in the love triangle. Toni curses both of them just before a bugle call summons the show to Dress Rehearsal.

The rehearsal opens to empty seats with Grand Parade. Partway through the opening, a fire breaks out in Wardrobe and spreads to the Big Top. Fast action by Lili, Matt, Steve, Toni, Cap and Aldo prevents injury to the circus performers and manages to save about half of the tent from the flames. The one positive thing to come out of the fire is a rapprochement between Toni and Lili.

Matt somehow obtains permission from the Emperor to set up the circus in the grounds of the Imperial Palace. The show is a smash success, with a new act headlining: Lili and Toni Alfredo performing a swing-over routine fifty feet in the air. Ultimately Matt, Lili, Toni, and Matt's new partner and Toni's new fiancé, Steve, are shown taking bows to the applause of the people and the Crown.

== Cast ==
- John Wayne as Matt Masters
- Claudia Cardinale as Toni Alfredo
- Rita Hayworth as Lili Alfredo
- Lloyd Nolan as Cap Carson
- Richard Conte as Aldo Alfredo
- John Smith as Steve McCabe
- Katharyna as Giovana
- Katherine Kath as Hilda
- Wanda Rotha as Mrs. Schuman
- Kay Walsh as Flo Hunt
- Francois Calepides as Ringmaster
- Margaret MacGrath as Anna
- Miles Malleson as Billy Hennigan
- José María Caffarel as Barcelona's Mayor
- Robert Cunningham as Ringmaster
- Hans Dantes as Emile Schuman
- Moustache as Bartender (uncredited)
- George Tyne as Madrid Bartender (uncredited)
- Víctor Israel as unknown (uncredited)

== Production ==
=== Development ===
The initial idea for the film was conceived by screenwriter Bernard Gordon. In 1961, Philip Yordan recommended to Gordon that they should produce another large-scale film, in which Gordon suggested a circus film set in Europe. Writing in his autobiography, Gordon centralized on the idea of "the great circus moving all around the world wherever a colorful site could lend itself to a unique and daring stunt." While under contract to produce another film for Samuel Bronston, director Nicholas Ray agreed to the idea and worked with Gordon on a treatment in Paris.

In August 1962, Paramount Pictures announced they would be co-producing a circus movie in collaboration with Bronston, which would be tentatively titled Those Were the Days and would be set in the early part of the 20th century. John Wayne was attached to star and the project was to be directed by Nicholas Ray. Filming was scheduled to start in Spain in August 1963, following the completion of 55 Days at Peking (1963) and The Fall of the Roman Empire (1964). The budget was expected to be $6.5 million. However, by the next month, Ray had suffered a heart attack while filming 55 Days at Peking.

In November, Bronston announced that Ray would be replaced by Frank Capra, by which time the project was re-titled Circus. Before then, Capra was developing a film adaptation of Taylor Caldwell's novel Dear and Glorious Physician, a biography of Luke the Evangelist. Martin Rackin, who was Paramount Pictures' head of production at the time, notified Capra about the circus project. Capra became interested in the project as he had not worked with Wayne before and flew to Madrid to begin writing a new script.

Wary of the script issues, Wayne enlisted for James Edward Grant to help rework the script. Grant was initially reluctant, but Bronston offered him a three-picture deal to which he accepted. As Grant was co-writing the script, he had creative differences with Capra, finding Capra's script to be "so incredibly old-fashioned that Duke comes out sometimes as Harold Lloyd, sometimes as Oliver Hardy and sometimes as ... Stan Laurel. When you read this thing, it is easy to understand why this guy hasn't had a hit since [screenwriter] Robert Riskin died." According to Capra, Grant told him that he and Wayne would "knock you out a screenplay in a week. All you gotta have in a John Wayne picture is a hoity-toity dame with big tits that Duke can throw over his knees and spank, and a collection of jerks he can smash in the face every five minutes. In between, you fill in with gags, flags and chases. That's all you need, his fans eat it up."

When Wayne had arrived in Spain, he rejected Capra's script as uninteresting and unworkable. Yordan wanted to fire Capra, although it would cost $150,000 in severance pay. Ultimately, Capra was fired from the project in July 1963. He was replaced by Henry Hathaway. That same month, The New York Times had reported that Capra wanted to make the film a light comedy, while Bronston insisted it be a romantic melodrama. They had also reported that shooting would still resume in the summer.

With Hathaway onboard, he initially sought Wendell Mayes to help salvage the script, but he was already contracted on another film project for 20th Century-Fox. Hathaway then enlisted Ben Hecht to retool the script in two weeks by retaining the opening shipwreck and the big-top fire scenes, but improvising the rest. Screenwriter Julian Halevy (a pseudonym for Julian Zimet) was also brought in for on-set rewrites.

=== Casting ===
In March 1963, it was reported that David Niven and Claudia Cardinale had agreed to join the cast. However, by the following August, Niven had been replaced with Rod Taylor and Rita Hayworth had joined the cast. Shortly before filming, Taylor pulled out of the project as he was unhappy with the size of his role, and was replaced by John Smith.

=== Filming ===
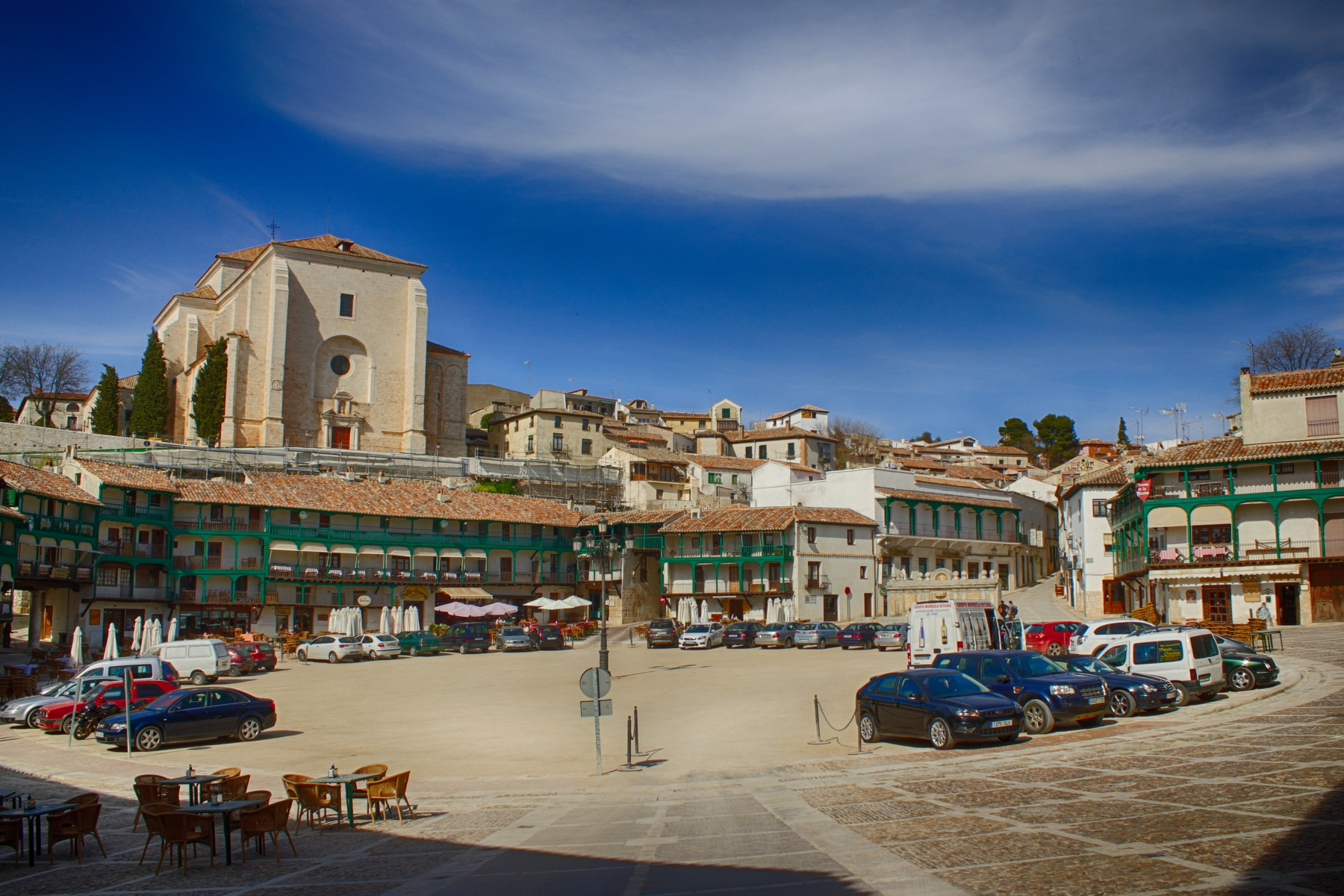
The main square of Chinchón near Madrid was one of the locations (seen in 2013). It was the setting for the outdoors Wild West show.

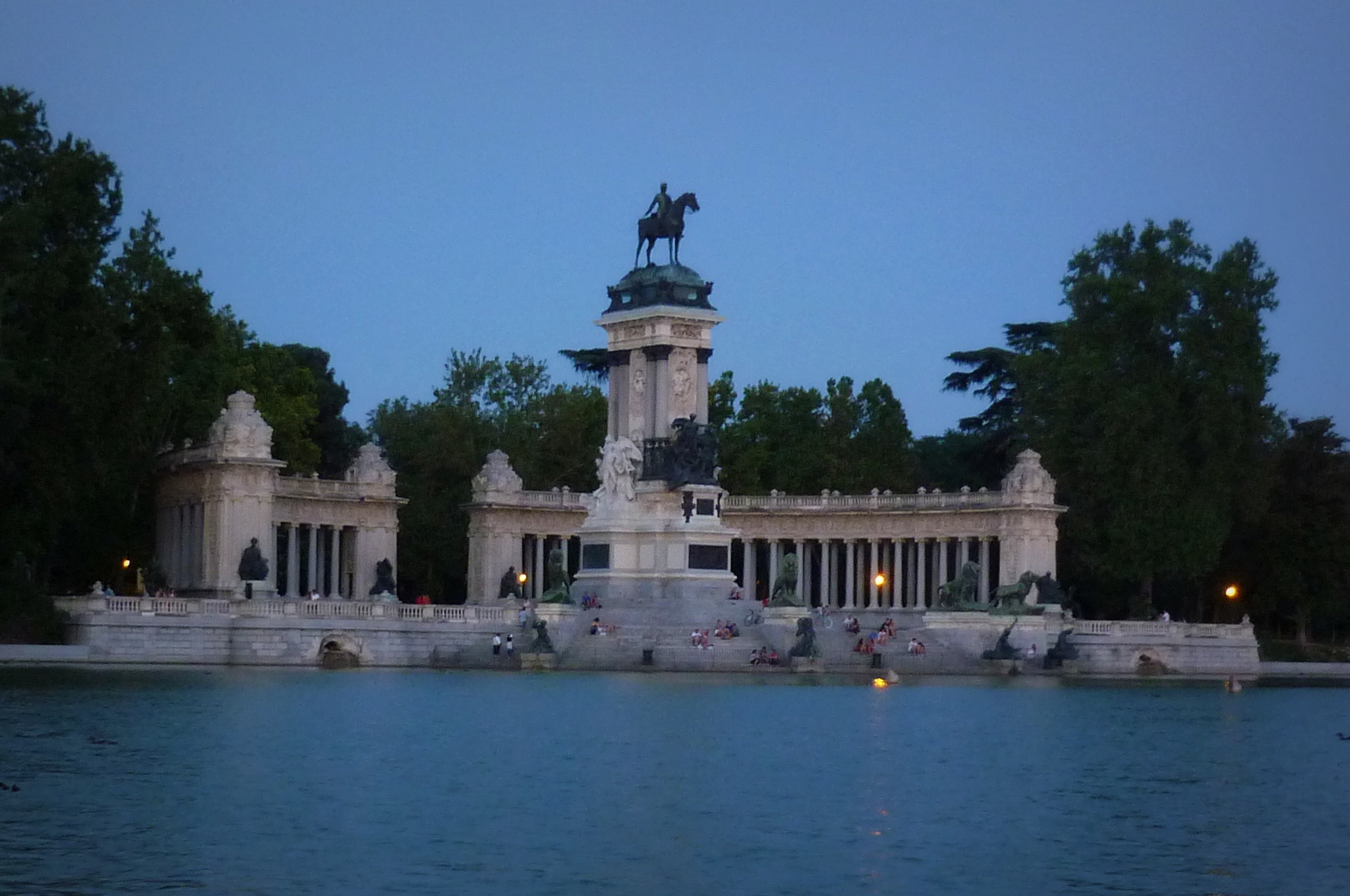
The monument to Alfonso XIII by the pond of the Retiro park (seen in 2012) appears in the background of the final show.

Principal photography started in September 1963, with location shooting in Barcelona, followed by studio shooting at Bronston's production studio in Madrid. In late December 1963, while filming a climactic circus fire scene, an on-set fire occurred, which burned 40 square feet of the set in Aranjuez. Wayne, Hayworth, and other studio personnel emerged unharmed while various animals were moved off the set.

It has been speculated by film historians that at the time this film was made, Rita Hayworth may have been suffering from early onset Alzheimer's disease. Only 46 at the time the movie was made, she was often late on set and had trouble remembering her lines, and it was reported she was often drunk and abusive on the set. John Wayne had previously looked forward to working with her, but allegedly came to despise what he saw as unprofessional behavior.

== Release ==
Prior to the film's release, Paramount Pictures had earlier released The Fall of the Roman Empire, which had become a financial disappointment. In March 1964, it was reported that Pierre S. du Pont III had taken over Samuel Bronston Production as the principal trustee which guaranteed that Circus World would be finished. In spite of this, it was reported that Paramount's investment in Circus World would remain protected and would still proceed with the distribution plans as scheduled. On June 25, 1964, the film premiered at the Loew's Cinerama Theater on a reserved seating basis.

=== Home media ===
On April 7, 2014, Anchor Bay Entertainment released a region B Blu-ray edition in the United Kingdom.

== Reception ==
=== Box office ===
The film earned $1.6 million in box office rentals from the United States and Canada.

=== Critical reaction ===
Bosley Crowther for The New York Times described the film as a "dismally trite and obvious picture that Samuel Bronston has produced and Henry Hathaway has directed. And even with the Cinerama screen—the one-projector, no-lines arrangement—it is pictorially commonplace. The circus acts are the usual flat performances of elephants, horses, dogs, aerialists and wire-walkers, all photographed uninterestingly. Only one, having to do with a lion-tamer and his ferocious wife, has a little wit. And the exposition of the drama is so perfunctory, without style or charm, that you get the impression the actors are soldiering on the job." Time magazine wrote, "Though likable enough, this least pretentious of Bronston spectaculars cannot compare to The Greatest Show on Earth. It's just a minor romantic tearjerker, it's Stella Dallas with stardust ... [t]o sit through the film is something like holding an elephant on your lap for 2 hours and 15 minutes. You can hardly measure what you have there, but it leaves a definite impression: it's big, it's warm-hearted, and it's tons of fun for the kids."

Philip K. Scheuer of the Los Angeles Times wrote the film was "beautifully photographed" and the cast were "at least routinely efficient, Wayne seeming to care and presenting his more ingratiating self. Miss Hayworth is appealing and so are the young romancers. And director Hathaway uses a pro's skill continuously to blend laughs, pathos and excitement." Robert J. Landry for Variety praised the film as a "big screen, big box office wedding of spectacle and romance. It should please the masses everywhere, and especially women and children. The pace, as directed by Henry Hathaway, is unslackening. The plot combines action, color, European scenery, melodrama, disaster by fire and catastrophe by water. Underlying all is family-type sex, old-fashioned morality and ample schmaltz." Filmink argued "there are some terrific sequences".

On the review aggregate website Rotten Tomatoes, 50% of 6 critics' reviews are positive, with an average rating of 4.6/10.

== Comic book adaptation ==
- Dell Movie Classic: Circus World (September–November 1964)

== See also ==
- List of American films of 1964
- John Wayne filmography
- The Greatest Show on Earth (1952) another circus centered epic
