= Bronston v. United States =

1972 U.S. Supreme Court decision holding that literally truthful testimony is not perjury

- Supreme Court of the United States

Argued November 15, 1972 Decided January 10, 1973
- Full case name: Samuel Bronston v. United States
- Citations: 409 U.S. 352 (more) 93 S. Ct. 595; 34 L. Ed. 2d 568

Case history
- Prior: Defendant convicted, U.S. District Court for the Southern District of New York; affirmed, 453 F.2d 555 (2d Cir. 1971).

Holding
- Answers given to questions under oath that are literally truthful but unresponsive or technically misleading do not constitute perjury; proper remedy is clarifying questions by examiner

Court membership
- Chief Justice Warren E. Burger Associate Justices William O. Douglas · William J. Brennan Jr. Potter Stewart · Byron White; Thurgood Marshall · Harry Blackmun; Lewis F. Powell Jr. · William Rehnquist

Case opinion
- Majority: Burger, joined by unanimous

Laws applied
- 18 U.S.C. § 1621

Bronston v. United States, 409 U.S. 352 (1973), is a seminal United States Supreme Court decision strictly construing the federal perjury statute. Chief Justice Warren Burger wrote for a unanimous Court that responses to questions made under oath that relayed truthful information in and of themselves but were intended to mislead or evade the examiner could not be prosecuted. Instead, the criminal-justice system had to rely on more carefully worded follow-up questions.

The decision has been cited in many cases since then and has become the controlling legal standard of perjury in federal jurisprudence. It was invoked during Bill Clinton's impeachment proceedings in 1998 as a defense to charges of perjury against him.

It has long been criticized for the loophole it creates in the perjury statutes as essentially allowing a witness to lie without consequences. Nevertheless, later Courts have refused to overrule or otherwise limit it despite some moves in that direction by lower courts.

== Background of the case ==
Samuel Bronston was a New York-based movie producer who, between 1959 and 1964, made films in various European countries as Samuel Bronston Productions, Inc., a company he wholly owned. He was a pioneer in using countries such as Spain to take advantage of lower production costs. As part of its business operations, the company maintained bank accounts in the countries in which it did business — 37 separate accounts in five different countries, it would be established later.

In 1964, after the epic The Fall of the Roman Empire failed, the company filed for federal bankruptcy protection. Two years later, its owner was being questioned under oath at a creditors' committee meeting about the company's overseas assets. It included the following exchange between Bronston and one of the lawyers for his creditors:

Q. Do you have any bank accounts in Swiss banks, Mr. Bronston?
A. No, sir.
Q. Have you ever?
A. The company had an account there for about six months, in Zürich.
Q. Have you any nominees who have bank accounts in Swiss banks?
A. No, sir.
Q. Have you ever?
A. No, sir.

All those answers were truthful, although the second one is not a direct answer to the question. It would later be discovered that Bronston personally had had an account with International Credit Bank in Geneva, on which he made deposits and drew checks totalling up to $180,000 during the five years in which the company was active and closed just before the bankruptcy filing. As a result, the matter was referred to federal prosecutors, who secured a perjury indictment against Bronston.

=== Trial ===
The government contended that Bronston intentionally answered the second of the series of questions by referring to the company's account in Zurich instead of his own personal one, as the questioner had implied, to leave the impression that he did not have and never had had an account in Switzerland, which was not true. Jurors were instructed that they must consider the witness's state of mind, that if they found that Bronston "fully understood the questions put to him but nevertheless gave false answers knowing the same to be false", they should convict him. After seven hours of deliberations, during which they requested not only additional instructions but that the original instructions be read back to them, as well as reviewing several exhibits in the case, they returned a conviction.

=== Appeal ===
On appeal, Bronston claimed the key question was imprecise and that he should not have been convicted for making an answer that was true and accurate. A divided court upheld the conviction on the grounds that "an answer containing half of the truth which also constitutes a lie by negative implication, when the answer is intentionally given in place of the responsive answer called for by a proper question, is perjury".

The circuit's chief judge, J. Edward Lumbard, dissented, arguing the proper remedy for such answers was "questioner's acuity". Bronston's attorneys filed for certiorari from the Supreme Court, and got it in 1971.

== Decision ==
The Court heard arguments on November 15, 1972. Sheldon Elsen argued for Bronston, with Andrew Frey taking the federal government's side.

Less than two months later, the Court issued its brief ruling, unanimously siding with the appellant. While he conceded that Bronston's answer may have been intended to mislead, Burger felt it would be going far beyond Congress's intent to apply the statute that broadly. He considered Bronston's answer to be a "testimonial mishap that could readily have been reached with a single additional question by counsel alert — as every examiner ought to be — to the incongruity of petitioner's unresponsive answer", a point he reiterates several times throughout the opinion. Such an application also conflicted with the literal wording of the law, which defined perjury as willfully stating under oath any material matter which the witness does not believe to be true.

A casual listener might have believed from Bronston's answer that he himself had never had any Swiss bank accounts, he agreed. "But we are not dealing with casual conversation and the statute does not make it a criminal act for a witness to willfully state any material matter that implies any material matter that he does not believe to be true" since intent to mislead or evade might not be the underlying reason: "Under the pressures and tensions of interrogation, it is not uncommon for the most earnest witnesses to give answers that are not entirely responsive. Sometimes the witness does not understand the question, or may in an excess of caution or apprehension read too much or too little into it."

Witnesses, he understood, might also be reluctant to discuss personally embarrassing matters, particularly in a bankruptcy proceeding. "If a witness evades, it is the lawyer's responsibility to recognize the evasion and to bring the witness back to the mark, to flush out the whole truth with the tools of adversary examination." The trial jury's finding that Bronston had intended to mislead was of no consequence, and indeed should not have been a determination they were allowed to make:

A jury should not be permitted to engage in conjecture whether an unresponsive answer, true and complete on its face, was intended to mislead or divert the examiner; the state of mind of the witness is relevant only to the extent that it bears on whether "he does not believe [his answer] to be true." To hold otherwise would be to inject a new and confusing element into the adversary testimonial system we know. Witnesses would be unsure of the extent of their responsibility for the misunderstandings and inadequacies of examiners, and might well fear having that responsibility tested by a jury under the vague rubric of "intent to mislead" or "perjury by implication."

He reviewed the history of perjury, and recalled that when it first started being prosecuted, authorities realized it had to be narrowly construed, otherwise people would be deterred from testifying over fears of being prosecuted themselves. Existing case law supported that position as well.

"Precise questioning is imperative as a predicate for the offense of perjury", he said, one last time, a sentence frequently quoted since then.

== Legacy ==
The standard established by the decision has become known in criminal law as the "literal truth" rule (the "stark contrast" rule requiring perjury indictments to set out the difference between the allegedly false testimony and the actual truth is often attributed to this case, but arose in a latter appellate decision). Over the years since it was handed down, Bronston has remained, in the words of one commentator, "much-maligned". Criticisms have ranged from prosecutors upset at the limitations it placed on their ability to use the threat of perjury prosecution to compel truthful testimony from hostile witnesses to a Wake Forest professor who cites it as among many aspects of the legal system that have caused a general decline in morality when they became broadly applied outside of the practice of law.

Bronston was never able to successfully return to producing films afterwards, managing to make only 1984's Fort Saganne, a French film directed by Alain Corneau. He died ten years later.

=== Clinton impeachment defense ===
The case came to the fore in 1998, when Bill Clinton's attorneys invoked it as a defense to perjury charges brought by the House of Representatives during his impeachment. They argued that lawyers for Paula Jones had failed to follow up on questions asking Clinton generally if he had ever been alone with Monica Lewinsky to which he had answered "I don't recall". Even though later testimony had established that she was indeed alone with him on several brief occasions, he had not specifically denied it and that the Jones lawyers' failure to ask follow-up questions about specific occasions barred prosecution as surely as the similar failure by Bronston's questioner. They also cited other occasions where Clinton had similarly claimed he didn't remember, and his questioners had simply left the answer at that. The president's purportedly false testimony was, to them, "simply a confused deposition record that could have been clarified contemporaneously".

In response, House impeachment manager Steve Chabot called the resort to Bronston "the cornerstone of the president's defense" and a "legal smokescreen", when presenting the case to the Senate. Clinton, he claimed, could very well remember those things he claimed not to. "[T]he record establishes", Chabot told senators, "that the President repeatedly lied, he repeatedly deceived, he repeatedly feigned forgetfulness."

In 2004, Loyola professor Peter Tiersma, who specializes in language and the law, analyzed Clinton's alleged perjuries closely under the Bronston standard and concluded that while he had not broken the law, he was likely aware of the literal-truth standard from his own time as a law professor and was certainly exploiting it to mislead his questioners. They erred, he said, in coming up with their own definition of sexual relations, which allowed Clinton to look for ambiguities and then take advantage of them on the stand.

== Conflicting appellate cases ==
As with other Supreme Court cases, those who have disagreed with Bronston have looked for test cases that might give another set of Supreme Court justices a chance to revisit the original ruling and, if not overrule it, at least limit its scope. Two such cases that reached the federal appeals courts gave rise to such hopes (or fears) with regard to Bronston, but neither made it past that level.

=== United States v. Robbins ===
Like Bronston, this 1988 case arose from a bankruptcy proceeding. Robbins was testifying about a company he had formed called MacArthur and 11th Properties. His questioner mistakenly asked about "11th and Meridian". He answered that that name was unfamiliar to him but he knew of an "11th and MacArthur". Both those answers were true but as a result the line of questioning about the real company was dropped.

The Eighth Circuit upheld his conviction five years later on the grounds that "[a]bsent fundamental ambiguity or impreciseness in the questioning, the meaning and truthfulness of the declarant's answer is for the jury." The Supreme Court declined to hear the case. Legal commentator Barry Tarlow distinguishes the case from Bronston, however, by noting that in this case the defendant had more actively misled the questioner, by volunteering a different yet equally erroneous version of the company name.

=== United States v. DeZarn ===
Later in the 1990s came the DeZarn case. It began with an investigation into possible Hatch Act violations by officers of the Kentucky National Guard. Key to the case was a 1990 Preakness Day party attended by Robert DeZarn, later made adjutant general by Brereton Jones after the latter was elected governor. DeZarn was being questioned about that party by Col. Robert Tripp of the Army Inspector General's office, under oath, when he was mistakenly asked about a 1991 party, which was not at issue. He testified truthfully about it. As a result, the investigators issued a report that the allegations were unsubstantiated.

After the report, another Guard officer came to Tripp and his colleagues with new information which did substantiate some of the allegations, and revealed to them DeZarn's role in the 1990 party. He was indicted on a perjury charge in 1996. His attorneys unsuccessfully sought to have the indictment dismissed on the grounds that his answers were literally truthful. The district court refused to do so since other witnesses had answered questions about the 1991 party with reference to the 1990 one, and that DeZarn's other answers had shown he knew which party was at issue.

He repeated this defense at trial, while prosecutors introduced Louisville Courier-Journal articles showing that he knew very well which party investigators were concerned about. In September he was convicted, and sentenced to 15 months in prison. After his motion for a directed verdict failed, he filed an appeal.

In 1998, a Sixth Circuit panel upheld the conviction (as well as his sentence, which he had argued was improperly enhanced). Gerald Rosen, Chief Judge for the United States District Court for the Eastern District of Michigan, sitting by designation, distinguished DeZarn's answer from the one at issue in Bronston', by noting that DeZarn was not only aware of the party at issue, but unlike Bronston, DeZarn's answer was "unequivocal and directly and fully responsive". Rosen also pointed to subsequent answers which only made sense if DeZarn was referring to the 1991 party. DeZarn had also attempted to argue Robbins wasn't relevant, since in that case the defendant had introduced the mistake, but Judge Rosen noted that fact played no role in the verdict there.

The case was never appealed beyond the Sixth Circuit. Commentators have either hailed Dezarn as "nudg[ing] federal criminal law closer to everyday morality" or decrying it as requiring witnesses to guess what a questioner really means. "The DeZarn decision appears to place the witness at risk — if he or she subjectively misinterprets the state of mind of the interrogator and gives a literally true answer", wrote Barry Tarlow. "This expansion of the traditional definition of perjury is both unwise and unnecessary."

== See also ==
- List of United States Supreme Court cases, volume 409
