= William Bronston =

American physician activist (born 1939)

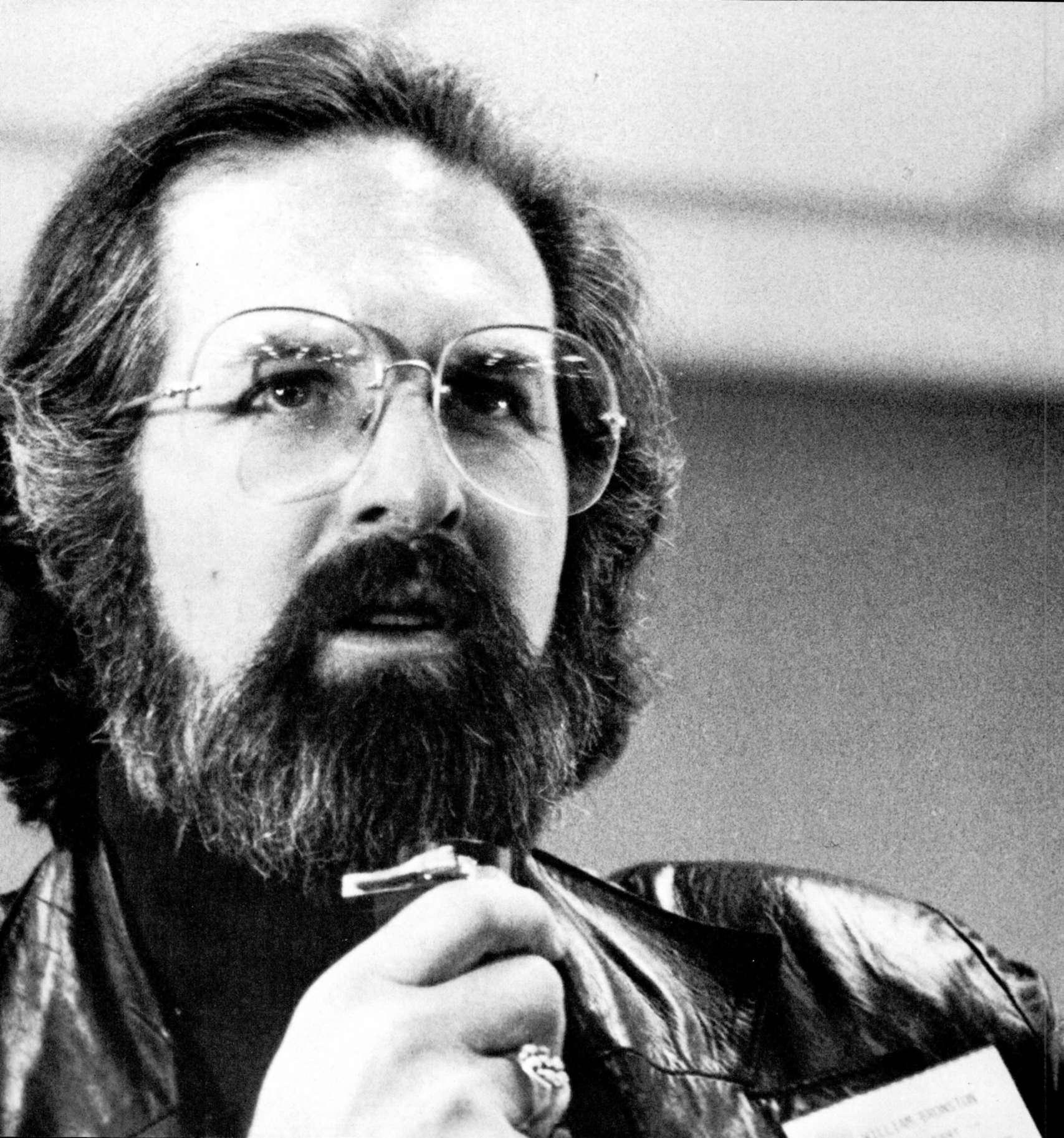
- Bronston in 1981
- Born: March 1939 (age 87); Los Angeles, California, U.S.
- Education: University of California, Los Angeles (BA); University of Southern California (MD)
- Children: 2
- Parents: Samuel Bronston (father); Sara "Dony" Bronston (mother)

William Bronston (born March 1939) is an American physician and activist known for his involvement in the deinstitutionalization of Willowbrook State School in the early 1970s. Born in Los Angeles, Bronston graduated from the University of California, Los Angeles and the USC School of Medicine. At USC, he was a prominent student activist, organizing social and political public health projects and co-founding the New Left Student Health Organization. After graduating from USC in 1965, Bronston began his residency at the Menninger School of Psychiatry in Kansas, but was expelled from the institution after leading a sit-in for improvements in wages and working conditions for direct support professionals.

After his expulsion in 1968, Bronston moved to New York City where he briefly worked at a Black Panther Party medical clinic before leaving to become a staff physician at Willowbrook State School, a state institution for children with intellectual disabilities. At Willowbrook, Bronston quickly became critical of the institution's leadership and standards, clashing with Jack Hammond, the institute's director. In 1971, Bronston went public with his grievances and organized a movement to reform the institution, which culminated in a 1975 court decision deinstitutionalizing the school. Afterwards, Bronston returned to California, where he became the medical director of the Department of Developmental Disabilities at the California Department of Health and later at the California Department of Rehabilitation.

== Early life and education ==
William Bronston was born in March 1939 to Bessarabian-born Jewish American film producer Samuel Bronston (1908–1994) and Ukrainian American pianist Sara "Dony" Bronston (1911–1990). Bronston was born in Los Angeles and raised in an affluent family in Beverly Hills, California. He is the great-nephew to Russian Marxist revolutionary Leon Trotsky. Bronston has one younger sister, as well as four other half or step-siblings. Bronston's parents divorced when he was thirteen and he stayed with his mother with his sister moved in with his father.

Bronston attended West Hollywood Elementary School, Bancroft Junior High School, and Hollywood High School. At sixteen, Bronston enrolled at the University of California, Los Angeles (UCLA), as a pre-med major. Influenced by art history classes he took at UCLA, Bronston switched majors to 20th-century history while also continuing his pre-med studies. At twenty, Bronston married his first wife Janet, a flight attendant for Trans World Airlines (TWA), whom he had met two years earlier. After being rejected from a number of medical schools, Bronston spent a fifth year at UCLA, graduating in 1961 with a Bachelor of Arts in contemporary history with a minor in contemporary art history.

=== Student activism ===
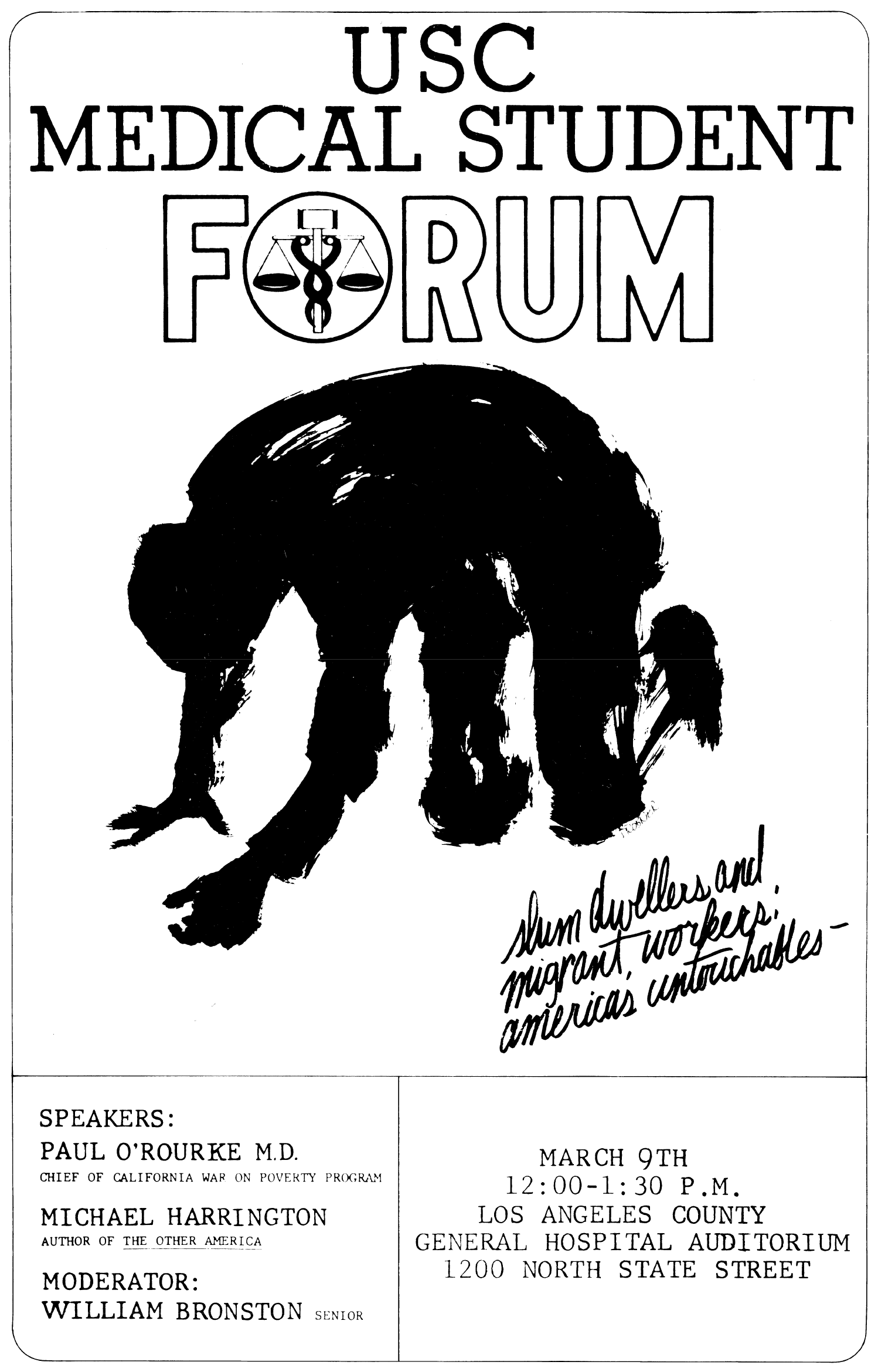
At the USC School of Medicine, Bronston helped organize a series of lecture forums featuring eminent figures in medicine.

After graduating from UCLA, Bronston attended the USC School of Medicine. In his first year, Bronston completed a fellowship in pediatrics at the Child Therapy Clinic at the Children's Hospital Los Angeles under Richard Koch, a professor of pediatrics at USC. In September 1964, when Bronston was a senior, he helped organize the USC Medical Student Forum with sophomore Michael McGarvey and advice from former members of the Association of Internes and Medical Students (AIMS). The USC Medical Student Forum was a series of lecture forums featuring a number of influential figures covering a variety of topics in medicine. These included a forum on the legalization of abortion with Planned Parenthood president Alan Guttmacher, a forum on the health effects of Jim Crow laws with civil rights activist H. Jack Geiger and others with Michael Harrington, Thomas Szasz and Benjamin Spock.

Inspired by the success of the forum, Bronston and McGarvey also began the student newspaper Borborygmi (meaning "stomach rumbles") in 1964, which featured essays and editorials centering on medical students. In January 1965, the two transformed the lecture forums into the Student Medical Action Conference (SMAC), which integrated the forums with praxis by organizing various social and political public health projects. After graduating from USC in spring 1965, Bronston flew across the country to coordinate a national students movement in the health sciences, aided by his access to discounted flights from his wife's job at TWA.

In October 1965, Bronston organized a national convention at the University of Chicago, where Bronston co-founded the Student Health Organization (SHO). The SHO, whose name was based on the World Health Organization, was a product of the New Left and imagined a national organization of medical students similar to the Students for a Democratic Society (SDS) and the Student Nonviolent Coordinating Committee (SNCC).

=== Menninger School of Psychiatry ===
During his senior year of medical school, Bronston toured various post-doctoral programs in Sweden for intellectually disabled children but was unable to attend because the draft board prohibited him traveling abroad. In 1965, Bronston chose to attend the residency program at the Menninger School of Psychiatry at Topeka State Hospital in Kansas. Bronston's first wife Janet did not want to move to Kansas and the two separated that year. At Topeka, Bronston led the predominantly African American direct support professionals in re-activating the dormant health workers' union and organizing a sit-in for improvements in wages and working conditions, which led to his expulsion from the institution in June 1968.

== Career ==
In 1968, Bronston moved to New York City, where he worked as the primary physician in a Harlem poor people's medical center run by the Black Panther Party. At the clinic, which was among the first neighborhood mental health clinics in Manhattan, Bronston worked as part of a survey team on nutrition. Bronston, who was frustrated by the team's limited resources and impact, left in 1970 to become a staff physician at Willowbrook State School, a state facility housing 5,000 mentally disabled adults and children. Bronston also organized a commune in a Victorian Staten Island home and moved in with Michael Wilkins and other friends.

=== Willowbrook State School ===
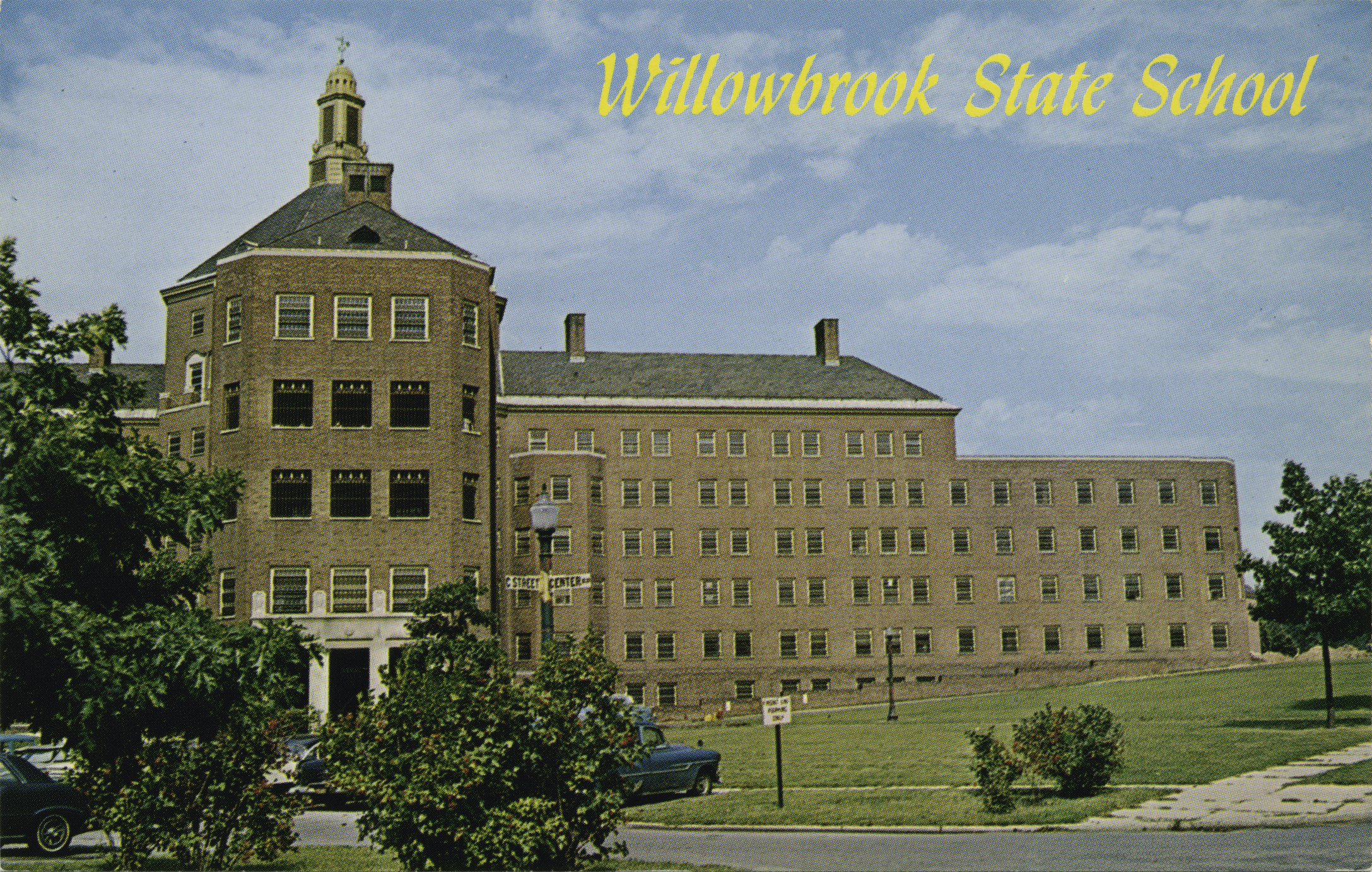
A postcard of Willowbrook State School, where Bronston worked in the early 1970s

At Willowbrook, Bronston became the chief medical officer of Building 76, which housed 200 disabled children. Bronston reported being shocked by the institution's "general disregard of modern medical practice" and scheduled weekly meetings with Jack Hammond, the director of Willowbrook. Their meetings went poorly, with Hammond objecting to Bronston's proposals to reform the system with concerns about practicalities. In response to 1971 budget cuts and a "job freeze" at the institution, Bronston organized a campaign to send Wilkins and Bronston as the joint representatives of Willowbrook at the New York state medical convention. The campaign failed to garner support and received no votes from the staff.

After the failure of his campaign, Bronston narrowed his attention to reforming the practices and organization of Building 76. In order to receive Medicaid funding, physicians at Willowbrook were expected to report IQ scores below 65 for each resident and recommend only treatments and programs that were available at Willowbrook. Bronston, seeking to reform these practices, drafted a plan to Hammond and the ward's nursing supervisor. Under his plan, the ward would report accurate assessments of residents and be reorganized to follow the Swedish theory of normalization by mimicking the environment of a typical home. The nursing supervisor and other staff members were opposed to Bronston's plan, which required the ward's organization be de-centralized into individual household units. After two months with no response, Bronston and Hammond had a meeting, in which Hammond reprimanded Bronston, accusing him of breeding conflict and circumventing the established chain of command. While Bronston was protected from termination because of his civil service tenure, Hammond disciplined him by transferring him to buildings 22 and 23, which housed 470 adult women whom the staff considered the most difficult to control. Bronston attempted to appeal his transfer, but his petitions were rejected.

==== Transfer to buildings 22 and 23 ====
At buildings 22 and 23, Bronston went public with his grievances and started a campaign to politicize the residents' condition as a direct result of negligence. He held meetings with parents, where he brought guest speakers from model programs and described radical changes that could be made to the institution. Encouraged by Bronston's meetings, groups of parents began organizing at meetings of the Benevolent Society—the official organization of parents at Willowbrook—and other social workers at Willowbrook held their own meetings calling on parents to fight against budget cuts. In November 1971, Bronston invited Richard Koch, his university professor, and Jane Kurtin, a reporter for the Staten Island Advance, to visit the facility. Both Koch and Kurtin were shocked by the treatment at Willowbrook; Kurtin's report on the institution, "Inside the Cages", ran on the front page of the Advance, and she went on to write multiple follow-up pieces.

By the end of the month, a group of 100 parents led a demonstration around the institution, holding placards reading "stop the job freeze" and blocking traffic on Victory Boulevard. At Benevolent Society meetings, parents began airing their complaints and listed non-negotiable demands to Hammond. The Federation of Parents Organizations for the New York State Mental Institutions—the collective body coordinating all the Benevolent Societies—demanded that a grand jury be raised to investigate whether charges of criminal neglect could be brought against Willowbrook officials. Hammond responded to Bronston's campaign by prohibiting parent meetings at Willowbrook, later prohibiting all communications between Willowbrook staff and the media, and terminating Wilkins and another staff member, who lacked tenure. Hammond's efforts to suppress protest further emboldened parents and staff; by the last weeks of December, pickets were frequently held in front of Willowbrook and the Advance published numerous investigative reports on the institute. In January 1972, Geraldo Rivera reported on Willowbrook in an influential ABC documentary on the institution and Bronston appeared frequently in talk shows and hearings to discuss his experiences at Willowbrook and criticize representatives for the state of New York.

==== Litigation and Bronston's testimony ====
In March 1972, a group of fifty parents, lawyers and professionals including Bronston convened at the Mount Augustine Retreat House to plan and strategize a campaign to reform the institution. Their meeting culminated in a class action suit headed by attorney Bruce Ennis. Bronston supported Ennis's plan for a lawsuit and stayed at the institution to gather evidence for the case. In September, Bronston took forty photographs documenting lacerations and lesions on patients he had treated at the institute. During the trial, Bronston described the injuries he documented in detail and the effects of gross neglect and abuse at the institute. Bronston's efforts in protesting and publicizing the conditions at Willowbrook culminated in 1975, when a state court ruled that Willowbrook deinstitutionalize its patients.

=== Return to California ===
Bronston returned to California in 1975 and became a consultant medical director at the Department of Developmental Disabilities in the California Department of Health. In California, Bronston was part of a growing group of clinicians opposed to the use of aversion therapy to treat developmental disorders. In an influential 1979 memo to the director of the California Department of Developmental Services, Bronston recommended that the state of California end its relationship with the Behavior Research Institute. Bronston's memo was successful in influencing director David Loberg to overturn a ruling mandating the North Los Angeles County Regional Center continue to fund the institute. In 1980, Bronston was transferred to the California Department of Rehabilitation, where he was the medical director until 2002.

Bronston in 2024

In 1997, Bronston founded Tower of Youth, a digital arts program and annual film festival for young filmmakers, which he directed until 2016. In 2021, Bronston self-published Public Hostage, Public Ransom: Ending Institutional America which details his involvement in Willowbrook State School and advocates for a Medicare for All program.

== Personal life and beliefs ==
Bronston supports the adoption of a single-payer healthcare system and is a member of the advocacy group Physicians for a National Health Program. Bronston has twins: a son and daughter.

== Selected works ==
- Bronston, William; McGarvey, Michael (July 1967). A Treatise on Reformation: The Health Student Movement. Conference on Radicals in the Professions. Ann Arbor, Michigan: Students for a Democratic Society. OCLC 40178449.
- Apolloni, Tony; Cooke, Thomas P., eds. (1981). Consumer Unity: New Platforms for Progress in the 1980s [en] (PDF). Photographs by William Bronston. California Department of Rehabilitation – via Minnesota Governor's Council on Developmental Disabilities.
- Film by William Bronston, music by Gordon Mumma (2006) [1978]. Willowbrook State School: Flagship Institution for the New York Department of Mental Hygiene. OCLC 1127920882 – via Minnesota Governor's Council on Developmental Disabilities.
- Goode, David; Hill, Darryl; Reiss, Jean; Bronston, William (2013). A History and Sociology of the Willowbrook State School. Washington D.C.: American Association on Intellectual and Developmental Disabilities. ISBN 978-1-937604-05-9.
- Bronston, William (2021). Public Hostage, Public Ransom: Ending Institutional America. Conneaut Lake: Page Publishing. ISBN 978-1-68456-909-0.
