= Home video =

Physical media for home viewings

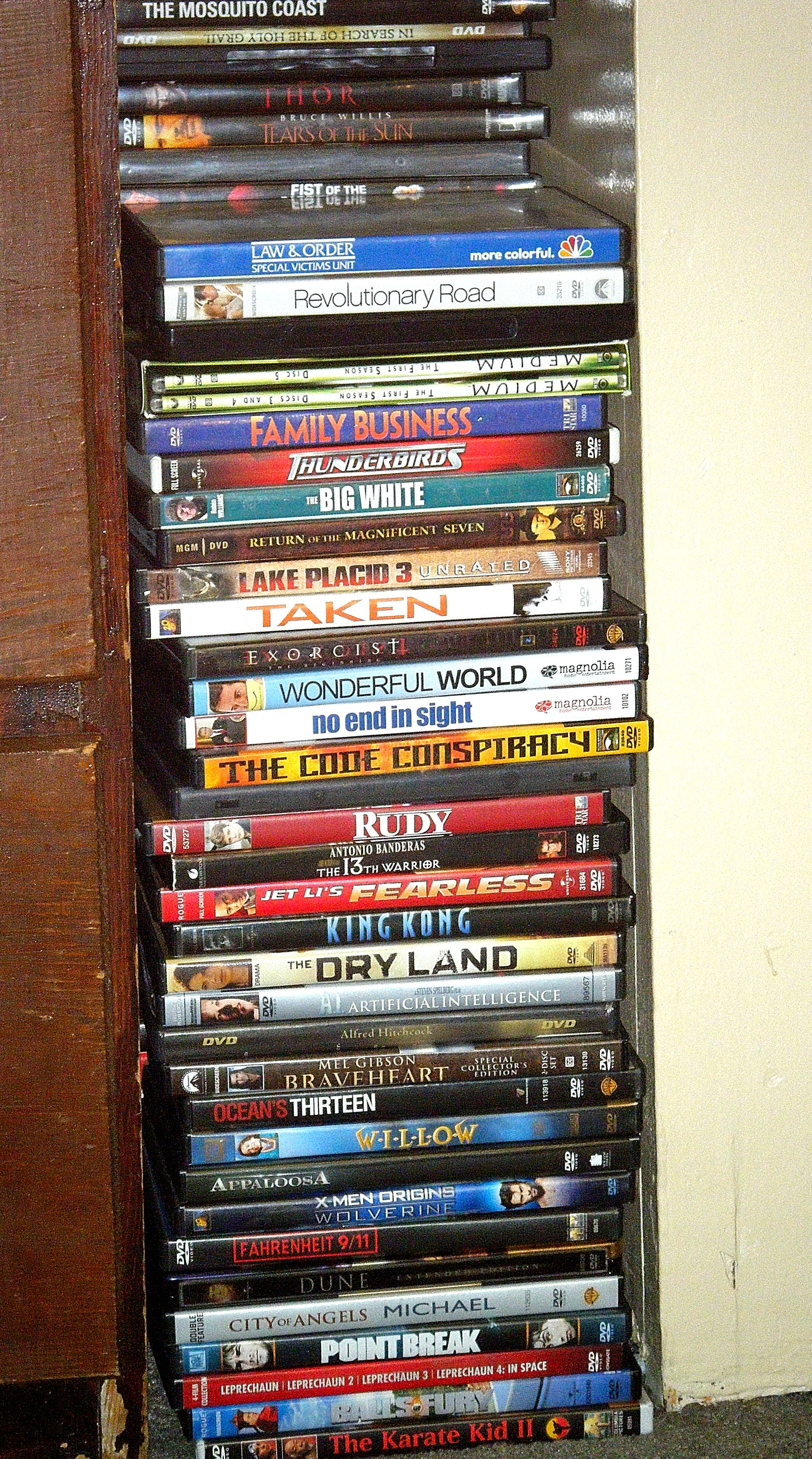
Some home video users have a collection of prerecorded media, such as movies, on DVDs. DVDs are only one of a number of ways of viewing home video.

Home video is a physical home media sold or rented for home viewings. The term originates from the VHS and Betamax era, when the predominant medium was videotapes, but has carried over to optical disc formats such as DVD, Blu-ray, and 4K Ultra HD Blu-ray. In a different usage, "home video" refers to amateur home video recordings, also known as home movies.

Released in 1978, LaserDisc (LD) is another physical home video format, which never managed to gain widespread use on American and British retail markets due to high cost of the players and their inability to record TV programs (unlike VHS), although it retained some popularity among videophiles and film enthusiasts during its lifespan; the format had greater prevalence in Japan and in regions of Southeast Asia such as Hong Kong, Singapore and Malaysia, where it was better supported. Film titles were released in LD format until 2001; production of LD players ceased in 2009.

The home video business distributes films, television series, telefilms and other audiovisual media to the public in the form of physical home video in various formats, either bought or rented and then watched privately in purchasers's homes. Most theatrically released films are now released on digital media (both optical and download-based), replacing the obsolete VHS medium. As of 2006, the Video CD format remained popular in Asia. DVDs have been gradually losing popularity since the late 2010s and early 2020s, when streaming media became mainstream for the audiences, with most media consumers in urban areas globally having domestic Internet access. (Note: According to 2019 data, globally about 72% of households in urban areas have Internet access at home, for rural areas that figure is 38%.)

== History ==
As early as 1906, various film entrepreneurs began to consider the business potential of home viewing of films, and in 1912, both Edison and Pathé started selling film projectors for home use. Because making release prints was (and still is) very expensive—as of 2005, the cost of making a release print was still at least $1,000—early projector owners rented films by mail directly from the projector manufacturers. The Edison company's business model was fundamentally flawed because it had started with phonographs and did not differentiate home viewing from home listening. Edison exited the home viewing business in 1914; Pathé remained active a few years longer, but exited at some point during World War I.

After the quick failures of these early attempts at home viewing, most feature films were essentially inaccessible to the public after their original theatrical runs. For most of the 20th century, the idea that ordinary consumers could own copies of films and watch them at their convenience in their own homes "was beyond the grasp of reasonable expectations." Some very popular films were given occasional theatrical re-releases in urban revival houses and the screening rooms of a few archives and museums. Beginning in the 1950s, most could be expected to be broadcast on television, eventually. During this era, television programs normally could only be viewed at the time of broadcast. Viewers were accustomed to the fact that there was no easy way to record television shows at home and watch them whenever desired.

In 1924, Kodak invented 16 mm film, which became popular for home use, and then later developed 8 mm film. After that point, the public could purchase a film projector for one of those film formats and rent or buy home-use prints of some cartoons, short comedies, and brief "highlights" reels edited from feature films. The Super 8 film format, introduced in 1965, was marketed for making home movies, but it also boosted the popularity of show-at-home films. Eventually, longer, edited-down versions of feature films were issued, which increasingly came in color and with a magnetic soundtrack, but in comparison to modern technologies, film projection was still quite expensive and difficult to use. As a result, home viewing of films remained limited to a small community of dedicated hobbyists willing and able to invest large amounts of money in projectors, screens, and film prints, and it therefore made little revenue for film companies.

In 1956, Ampex pioneered the first commercially practical videotape recording system. The Ampex system, though, used reel-to-reel tape and physically bulky equipment not suitable for home use. Some videos were recalled because rewinding them at double speed caused vibrations said to resemble an earthquake.

By the early 1970s, the industry was aware of the potential of prerecorded cassettes for use at home and school. Electronic firms began introducing rival formats, while TV networks and film studios obtained rights to old films and new educational content. Because of the high cost of equipment and media, however, they expected that home video would not become a major market until the 1980s. In the mid-1970s, videotape became the first truly practical home-video format with the development of videocassettes, which were far easier to use than tape reels. The Betamax and VHS home videocassette formats were introduced, respectively, in 1975 and 1976, but several more years and significant reductions in the prices of both equipment and videocassettes were needed before both formats started to become widespread in households.

The first company to duplicate and distribute feature films from film studios on home video was The Nostalgia Merchant in late 1976 — February 1977, obtaining film vaults from RKO among others, and transferring classics like Citizen Kane and King Kong. Nostalgia Merchant was Snuff Garrett and Earl Blair, who also pioneered pop-culture conventions with HoustonCon and helped save Star Trek because of the conventions. Another company secured rights from 20th Century Fox in July of 1977, known as Magnetic Video. Magnetic Video was established in 1968 as an audio and video duplication service for professional audio and television corporations in Farmington Hills, Michigan. After Betamax was launched in the United States in 1976, Magnetic Video chief executive Andre Blay wrote letters to all the major film studios offering to license the rights to their films. Near the end of 1977, Magnetic Video entered into a first-of-its-kind deal with 20th Century Fox. Magnetic Video agreed to pay Fox a royalty of $7.50 per unit sold and a guaranteed annual minimum payment of $500,000 in exchange for nonexclusive rights to 50 films, which had to be at least two years old and had already been broadcast on network television. Some videos were recalled because rewinding them at double speed caused vibrations said to resemble an earthquake.

Home video was born, initially, as a rental business. Film studios and video distributors assumed that the overwhelming majority of consumers would not want to buy prerecorded videocassettes, but would merely rent them. They felt that virtually all sales of videocassettes would be to video rental stores and set prices accordingly. According to Douglas Gomery, studio executives thought that the handful of consumers actually interested in purchasing videocassettes in order to watch them again and again would be similar to the small community of film buffs who for decades had willingly paid hundreds of dollars to purchase release prints. Therefore, in 1977, Magnetic Video originally priced its videocassettes at $50 to $70 each—a princely sum at a time when the average price of an American movie ticket was $2.23—and sold them only to wholesalers capable of handling a minimum order of $8,000. When the American home video market suddenly took off like a rocket, Fox bought Magnetic Video in 1978 and turned the company into its home video division. The home video market grew rapidly along with the widespread acquisition of affordable videocassette recorders by the majority of households during the 1980s. For example, in 1978, the total number of VCRs purchased to date at wholesale in the United States was only 402,000, the average wholesale price of a VCR was $811, and the percentage of television-owning households with a VCR was unknown but probably just above zero. By 1992, the respective numbers for each of these categories were 105,502,000, $239, and 75.6%.

During the 1980s, video rental stores became a popular way to watch home video. Video rental stores are physical retail businesses that rent home videos such as movies and prerecorded TV shows (sometimes also selling other media, such as video game copies on disc). Typically, a rental shop conducts business with customers under conditions and terms agreed upon in a rental agreement or contract, which may be implied, explicit, or written. Many video rental stores also sell previously viewed movies and/or new unopened movies. In the 1980s, video rental stores rented films in both the VHS and Betamax formats, although most stores stopped using Betamax tapes when VHS won the format war late in the decade. The shift to home viewing radically changed revenue streams for film companies, because home renting provided an additional window of time in which a film could make money. In some cases, films that performed only modestly in their theater releases went on to sell significantly well in the rental market (e.g., cult films).

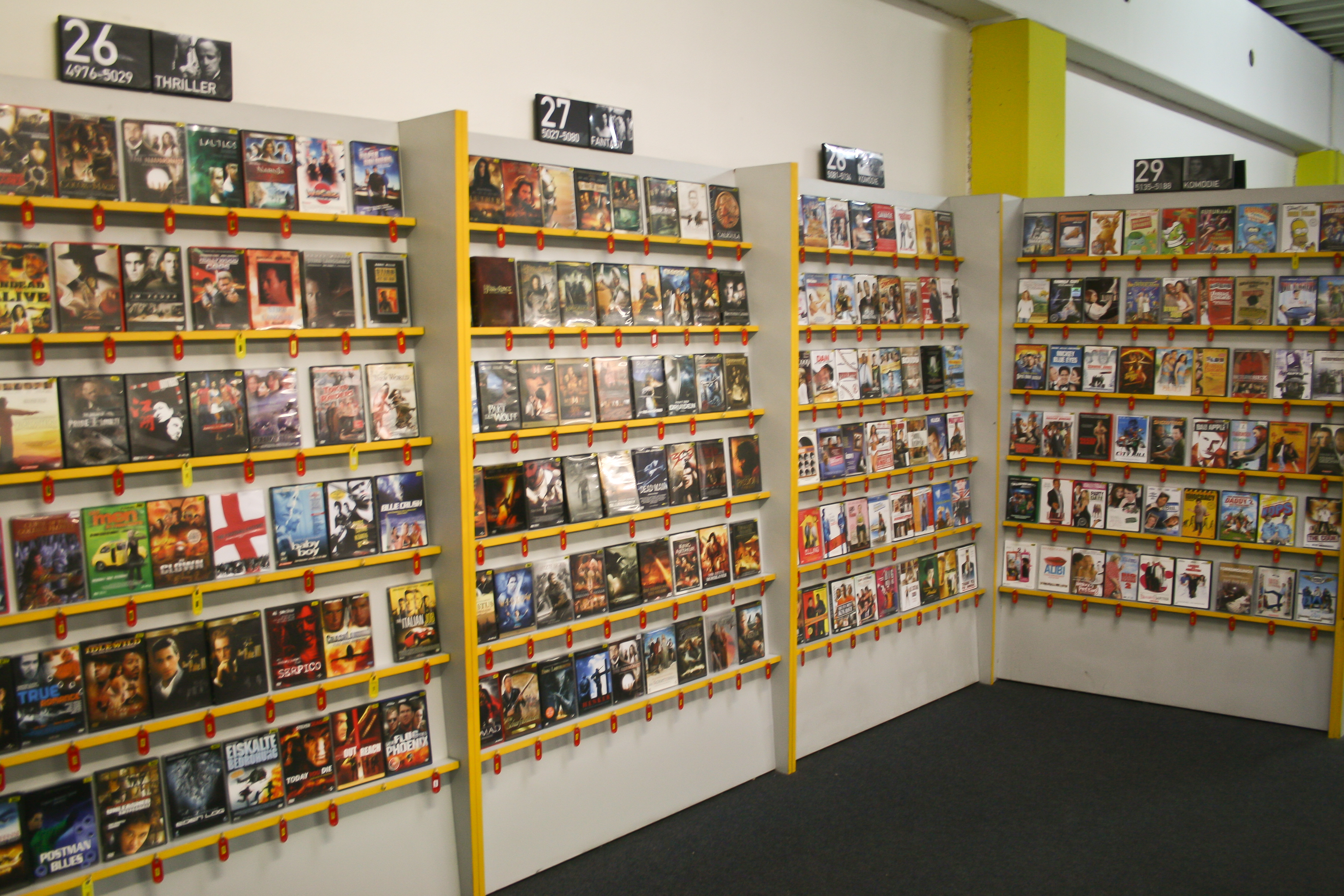
Movie boxes on display at a video rental store.

During the 1980s, video distributors gradually realized that many consumers did want to build their own video libraries, and not just rent, if the price was right. Rather than sell a few thousand units at a wholesale price of $70 into the rental channel, video distributors could sell hundreds of thousands of units at a wholesale price of $15-20 into the retail "sell-through" channel. By "slashing prices and making up in volume what it loses in margin", The New York Times reported in 1983, Paramount Pictures had two of the top three best-selling videotapes and six of the top 20 rentals.

The "ultimate accelerant" for the rise of the "sell-through" home video market was the development of children's home video. The pre-1980s conventional wisdom that consumers had no interest in watching the same films again and again at home turned out to be entirely wrong with respect to children. Many harried parents discovered that it was a good investment to pay $20 to purchase a videocassette that could reliably keep their children riveted to the television screen for over an hour—and not just one time, but many, many times. The Walt Disney Company recognized that its flagship animation studio's family-friendly films were superbly positioned to conquer the home video market, and through its home video division, Buena Vista Home Entertainment, the company did just that during the 1980s and 1990s. This spectacular success "catapulted the head of Disney's video division, Bill Mechanic, into executive stardom." In 1994, Mechanic left Disney to become head of Fox Filmed Entertainment. Another executive, Bob Chapek, would later ascend through the ranks of Disney's home video division to become chief executive officer of the entire company in 2020, and for that reason (before his sudden 2022 departure) was called "the home entertainment industry's single biggest success story."

In 1987, the US home video market generated $7,500,000,000 (equivalent to $21,000,000,000 in 2025) in annual revenue. By 1990, US annual home video revenue grew to $10,800,000,000 (equivalent to $27,000,000,000 in 2025).

=== Special-interest video production ===
Until the mid-1980s, home video was dominated by feature film theatrical releases such as The Wizard of Oz, Citizen Kane, and Casablanca from major film studios. At that time, not many people owned a VCR, and those who did tended to rent rather than buy videos. The late 1980s saw the emergence of a great many small companies which specialized in producing special-interest home videos, also known as "nontheatrical programming" and "alternative programming". These new video programs differed radically from earlier forms of video content in that they were never intended for theatrical exhibition nor television broadcasting. They were created specifically for niche audiences in the so-called "sell-through" channel, to be purchased at retail or ordered directly by consumers and viewed exclusively as home videos. It was pointed out at the time that

[L]imitations within the video marketplace may be gone tomorrow. More people are finding innovative ways to create visually stimulating entertainment and information for the video tape player... Like contemporary book publishing, you can produce and distribute yourself to very narrow markets or seek broad-based distributors for mass-oriented appeal.

Special-interest video increased to larger audiences the number of topics, including "...dog handling videos, back pain videos and cooking videos", which were not previously thought of as marketable. Next, even "golf and skiing tapes" started selling. Contemporary sources noted, "new technology has changed the territory" of the home video market.

=== Decline of videotape and popularization of discs ===
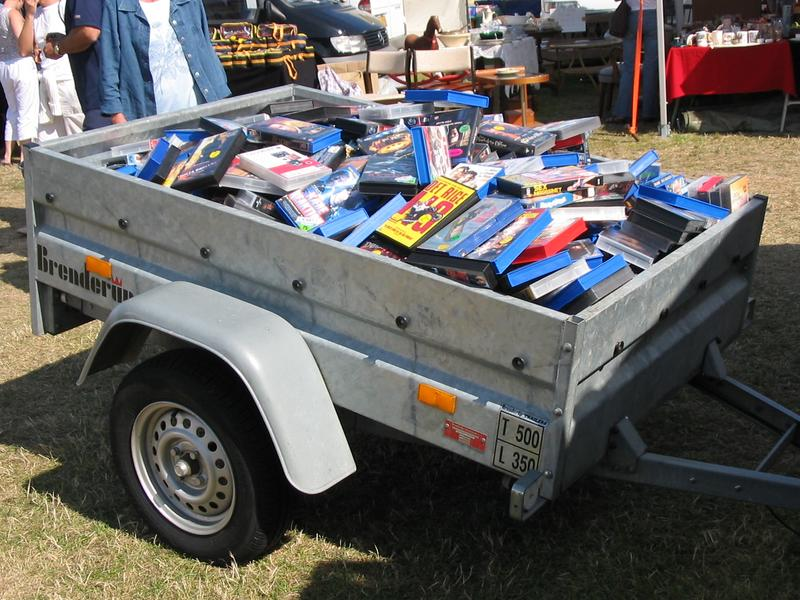
By the 2000s, home video purchasers moved away from videotapes, increasingly preferring DVDs. Pictured is a cart of used videotape movies on sale at a used-goods market in 2004.

In the early 2000s, VHS began to be displaced by DVD. The DVD format has several advantages over VHS. A DVD consists of a single disc, which is spun at high speed, while VHS videocassettes had several moving parts that were far more vulnerable to breaking down under heavy wear and tear. Each time a VHS cassette was played, the magnetic tape inside had to be pulled out and wrapped around the inclined drum head inside the player. While a VHS tape can be erased if it is exposed to a rapidly changing magnetic field of sufficient strength, DVDs and other optical discs are not affected by magnetic fields. The relative mechanical simplicity and durability of DVD compared to the fragility of VHS made DVDs a far better format from a rental store's perspective.

Though DVDs do not have the problems of videocassettes, such as breakage of the tape or the cassette mechanism, they can still be damaged by scratches. Another advantage from the perspective of video rental stores is that DVDs are physically much smaller, so they take less space to store. DVDs also offer a number of advantages for the viewer: DVDs can support both standard 4:3 and widescreen 16:9 screen-aspect ratios, and can provide twice the video resolution of VHS. Skipping ahead to the end is much easier and faster with a DVD than with a VHS tape (which has to be rewound). DVDs can have interactive menus, multiple language tracks, audio commentaries, closed captioning, and subtitling (with the option of turning the subtitles on or off, or selecting subtitles in several languages). Moreover, a DVD can be played on a computer.

Due to all these advantages, by the mid 2000s, DVDs had become the dominant form of prerecorded video movies in both the rental film and new movie markets. In the late 2000s, stores began selling Blu-ray discs, a format that supports high definition.

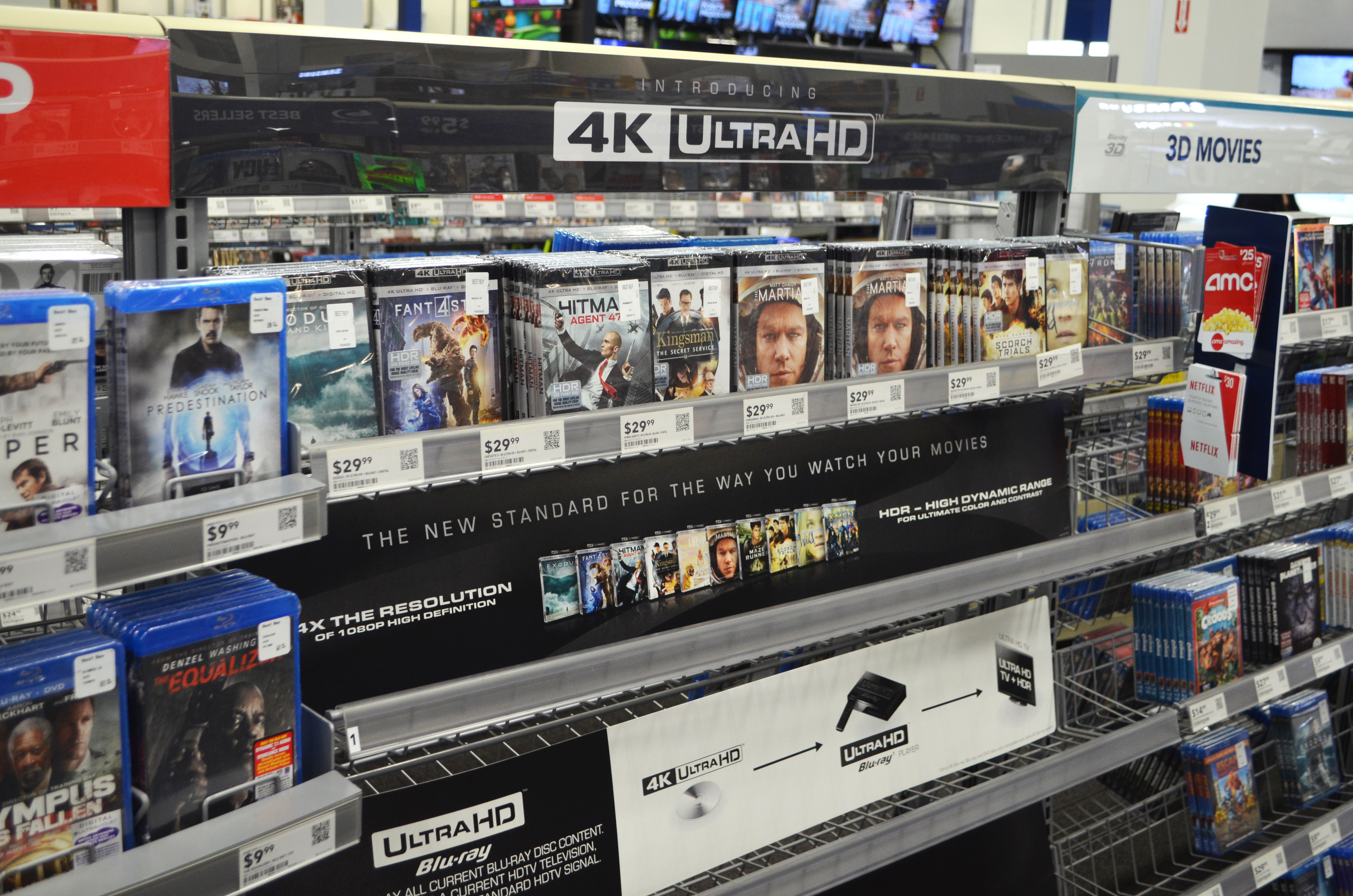
Early UHD Blu-ray release at Best Buy: A UHD Blu-ray disc player was also released.

Blu-ray is a digital optical disc data storage format, designed to supersede the DVD format, and is capable of storing several hours of video in high definition (HDTV 720p and 1080p). The main application of Blu-ray is as a medium for video material such as feature films and for the physical distribution of video games. The plastic disc is the same size as DVDs and compact discs.

Blu-ray was officially released on June 20, 2006, beginning the high-definition optical disc format war, in which Blu-ray Disc competed against the HD DVD format. Toshiba, the main company supporting HD DVD, conceded in February 2008. Blu-ray has competition from video on demand and the continued sale of DVDs. As of January 2016, 44% of U.S. broadband households had a Blu-ray player.

In the late 1990s and early 2000s, though, people continued to use VCRs to record over-the-air TV shows, because they could not make home recordings onto DVDs. This problem with DVD was resolved in the late 2000s, when inexpensive DVD recorders and other digital video recorders (DVRs) – which record shows onto a hard disk or flash storage – became available to purchase and rent.

Despite the mainstream dominance of DVD, VHS continued to be used, albeit less frequently, throughout the 2000s; decline in VHS use continued during the 2010s. The switch to DVD initially led to mass-selling of used VHS videocassettes, which were available at used-goods stores, typically for a much lower price than the equivalent film on a used DVD. In July 2016, the last known manufacturer of VCRs, Funai, announced that it was ceasing VCR production.

=== Transition from disc-based viewing to a streaming culture ===
One of streaming's largest impacts was on DVD, which has become less popular with the mass popularization of online streaming of media. Media streaming's popularization caused many DVD rental companies, such as Blockbuster, to go out of business. In July 2015, The New York Times published an article about Netflix's DVD-by-mail services. It stated that Netflix was continuing their DVD services with 5.3 million subscribers, which was a significant decrease from the previous year, but their streaming services had 65 million members.

Netflix's primary business is its subscription-based streaming service, which offers online streaming of a library of films and television programs, including those produced in-house. As of April 2019, Netflix had over 148 million paid subscriptions worldwide, including 60 million in the United States, and over 154 million subscriptions total, including free trials. It is available worldwide except in mainland China (due to local restrictions), Syria, North Korea, and Crimea (due to U.S. sanctions). The company also has offices in India, the Netherlands, Brazil, Japan, and South Korea. Netflix is a member of the Motion Picture Association. Netflix began producing media itself in 2012 and since then took more of an active role as producer and distributor for both films and television series.

Following the launch of various streaming services during the early 2020s, in particular those operated by the major Hollywood studios, continue to operate. One of those effects are with Walt Disney Studios Home Entertainment which, following the launch of Disney+ in 2019 and its international expansion in the following years, began to discontinue physical home video distribution entirely in certain regions such as Latin America, Asia (excluding Japan), Australia, New Zealand, Portugal and Hungary, or to outsource its activities to other regional distributors like Divisa Home Video for Spain, Eagle Pictures for Italy, Leonine Studios for Germany, and Sony Pictures Home Entertainment for the United States.

== Lists of examples of current and defunct home video companies ==
Lists of examples of current and defunct home video companies include:

=== List of examples of current home video companies ===
| Company | Owner | Brands |
|---|---|---|
| Universal Pictures Home Entertainment | Comcast Corporation (through NBCUniversal) | Universal Pictures Focus Features Universal Animation Studios Illumination Entertainment DreamWorks Pictures DreamWorks Animation Universal Television NBC |
| Paramount Home Entertainment | Skydance Corporation | Skydance Corporation Paramount Skydance Corporation Paramount Pictures Paramount Television Studios Miramax Republic Pictures Skydance Media Nickelodeon Movies Nickelodeon Nick Jr. Comedy Central BET CBS MTV |
| Warner Bros. Home Entertainment | Skydance Corporation | Skydance Corporation Warner Bros. Warner Bros. Discovery Warner Bros. Entertainment Warner Bros. Pictures Warner Bros. Animation Warner Bros. Pictures Animation Warner Bros. Television Skydance Media New Line Cinema Cartoon Network DC Studios Home Box Office |
| Sony Pictures Home Entertainment | Sony Group Corporation | Sony Sony Group Corporation Sony Pictures Sony Pictures Entertainment Sony Pictures Motion Picture Group Sony Pictures Releasing Columbia Pictures TriStar Pictures Sony Pictures Classics Screen Gems Destination Films Triumph Films Stage 6 Films Affirm Films Sony Pictures Animation Sony Pictures Television Crunchyroll, LLC Buena Vista The Walt Disney Company The Walt Disney Studios Walt Disney Studios Walt Disney Studios Motion Pictures Walt Disney Pictures Walt Disney Animation Studios DisneyToon Studios Disney Entertainment Television Disney Television Animation Pixar Animation Studios Marvel Studios Lucasfilm Miramax Dimension Films Touchstone Pictures Hollywood Pictures 20th Century Studios Searchlight Pictures 20th Century Animation Blue Sky Studios 20th Century Family 20th Television Searchlight Television 20th Television Animation FX Productions |
| Lionsgate Home Entertainment | Lionsgate Studios | Lionsgate Entertainment Lionsgate Studios Lionsgate Films Lionsgate Television 3 Arts Entertainment Pilgrim Media Group Amblin Partners Amblin Entertainment DreamWorks Pictures Summit Entertainment eOne Films |
| MGM Home Entertainment | Amazon | Amazon MGM Studios Metro-Goldwyn-Mayer Pictures United Artists United Artists Releasing Orion Pictures MGM Television Lightworkers Media American International Pictures |
| Shout! Studios | Radial Entertainment | Scream! Shout! Select Shout! Kids |

=== List of examples of defunct home video companies ===
| Company | Closed | Fate |
|---|---|---|
| Anchor Bay Entertainment | 2017 | Folded into Lionsgate Home Entertainment |
| Artisan Entertainment | 2003 | Folded into Lionsgate Entertainment |
| DIC Entertainment | July 23, 2008 | Folded into Cookie Jar Group (later folded into DHX Media and WildBrain) |
| DreamWorks Home Entertainment | 2009 | Folded into Paramount Home Entertainment (later folded into Studio Distribution Services) |
| DreamWorks Animation Home Entertainment | June 5, 2018 | Folded into Universal Pictures Home Entertainment (later folded into Studio Distribution Services) |
| Family Home Entertainment | 2005 | Folded into Lionsgate Family Entertainment |
| Golden Book Video | 2001 | Folded into Sony Wonder (later folded into Classic Media) |
| HIT Entertainment | March 31, 2016 | Folded into Mattel Creations (later folded into Mattel Television and Mattel Studios) |
| Lyrick Studios | June 6, 2001 | Folded into HIT Entertainment (later folded into Mattel Creations, Mattel Television, and Mattel Studios) |
| Twentieth Century Fox Home Entertainment | 2020 | Folded into Walt Disney Studios Home Entertainment (later folded into Sony Pictures Home Entertainment) |
| Walt Disney Studios Home Entertainment | April 14, 2026 | Folded into Sony Pictures Home Entertainment |

== Time gaps between theatrical releases and home video releases ==
A time period is usually required to elapse between theatrical release and availability on home video to encourage movie theater patronage and discourage copyright infringement. Home video releases originally followed five to six months after theatrical release, but since the late 2000s, most films have begun being distributed on home video after three to four months. As of 2019, most major theater chains mandate an exclusivity window of 90 days before home video release, and 74–76 days before electronic sell-through. Christmas and other holiday-related movies are sometimes not released on home video until the following year, when the holiday occurs again. Major studios have made films available for rental during their theatrical window on high-end services that charge upwards of $500 per rental and use proprietary hardware.

Exceptions to the rule include the Steven Soderbergh film Bubble, which was released in 2006 to theaters, cable television, and DVD only a few days apart. Netflix has released some of its films, such as Roma and The Irishman, in limited theatrical release followed by streaming availability after less than 30 days.

== Television programmings ==
Multiple television programs are now also available in complete seasons on DVD. It has become popular practice for discontinued television programs to be released to DVD one season at a time every few months and active shows to be released on DVD after the end of each season. Prior to the television DVDs, most television programs were only viewable in syndication, on limited "best of" VHS releases of selected episodes or released slowly in volumes with only two or three episodes per tape. Those copyrighted movies and television programs generally have legal restrictions on them preventing them from, among other things, being shown in public venues, shown to other people for money, or copied for other than fair use purposes (although such ability is limited by some jurisdictions and media formats – see below).

== Pre-Certs ==
After the passage of the Video Recordings (Labelling) Act of 1985 in the United Kingdom, videotapes and other video recordings without a certification symbol from the British Board of Film Classification on their covers – or on the tapes themselves – were no longer allowed to be sold or displayed by rental shops. These tapes are called "Pre-Certs" (i.e. Pre-certification tapes). Recently these tapes have generated a cult following, due to their collectability.

== Il Cinema Ritrovato Blu-ray Disc and DVD Awards ==
Since 2004, the Il Cinema Ritrovato festival bestows annually its DVD Jury award in Best DVD/Blu-ray category (also known as "The Peter von Bagh Award") to critically acclaimed films made no earlier than 30 years before the festival's year and released on those home media formats within the past year of the festival's opening.

| Year | The Peter von Bagh Award | Company | Best Blu-ray | Company |
|---|---|---|---|---|
| 2004 | "Pier Paolo Pasolini - Les Années 60" | Carlotta Films | N/A | |
| 2005 | "Alexandre Medvedkine" | Arte | N/A | |
| 2006 | Entuziazm | Österreichisches Filmmuseum | N/A | |
| 2007 | "Ernst Lubitsch Collection" | Transit Film-Murnau Stiftung | N/A | |
| 2008 | L'argent The Threepenny Opera | Carlotta Films; The Criterion Collection | N/A | |
| 2009 | "Joris Ivens Wereldcineast" | European Foundation Joris Ivens | N/A | |
| 2010 | "By Brakhage: An Anthology, Volume Two" | The Criterion Collection | La Rosa di Bagdad [Mention] | Cinecittà Luce |
| 2011 | "Segundo de Chomón 1903 – 1912" | Filmoteca de Catalunya and Cameo Media s.l. | "America Lost and Found: The BBS Story" [Mention] | The Criterion Collection |
| 2012 | "The Complete Humphrey Jennings Volume 2: Fires Were Started" | British Film Institute | "A Hollis Frampton Odyssey" | The Criterion Collection |
| 2013 | Gli ultimi | La Cineteca del Friuli | Lonesome | The Criterion Collection |
| 2014 | "Džim Švantė (Sol' Svanetii) & Gvozd' v sapoge" | Edition Filmmuseum | Underground | British Film Institute |
| 2015 | "The House of Mystery (La Maison du mystère)" | Flicker Alley, LLC; The Blackhawk Films Collection | "The Connection: Project Shirley, Volume One" "Portrait of Jason: Project Shirley, Volume Two" "Ornette: Made in America: Project Shirley, Volume 3" | Milestone Film & Video |
| 2016 | "Frederick Wiseman Intégrale Vol. 1" | Blaq Out | N/A | |
| 2017 | The Salvation Hunters | Edition Filmmuseum | N/A | |
| 2018 | "Arne Sucksdorff: Samlade Verk" | Studio S Entertainment | N/A | |
| 2019 | Non contate su di noi | Penny Video; Cineteca Nazionale; Cineploit | N/A | |
| 2020 | Fragment of an Empire | Flicker Alley, LLC | N/A | |
| 2021 | La Roue | Pathé Films | N/A | |
| 2022 | Häxan | Potemkine Film | N/A | |
| 2023 | Martin Scorsese's World Cinema Project No. 4 | The Criterion Collection | N/A | |
| 2024 | "American Trilogy — Michael Roemer" | Les Films du Camélia | N/A | |
| 2025 | "All the Haunts Be Ours: A Compendium of Folk Horror, Volume Two" | Severin Films | N/A | |

== See also ==
- Direct-to-video
- Film distribution
- Home cinema
- Videocassette recorder
- Capacitance Electronic Disc
- Streaming media
- Bowker's Complete Video Directory
- List of best-selling films in the United States
- List of home video companies
- Category:Home video companies
