= Letter Never Sent (film) =

1960 film

- Theatrical poster
- Directed by: Mikhail Kalatozov
- Written by: Grigory Koltunov; Valery Osipov; Viktor Rozov
- Starring: Innokenty Smoktunovsky; Tatiana Samoilova; Vasily Livanov; Yevgeni Urbansky
- Cinematography: Sergey Urusevsky
- Edited by: N. Anikina
- Music by: Nikolai Kryukov
- Release date: 27 June 1960
- Running time: 97 minutes
- Country: Soviet Union
- Language: Russian

Letter Never Sent (Russian: Неотправленное письмо, translit. Neotpravlennoye pismo, sometimes translated as The Unsent Letter or The Unmailed Letter) is a 1960 Soviet adventure drama film directed by Mikhail Kalatozov and starring Tatiana Samoilova. It was entered into the 1960 Cannes Film Festival, but was withdrawn just before the screening on 17 May; according to the Soviet representatives, the film was "unfinished" (as a matter of fact, Kalatozov wanted to re-shoot some sequences before the premiere in the USSR).

The film was shot in black-and-white with a 4:3 aspect ratio and monaural sound. It was Kalatozov's follow-up to perhaps his most lauded film, The Cranes Are Flying, which also starred Samoilova.

== Plot ==
A guide, Sergei, and three geologists—Tanya, Andrei, and Konstantin Sabinin—are brought by plane to the boreal forest of central Siberia to search for diamonds. During the plane ride, Konstantin begins writing a letter to his wife detailing his feelings about the expedition. Early on in their search, Sergei expresses jealousy toward Andrei, who is the object of Tanya's affection. Tensions rise between the two while bird hunting for food, resulting in Sergei punching Andrei in the face.

After failing to find diamonds while panning in rivers, the group begin a protracted job excavating on a mountainside with pickaxes. When they have reached the point of complete exhaustion, Tanya finally spots diamonds in the earth, leading the group to carry on a rapturous celebration. Andrei uses his radio to inform the base camp in Petrov about the discovery, and the group prepare to return to civilization, packing their supplies in their canoe. In the middle of the night, they awaken to find themselves in the midst of a forest fire. Sergei attempts to obtain some of the supplies packed in the canoe but is killed when a burning tree falls on him.

Using his radio, Andrei contacts the Petrov base camp, but the receivers are unable to hear them; they merely congratulate the group on their discovery, as well as its significance for the Soviet Union, informing them that they have received a congratulatory telegram from Moscow. Shortly after, the trio receive a message via radio that search parties have begun looking for them. An aircraft dispatched to search for them flies overhead, but they are unable to get its attention.

The group presses on but is forced to carry an injured Andrei on a makeshift gurney. Andrei, feeling himself to be a burden, begs Konstantin and Tanya to abandon him, but they refuse. Upon waking one morning, Konstantin and Tanya find that Andrei has disappeared, devastating Tanya. Konstantin and Tanya press on, encountering another plane overhead, but again are unable to get the pilot's attention. Defeated, the two lie down on a hillside to rest, and awaken covered in snow. As the weather conditions worsen, Tanya eventually succumbs to the elements, leaving Konstantin alone.

Still determined, Konstantin uses a makeshift raft to float down the frozen river. En route, he has a vision of himself returning to safety, greeted by his wife Vera and their son. Konstantin eventually loses consciousness, and his raft drifts into a snowbank on the river. Shortly after, searchers in a helicopter spot him lying in the snow, and descend upon the river. They initially presume him dead, but while they listen for his heartbeat with a stethoscope, he slowly opens his eyes.

== Cast ==
- Innokenty Smoktunovsky as Konstantin Fyodorovich Sabinin
- Tatiana Samoilova as Tanya
- Vasily Livanov as Andrei
- Yevgeni Urbansky as Sergei Stepanovich
- Galina Kozhakina as Vera

== Production ==
The film was shot in icy rivers amidst fires, with burning trees falling in front of the cast and crew. During the filming of one scene on the Yenisei river, Smoktunovsky was concussed by the rocky waters whilst on a raft. Attached to a larger boat by a rope, Smoktunovsky was told to raise his hand if he felt unwell, which he did almost immediately. Despite this, Urusevsky and Kalatozov continued to film the scene for a few more minutes. After being lifted from the raft, the crew noticed his concussion, and Smoktunovsky was carried in Yevgeni Urbansky's arms.

== Reception ==
On the review aggregator website Rotten Tomatoes, 83% of 6 critics' reviews are positive. Additionally, the film was nominated for the Palme d'Or at the 1960 Cannes Film Festival.

== Home video ==
Criterion Collection released the film in DVD and Blu-ray Disc as Letter Never Sent. According to Jaime N. Christley of Slant Magazine, having started with "pristine materials", "Criterion's blue-ribbon authoring is, of course, flawless, as is their uncompressed monaural track, which is as dense with human lamentations as mother nature's libidinous, murderous roar." Christley notes that the "bare-bones single disc" is accompanied only by an essay by film scholar Dina Iordanova, who "does a fine job establishing the film's historical context." In 2020, Mosfilm released a digital restoration of the film.
