= Sergey Urusevsky =

Soviet cinematographer and film director (1908-1974)

Sergey Pavlovich Urusevsky (Russian: Серге́й Павлович Урусевский) (23 December 1908, Saint Petersburg, Russian Empire - 12 November 1974, Moscow, Soviet Union) was a Soviet cinematographer and film director, renowned for his work with Grigori Chukhrai, Mikhail Kalatozov and Yuli Raizman. His subjective camera style in I Am Cuba and The Cranes Are Flying is regarded as one of the best of all time, winning him several awards throughout his career. Urusevsky's work draws influence from Eduard Tisse, the cinematographer known for his work with Sergei Eisenstein.

== Early life ==
Sergey Urusevsky (also styled Sergei Urusevskii) has always been interested in graphic design and photography. He graduated from the Leningrad Art Industrial High School in 1929. The school is now more aptly named the Saint Petersburg Art and Industry Academy and soon after graduating, he attended the Imperial Academy of Arts and graduated in 1937. He was very candid in his admiration for Pablo Picasso and was even sent ceramic paintings from the esteemed artist. In 1946, Urusevsky became a member of the Communist Party of the Soviet Union and continued to be pro-communist for the entirety of his life.

== Career ==
During the 1930s, he began early work as a cinematographer and in 1937 he began work at the Gorky Film Studio. The film studio is well known for have producing the first Soviet sound film Road to Life and for producing the first Soviet color film Grunya Kurnakova. During the Great Patriotic War, Urusevsky was a frontline cameraman and filmed much of the war on the Eastern Front. It was during the war when he realized that being a cameraman was his vocation.

Shortly after the war ended, Urusevsky became a cinematographer and worked closely with Mark Donskoy on The Village Teacher, and Alitet Leaves for the Hills. Both films were shot in the snowy Siberian wilds. In 1950 he began work with Mosfilm Studios, the oldest and largest film studio in Europe. It was during his time with Mosfilm that he collaborated with the likes of directors Yuli Raizman and Mikhail Kalatozov. In a span of 6 years he helped create 5 different films and his best work was soon to follow.

=== The Cranes Are Flying ===
In 1957, Urusevsky worked with Mikhail Kalatozov on The Cranes Are Flying. The film received international recognition and was awarded the Palme d'Or, the highest prize at the 1958 Cannes Film Festival. The film was praised for the emotive camera style and the way it told the stories of everyday people during the Great Patriotic War. The Cranes Are Flying casts the beautiful Russian actress Tatiana Samoilova and actor Aleksey Batalov. The film sometimes featured hand-held camera shots, especially the scene where Tatiana runs away in a moment of distress. She was asked to film herself while running with the hand-held camera. The movie changed the way that Russian citizens viewed heroines throughout the course of Russian film history.

=== I am Cuba (Soy Cuba) ===
As a much more art oriented film, Soy Cuba initially was not well praised by the masses. The Cuban audience didn't appreciate the movie, stating that it showed stereotypes that simply were not true. For the Russians, it wasn't revolutionary enough and also contained too much compassion for the lives of the Cuban bourgeoisie. In 1995, shortly after the fall of the Soviet Union, the movie was released in the United States. Film lovers in the U.S. adored the art aspect of the film and the tracking shots used by Urusevsky. Famous Hollywood director Martin Scorsese even had the film restored for audiences in the United States. The film won the Archival Award from the National Society of Film Critics upon its re-release in 1995. Soy Cuba was also shown at the 2003 Cannes Film Festival.

=== As a director ===
Sergey Urusevsky directed and released two of his own films: Beg inokhodtsa in 1969 and Sing Your Song, Poet in 1971. The latter was produced just months before his death in 1974.

== Filmography ==
- Duel (1945); directed by Vladimir Legoshin
- Sinegoria (1946); directed by Erast Garin and Khesya Lokshina
- The Village Teacher (1947); directed by Mark Donskoy
- Alitet Leaves for the Hills (1949); directed by Mark Donskoy
- Dream of a Cossack (1951); directed by Yuli Raizman
- The Return of Vasili Bortnikov (1953); directed by Vsevolod Pudovkin
- The First Echelon (1955); directed by Mikhail Kalatozov
- Lesson of Life (1955); directed by Yuli Raizman
- The Forty-First (1956); directed by Grigori Chukhray
- The Cranes Are Flying (1957); directed by Mikhail Kalatozov
- The Unsent Letter (1960); directed by Mikhail Kalatozov
- I Am Cuba (1964); directed by Mikhail Kalatozov
- Beg inokhodtsa (1968); directed by Sergey Urusevsky
- Sing Your Song, Poet (1973); directed by Sergey Urusevsky

== Accomplishments and awards ==
- Special Award, Cannes Film Festival for The Cranes Are Flying, 1957
- Palme d'Or, Cannes Film Festival for The Cranes Are Flying, 1958
- Archival Award, NSFC for Soy Cuba, 1995
- Honored Art Worker, RSFSR, 1951
- State Prize, USSR, 1948, 1952

== External links and References ==
- Sergey Urusevsky at IMDb
- 1. http://www.filmreference.com/Writers-and-Production-Artists-Ta-Vi/Urusevsky-Sergei.html
- 2. Great Soviet Encyclopedia
- 3. http://russia-ic.com/people/general/u/629
- 4. https://wbis.degruyter.com/biographic-document/US90219
