= Viktor Rozov =

Soviet and Russian dramatist and screenwriter

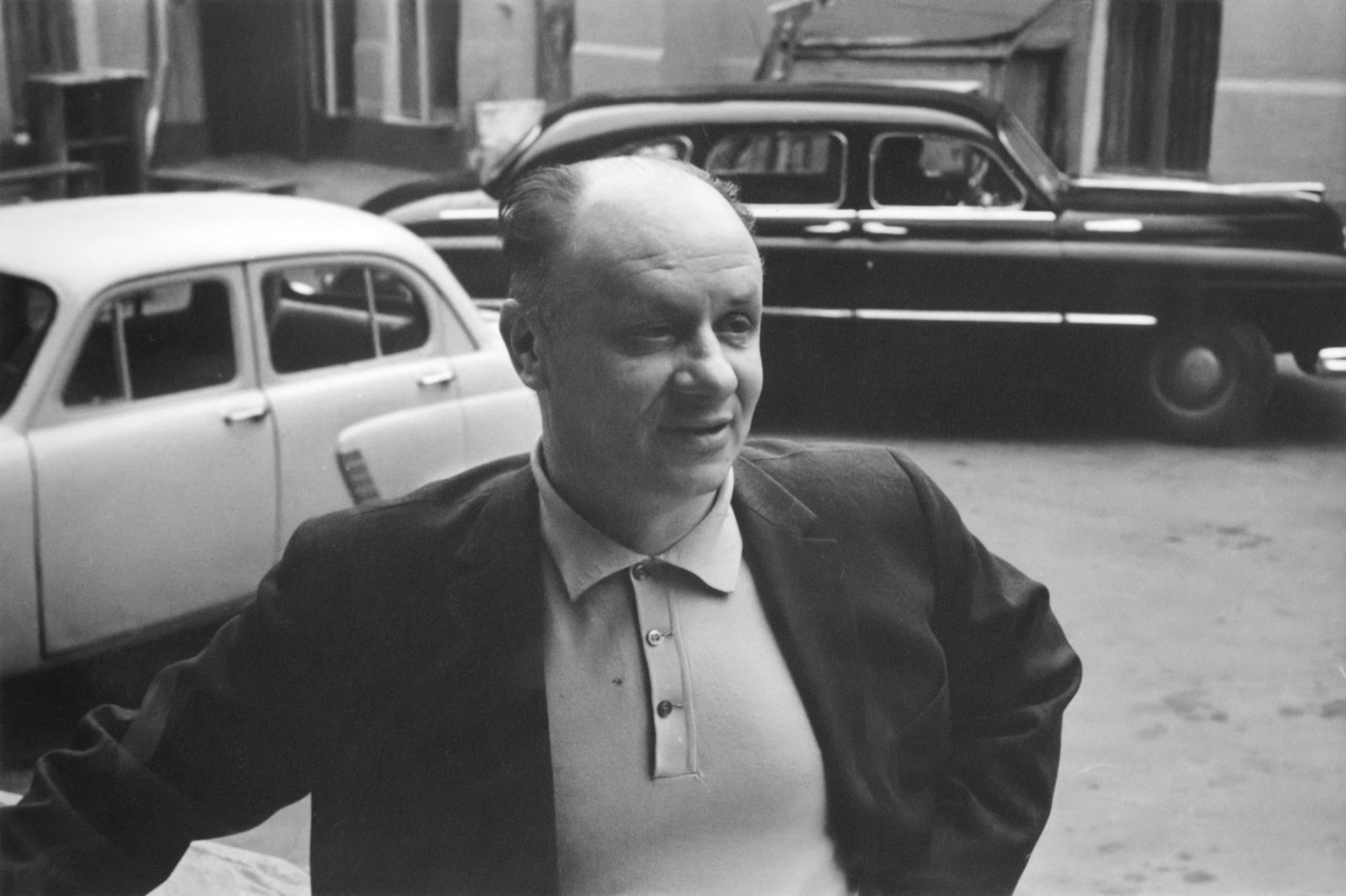
- Born: Viktor Sergeyevich Rozov; 21 August 1913 Yaroslavl, Russian Empire
- Died: 28 September 2004 (aged 91) Moscow, Russia
- Occupation: Playwright, screenwriter
- Years active: 1943–1996

Viktor Sergeyevich Rozov (Russian: Виктор Сергеевич Розов; 21 August 1913, Yaroslavl – 28 September 2004, Moscow) was a Soviet and Russian dramatist and screenwriter. He wrote more than 20 dramatic pieces and 6 film scripts, including Вечно живые/Alive Forever, the basis for his film script The Cranes Are Flying. He was a member of the Russian Academy of Letters, and was the president of the Russian Institute of Theatre Arts and a member of the Union of Soviet Writers.

== Biography ==
Viktor Rozov was the son of accountant Sergei Fyodorovich Rozov (a soldier who fought in World War I) and Yekaterina Ilyinichna. During the Yaroslavl rebellion in 1918, the family home was burned, forcing the family to move to Vetluga. It was there that Viktor completed three years of primary education. From 1923, he lived and studied in Kostroma. In 1929, he failed the entrance exams at the Russian State University of Agriculture in Moscow and started working in a textile factory in Kostroma. That same year, he became a regular actor and spectator of Kostroma's youth theater. In 1932 he entered the Technical School in Kostroma. In 1934, he entered the Theatre of Revolution School in Moscow (under the direction of Maria Babanova).

After the entry into war of the Soviet Union in June 1941, Rozov joined the 8th National Division Popular militia in the Krasnopresnenskaya district. In the autumn of that year, he was seriously injured. He left hospital in mid-1942, and led a propaganda group at the front; at the same time, he took correspondence courses at the Maxim Gorky Literature Institute. At the end of the war, he interrupted his studies at the institute and founded the Theatre for children and youth of Almaty. Returning to Moscow, he worked as an actor and director at the Theatre of the Central House of Railway Culture. In 1953, Rozov completed his studies at the Institute of Literature.

From 1949, his plays have been staged in various theatres. His play Friends, presented in 1949 at the Central Youth Theatreh failed to see the light because it was considered "too sentimental". Director Anatoly Efros directed Rozov's "Well and good!", "Finding Joy", "The Wedding Day" and "Before Dinner"), with Oleg Yefremov. Mikhail Kalatozov's The Cranes Are Flying, was an adaptation of Rozov's "Alive Forever". He received the Palme d'Or at the 1958 Cannes Film Festival "for his humanism, his unity and his high artistic quality".

Rozov died at the age of 91 and was interred at Vagankovo Cemetery, Moscow.

== Personal life ==
Rozov married to Nadezhda Varfolomeyevna Kozlova (born 1919). He had a son, Sergei (born 1953) - a director, and a daughter, Tatiana (born 1960) – an actress at the Moscow Art Theatre.

== Works ==
=== Plays ===
- Alive Forever (Вечно живые, 1943)
- Her Friends (1949)
- The Page of Life (Your Way) (1953)
- In the Good Time! (1955)
- Finding Joy (1957)
- Freemasters (1959)
- The unequal battle (1960)
- On the Road (1962)
- Before dinner (1962)
- On the wedding day (1964)
- The inventor (1966)
- An Ordinary Story (1966, based on I. A. Goncharov's novel The Same Old Story)
- The Traditional Collection (1967)
- On the treadmill (1968)
- From evening until noon (1970)
- Boys (Brother Alyosha) (1971, based on Dostoevsky's novel The Brothers Karamazov)
- The Situation (1973)
- The Four Drops (1974)
- Riders from the station Rosa (1978, based on V. Krapivin's trilogy Malchik so shpagoi)
- The nest of the grouse (1979)
- The Host (1982)
- By the Sea (Kabanchik) (1986)
- At Home (The Return) (1989)
- Hidden spring (1989)
- Lyubkin (1991, based on N. Narokov’s novel Imaginary Values)
- Hoffman (1996)

== Filmography (screenwriter) ==
- 1956 - In Good Time!
- 1957 - The Cranes Are Flying - the screen version of the play "Life Eternal"
- 1959 - Letter Never Sent
- 1960 - Noisy Day - the film adaptation of the comedy "Finding Joy"
- 1961 - Auf der Suche nach Glück ( Germany ) - German television version of the film "Finding Joy" (1957)
- 1962 - På jakt efter lyckan “Finding Joy” (Sweden, in collaboration with Lennart Lagerval)
- 1968 - On the wedding day
- 1972 - For All the Responsibility - the film adaptation of the play "The Traditional Collection"
- 1972 - Life Page
- 1973 - In Good Time! - TV version of the play of the same name
- 1975 - To the end of the world ...
- 1980 - A Siketfajd fészke (The Grouse's Nest) ( Hungary )
- 1980 - Before dinner (TV show)
- 1981 - From evening until noon
- 1982 - A few drops (movie)
- 1987 - The Riders
- 1987 - Grouse's Nest (drama play)

== Distinctions ==
He received Russian and Soviet orders and awards, such as:

- The Order "For Merit to the Fatherland" of the III degree (5 August 1995) - for services to the state and many years of fruitful work in the field of art and culture;
- Order of the Patriotic War I degree;
- Two Orders of the Red Banner of Labour (08/19/1988);
- Order of Friendship of Peoples (1969, 08/19/1983);
- Order of the Badge of Honour (08/31/1973);
- medals of Russia and foreign countries;
- Order of Mercy (Russian Orthodox Church);
- USSR State Prize in the field of literature, art and architecture of 1967 (in the field of theatrical art) (1 November 1967) - for the play “Ordinary History” at the Sovremennik Theater in Moscow;
- Laureate of the Award of the President of the Russian Federation in the field of literature and art in 2001.
