= Tatiana Samoilova =

Soviet and Russian actress (1934–2014)

- Татьяна Самойлова
- Samoilova in Anna Karenina, 1967
- Born: Tatiana Yevgenyevna Samoilova; 4 May 1934; Leningrad, Soviet Union (modern St Petersburg, Russia)
- Died: 4 May 2014 (aged 80); Moscow, Russia
- Education: M.S. Schepkin Higher Theatre School (Institute); Russian Academy of Theatre Arts
- Occupation: Actress
- Years active: 1955–2008
- Spouse(s): Vasily Lanovoy (1955–58; divorced); Valery Osipov (1959–68; divorced); Eduard Mashkovitch (1968–73; divorced); Sol Shulman (divorced)
- Children: 1
- Parent: Yevgeny and Zinaida Samoylov

Tatiana Yevgenyevna Samoilova (Russian: Татья́на Евге́ньевна Само́йлова; 4 May 1934 – 4 May 2014) was a Soviet and Russian film actress best known for her lead role in The Cranes Are Flying (1957). She received a number of awards for the film, including a special mention at the Cannes Film Festival. Samoilova had several major roles in the 1960s before largely disappearing from public life. In 1993, she was named a People's Artist of Russia. She made a comeback in the 2000s and received a Lifetime Achievement Award at the 2007 Moscow Film Festival.

== Early life ==
The only daughter of actor Yevgeny Samoilov (or Samojlov) and Zinaida Samoilova (née Levina), Samoilova was born in Leningrad on 4 May 1934. Soon after her birth, Samoilova's father moved the family to Moscow. As a young girl, Samoilova was interested in ballet and studied music with her mother. She attended the prestigious Stanislavsky and Nemirovich-Danchenko Music Theatre to study ballet, but chose to attend the Boris Shchukin Theatre Institute to study acting instead of pursuing a ballet career. While still in school, she appeared in one film – The Mexican by director Vladimir Kaplunovskiy.

== Film career ==
After three years at the Boris Shchukin Theater, Samoilova landed the lead role of Veronika in Mikhail Kalatozov's war film The Cranes Are Flying in 1957. The film was a tremendous success, becoming the only Soviet movie to win the Palme d'Or, at the 1958 Cannes Film Festival. Samoilova received a special mention for "Most Modest and Charming Actress". She went on to win Best Foreign Actress at the Jussi Awards and the German Film Critics Award for Best Actress in 1958. In 1959, she was nominated for Best Foreign Actress at the BAFTA Awards.

While on tour promoting The Cranes Are Flying, Samoilova met Pablo Picasso who boldly predicted "tomorrow you will be driving in a car through Hollywood". The prediction nearly came true, as she received offers to work in Hollywood and other foreign film industries. However, upon returning home she learned the Soviet government would forbid her taking foreign roles because she was still a student at the time.

Instead, Samoilova followed up her role in The Cranes Are Flying with the lead role in Cranes director Mikhail Kalatozov's next film, Letter Never Sent (1959). In 1960, she lost her job at the Mayakovsky Theatre and was unemployed for several years. Samoilova starred in Giuseppe De Santis' war drama Attack and Retreat (1964). Samoilova had the title role in Aleksandr Zarkhi's Anna Karenina (1967), appearing beside her former husband Vasily Lanovoy in the film.

Nirvana (2008) was Samoilova's final film as an actor.

== Legacy ==
After several roles during the 1970s, Samoilova largely avoided the public light. Even so, she remained one of Russia's most popular actresses. In 1993, Samoilova was named a People's Artist of Russia, one of the state's highest honors. In 2007, she was awarded a Lifetime Achievement Award at the 29th Moscow International Film Festival.

Samoilova made a comeback in the 2000s, appearing in a number of television programs. Her final role was in Igor Voloshin's film Nirvana (2008). In honor of her 80th birthday, Russian state television broadcast a series of programs about Samoilova on 4 May 2014.

== Personal life and death ==
Samoilova was married four times; the last of these was to author Sol Shulman. All of her marriages ended in divorce.

On 3 May 2014, the eve of her 80th birthday, Samoilova was taken to hospital in serious condition with coronary heart disease and hypertension. She died the following day at 23:30, and was buried at Novodevichy cemetery on 7 May. President Vladimir Putin sent his condolences upon Samoilova's death. At her funeral, movie industry insiders spoke of Samoilova's artistic gifts, but also spoke about how the Soviet government had in effect cheated her out of the fortune she should have earned. Singer and Member of Parliament Iosif Kobzon remarked, "She didn't have money. It’s shameful how cultural figures are treated."

Samoilova was survived by a brother, her son from her third marriage, and a granddaughter, who was named after her.

== Filmography ==
- The Mexican (1955) as Mariya
- The Cranes Are Flying (1957) as Veronika
- Letter Never Sent (1959) as Tanya
- Vingt Mille Lieues sur la Terre (1960) as Natasha
- Alba Regia (1961) as Alba
- Attack and Retreat (1964) as Sonya
- Anna Karenina (1967) as Anna Karenina
- Nechayannye radosti (1970)
- Gorod na Kavkaze (1972 short film) as Nadezhda
- Okean (1974) as Masha
- Vozvrata net (1975) as Nastyura Shevtsova
- Diamonds for the Dictatorship of the Proletariat (1975) as Olenetskaya
- 24 Hours (2000) as Mama
- Moscow Saga (2004 TV Series) as the professor
- Far from Sunset Boulevard (2006) as Lidiya Polyakova
- Nirvana (2008) as Margarita Ivanovna
