= Heart of Africa (disambiguation) =

Heart of Africa is a 1985 video game for the Commodore 64.

Heart of Africa may also refer to:

- Heart of Africa (award), a former name for the Africa Movie Academy Award for Best Nigerian Film
- Heart of Africa Mission, now WEC International, an interdenominational mission agency
- The Heart of Africa, a 1967 film by Solomon Efimovich Shulman
- The Heart of Africa, a 1973 book by Georg August Schweinfurth
- Heart of Africa, a 2020 film by Tshoper Kabambi

== Zoo exhibits ==
- Heart of Africa, a shelved biodome project at the Chester Zoo, Cheshire, England
- Heart of Africa, Columbus Zoo and Aquarium, Ohio, US
- Heart of Africa, Marwell Zoo, Hampshire, England
- Heart of Africa, now the African Woods and African Outpost, San Diego Zoo Safari Park, California, US

== See also ==
- Into the Heart of Africa, a 1989 exhibit at the Royal Ontario Museum
