= Vasily Lanovoy =

Soviet and Russian actor (1934–2021)

- Василий Лановой
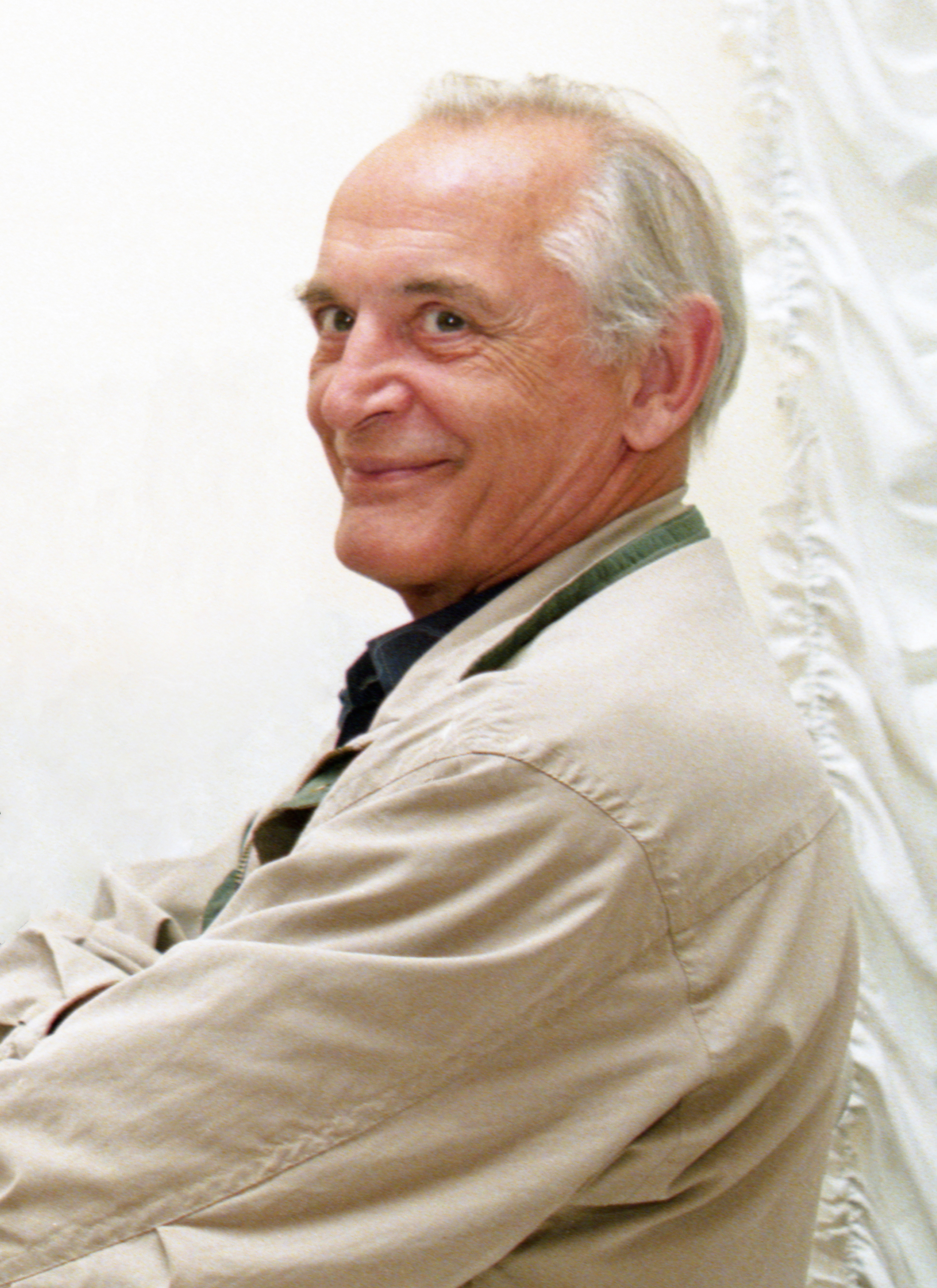
- Lanovoy in 2001
- Born: 16 January 1934; Moscow, Russian SFSR, Soviet Union
- Died: 28 January 2021 (aged 87); Moscow, Russia
- Occupation: Actor
- Years active: 1954–2021
- Spouse(s): Tatiana Samoilova (m. 1955–1958) Tamara Zyablova (m. 1961–1971) Irina Kupchenko (m. 1972–2021)

Vasily Semyonovich Lanovoy (Note: Russian: Василий Семёнович Лановой, romanized: Vasily Semyonovich Lanovoy; Ukrainian: Василь Семенович Лановий, romanized: Vasyl Semenovych Lanovyi) (16 January 1934 – 28 January 2021) was a Soviet and Russian actor who worked in the Vakhtangov Theatre, Moscow. He was also known as the President of Artek Festival of Films for Children. Lanovoy's honours include the KGB Prize, the Lenin Prize, and the title of People's Artist of the USSR. In 2019, he received the title of Hero of Labour of the Russian Federation.

== Acting career ==
Lanovoy came to prominence through playing bold, dashing characters, combining heroic bravado with a sensitivity typical of Russian heroes, a tendency evident in many of his early features, such as Certificate of Maturity (1954) and Pavel Korchagin (1956).

Lanovoy's many film roles from the 1960s include Anatole Kuragin in Sergei Bondarchuk's War and Peace and Count Vronsky in the screen version of Anna Karenina. By this time, he has tried to create complex psychological portraits of his characters.

However, he is best known for his roles in iconic 1970s World War II-themed films. Lanovoy portrayed Ivan Varavva, one of the main characters in the 1971 saga Officers which became a life-affirming film for the Soviet Army officers. He also played a supporting role of SS General Karl Wolff in the cult spy thriller TV-series Seventeen Moments of Spring (1973).

In 2000s, Lanovoy appeared primarily in the roles of Soviet-era party bosses, such as Yuri Andropov in the 2005 TV film Brezhnev. In 2013, he played the role of Cardinal Richelieu in Russian movie The Three Musketeers.

== Political views ==
In 2014, he signed a petition supporting the actions of Vladimir Putin in the annexation of Crimea, for which he was banned from entering Ukraine. Crimea is since March 2014 under dispute by Russia and Ukraine.

He was critical of the (late 2013 until early 2014) Ukrainian Euromaidan demonstrations, claiming that the United States were using Ukrainians for their own political gain.

== Personal life ==
Lanovoy was born to a family of Ukrainian peasants. His parents, originally from the rural Odesa Oblast, escaped the famine to Moscow. However, the World War II Nazi/Romanian occupation caught little Vasily in southern Ukraine with his village relatives while his parents were evacuated to the Soviet rear as workers with a military-critical industrial company.

Lanovoy was married to Irina Kupchenko, herself a famous Soviet actress educated in Kyiv. His first wife was another film star, Tatiana Samoilova, best known for her leading part in The Cranes Are Flying.

Lanovoy died from complications of COVID-19 at a hospital in Moscow on 28 January 2021, less than two weeks after his 87th birthday.

== Honors and awards ==
1968 – Honored Artist of the RSFSR
1971 – Best Actor of the year, by a poll of the Sovetsky Ekran magazine (for the film Officers)
1978 – People's Artist of the RSFSR
1980 – Lenin Prize - for participation in the documentary film The Great Patriotic War
1983 – KGB Award for the film "Fight at the crossroads"
1984 – Prize of the USSR Ministry of Internal Affairs - for the film Proceed to Eliminate
1985 – People's Artist of the USSR
1994 – Order of Friendship of Peoples - for merits in development of theatrical art
2001 – Order of Honour
2004 – Order "For Merit to the Fatherland", 4th class - for his great contribution to the development of theatrical art
2004 – Order of Merit, 3rd class (Ukraine) - for high professionalism and considerable contribution to the development of Russian-Ukrainian cultural relations
2008 – Order "For Merit to the Fatherland", 3rd class - for his contribution to the development of domestic theatrical and cinematic arts, a multi-year social work
2008 – Special Prize of the President of Belarus "for preserving and developing traditions of spirituality in the cinema"
2009 – "Great Literary Prize of Russia" (Russian Writers' Union), the prize "For the benefit of Russia" for his outstanding contribution to the development of Russian culture
2010 – Tsarskoselskaya art prize
2013 – Order of Alexander Nevsky
2014 – Order of Merit, 2nd class (Ukraine) - for a significant personal contribution to the socio-economic, scientific and technical, cultural and educational development of the Ukrainian state
2019 – Hero of Labour of the Russian Federation

== Selected filmography ==
- Certificate of Maturity (1954)
- Pavel Korchagin (1956)
- Scarlet Sails (1961)
- Striped Trip (1961)
- Colleagues (1962)
- Going Inside a Storm (1965)
- War and Peace (1966-1967)
- Anna Karenina (1967)
- No Password Necessary (1967)
- Solaris (1968 TV film)
- The Sixth of July (1968)
- Officers (1971)
- Seventeen Moments of Spring (1973 TV series)
- Sea Cadet of Northern Fleet (1973)
- The Days of the Turbins (1976)
- Soldiers of Freedom (1977)
- A Strange Woman (1977)
- Petrovka, 38 (1980)
- Ogaryova Street, Number 6 (1980)
- Start Liquidation (1983)
- Black Square (1992)
- Trifles of Life (1992-1995 TV series)
- The Aristocratic Peasant Girl (1995)
- Chivalric Romance (2000)
- Brezhnev (2005)
- The Three Musketeers (2013)
