= Ogaryova Street, Number 6 =

- Russian: Огарёва, 6
- Directed by: Boris Grigoryev
- Written by: Yulian Semyonov
- Starring: Vasily Lanovoy; Georgi Yumatov; Yevgeni Gerasimov; Vsevolod Kuznetsov; Dimitri Jaiani
- Cinematography: Igor Klebanov
- Edited by: Nina Vasilyeva
- Music by: Georgiy Dmitriev
- Release date: 1980
- Country: Soviet Union
- Language: Russian

Ogaryova Street, Number 6 (Russian: Огарёва, 6) is a 1980 Soviet crime film directed by Boris Grigoryev. The film tells the story of a detective who uncovers a sprawling criminal network involving illegal gemstone production and murder, leading to a high-stakes pursuit across Soviet cities as he battles corruption and fights to bring justice for his fallen comrades.

== Plot ==
In August and September of 1980, a series of crimes unfold across various Soviet cities. In Leningrad, a farmer named Kiknadze, visiting the city to buy a car, is found murdered from an overdose of a powerful sedative. Soon after, in Moscow, a similar attack occurs, but the victim survives and escapes from the hospital, leaving behind a fake passport under the name Urushadze, bearing the photo of Nalbandov, head of the quality control department at the Prigor Jewelry Factory. In Sukhumi, Georgia, a young actress is nearly assaulted, and the attacker flees, leaving behind gemstones with traces of the same sedative found on Kiknadze. The police obtain an image of the suspect from a film crew’s footage, leading to the arrest of a graduate student, Kazhaev, for attempted assault. Further investigation reveals that the gems were cut at the Prigor factory, linking them to a wider conspiracy involving the factory’s director, Pimenov, who uses his influence with government officials to hide his role in the illegal trade of gems. When the police dig deeper, they discover that Pimenov and his associates were misappropriating factory equipment to produce illegal gems for sale.

Colonel Sukhishvili collaborates with locals, uncovering evidence of a stash of gems and money hidden by Pimenov’s gang. The scheme traces back to Kazhaev, who attempted to steal gems from Nalbandov, almost poisoning him in the process. When Nalbandov was injured by a factory guard, he exposed Pimenov and Kazhaev’s operations. As police close in, Pimenov attempts to flee but is ultimately recognized and apprehended on the tarmac at Perm airport. The film ends as Investigator Kostenko visits the graves of his fallen colleagues, honoring their sacrifices.

== Cast ==
- Vasily Lanovoy
- Georgi Yumatov
- Yevgeni Gerasimov
- Vsevolod Kuznetsov
- Dimitri Jaiani
- Gia Badridze
- Vsevolod Larionov
- Nodar Bekauri
- Nodar Mgaloblishvili
- Ivan Ryzhov
