= Salt for Svanetia =

1930 film

- Directed by: Mikhail Kalatozov
- Written by: Sergei Tretyakov; Mikhail Kalatozov
- Cinematography: Shalva Gegelashvili; Mikhail Kalatozov
- Edited by: Viktor Shklovsky
- Distributed by: Gruziya-film
- Release date: November 1931
- Running time: 55 min
- Country: Soviet Union
- Language: Silent film (Russian intertitles)

Salt for Svanetia (Georgian: მარილი სვანეთს marili svanets; Russian: Соль Сванетии, romanized: Sol' Svanetii) is a 1930 Soviet silent documentary film directed by Mikhail Kalatozov. As one of the earliest ethnographic films, it documents the life of the Svan people in the isolated mountain village of Ushguli in Svanetia, in the northwestern part of the Georgian Soviet Republic.

== Synopsis ==
Salt for Svanetia (1930)

Most of Salt for Svanetia describes and explores the daily life of the Svan people, who live isolated from civilisation in a harsh natural environment in the mountainous region of Svanetia, in present-day Georgia. The film starts with the Lenin quotation "Even now there are far reaches of the Soviet Union where the patriarchal way of life persists along with remnants of the clan system." Svanetia and the mountain village of Ushguli are then located on two slowly dissolving maps of the region and are described as "cut off from civilization by mountains and glaciers". The location of the village is further introduced by several expository shots showing the Svanetian landscape. These shots give some emphasis to tall towers (called Svan towers). It explains that these have been constructed by villagers to serve as a defense against feudal overseers, and it shows how villagers have used them to fend off tax collectors by heaving rocks from the tower tops. This introductory focus on class conflict fades as the film moves to concentrate on the daily routine of the villagers. One sequence shows how sheep are raised, another how wool and yarn are produced, and another on how barley is threshed. These sequences powerfully convey the technological underdevelopment of the area. Wool spinning technique antedates the spinning wheel; barley is threshed by cattle dragging a stone studded platform, weighed down by a mother tending to her child, over the barley. Another scene shows a suspension bridge and a man trying to cross over rushing water as his pack animals resist. A desperate harvest during an early July snowstorm is shown. Other scenes show how the Svan people tailor their clothes, make hats, cut their hair and bury their dead.

The film then concentrates on the lack of salt supplies. Cut off from the outside world for most of the year, the village suffers from a shortage of salt. It is shown how this forces the animals to lick human sweat and urine. A party of workers, returning from migratory labor farther down the valley, are shown bringing salt back to the village. Most of them die when they are crushed by an avalanche. The solution to the salt shortage is presented in the climax of the film where the young Soviet power builds a road that connects the isolated region to the outside world. The film shows how teams of construction workers with their steamrollers arrive, cutting down a forest that is the last obstacle for the road that will connect the Svan people with Soviet civilisation.

== Production ==
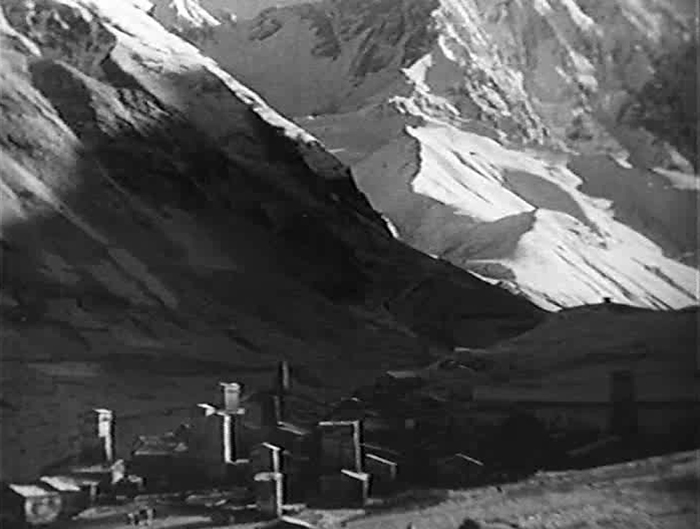
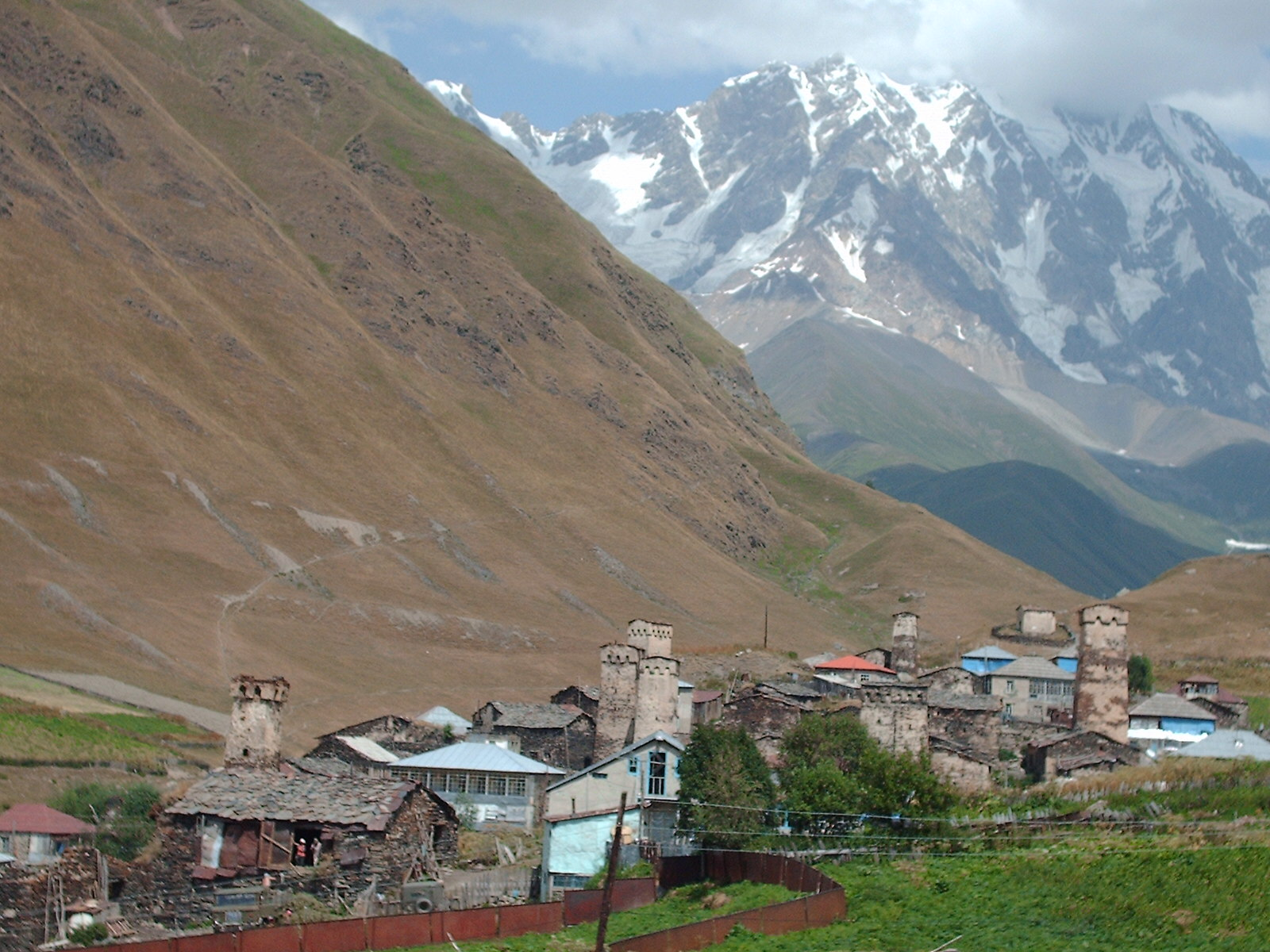
The mountain village of Ushguli during the opening of the film (left) and in 2006 (right)

Svanetia was an underdeveloped region, and thus Soviet planners tried to make it a showcase of Soviet modernization during the first five-year plan between 1928 and 1932. During this time roads were built, an air service was established and industries such as mining and lumbering were developed. It was against this background of Svanetia as a showcase of Soviet modernization that Salt for Svanetia was produced.

Inspired by a tour of the Caucasus, the writer and journalist Sergei Tretyakov wrote a newspaper article that gave Kalatozov the idea for the film. Tretyakov then wrote a script for Kalatozov, and shooting began in the village of Ushguli in Upper Svanetia. Originally the film was planned to be a fictional feature film, but ultimately Viktor Shklovsky edited the footage Kalatozov had shot in Svanetia into a documentary film. The authenticity of some scenes has been disputed by the Svan people who deny that some of the customs shown have ever existed. The cinematography of Mikhail Kalatozov and the cinematographer Shalva Gegelashvili has been described as expressionistic due to its use of dramatic shadows, silhouettes against a dramatic skyline and Dutch angles.

== Responses ==
After the film was finished it was criticized by Stalinist authorities as being unbalanced and unfair towards Svanetia. It was claimed that the director was too fascinated by the backwardness and superstition of Svanetia, and only superficially interested in socialist modernization. Kalatozov fell out of favor, culminating in a ban of his next film Nail in the Boot and a denunciation of his script on Imam Shamil.

Despite the negative immediate reaction, Salt for Svanetia has been praised by film historians and other film directors. The Russian film director Andrei Tarkovsky called it an "amazing film". The American film historian Jay Leyda described it as a "masterpiece" and "the most powerful documentary film I have ever seen". In a 2012 poll of film critics by Tbilisi Intermedia, Salt for Svanetia was listed third among the 12 best films of Georgian cinema.

On the review aggregator website Rotten Tomatoes, 100% of 7 critics' reviews are positive.

== Related ==
In 2015 the Scottish klezmer band Moishe's Bagel created a CD soundtrack with the same name to accompany the film.
