= Bowker's Complete Video Directory =

- Original title: Variety’s Complete Home Video Directory
- Language: English
- Subject: Home video
- Publisher: R. R. Bowker
- Publication date: 1988
- Publication place: New Providence, New Jersey
- Media type: Print (hardcover); Digital (CD-ROM)
- Dewey Decimal: 384
- LC Class: PN1992 (Entertainment volumes); LB1043 (Education volumes)

Bowker's Complete Video Directory is a reference guide to home video releases distributed in the United States. The directory includes alphabetical lists of video titles, including such data as the language, subject or genre, duration, creative personnel, and video distributor.

The Complete Video Directory (CVD) is compiled, edited, and published by R. R. Bowker. Bowker obtains data about video releases directly from distributors, but the CVD is not a mail-order catalog. Rather, it provides a list price and one or more identifiers (catalog number, UPC number, or ISBN), so that prospective buyers can identify and purchase the title—either from the distributor or elsewhere. The CVD is published primarily for librarians and retailers who need information about titles that they might purchase for their collection.

R. R. Bowker is also responsible for such bibliographies as Ulrich's Periodicals Directory (est. 1932) and Books In Print (est. 1948).

== Publication history ==
The first edition of the Directory, which was then called Variety’s Complete Home Video Directory, was compiled by staff of Variety, a trade magazine about the American film industry. As such, it only included feature films and other entertainment titles, and not educational or informational works. R. R. Bowker published this reference guide in 1988. In 1989, editors at Bowker worked to expand the Directory to include educational and "special interest" videos. Bowker published a new, enlarged edition of the work in 1990; many editions have since followed.

== Contents ==
The Directory lists only titles that are currently offered by a distributor on optical media (such as DVD-Video and LaserDisc) or videotape. Among the videotape formats found in the directory are U-matic, Betamax, VHS, S-VHS, and Video8.

The 1993 edition of the Directory had approximately 89,000 entries: about 37,000 in "Entertainment" and some 52,000 in "Education / Special Interest". The 2026 edition has more than 225,000 titles: about 75,000 entries in "Entertainment", and 150,000 entries in "Education / Special Interest".

From 1986 to 1998, Bowker marketed a CD-ROM version of Variety’s Complete Home Video Directory, called Variety’s Video Directory Plus. In 1998, they replaced this product with the revised and retitled CD-ROM Bowker’s Complete Video Directory on Disc. Unlike print editions of the Complete Video Directory, the CD-ROM reproduces film and video reviews from Variety, Publishers Weekly, Library Journal, School Library Journal, Choice, Booklist, and Kirkus Reviews.

=== Organization ===
In its print form, the Directory is divided into multiple volumes. "Entertainment" titles (e.g., feature films and box sets of television series) are indexed separately from "Educational / Special Interest" titles (educational films, informational or instructional videos, and some types of sport videos). Some documentary films are indexed in the former category, others in the latter. Each index lists titles alphabetically. Films distributed by more than one company have multiple entries.

Indices other than the alphabetical lists of titles vary by edition and volume, but may include the following:

- Awards and their recipients
- Directors and cast members
- Genres
- Series
- Subjects
- Subject headings
- Closed captioned videos
- Spanish-language videos
- Names of manufacturers
- Names of distributors/wholesalers

== See also ==
- Audiovisual
- Filmography
