= La caleta olvidada =

1958 film

- Directed by: Bruno Gebel
- Written by: Isidora Aguirre; Bruno Gebel
- Starring: Sara Astica
- Release date: 1958
- Country: Chile
- Language: Spanish

La caleta olvidada ("The Forgotten Cove") is a 1958 Chilean film directed by Bruno Gebel. It was entered into the main competition at the 1958 Cannes Film Festival, the only Chilean film in history to do so.

== Plot ==
A father and son from the capital arrive at Horcones Cove with the aim of turning an old settlement into a fishing business. The idea excites the younger locals, but it meets with disapproval from the adults. In the end, the elders drive the newcomers out, choosing to continue their humble but more peaceful life. Only the industrialist's son, drawn to the serene lifestyle of the area, gives up city life and stays with the fishermen.

== Cast ==
- Sara Astica
- Fernando Davanzo
- Claudio Di Girolamo
- Armando Fenoglio
- Ximena Marín
