= Attack and Retreat =

- Directed by: Giuseppe De Santis; Dmitri Vasilyev
- Written by: Ennio De Concini; Giuseppe De Santis; Sergey Smirnov; Augusto Frassinetti
- Starring: Arthur Kennedy; Peter Falk; Zhanna Prokhorenko; Tatyana Samojlova
- Music by: Armando Trovajoli
- Release date: 1964
- Countries: Italy; USSR
- Languages: Italian; Russian

Attack and Retreat (Italian: Italiani brava gente, Russian: Они шли на Восток, romanized: Oni shli na Vostok) is a Soviet-Italian war drama film directed by Giuseppe De Santis and Dmitri Vasilyev in 1964. The movie follows the steps of Italian soldiers of the Italian Army in Russia fighting on the Eastern Front on Hitler's side. Heavily based on diaries and memories of real war veterans.

== Plot ==
During the Second World War in July 1941, Colonel Sermonti led an Italian regiment sent to the Soviet Union as part of the CSIR to assist German forces on the Eastern Front. The initial enthusiasm of the Italian soldiers quickly gave way to a harsh reality - vast landscapes, challenging weather, hostile locals, mistreatment by the Germans, tough battles, scorched-earth tactics, strained relations with allies, and a stalled offensive near Moscow all took a toll on their morale.

The troops' spirits collapsed definitively the following year when the CSIR, now part of the 8th Italian Army, supported German forces during the second summer offensive. The Soviets launched a counteroffensive, forcing the Italians to defend on the banks of the Don River and eventually retreat.

The story revolves around a group of soldiers, including Loris, a naive Romagnol farmer who died while following a Russian girl into a sunflower field; Collodi, a Tuscan typesetter who perished due to a comrade's thoughtless action; Calò, a Sicilian who, along with the colonel, became a Soviet prisoner; Major Ferri, a hidden fascist killed by fellow Italians during the retreat; and Libero, a Roman plumber who, after Giuseppe's death, left the group, attempting to return alone and succumbing to hardships in a storm.

== Cast ==
- Arthur Kennedy as Ferro Maria Ferri
- Peter Falk as Lieutenant Mario Salvioni
- Zhanna Prokhorenko as Katya
- Raffaele Pisu as Libero Gabrielli
- Tatyana Samojlova as Sonya
- Andrea Checchi as Colonel Sermonti
- Riccardo Cucciolla as Giuseppe Sanna
- Valeri Somov as Giuliani
- Nino Vingelli as Amalfitano
- Lev Prygunov as Loris Bazzocchi
- Grigory Mikhaylov as Russian Partisan (as Grigorij Mikhailov)
- Erwin Knausmyuller as German colonel
- Gino Pernice as Collodi
- Boris Kozhukhov as Major
- Vincenzo Polizzi as Sicilian
