= Film distributor =

Person responsible for the marketing of a film

A film distributor is a company or streaming service responsible for the marketing of a film. The distribution company may be the same as, or different from, the production company. Distribution deals are an important part of financing a film.

The distributor may set the release date of a film and the method by which a film is to be exhibited or made available for viewing; for example, directly to the public either theatrically or for home viewing (DVD, video-on-demand, download, television programs through broadcast syndication etc.). A distributor may do this directly, if the distributor owns the theaters or film distribution networks, or through theatrical exhibitors and other sub-distributors. A limited distributor may deal only with particular products, such as DVDs or Blu-rays, or may act in a particular country or market. The primary distributor will often receive credit in the film's credits, one sheet or other marketing material.

== Distribution types ==
=== Theatrical distribution ===
If a distributor is working with a theatrical exhibitor, the distributor secures a contract stipulating the amount of the gross ticket sales the exhibitor will be allowed to retain (usually a percentage of the gross). The distributor collects the amount due, audits the exhibitor's ticket sales as necessary to ensure the gross reported by the exhibitor is accurate, secures the distributor's share of these proceeds, surrenders the exhibitor's portion to it, and transmits the remainder to the production company (or to any other intermediary, such as a film release agent).

The distributor must also ensure that enough film prints are struck to service all contracted exhibitors on the contract-based opening day, ensure their physical delivery to the theater by opening day, monitor exhibitors to make sure the film is in fact shown at the particular theatre with the minimum number of seats and show times, and ensure the prints' return to the distributor's office or other storage resource also on the contract-based return date. In practical terms, this includes the physical production of release prints and their shipping around the world (a process that is being replaced by digital distribution in most developed markets) as well as the creation of posters, newspaper and magazine advertisements, television commercials, trailers, and other types of ads.

The distributor is also responsible for ensuring a full line of advertising material is available for each film which it believes will help the exhibitor attract the largest possible audience, create such advertising if it is not provided by the production company, and arrange for the physical delivery of the advertising items selected by the exhibitor at intervals prior to the opening day. Film distributors spend between $3.5 billion and $4 billion a year in the United States alone on direct buys of advertising such as TV commercials, billboards, online banner ads, radio commercials and the like. That distributor-spending figure does not include additional costs for publicity, film trailers and promotions, which are not classified as advertising but also market films to audiences.

Distributors typically enter into one of the two types of film booking contracts. The most common is the aggregate deal where total box office revenue that a given film generates is split by a pre-determined mutually-agreed percentage between distributor and movie theater. The other method is the sliding scale deal, where the percentage of box office revenue taken by theaters declines each week of a given film's run. The sliding scale actually has two pieces that starts with a minimum amount of money that theater is to keep—often called "the house nut"—after which the sliding scale kicks in for revenue generated above the house nut. However, this sliding scale method is falling out of use. Whatever the method, box office revenue is usually shared roughly 50/50 between film distributors and theaters.

Some studios would distribute films only theatrically with other studios distributing the film on home video. For example, in the United States and Canada, 20th Century Fox distributed Young Guns theatrically and the film's international distributor Vestron Pictures distributed the film on home video.

=== International distribution ===
If the distributor is handling an imported or foreign film, it may also be responsible for securing dubbing or subtitling for the film, and securing censorship or other legal or organizational approval for the exhibition of the film in the country/territory in which it does business, prior to approaching the exhibitors for booking. Depending on which studio that is distributing the film, the studio will either have offices around the world, by themselves or partnered with another studio, to distribute films in other countries. If a studio decides to partner with a native distributor, upon release both names will appear. The foreign distributor may license the film for a certain amount of time, but the studio will retain the copyright of the film. When a film is produced and distributed by an independent production company and independent distributor (meaning outside the studios), generally an international sales agent handles the licensing of international rights to the film. The international sales agent will find a local distributor in each individual international territory and license the exclusive rights to the film for a certain amount of time but in the same case as the studios described above, the production company will retain the copyright of the film. This means that this distributor in a certain territory has the exclusive right to exploit the film in various media (theatrical, TV, home entertainment, etc.) for a certain amount of time.

=== Non-theatrical distribution ===
This term, used mainly in the British film industry, describes the distribution of feature films for screening to a gathered audience, but not in theaters at which individual tickets are sold to members of the public. The defining distinctions between a theatrical and a non-theatrical screening are that the latter has to be to a closed audience in some way, e.g. pupils of a school, members of a social club or passengers on an airline, and that there can be no individual admission charge. Most non-theatrical screening contracts also specify that the screening must not be advertised, except within the group that is eligible to attend (e.g. in a membership organisation's newsletter or an in-flight magazine).

Non-theatrical distribution includes the airlines and film societies. Non-theatrical distribution is generally handled by companies that specialize in this market, of which Motion Picture Licensing Company (MPLC) and Filmbankmedia are the two largest.

Home video media is sold with a licence that permits viewing in the home only. Until these technologies were widespread, most non-theatrical screenings were on 16 mm film prints supplied by the distributor. Today, the most common business model is for a distributor to sell the exhibitor a licence that permits the projection of a copy of the film, which the exhibitor buys separately on a home video format. These licences can be for individual, one-off screenings. For example, Filmbankmedia offers a Single Title Screening Licence for one-off public screenings of individual titles from the catalogues of the studios it represents. Film licences can also cover an unlimited number of screenings of titles represented by that distributor for a specified time period. The latter are often purchased by pubs and students' unions, to enable them to show occasional feature films on a TV in their bars.

=== Home video distribution ===
Some distributors only handle home video distribution or some subset of home video distribution such as DVD or Blu-ray distribution. The remaining home video rights may be licensed by the producer to other distributors or the distributor may sub-license them to other distributors.

If a distributor is going to distribute a movie on a physical format such as DVD, they must arrange for the creation of the artwork for the case and the face of the DVD and arrange with a DVD replicator to create a glass master to press quantities of the DVD.

Some movie producers use a process called "DVD-on-demand." In DVD-on-demand, a company will burn a DVD-R (a process called "duplication") when a copy of the DVD is ordered, and then ship it to the customer.

A distributor may also maintain contact with wholesalers who sell and ship DVDs to retail outlets as well as online stores, and arrange for them to carry the DVD. The distributor may also place ads in magazines and online and send copies of the DVD to reviewers.

== Early distribution windows ==
Although there are now numerous distribution techniques, in the past the studios and networks were slow to change and did not experiment with different distribution processes. Studios believed that new distribution methods would cause their old methods of revenue to be destroyed. With time, the development of new distribution did prove to be beneficial. The studios revenue was gained from myriad distribution windows. These windows created many opportunities in the industry and allowed networks to make a profit and eliminate failure. These new distribution methods benefited audiences that were normally too small to reach and expanded the content of television. With the new age of technology, networks accepted the fact that it was a consumer demand industry and accepted the new models of distribution.

== Distribution credits ==
The primary distribution companies will usually receive some billing for the film. For example, Gone with the Wind was shown on the one sheet as "A Metro-Goldwyn-Mayer Release". A modern example, Jurassic Park, would be the credit "Universal Pictures presents ...". The Universal production logo also opened the film's trailer. In some cases, there is split distribution as in the case of Titanic (1997): "20th Century Fox and Paramount Pictures present ...". Both companies helped to finance the film.

== See also ==
- List of film distributors by country
- List of home video companies
- Bowker's Complete Video Directory
- Bel Air Circuit
