= Anna Karenina (1967 film) =

1967 film

- USA release DVD cover
- Directed by: Aleksandr Zarkhi
- Screenplay by: Vasily Katanyan; Aleksandr Zarkhi
- Based on: Anna Karenina; 1878 novel by Leo Tolstoy
- Starring: Tatiana Samoilova; Nikolai Gritsenko; Vasily Lanovoy; Yury Yakovlev
- Cinematography: Leonid Kalashnikov
- Edited by: Nina Petrykina
- Music by: Rodion Shchedrin
- Production company: Mosfilm
- Release date: 6 November 1967
- Running time: 143 minutes
- Country: Soviet Union
- Language: Russian

Anna Karenina (Russian: Анна Каренина) is a 1967 Soviet drama film directed by Aleksandr Zarkhi, based on the 1878 novel of the same name by Leo Tolstoy. It was listed to compete at the 1968 Cannes Film Festival, but the festival was cancelled due to the events of May 1968 in France.

== Plot summary ==
Anna Karenina is younger than her husband. She has an affair with the Count Vronsky but this has negative consequences for her.

== Cast ==
- Tatiana Samoilova as Anna Karenina
- Nikolai Gritsenko as Aleksei Karenin
- Vasily Lanovoy as Aleksei Vronsky
- Yury Yakovlev as Stiva Oblonsky
- Boris Goldayev as Konstantin Lyovin
- Iya Savvina as Dolly Oblonskaya
- Anastasiya Vertinskaya as Kitty Shcherbatskaya
- Maya Plisetskaya as Betsy Tverskaya
- Lidiya Sukharevskaya as Lidiya Ivanovna
- Sofia Pilyavskaya as Countess Vronskaya
- Yelena Tyapkina as Knyagina Myagkaya
- Andrei Tutyshkin as Lawyer
- Vasily Sakhnovsky as Seryozha (voiced by Klara Rumyanova)
- Yuri Volyntsev as Vronsky's brother-soldier
- Anatoly Kubatsky as Camerdiner Matvey
- Alexander Kaidanovsky as Jules Lando
