= A Strange Woman =

- Russian: Странная женщина
- Directed by: Yuli Raizman
- Written by: Yevgeny Gabrilovich
- Starring: Irina Kupchenko; Yuri Podsolonko; Vasily Lanovoy; Oleg Vavilov; Antonina Bogdanova
- Cinematography: Naum Ardashnikov
- Edited by: Klavdiya Moskvina
- Music by: Roman Ledenev
- Production company: Mosfilm
- Release date: September 11, 1977
- Running time: 147 minutes
- Country: Soviet Union
- Language: Russian

A Strange Woman (Russian: Странная женщина) is a 1977 Soviet drama film directed by Yuli Raizman.

== Plot ==
The film tells about a 33-year-old woman named Yevgeniya, who dreams of strong feelings and leaves Moscow for the province to her mother. There she gets a job and helps people. Suddenly a young man appears and falls in love with her. At first it frightened her, but after she began to realize that these feelings were mutual.

== Cast ==
- Irina Kupchenko as Yevgeniya Mihaylovna
- Yuri Podsolonko as Andrey Lebedev (as Yu. Podsolonko)
- Vasily Lanovoy as Nikolay Andrianov (as V. Lanovoy)
- Oleg Vavilov as Yura Agapov (as O. Vavilov)
- Antonina Bogdanova
- Tatyana Govorova as Tamara
- Valeriy Todorovskiy as Volodya (as V. Todorovskiy)
- Svetlana Korkoshko as Viktoriya Anatolievna (as S. Korkoshko)
- Mikhail Bovin
- Stepan Bubnov
