= The Seine Meets Paris =

1957 film

- Directed by: Joris Ivens
- Written by: Jacques Prévert
- Narrated by: Serge Reggiani
- Release date: 1957
- Running time: 30 minutes
- Country: France
- Language: French

The Seine Meets Paris (French: La Seine a rencontré Paris) is a 1957 French short documentary film directed by Joris Ivens from a screenplay by Jacques Prévert. Told from the perspective of a boat trip through the city, it features scenes of daily life along the river. The film won the short film Palme d'Or at the 1958 Cannes Film Festival.
