= Transit Film =

German film licensing company

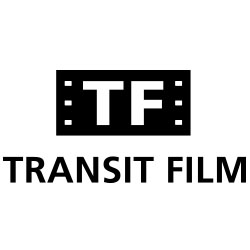
Transit Film Logo

Transit Film GmbH is a German film licensing company located in Munich. The company licenses film documents held by the German Federal Archives (Bundesarchiv), as well as its own filmstock.

== History ==
Transit Film was founded on January 18, 1966 as a federally owned GmbH. For decades, Transit Film has been licensing film documents held by the German Federal Archives. Transit Film also acted as a trustee for the Friedrich-Wilhelm-Murnau-Foundation/Wiesbaden until the end of 2014.

== German Federal Archives Film Collections ==
Transit Film is exclusively appointed to manage the worldwide commercial exploitation of films belonging to the German Federal Archives. For decades, Transit Film has been dealing with material from the beginnings of film making up to the end of World War II in 1945. This film stock consists of silent and sound newsreels and documentary films.

Since 1.1.2014 Transit Film has also been appointed to make accessible and to exploit commercially German Federal Archives newsreels and documentaries from 1945 onwards. An internet platform with digitised films has been established in cooperation with the German Federal Archives. The internet platform allows the user to view, research and order historical footage and serves Film, TV and Press professionals and the public.

== Films owned by Transit Film ==
Transit Film also exploits its own film catalogue consisting of German feature films. Amongst those are classics such as Cat and Mouse (1967), The Bread of Those Early Years (1962) and Genosse Münchhausen (1962).
