= 1958 Cannes Film Festival =

- Official poster of the 11th Cannes Film Festival
- Location: Cannes, France
- Founded: 1946
- Awards: Palme d'Or: The Cranes Are Flying
- No. of films: 26 (In Competition)
- Festival date: 2 May 1958 – 18 May 1958
- Website: festival-cannes.com/en

Cannes Film Festival
- 1959 1957

The 11th Cannes Film Festival took place from 2 to 18 May 1958. French writer Marcel Achard served as Jury President for the main competition.

The Palme d'Or was awarded to The Cranes Are Flying by Mikhail Kalatozov.

== Juries ==
The following people were appointed as the Jury of the 1958 competition:

=== Main Competition ===
- Marcel Achard, French writer - Jury President
- Tomiko Asabuki, Japanese
- Bernard Buffet, French painter
- Jean De Baroncelli, French film critic
- Helmut Käutner, West-German filmmaker
- Dudley Leslie, British writer
- Madeleine Robinson, French actress
- Ladislao Vajda, Hungarian filmmaker
- Charles Vidor, American filmmaker
- Sergei Yutkevich, Soviet filmmaker
- Cesare Zavattini, Italian writer

=== Short Films Competition ===
- Norman McLaren, Canadian animator
- Jean Mitry, French film theorist, critic and filmmaker
- Krishna Riboud, India historian
- Edmond Séchan, French cinematographer and film director
- Jerzy Toeplitz, Polish film educator

== Official Selections ==
=== In Competition ===
The following feature films competed for the Palme d'Or:

English title	Original title	Director(s)	Production country
Brink of Life	Nära livet	Ingmar Bergman	Sweden
The Brothers Karamazov		Richard Brooks	United States
La caleta olvidada		Bruno Gebel	Chile
The Cranes Are Flying	Летят журавли	Mikhail Kalatozov	Soviet Union
Desire Under the Elms		Delbert Mann	United States
The Flute and the Arrow	En Djungelsaga	Arne Sucksdorff	Sweden
Girl and the River	L'eau vive	François Villiers	France
Goha		Jacques Baratier	France
Iron Flower	Vasvirág	János Herskó	Hungary
The Long, Hot Summer		Martin Ritt	United States
A Man of Straw	L'uomo di paglia	Pietro Germi	Italy
A Matter of Dignity	Το τελευταίο ψέμα	Michael Cacoyannis	Greece
Mon Oncle		Jacques Tati	France, Italy
Nine Lives	Ni Liv	Arne Skouen	Norway
Orders to Kill		Anthony Asquith	United Kingdom
Parash Pathar	পরশ পাথর	Satyajit Ray	India
Pardesi	Хождение за три моря	Khwaja Ahmad Abbas and Vasili Pronin	India, Soviet Union
Rosaura at 10 O'Clock	Rosaura a las diez	Mario Soffici	Argentina
Sissi – Fateful Years of an Empress	Sissi – Schicksalsjahre einer Kaiserin	Ernst Marischka	Austria
Snow Country	雪国	Shirō Toyoda	Japan
The Spessart Inn	Das Wirtshaus im Spessart	Kurt Hoffmann	West Germany
Suburban Romance	Žižkovská romance	Zbyněk Brynych	Czechoslovakia
The Thistles of the Baragan	Ciulinii Bărăganului	Louis Daquin	Romania
Vengeance	La Venganza	Juan Antonio Bardem	Spain
Visages de bronze		Bernard Taisant	France
Young Husbands	Giovani mariti	Mauro Bolognini	Italy

=== Out of Competition ===
The following film was selected to be screened out of competition:

- Gigi by Vincente Minnelli

=== Short Films Competition ===
The following short films competed for the Short Film Palme d'Or:

- A.B.C. by John Fernhout
- Auf den Spuren des Lebens by Fritz Heydenreich
- Dubrovacki pasteli by Marijan Vajda
- Egy masodperc tortenete by Ágoston Kollányi
- Gloria dei Medici by Antonio Petrucci
- Goya, una vida apasionada by José María Ochoa
- Grafica cloveku by France Kosmac
- Horyû-Ji by Susumu Hani
- La Joconde: Histoire d'une obsession by Henri Gruel
- La Seine a rencontré Paris by Joris Ivens
- Les mystères d'une goutte d'eau by Ann H. Matzner Dr.
- Log Drive by Raymond Garceau
- Mandu by Neil Gokhale
- Nagrodzone uczucia by Walerian Borowczyk & Jan Lenica
- Nez nam narostla kridla by Jiří Brdečka
- Ô saisons ô châteaux by Agnès Varda
- Perameren hylkeenpyytajat by Ulf Backstrom
- Sapte Arte by Ion Popescu-Gopo
- Sintra by João Mendes
- The Story of a Roof by Jamie Uys
- Trees And Jamaica Daddy by Lew Keller
- Voici le pays d'Israel by Jean Lehérissey
- Y gorakh salianskykh by Leonid Belokurov, Y. Przyjemski
- Zimniy prazdnik by Mikhail Slutsky

== Official Awards ==
=== Main Competition ===
- Palme d'Or: The Cranes Are Flying by Mikhail Kalatozov
- Best Director: Ingmar Bergman for Brink of Life
- Best Screenplay: Massimo Franciosa, Pasquale Festa Campanile and Pier Paolo Pasolini for Young Husbands
- Best Actress: Bibi Andersson, Eva Dahlbeck, Barbro Hiort af Ornäs and Ingrid Thulin for Brink of Life
- Best Actor: Paul Newman for The Long, Hot Summer
- Jury Prize:
  - Goha by Jacques Baratier
  - Visages de bronze by Bernard Taisant
- Jury Special Prize: Mon Oncle by Jacques Tati
- Special Mention: Tatiana Samoilova for The Cranes Are Flying

=== Short Films Competition ===
- Short Film Palme d'Or:
  - La Joconde: Histoire d'une obsession by Henri Gruel and Jean Suyeux
  - La Seine a rencontré Paris by Joris Ivens
- Special Prize:
  - Auf den Spuren des Lebens by Fritz Heydenreich
  - Nez nam narostla kridla by Jiri Brnecka

== Independent Awards ==
=== FIPRESCI Prize ===
- Vengeance by Juan Antonio Bardem

== Media ==
- British Pathé: Cannes Film Festival 1958 footage
- British Pathé: Originals Cannes Film Festival 1958
- British Pathé: Originals Cannes Film Festival 1958
- INA: Opening of the 1958 festival (commentary in French)
- INA: Celebrities at the 1958 Cannes festival (commentary in French)
- INA: Closure of the 1958 festival (commentary in French)
