= Petrov, Russia =

Petrov (Russian: Петров; masculine) or Petrova (Петрова; feminine) is the name of several rural localities in Russia:

- Petrov, Republic of Adygea, a khutor in Teuchezhsky District of the Republic of Adygea
- Petrov, Belgorod Oblast, a khutor in Krasnogvardeysky District of Belgorod Oblast
- Petrov, Saratov Oblast, a khutor in Tatishchevsky District of Saratov Oblast
- Petrova, Bryansk Oblast, a selo in Karachevsky District of Bryansk Oblast
- Petrova, Perm Krai, a village in Ilyinsky District of Perm Krai
- Petrova, Tyumen Oblast, a village in Vikulovsky District of Tyumen Oblast
