= Solomon Shulman =

Soviet film director

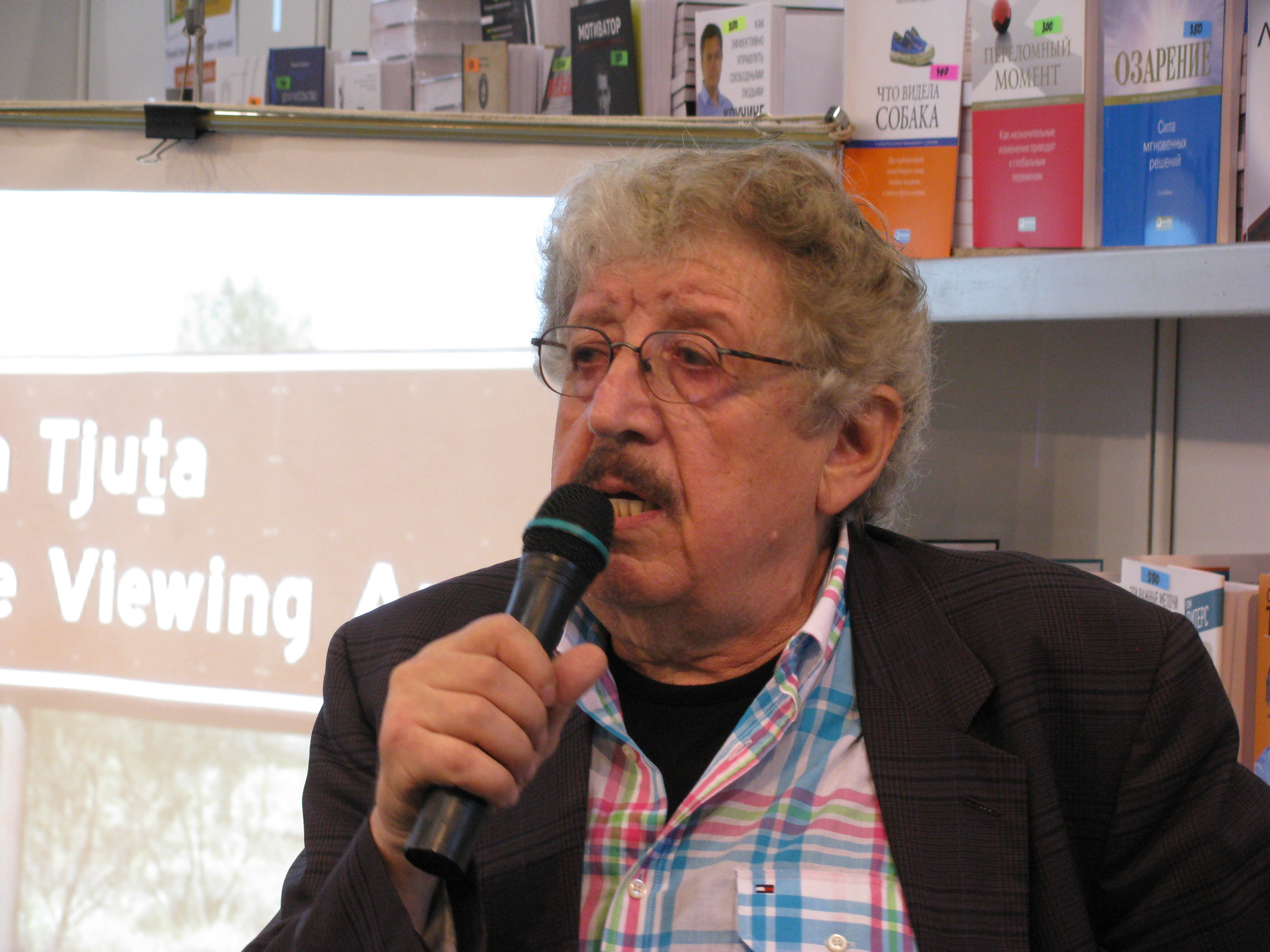
- Sol Shulman, 2011
- Born: Solomon Efimovich Shulman; 20 February 1936; Babruysk, BSSR, USSR
- Died: 6 September 2017 (aged 81); Melbourne, Australia
- Occupation: Author
- Years active: 1960s–2017

Solomon Efimovich Shulman (20 January 1936 – 6 September 2017), Semion Shulman, was a Belarusian author, screenwriter, film director and adventurer.

== Biography ==
Shulman's first profession was engineering. In 1966 he completed his second higher education degree at the Academy of Cinema in Moscow (VGIK), training as a film director. From 1963 to 1973 he worked as one of the creators of a popular documentary series called Film-Adventurer's Almanac (USSR) (artistic director Vladimir A. Shnejderov).

He is the writer of more than 40 documentary films, five feature film scripts, plus a host of literary and publicist works, published in many countries worldwide. He has led film expeditions into the most distant corners of the planet—from the North Pole, to the summits of Pamir, the jungles of Africa, the islands of Oceania, and the deserts of Australia.

He worked at film studios in the USSR, Yugoslavia, Germany, USA, Italy and Australia, and was awarded the Order of Soviet Journalists of the USSR. He was a presidium member of the Eurasian Academy of Television and Radio, a member of the Russian Cinematographers Union and Russian Film Directors Guild, a member of the Russian Writers' Union, a member of the Australian Writers' Guild, and a professor at the Italian State University.

His public appearances always attracted large student crowds in the auditoriums of Italy, England, Germany, Australia and the USA. He lived his last years in Melbourne, Australia.

== Prizes and awards ==
- 1964 First Prize of the USSR Union of Journalists at the All-National Film-Festival for the documentary film In Broad Daylight (Izvestia, Moscow, 10 August 1964).
- 1971 Prize at the Int. Film-Festival in Czechoslovakia for the documentary films On the Slopes of Elbruce and In Ancient Khiv.
- 1976 First Prize at an Int. cinematography competition in Yugoslavia for the script The Disaster (Novosti, Belgrade, 20 January 1976).
- 1998 "Book of the month" awarded by a panel of professional critics for the book Power and Destiny (Izvestia, Moscow, 29 May 1998).
- 2006 Sign of Appreciation III degree, (Int. Conference of Journalists).

== Work ==
=== Bibliography ===
- 1974 On the Edge of the World ("AS" # 1, Yugoslavia)
- 1982 Russia Dies Laughing
- 1985 Aliens over Russia
- 1996 In the Land of Snow and Volcanoes ("New Russian Word", New York)
- 1998 Power and Destiny
- 1998 The Lucky Country (GEO #7)
- 2002 Kings of the Kremlin
- 2004 We are the Last to Leave...
- 2004 Promenade along the Sotzialka
- 2006 Tomorrow Never Comes (National Geographic Traveler #6–7)
- 2007 The Nuclear Age

=== Filmography (abridged) ===
- 1963 The Black Sands of Kara-Kum
- 1964 In Broad Daylight
- 1965 Pamir – Roof of the World
- 1966 The Valley of Sumbar
- 1967 The Heart of Africa
- 1968 The Earthquake
- 1968 Where the Ships Winter
- 1969 On the Slopes of Elbruce
- 1969 In Ancient Khiva
- 1970 The Edge of the World
- 1971 In the Scythian Steppes
- 1973 Alaid – Crater of Fire
- 1974 The Land of my Enemies
- 1984 Art-Nouveau
- 1985 Underwater Children
- 1990 Art Treasures of the World…
- 2004 The Opal Hunter
- 2006 White Man in a Hole

=== Screenplays ===
- 1968 The Nuclear Age (USSR, Mosfilm)
- 1975 The Disaster (Yugoslavia, "FRZ")
- 1978 The Silence (Australia, Victoria Film Corporation Co.)
- 1980 The Jewish Ticket (Australia, Australian Film Commission)
- 2007 Colonel Kondo (Kazakhstan, Capital Group Ltd. SA)
