= Mikhail Kalatozov =

Soviet film director (1903–1973)

- მიხეილ კალატოზიშვილი (Georgian); Михаил Калатозов (Russian)
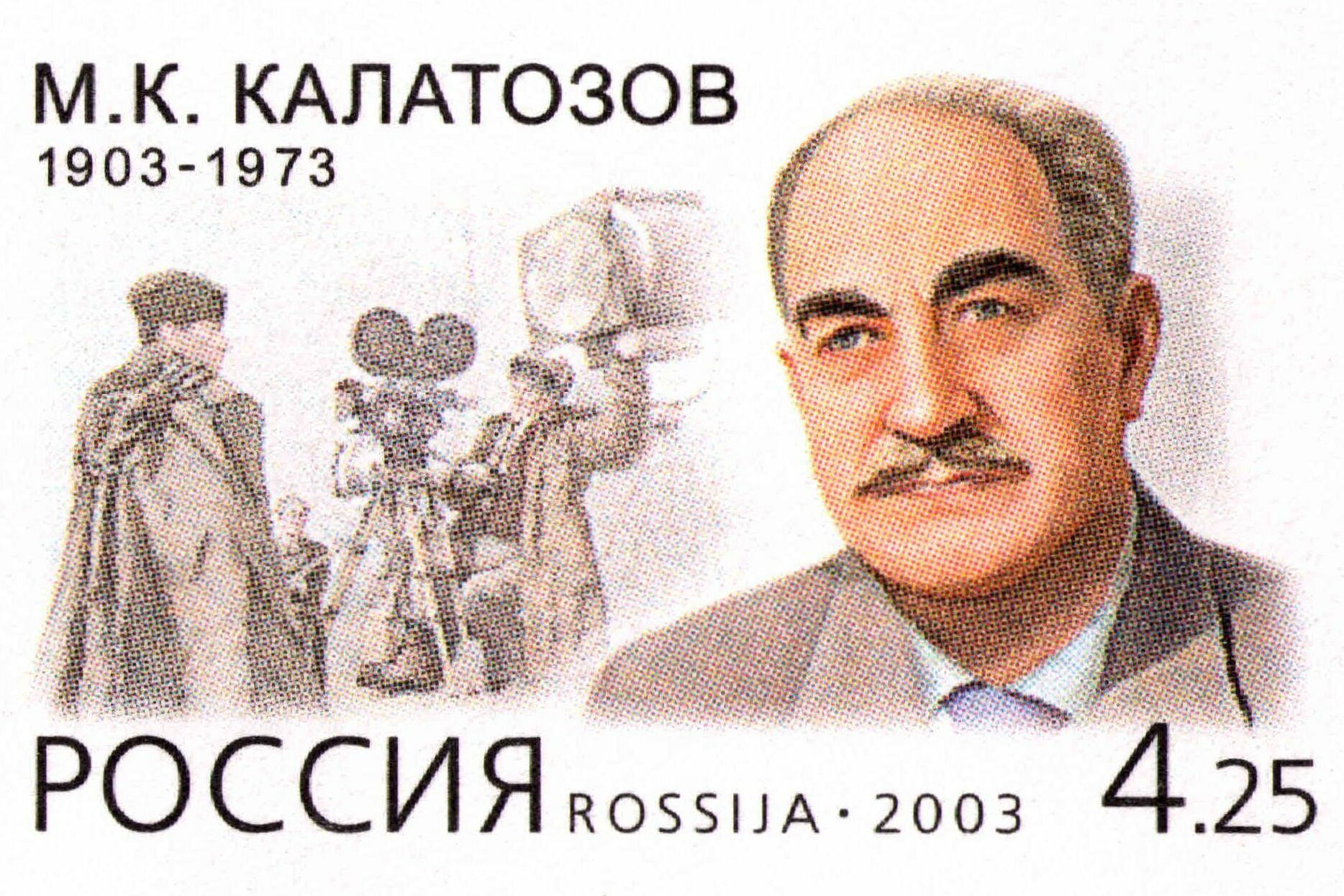
- Kalatozov on a 2003 stamp of Russia
- Born: Mikheil Kalatozishvili; 28 December 1903 [O.S. 15 December] Tiflis, Russian Empire (now in Georgia)
- Died: 26 March 1973 (aged 69); Moscow, Soviet Union
- Resting place: Novodevichy Cemetery, Moscow, Russia
- Occupations: Film director; screenwriter; cinematographer
- Years active: 1928–1971
- Awards: People's Artist of the USSR (1969); People's Artist of the Georgian SSR (1965); State Stalin Prize (1951)

Mikhail Konstantinovich Kalatozov (Georgian: მიხეილ კალატოზიშვილი, Russian: Михаил Константинович Калатозов; 28 December 1903 – 26 March 1973), born Mikheil Kalatozishvili, was a Soviet film director of Georgian origin who contributed to both Georgian and Russian cinema. He is known for his films The Cranes Are Flying and I Am Cuba, winning the Palme d'Or for the former at the 1958 Cannes Film Festival. In 1969, he was named a People's Artist of the USSR.

== Biography ==
Mikhail Konstantinovich Kalatozov was born Mikheil Kalatozishvili into a Georgian family in Tiflis, known by Tbilisi since 1936, in the Russian Empire. His family belonged to a noble Amirejibi house who trace their history back to the 13th century. One of his uncles served as a general in the Imperial Russian Army, and another one was among the Tbilisi State University's founders.

Kalatozov studied economics and changed many professions before starting his film career as an actor and later — as a cinematographer. He directed several documentary films, including Their Kingdom (with Nutsa Gogoberidze, the first Georgian female film director) and Salt for Svanetia (1930).

In 1933 he enrolled to the Russian State Institute of Performing Arts. In 1936 he headed the Kartuli Pilmi film studio, then he was suggested a place at the State Committee for Cinematography. In 1939 he moved to Leningrad to work at the Lenfilm studio as a film director. During World War II he directed several propaganda films and worked as a cultural attaché at the Soviet embassy in the United States.

During the 1950s he directed several other films. His four final features, The Cranes Are Flying (1957), Letter Never Sent (1959), I Am Cuba (1964), and The Red Tent (1969), are among his most famous works. The first three movies are often praised for the masterful camerawork by the Russian cinematographer Sergey Urusevsky. The Cranes Are Flying became one of the leaders of the 1957 Soviet box office (10th place with 28.3 million viewers) and won several international awards, including Palme d'Or at the 1958 Cannes Film Festival. The Red Tent was a joint Soviet-Italian effort and featured an international team of actors, including Peter Finch, Sean Connery, Claudia Cardinale, Hardy Krüger, Nikita Mikhalkov and others. It was nominated for the 1971 Golden Globe Award for Best English-Language Foreign Film. During the 1990s, I Am Cuba was discovered by American film professionals and showed to Martin Scorsese and Francis Ford Coppola, who became so impressed with the production that they advocated the restoration and distribution of the movie that was conducted by Milestone Films. In 1995 it was nominated for the Independent Spirit Award for Best International Film.

Kalatozov was married to Zhanna Valachi, daughter of the Italian consul. They met in Batumi during vacation. In 1929 Zhanna gave a birth to their son Georgy and became a naturalized citizen of the Soviet Union. Georgy followed his father's steps and worked as a cinematographer and film director at the Kartuli Pilmi studio, and so did his grandson — Mikheil Kalatozishvili who also became a successful Russian film director and producer.

Mikhail Kalatozov died in Moscow on March 26, 1973 after his seventh heart attack and was buried at the Novodevichy Cemetery. Mikheil Kalatozishvili founded a non-commercial Mikhail Kalatozov Fund named after his grandfather to help with film preservation and with funding of new movies.

== Filmography ==
Year	Title	Notes
1930	Salt for Svanetia	Documentary
1931	Nail in the Boot	
1939	Courage	
1941	Valery Chkalov	
1950	Conspiracy of the Doomed	
1953	Hostile Whirlwinds	
1954	True Friends	
1955	The First Echelon	
1957	The Cranes Are Flying	
1959	Letter Never Sent	
1964	I Am Cuba	
1969	The Red Tent	

== Literature ==
- Anna Kalatozishvili, Zaza Japaridze (2012). — Mikhail Kalatozov. — Tbilisi, 270 pages. — ISBN 978-9941-0-4685-8 (biography)
- German Kremlev (1964). — Mikhail Kalatozov. — Moscow: Iskusstvo, 244 pages. (biography)
- Cinema: Encyclopedic Dictionary (1987) / Ed.: Sergei Yutkevich. — Moscow: Soviet Encyclopedia, 640 pages.
