= Nail in the Boot =

1931 film

- Russian: Гвоздь в сапоге
- Directed by: Mikhail Kalatozov
- Written by: Leonid Perelman
- Starring: Aleksandre Jaliashvili; Siko Palavandishvili; Akaki Khorava; Arkadi Khintibidze
- Cinematography: Shalva Apaqidze
- Release date: 1931
- Country: Soviet Union
- Language: Russian

Nail in the Boot (Russian: Гвоздь в сапоге, romanized: Gvozd' v sapoge) is a 1931 Soviet war drama film directed by Mikhail Kalatozov.

== Plot ==
During training maneuvers, a worker does not manage to have time to transmit a crucial report because of poor-quality boots and the gas attack destroys the crew of the armored train. The worker is accused of the tragedy, but it is actually the tribunal that is at fault, since it includes the team of the "dead" armored train and includes the shoemakers who made defective shoes.

== Cast ==
- Aleksandre Jaliashvili
- Siko Palavandishvili
- Akaki Khorava
- Arkadi Khintibidze
