= The Cranes Are Flying =

1957 film by Mikhail Kalatozov

- Original film poster
- Russian: Летят журавли
- Directed by: Mikhail Kalatozov
- Written by: Viktor Rozov
- Based on: Life Eternal (play) by Viktor Rozov
- Produced by: Mikhail Kalatozov
- Starring: Tatyana Samojlova; Aleksey Batalov; Vasili Merkuryev, Aleksandr Shvorin
- Cinematography: Sergey Urusevsky
- Edited by: Mariya Timofeyeva
- Music by: Mieczysław Weinberg
- Production company: Mosfilm
- Distributed by: Goskino
- Release date: 12 October 1957 (USSR)
- Running time: 95 minutes
- Country: Soviet Union
- Language: Russian
- Box office: 28,300,000 admissions (USSR); 5,410,000 admissions (France)

The Cranes Are Flying (Russian: Летят журавли, romanized: Letyat zhuravli) is a 1957 Soviet war drama film directed and produced by Mikhail Kalatozov at Mosfilm, written by Viktor Rozov, and starring Aleksey Batalov and Tatiana Samoilova. It depicts the cruelty and the damage done to the Soviet psyche as a result of the Second World War, which was known in the Soviet Union as the Great Patriotic War.

The film had a profound impact on Soviet cinema, and won the Palme d'Or at the 1958 Cannes Film Festival, the only Soviet film to win that award. (Note: In 1946, The Turning Point was one of eleven films awarded the Grand Prix, the predecessor of the Palme d'Or.))

== Plot ==
In Moscow, on June 22, 1941, Veronika and her boyfriend Boris watch cranes fly over the city as the sun rises and then sneak back into their families' apartments. Hours later, Boris’s cousin Mark wakes him with the news that the Germans have invaded.

Veronika soon learns that Boris has volunteered for the army. Boris asks his grandmother to give Veronika her birthday gift, a stuffed squirrel toy, into which he slides a love note. Veronika arrives too late to see Boris at his apartment, but his grandmother gives Veronika the stuffed squirrel.

Veronika searches for Boris at the assembly station for those being drafted into the army, but he has already marched off to war by then. Veronika remains in Moscow with her parents, who are killed in a German air raid that also destroys their apartment building. Boris's family invites the orphaned Veronika to stay with them.

Boris's cousin Mark tells Veronika he loves her, but she faithfully waits for Boris to return. Veronika and Mark are alone in the apartment when another air raid occurs. Mark makes a pass at her, but she rebuffs him. Furious at being rejected, he rapes her. Veronika and Mark marry, but she despises him, and in turn, she is despised by the family who considers her to have betrayed Boris.

At the front, Boris gets into an argument with another soldier, Volodya, who taunts him over a photo of Veronika. Their commanding officer catches them fighting and assigns them a dangerous reconnaissance mission. Boris saves Volodya’s life, but gets shot himself. In his final moments, he has a vision of the wedding that he and Veronika would never have.

To escape the German offensive, the family is relocated to Siberia. Veronika works as a nurse in a military hospital run by Boris's father, Fyodor. Mark and Veronika are miserable in their marriage. When a soldier in the hospital becomes hysterical after receiving a letter saying his girlfriend left him for someone else, Veronika rushes to get Fyodor, who is processing the arrival of wounded troops.

She barely misses seeing the injured Volodya, who is about to be admitted to the hospital, before Fyodor says that the hospital is full. Fyodor admonishes the distraught soldier to forget his unfaithful and unworthy girlfriend. Veronika overhears Fyodor’s speech and becomes upset since she appears to be such a woman. Just before she attempts suicide by trying to throw herself under a train, she sees a young boy about to be hit by a car and rescues him. The boy has been separated from his mother, and his name is Boris. Veronika takes the boy home and looks for her squirrel toy from Boris.

Boris's sister Irina spitefully tells Veronika that Mark is giving the toy to his mistress at her birthday party. Veronika races over to the party, where a partygoer has finally found the note that Boris hid. Veronika grabs it, and in voice-over, Boris narrates the final tender love note to her.

Fyodor learns that Mark bribed his way out of being drafted into the Red Army. He kicks him out, and Veronika is forgiven by the family for "betraying" Boris. Veronika begins to raise the little boy Boris.

Later, Volodya comes looking Boris's family and tells them that Boris is dead. The war ends. Veronika still refuses to believe that Boris is dead since Volodya was injured himself and never saw Boris die.

When Boris’s unit returns, Veronika carries a huge bouquet of flowers and searches for him and his fellow soldier Stepan during a celebration at the train station. Veronika finds Stepan and finally learns that Boris is indeed dead. In tears, she stumbles through the celebrating crowd.

As Stepan gives a rousing speech, asserting that those who died in the war will never be forgotten, Veronika goes from grieving to handing out her flowers to the returning soldiers and their families. When she looks up, cranes are flying again in the sky over Moscow.

== Cast ==
- Tatiana Samoilova as Veronika
- Aleksey Batalov as Boris
- Vasili Merkuryev as Fyodor Ivanovich
- Aleksandr Shvorin as Mark
- Svetlana Kharitonova as Irina
- Konstantin Nikitin as Volodya
- Valentin Zubkov as Stepan
- Antonina Bogdanova as Grandmother
- Boris Kokovkin as Tyernov
- Yekaterina Kupriyanova as Anna Mikhajlovna
- Valentina Ananina as Lyuba
- Valentina Vladimirova as Soldatka
- Olga Dzisko as Dasha
- Leonid Knyazev as Sachkov
- Georgi Kulikov as Anatoliy Kuzmin
- Daniil Netrebin as Raneyy
- Aleksandr Popov as Borya
- Irina Preys as Antonina Monastyrskaya
- Nikolay Smorchkov as Zakharov

== Reception and influence ==
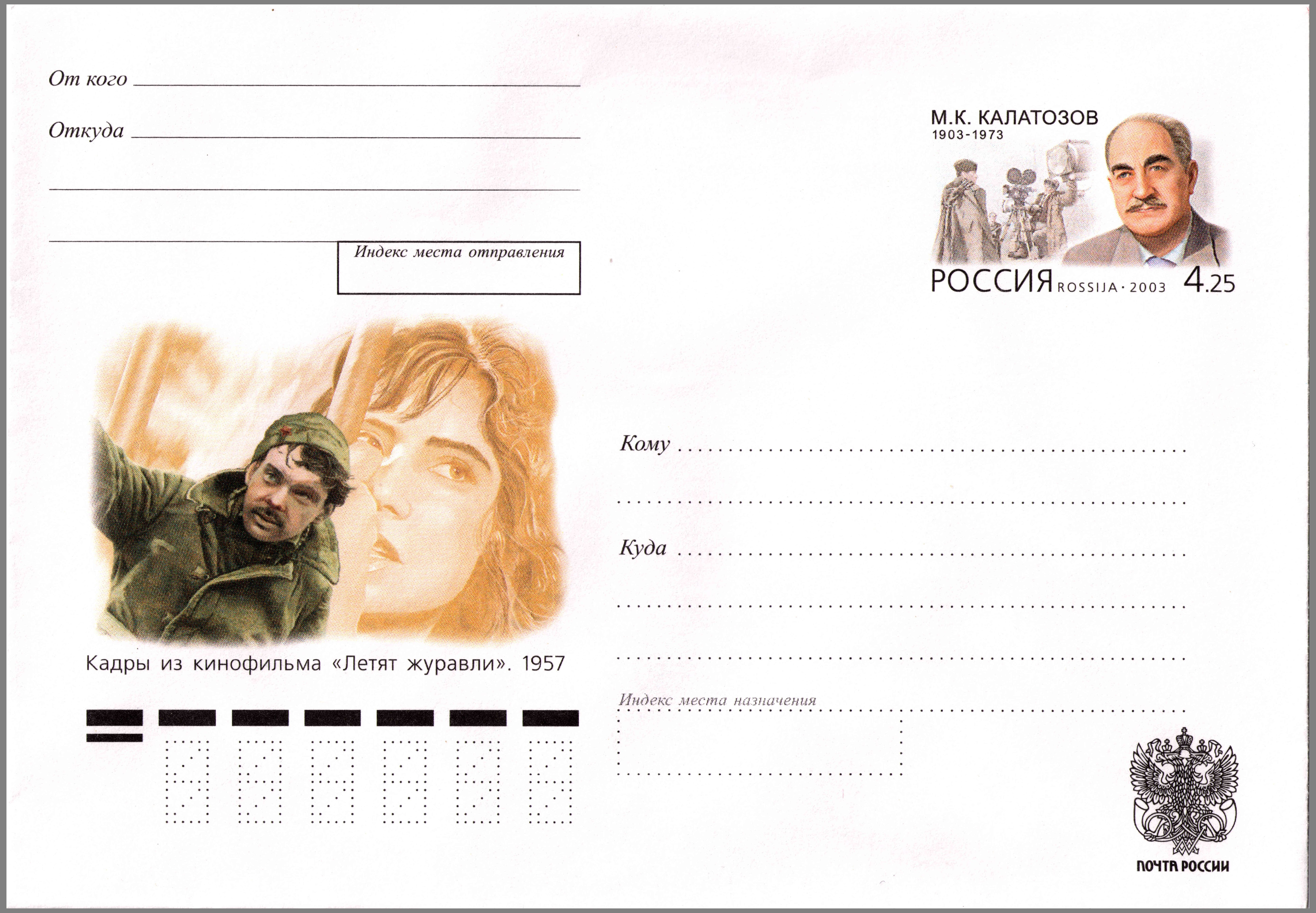
An illustrated PSE with scenes from the film: A. Batalov as Boris, T. Samojlova as Veronika. Russia, 2003.

As the film scholar Josephine Woll observes, the protagonist Veronika was instrumental in shaping post-Stalin Soviet movies by heralding more complicated multi-dimensional celluloid heroines and focusing on the impact of war on common people. It was not only Soviet audiences that accepted and sympathised with Veronika's story. The lead actress of Cranes, Tatiana Samoilova, who was frequently identified with her role, took Europe by storm. Woll notes that the French Liberation commentator, for example, approvingly contrasted Samoilova's purity and authenticity with that of Brigitte Bardot, a French female icon. Samoilova remembered receiving a watch from her East German fans during a festival there. The gift featured the inscription: "Finally we see on the Soviet screen a face, not a mask".

Claude Lelouch referred to the film as one of his favorites, stating "It has not become outdated in any way, it is still magnificent. I have not seen a more beautiful film from Russia. I think I have not seen a better film in principle. Not cinema, but a miracle." In his autobiography, he lists the film in his “cinema pantheon”, alongside Citizen Kane and Napoléon.

John Riley of The Independent claimed the film, "rocked Soviet cinema and changed the West's view of the Soviet Union. Here was a film with real, flawed people, that discussed petty corruption, cowardice and betrayal and had virtuoso camera work way beyond anything seen in the west." Cinematheque Ontario called the director and cinematographer "masters of convulsive bravaura."

On the review aggregator website Rotten Tomatoes, 96% of 27 critics' reviews are positive, with an average rating of 8.7/10. Metacritic, which uses a weighted average, assigned the film a score of 76 out of 100, based on 9 critics, indicating "generally favorable" reviews.

== Awards and honors ==
At the 1958 Cannes Film Festival, the film won the Palme d'Or, the only Soviet film to ever do so (in 1946, The Turning Point was one of eleven films awarded the Grand Prix, the predecessor of the Palme d'Or). Tatiana Samoilova received a Special Mention for her performance.

At the 12th British Academy Film Awards, the film was nominated for Best Film from any Source, and Tatiana Samoilova was nominated for Best Foreign Actress.
