= List of Soviet films of 1959 =

A list of films produced in the Soviet Union in 1959 (see 1959 in film).

== 1959 ==
Title	Russian title	Director	Cast	Genre	Notes
1959
The Adventures of Buratino	Приключения Буратино	Ivan Ivanov-Vano	Georgiy Vitsin	Animation	
Annushka	Аннушка	Boris Barnet	Irina Skobtseva	Drama	
Ballad of a Soldier	Баллада о солдате	Grigori Chukhrai	Vladimir Ivashov, Zhanna Prokhorenko, Antonina Maksimova, Nikolai Kryuchkov	War film	Entered into the 1960 Cannes Film Festival
Battle Beyond the Sun	Небо зовет	Mikhail Karyukov, Aleksandr Kozyr	Ivan Pereverzev	Science-Fiction	
Cruelty	Жестокость	Vladimir Skuybin	Georgi Yumatov	Drama	
Eugene Onegin	Евгений Онегин	Roman Tikhomirov	Vadim Medvedev	Opera	
Fate of a Man	Судьба человека	Sergei Bondarchuk	Sergei Bondarchuk	War film	Won the Grand Prize at the 1st Moscow International Film Festival
Female Age-Mates	Сверстницы	Vasili Ordynsky	Lyudmila Krylova	Drama	
Foma Gordeyev	Фома Гордеев	Mark Donskoy	Sergei Lukyanov	Drama	
Girl Seeks Father	Девочка ищет отца	Lev Golub	Anna Kamenkova	Drama	
The Golden Eshelon	Золотой эшелон	Ilya Gurin	Vasiliy Shukshin	War	
I Was a Satellite of the Sun	Я был спутником Солнца	Yuri Merkulov	P. Makhotin	Drama	
Iriston's Son	Сын Иристона	Vladimir Chebotaryov	Vladimir Tkhapsaev	History	
Ivanna	Иванна	Viktor Ivchenko	Inna Burduchenko, Anatoly Motornyi	Drama	
A Home for Tanya	Отчий дом	Lev Kulidzhanov	Vera Kuznetsova, Lyudmila Marchenko, Valentin Zubkov, Nikolai Novlyansky	Drama	Entered into the 1959 Cannes Film Festival
Ivan Brovkin on the State Farm	Иван Бровкин на целине	Ivan Lukinsky	Leonid Kharitonov, Tatyana Pelttser	Comedy	
Letter Never Sent	Неотправленное письмо	Mikhail Kalatozov	Tatyana Samojlova, Innokenti Smoktunovsky, Galina Kozhakina, Vasili Livanov	Adventure drama	Entered into the 1960 Cannes Film Festival
May Stars	Майские звезды	Stanislav Rostotsky	Aleksandr Khanov	War	
Mumu	Муму	Anatoliy Bobrovskiy and Evgeniy Teterin	Afanasi Kochetkov	Drama	
The Overcoat	Шинель	Aleksey Batalov	Rolan Bykov, Yuri Tolubeyev, Aleksandra Yozhkina, Elena Ponsova	Drama	
People on the Bridge	Люди на мосту	Aleksandr Zarkhi	Vasili Merkuryev	Drama	
Sampo	Сампо	Aleksandr Ptushko, Risto Orko	Urho Somersalmi, Ivan Voronov, Anna Orochko	Fantasy	Finnish-Soviet co-production
A Snow Fairy Tale	Снежная сказка	Aleksei Sakharov, Eldar Shengelaia	Igor Yershov	Fantasy	
The Unamenables	Неподдающиеся	Yuri Chulyukin	Nadezhda Rumyantseva, Yuri Belov, Aleksei Kozhevnikov	Comedy	
There Will Be No Leave Today	Сегодня увольнения не будет	Andrei Tarkovsky	Oleg Borisov	Drama	
Vasily Surikov	Василий Суриков	Anatoli Rybakov	Evgeniy Lazarev	Drama	
Virgin Soil Upturned	Поднятая целина	Aleksandr Ivanov	Yevgeny Matveyev	Drama	Adaptation of Mikhail Sholokhov novel
White Nights	Белые ночи	Ivan Pyryev	Lyudmila Marchenko	Drama	
The Wind	Ветер	Aleksandr Alov and Vladimir Naumov	Eduard Bredun	Drama	

== See also ==
- 1959 in the Soviet Union
