= 1959 in art =

Events from the year 1959 in art.

== Events ==
- June 10 – National Museum of Western Art established in Tokyo.
- André Breton asks Salvador Dalí, Joan Miró, Enrique Tábara and Eugenio Granell to represent Spain by exhibiting some of their works in the Homage to Surrealism Exhibition celebrating the fortieth anniversary of Surrealism.

== Awards ==
- Archibald Prize: William Dobell – Dr Edward MacMahon
- John Moores Painting Prize - Patrick Heron for "Black Painting - Red, Brown and Olive : July 1959"
- Knighthood (United Kingdom): Stanley Spencer

== Works ==
- Milton Avery – Tangerine Moon and Wine Dark Sea
- José de Creeft – Alice in Wonderland
- Salvador Dalí – The Discovery of America by Christopher Columbus
- Ivan Generalić – The Deer Wedding
- Allan Gwynne-Jones – Lord Beveridge in his 80th year
- Barbara Hepworth – Figure (Archaean) (bronze, 7 casts)
- Asger Jorn – Solvejg
- Alex Katz - Double Portrait of Robert Rauschenberg
- Franz Kline – Orange and Black Wall
- Lee Krasner – Cool White
- Peter Lanyon – Lost Mine
- Georg J. Lober – Statue of George M. Cohan (bronze)
- Elmer Petersen – "World's Largest Buffalo" in Jamestown, North Dakota
- Pablo Picasso – Le déjeuner sur l'herbe
- Nikolai Pozdneev – Spring Day
- Ad Reinhardt – Abstract Painting Diptych
- Stanley Spencer – Self-portrait
- Frank Stella - Die Fahne Hoch!

== Publications ==
- John Golding – Cubism: a history and an analysis, 1907-1914

== Births ==
- January 17 – Herbert Brandl, Austrian painter (died 2025)
- June 2 – Rineke Dijkstra, Dutch photographer
- July 10 – Rob Gonsalves, Canadian surrealist painter (died 2017)
- August 27 – Juan Fernando Cobo, Colombian artist (died 2024)
- November 11 – Celia Paul, British painter known for self-portraits
- date unknown
  - Willie Doherty, Northern Irish visual artist
  - Caio Fonseca, American painter
  - Joël Guenoun, French typographic artist and designer
  - Peter Lik, Australian-born landscape photographer

== Deaths ==
- January – Eva Frankfurther, German-born British portrait painter, suicide (born 1930)
- January 29 – Winifred Brunton, South African painter and illustrator (born 1880)
- February 26 – Gabrielle Renard, French artist's model (born 1878)
- February 28 – Beatrix Farrand, American landscape architect (born 1872)
- April 9 – Frank Lloyd Wright, American architectural pioneer (born 1867)
- May 3 – Renato Birolli, Italian painter (born 1905)
- June 8 – Pietro Canonica, Italian sculptor (born 1869)
- July 6 – George Grosz, German painter, draftsman and caricaturist (born 1893)
- July 17 – Sir Alfred Munnings, English equine painter (born 1878)
- August 5 – Frank Godwin, American illustrator (born 1889)
- August 19 – Sir Jacob Epstein, American-born British sculptor (born 1880)
- August 20 – Alfred Kubin, Austrian illustrator (born 1877)
- August 27 – Tom Purvis, English poster artist (born 1888).
- September 9
  - Merric Boyd, Australian painter, sculptor and ceramic artist (born 1888)
  - Cathleen Mann, English portrait painter and costume designer (born 1896)
- September 13 – Adrian (Greenberg), Hollywood costume designer (born 1903)
- September 18
  - Benjamin Péret, French poet, Dadaist and editor of La Révolution surréaliste (born 1899)
  - Adolf Ziegler, German painter and politician (born 1892)
- September 29 – Matthew Smith, English painter (born 1879)
- October 6 – Bernard Berenson, Lithuanian American art historian (born 1865)
- November 15 – Charles Jones, English gardener and photographer (born 1866)
- November 18 – Arkady Shaikhet, Soviet documentary photographer (born 1898)
- November 24 – Stepan Erzia, Mordvin sculptor (born 1876)
- December 9 – Gene Carr, American cartoonist (born 1881)
- December 14
  - Lizzy Ansingh, Dutch painter (born 1875)
  - Sir Stanley Spencer, English painter (born 1891)

== See also ==
- 1959 in fine arts of the Soviet Union
