= 1959 in the Soviet Union =

- Decades: 1930s; 1940s; 1950s; 1960s; 1970s
- See also: History of the Soviet Union; List of years in the Soviet Union

The following lists events that happened during 1959 in the Union of Soviet Socialist Republics.

== Incumbents ==
- First Secretary of the Communist Party of the Soviet Union – Nikita Khrushchev
- Chairman of the Presidium of the Supreme Soviet of the Soviet Union – Kliment Voroshilov
- Chairman of the Council of Ministers of the Soviet Union – Nikita Khrushchev

== Events ==
=== January ===
- January 2 – The Soviet Union successfully launched the Luna 1 satellite from Baikonur Cosmodrome. Luna 1 became the first man-made object to escape the pull of the Earth's gravity.
- January 4 – At 0259 GMT, the Luna 1 satellite became the first man-made object to pass the moon on its way to solar orbit as the first artificial planet. President Eisenhower congratulated Soviet scientist on achieving "a great stride forward in man's advance into the infinite reaches of outer space", while House leader John W. McCormack commented that "it is time America awoke to its peril".
- January 20 – Soviet Foreign Minister Anastas Mikoyan returned to Moscow after a controversial 17-day tour of the United States.
- January 27 – The 21st Congress of the Communist Party of the Soviet Union was opened at Sverdlovsky Hall in Moscow as Nikita Khrushchev welcomed 1,500 delegates, including Communist leaders from 70 nations. For the first time, Western reporters were admitted to the conclave, held for the first time since 1956.

=== February ===
- February 2 – Nine hikers died mysteriously while on an expedition in the Ural Mountains of Russia.
- February 5 – The U.S. State Department released tapes that showed that Soviet jets had shot down an unarmed American Lockheed C-130 transport plane on September 2, 1958. Transmissions between the two fighter planes, identified as "201" and "218", had been intercepted in Turkey. The Soviets denounced the tapes as a "clumsy fake". On the same day, Soviet Premier Nikita S. Khrushchev invited U.S. President Dwight D. Eisenhower to visit Moscow, adding that he could bring anyone, and go anywhere, he chose. In his speech, Khrushchev referred to U.S. Secretary of State John Foster Dulles and proclaimed, "Mr. Dulles, if you so desire, then for the sake of ending the Cold War, we are even prepared to admit your victory in this war that is unwanted by the peoples. Regard yourselves, gentlemen, as victors in this war, but end it quickly."
- February 28 – At 1:49 PST, Discoverer 1 was launched from Vandenberg Air Force Base to serve as a "north–south polar satellite". The launch was actually the first of the Project CORONA reconnaissance satellites used by the CIA to spy on the Soviet Union. The first launch, and the next 11, were failures. A declassified CIA report concluded that "Today, most people believe the DISCOVERER I landed somewhere near the South Pole."

== Births ==
- 27 June – Hennadiy Kernes, Ukrainian politician (d. 2020)
- 20 October – Alexander Mironenko, Soviet airborne sergeant, Hero of the Soviet Union (d. 1980)

== Deaths ==
- February 13 – Al Altaev, children's book author
- February 25 – Klawdziy Duzh-Dushewski, architect, diplomat and journalist
- March 15 – Shalva Dadiani, novelist
- March 17 – Galaktion Tabidze, poet
- March 30 – Daniil Andreyev, writer and mystic
- July 2 – Sergei Chetverikov, geneticist
- September 20 – Nikandr Chibisov, military commander
- October 23 – Sergei Agababov, composer
- November 3 – Fyodor Bogorodsky, artist
- November 6 – Ivan Leonidov, architect

== See also ==
- 1959 in fine arts of the Soviet Union
- List of Soviet films of 1959
