= 1959 in film =

The year 1959 in film involved some significant events, with Ben-Hur winning a record 11 Academy Awards, as well as the releases of two acclaimed films, North by Northwest and Some Like It Hot.

== Top-grossing films (U.S.) ==
The top ten 1959 released films by box office gross in North America are as follows:

Highest-grossing films of 1959
Rank	Title	Distributor	Domestic rentals
1	Ben-Hur	MGM	$36,000,000
2	The Shaggy Dog	Buena Vista	$9,600,000
3	Operation Petticoat	Universal	$9,321,555
4	Some Like It Hot	United Artists	$8,127,835
5	Pillow Talk	Universal	$7,669,713
6	Imitation of Life	Universal	$6,417,807
7	Suddenly, Last Summer	Columbia	$6,375,000
8	Rio Bravo; The Nun's Story	Warner Bros.	$5,750,000
9	North by Northwest	MGM	$5,740,000
10	Anatomy of a Murder	Columbia	$5,500,000

== Events ==
- January 23 – Republic Pictures releases its last production, Plunderers of Painted Flats.
- January 29 – Walt Disney releases his 16th animated film, Sleeping Beauty in Beverly Hills. It is Disney's first animated film to be shown in 70mm and modern 6-track stereophonic sound, (Note: Fantasia had also used a multi-speaker stereophonic sound system, but it was primitive compared to the one used in Sleeping Beauty.) but its last fairytale adaptation until 1985. Also on the program is Disney's new "pictorial interpretation" Grand Canyon, which uses the music of Ferde Grofé's Grand Canyon Suite. Grand Canyon wins an Academy Award for Best Documentary (Short Subject).
- April 30 – François Truffaut's The 400 Blows opens the 1959 Cannes Film Festival bringing international attention to the French New Wave.
- June 4 – The Three Stooges release their 190th and last short film, Sappy Bull Fighters.
- June 7 – A contract between Paramount and Jerry Lewis Productions is signed specifying a payment of $10 million plus 60% of the profits for 14 films over a seven-year period. This contract makes Lewis the highest paid individual Hollywood talent to date and is unprecedented in that he has unlimited creative control, including final cut, and the return of film rights after 30 years.
- July 1 - Herbert J. Yates, founder of Republic Pictures, sells his controlling stake in the company.
- July – Les Cousins, another film of the French New Wave, wins the Golden Bear at the 9th Berlin International Film Festival.
- July 22 – Joseph E. Levine promotes the release of Hercules in the United States starring Steve Reeves which popularizes the sword and sandals genre.
- August 4 – The Big Fisherman is the first film released in Super Panavision 70.
- September 30 – The film of Mise Éire, made by George Morrison for Gael Linn, is premiered to close the Cork Film Festival, the first feature-length Irish language film.
- October 7 – Rock Hudson, who is later voted top in the Top Ten Money Making Stars Poll for the year, appears in Pillow Talk alongside Doris Day for the first time.
- October 14 – Legendary Australian-born actor Errol Flynn dies of a heart attack in Vancouver, Canada at the age of 50.
- November 18 – William Wyler's Ben-Hur, the most expensive film up to this date with a budget of $15,175,000, premieres at Loew's State Theatre (New York City). It goes on to win a record 11 Academy Awards. Principal photography had wrapped on January 7 with filming the last shots of the crucifixion scene at Cinecittà in Rome.
- December 2 – The battle of the smellies starts with the release of the documentary Behind the Great Wall in AromaRama, with scents pumped into the theater during the film.

== Awards ==
Category/Organization	17th Golden Globe Awards March 10, 1960		12th BAFTA Awards March 26, 1960	32nd Academy Awards April 4, 1960
Category/Organization	Comedy or Musical	Drama	12th BAFTA Awards March 26, 1960	32nd Academy Awards April 4, 1960
Best Film	Some Like It Hot (Comedy); Porgy and Bess (Musical)	Ben-Hur	Room at the Top	Ben-Hur
Best Director	William Wyler; Ben-Hur		-	William Wyler; Ben-Hur
Best Actor	Jack Lemmon; Some Like It Hot	Anthony Franciosa; Career	Sidney Poitier; The Defiant Ones	Charlton Heston; Ben-Hur
Best Actress	Marilyn Monroe; Some Like It Hot	Elizabeth Taylor; Suddenly, Last Summer	Simone Signoret; Room at the Top	Simone Signoret; Room at the Top
Best Supporting Actor	Stephen Boyd; Ben-Hur		-	Hugh Griffith; Ben-Hur
Best Supporting Actress	Susan Kohner; Imitation of Life		-	Shelley Winters; The Diary of Anne Frank
Best Screenplay, Adapted	Room at the Top; Neil Paterson		Orders to Kill; Paul Dehn	Room at the Top; Neil Paterson
Best Screenplay, Original	Room at the Top; Neil Paterson		Orders to Kill; Paul Dehn	Pillow Talk; Russell Rouse, Clarence Greene, Stanley Shapiro, and Maurice Richlin

Palme d'Or (Cannes Film Festival):

Black Orpheus (Orfeu Negro), directed by Marcel Camus, France

Golden Lion (Venice Film Festival):

Il Generale della Rovere (General della Rovere), directed by Roberto Rossellini, Italy / France
La grande guerra (The Great War), directed by Mario Monicelli, Italy / France

Golden Bear (Berlin Film Festival):

Les Cousins (The Cousins), directed by Claude Chabrol, France

== 1959 film releases ==
United States unless stated

=== January–March ===
- January 1959
  - 2 January
    - Kaagaz Ke Phool (India)
  - 6 January
    - The Captain's Table
  - 13 January
    - Guns, Girls and Gangsters
  - 16 January
    - Anari (India)
  - 22 January
    - Room at the Top (Britain)
    - The Tiger of Eschnapur (West Germany)
  - 25 January
    - The Law (Italy)
  - 28 January
    - The Trap
  - 29 January
    - Sleeping Beauty
- February 1959
  - 11 February
    - The Hanging Tree
  - 12 February
    - The Black Orchid
  - 15 February
    - No Name on the Bullet
    - Ride Lonesome
  - 17 February
    - House on Haunted Hill
  - 19 February
    - The Journey
  - 22 February
    - Model for Murder
  - 24 February
    - Make Mine a Million (Britain)
  - 26 February
    - City of Fear
- March 1959
  - 3 March
    - The Giant Behemoth
    - A Stranger in My Arms
  - 4 March
    - Up Periscope
  - 5 March
    - Carry On Nurse (Britain)
  - 6 March
    - Breakout
  - 8 March
    - Too Many Crooks (Britain)
  - 10 March
    - Carlton-Browne of the F.O. (Britain)
  - 11 March
    - Les Cousins (France)
  - 12 March
    - The 39 Steps
  - 18 March
    - The Diary of Anne Frank
    - The Sad Horse
  - 19 March
    - Green Mansions
    - The Shaggy Dog
  - 20 March
    - Alias Jesse James
  - 25 March
    - Al Capone
    - Tiger Bay (Britain)
  - 29 March
    - Honeymoon (Britain/Spain)
    - Some Like It Hot

=== April–June ===
- April 1959
  - 1 April
    - Compulsion
    - Warlock
  - 4 April
    - Rio Bravo
  - 6 April
    - The Sound and the Fury
  - 8 April
    - Thunder in the Sun
  - 10 April
    - Gidget
  - 14 April
  - 16 April
    - Court Martial (West Germany)
  - 21 April
    - Sapphire (Britain)
  - 23 April
    - Count Your Blessings
    - The World, the Flesh and the Devil
  - 25 April
    - A Home for Tanya (USSR)
    - Westbound
  - 29 April
    - The Mating Game
  - 30 April
    - Imitation of Life
- May 1959
  - 1 May
    - The World of Apu (India)
  - 2 May
    - The Sign of Leo (France)
  - 4 May
    - The 400 Blows (France)
    - The Hound of the Baskervilles (Britain)
  - 8 May
    - These Thousand Hills
  - 9 May
    - There Will Be No Leave Today (USSR)
  - 12 May
    - Face of a Fugitive
    - Good Morning (Japan)
  - 14 May
    - Serious Charge (Britain)
  - 19 May
    - The Young Philadelphians
  - 21 May
    - Ask Any Girl
    - Shake Hands with the Devil (U.S./Ireland)
  - 23 May
    - Little Greaser
  - 27 May
    - The Wild and the Innocent
    - Woman Obsessed
  - 29 May
    - The Man in the Net
    - Pork Chop Hill
- June 1959
  - 4 June
    - Nazarín (Mexico)
  - 10 June
    - Hiroshima Mon Amour (France/Japan)
  - 12 June
    - Black Orpheus (Brazil/France/Italy)
    - The Horse Soldiers
  - 16 June
    - Don't Give Up The Ship
    - John Paul Jones
    - Ten Seconds to Hell
  - 17 June
    - The Hangman
    - Middle of the Night
  - 18 June
    - The Five Pennies
    - Say One for Me
    - Teenagers from Outer Space
    - This Happy Feeling
  - 24 June
    - Porgy and Bess
  - 25 June
    - The Giant Gila Monster
    - The Killer Shrews
  - 26 June
    - Darby O'Gill and the Little People (With Donald in Mathmagic Land released with it)
    - This Earth Is Mine
  - 27 June
    - Letter Never Sent (USSR)

=== July–September ===
- July 1959
  - 1 July
    - North by Northwest
  - 2 July
    - Anatomy of a Murder
  - 3 July
    - The Beat Generation
    - The Heart of a Man
    - Return of the Fly
  - 5 July
    - The Big Circus
  - 8 July
    - Tarzan's Greatest Adventure
  - 11 July
    - Yesterday's Enemy
  - 14 July
    - The Legend of Tom Dooley
  - 15 July
    - A Hole in the Head
  - 16 July
    - The Alligator People
  - 17 July
    - The Mouse That Roared (Britain)
  - 18 July
    - The Nun's Story
  - 20 July
    - Day of the Outlaw
  - 22 July
    - Plan 9 from Outer Space
  - 24 July
    - Holiday for Lovers
  - 29 July
    - The Angry Hills
    - Last Train from Gun Hill
    - The Tingler
  - 30 July
    - Blue Denim
- August 1959
  - 4 August
    - The Big Fisherman
  - 5 August
    - It Happened to Jane
  - 6 August
    - The 30 Foot Bride of Candy Rock
    - The Scapegoat (Britain)
  - 9 August
    - The Bat
  - 11 August
    - The Big Operator
  - 13 August
    - I'm All Right Jack (Britain)
  - 19 August
    - But Not for Me
    - It Started with a Kiss
  - 20 August
    - The Devil's Disciple (U.S./Britain)
  - 22 August
    - Fate of a Man (USSR)
  - 24 August
    - Sampo (USSR/Finland)
- September 1959
  - 3 September
    - Carry On Teacher (Britain)
  - 4 September
    - The Blue Angel
  - 9 September
    - Les liaisons dangereuses (France)
  - 10 September
    - The Great St. Louis Bank Robbery
  - 11 September
    - That Kind of Woman
  - 12 September
    - Battle Beyond the Sun (USSR)
  - 15 September
    - Look Back in Anger (Britain)
  - 16 September
    - Jet Storm (Britain)
  - 18 September
    - Dil Deke Dekho (India)
  - 24 September
    - Killers of Kilimanjaro
  - 25 September
    - The Great War (Italy)
    - The Mummy (Britain)
  - 26 September
    - General Della Rovere (Italy)

=== October–December ===
- October 1959
  - 3 October
    - A Bucket of Blood
    - Girls Town
  - 6 October
    - Pillow Talk
  - 7 October
    - 4D Man
    - Career
    - North West Frontier
  - 8 October
    - The Nightingale's Prayer (Egypt)
  - 9 October
    - The Best of Everything
  - 15 October
    - Odds Against Tomorrow
    - The Roots of Heaven
  - 16 October
    - Two Men in Manhattan (France)
  - 18 October
    - The Crimson Kimono
  - 21 October
    - The FBI Story
    - They Came to Cordura
    - The Wonderful Country
  - 22 October
    - The Bridge (West Germany)
    - The Last Angry Man
  - 23 October
    - Libel (Britain)
  - 25 October
    - The Three Treasures (Japan)
  - 27 October
    - Solomon and Sheba
  - 30 October
    - Paigham (India)
    - The Wasp Woman
- November 1959
  - 2 November
    - Edge of Eternity
  - 3 November
    - Fires on the Plain (Japan)
  - 4 November
    - Jet Over the Atlantic
  - 6 November
    - The Wreck of the Mary Deare (U.S./Britain)
  - 10 November
    - Happy Anniversary
    - Third Man on the Mountain
  - 11 November
    - The Facts of Murder (Italy)
    - Shadows
    - Yellowstone Kelly
  - 12 November
    - The Miracle
    - The Soldiers of Pancho Villa (Mexico)
  - 13 November
    - Estate Violenta (Italy/France)
  - 14 November
    - Bad Girls Don't Cry (Italy)
    - Insan Jaag Utha (India)
  - 17 November
    - Beloved Infidel
  - 18 November
    - Ben-Hur
    - A Summer Place
  - 22 November
    - Timbuktu
  - 23 November
    - The Angry Red Planet
  - 29 November
    - The Atomic Submarine
  - 30 November
    - The Man Who Could Cheat Death (Britain)
- December 1959
  - 1 December
    - 1001 Arabian Nights
    - Ballad of a Soldier (USSR)
    - The Rookie
  - 5 December
    - Republic of Sin (France/Mexico)
    - Operation Petticoat
  - 7 December
    - Never So Few
  - 11 December
    - Expresso Bongo (Britain)
    - Li'l Abner
    - SOS Pacific (Britain)
  - 12 December
    - Hannibal (Italy)
    - Terror Is a Man (U.S./Philippines)
  - 15 December
    - Follow a Star (Britain)
  - 16 December
    - Blessings of the Land (Philippines)
    - The Gazebo
    - Journey to the Center of the Earth
    - Pickpocket (France)
    - The Shakedown
  - 17 December
    - On the Beach
  - 18 December
    - We are Altogether Crazy (Denmark)
  - 20 December
    - A Dog's Best Friend
    - Suddenly, Last Summer
  - 21 December
    - Tommy the Toreador (Britain)
  - 25 December
    - Magic Boy (Japan)
  - 26 December
    - Battle in Outer Space (Japan)
  - 28 December
    - Come Dance with Me (France/Italy)
  - 30 December
    - Our Man in Havana (Britain)
  - 31 December
    - The Adventures of Buratino (USSR)

== Notable films released in 1959 ==
United States unless stated

=== # ===
- 4D Man, starring Robert Lansing and Lee Meriwether
- The 30 Foot Bride of Candy Rock, starring Lou Costello and Dorothy Provine
- The 39 Steps, starring Kenneth More – (Britain)
- The 400 Blows (Les Quatre Cents Coups), directed by François Truffaut, starring Jean-Pierre Léaud – (France)Nights
- 1001 Arabian Nights, animated film directed by Jack Kinney.

=== A ===
- The Adventures of Buratino (Priklyucheniya Buratino) – (USSR)
- Al Capone, starring Rod Steiger
- Alias Jesse James, starring Bob Hope
- The Alligator People, starring Beverly Garland
- Anari, starring Raj Kapoor – (India)
- Anatomy of a Murder, directed by Otto Preminger, starring James Stewart, Lee Remick, Ben Gazzara, Eve Arden, Arthur O'Connell, Kathryn Grant, George C. Scott
- The Angry Hills, starring Robert Mitchum and Gia Scala
- The Angry Red Planet (aka Invasion of Mars), starring Gerald Mohr
- Argument About Basia (Awantura o Basię) – (Poland)

=== B ===
- Bad Girls Don't Cry (La notte brava), starring Rosanna Schiaffino – (Italy)
- Ballad of a Soldier (Ballada o soldate), directed by Grigory Chukhray – (USSR)
- The Bat, starring Vincent Price and Agnes Moorehead
- Battle Beyond the Sun (Nebo zovet) – (USSR)
- Battle in Outer Space, directed by Ishirō Honda – (Japan)
- The Battle of the Sexes, starring Peter Sellers – (Britain)
- The Beat Generation, starring Steve Cochran and Mamie Van Doren
- Beloved Infidel, starring Gregory Peck and Deborah Kerr
- Ben-Hur, directed by William Wyler, starring Charlton Heston, Stephen Boyd, Jack Hawkins – winner of 11 Academy Awards and 4 Golden Globes
- The Best of Everything, starring Hope Lange, Diane Baker, Suzy Parker, Stephen Boyd, Joan Crawford
- The Big Circus, starring Victor Mature, Rhonda Fleming, Red Buttons, Gilbert Roland, Kathryn Grant
- The Big Fisherman, starring Howard Keel
- The Big Operator, starring Mickey Rooney, Steve Cochran, Mamie Van Doren
- The Birth of Japan (Nippon Tanjō), starring Toshiro Mifune – (Japan)
- Black Orpheus, directed by Marcel Camus – winner of Palme d'Or, Golden Globe, Oscar and Bafta – (Brazil/France/Italy)
- Blessings of the Land (Biyaya ng lupa), starring Rosa Rosal – (Philippines)
- Breakout, starring Hazel Court
- The Bridge (Die Brücke), directed by Bernhard Wicki – (West Germany)
- A Bucket of Blood, directed by Roger Corman
- But Not for Me, directed by Walter Lang, starring Clark Gable, Carroll Baker, Lee J. Cobb

=== C ===
- The Captain's Table, starring John Gregson and Peggy Cummins – (Britain)
- Career, starring Dean Martin, Shirley MacLaine, Anthony Franciosa
- Carlton-Browne of the F.O., starring Peter Sellers, Terry-Thomas, John Le Mesurier – (Britain)
- Carry On Nurse, starring Shirley Eaton and Kenneth Connor – (Britain)
- Carry On Teacher, starring Kenneth Connor and Leslie Phillips – (Britain)
- The Chasers (Jakten) – (Norway)
- City of Fear, score by Jerry Goldsmith
- Come Dance with Me, starring Brigitte Bardot – (France/Italy)
- Compulsion, starring Orson Welles, Bradford Dillman, Dean Stockwell, Diane Varsi, E. G. Marshall
- Court Martial (Kriegsgericht) – (West Germany)
- Les Cousins, directed by Claude Chabrol – (France)
- The Crimson Kimono, directed by Samuel Fuller, starring James Shigeta

=== D ===
- Danger Within, starring Richard Todd, Bernard Lee, Richard Attenborough – (Britain)
- Darby O'Gill and the Little People, starring Sean Connery
- Date With Death, starring Gerald Mohr
- Day of the Outlaw, starring Robert Ryan, Tina Louise, Burl Ives
- The Death Ship (Das Totenschiff), starring Horst Buchholz – (West Germany)
- Destiny of a Man (Sudba cheloveka), directed by Sergei Bondarchuk – (USSR)
- The Devil's Disciple, starring Laurence Olivier, Burt Lancaster, Kirk Douglas – (U.S./Britain)
- The Diary of Anne Frank, directed by George Stevens, starring Millie Perkins, Joseph Schildkraut, Shelley Winters, Richard Beymer, Diane Baker, Ed Wynn
- Dil Deke Dekho, starring Shammi Kapoor – (India)
- Donald in Mathmagic Land (short subject)
- Don't Give Up The Ship, starring Jerry Lewis
- Dust on the Brain (Støv på hjernen) – (Norway)

=== E ===
- Expresso Bongo, starring Laurence Harvey and Cliff Richard – (Britain)

=== F ===
- The FBI Story, starring James Stewart
- Face of a Fugitive, starring Fred MacMurray
- The Facts of Murder (Un maledetto imbroglio), directed by and starring Pietro Germi with Claudia Cardinale – (Italy)
- La fièvre monte à El Pao (Fever Mounts at El Pao), directed by Luis Buñuel – (France/Mexico)
- Fires on the Plain (Nobi), directed by Kon Ichikawa – (Japan)
- The Five Pennies, starring Danny Kaye
- Floating Weeds (Ukikusa), directed by Yasujirō Ozu – (Japan)
- Follow a Star, starring Norman Wisdom, Ron Moody, Hattie Jacques – (Britain)
- Forbidden Women, directed by Mahmoud Zulfikar, starring Salah Zulfikar and Huda Sultan – (Egypt)

=== G ===
- The Gazebo, starring Glenn Ford, Debbie Reynolds, Carl Reiner
- Il Generale della Rovere, directed by Roberto Rossellini, starring Vittorio De Sica – (Italy)
- The Giant Behemoth, starring Gene Evans and André Morell
- Gidget, starring Sandra Dee
- Girls Town, starring Mamie Van Doren
- Good Morning (Ohayō), directed by Yasujirō Ozu – (Japan)
- La grande guerra (The Great War), directed by Mario Monicelli, starring Alberto Sordi and Vittorio Gassman – (Italy)
- The Gunfight at Dodge City, starring Joel McCrea
- Guns, Girls and Gangsters, directed by Edward L. Cahn

=== H ===
- The Hanging Tree, directed by Delmer Daves, starring Gary Cooper, Karl Malden, George C. Scott
- The Hangman, starring Robert Taylor and Tina Louise
- Hannibal, starring Victor Mature and Rita Gam
- Happy Anniversary, starring David Niven and Mitzi Gaynor
- Have Rocket, Will Travel, starring Moe Howard, Larry Fine and Joe De Rita
- The Heart of a Man, starring Frankie Vaughan and Anne Heywood – (Britain)
- Hiroshima Mon Amour, directed by Alain Resnais – (France/Japan)
- A Hole in the Head, starring Frank Sinatra, Edward G. Robinson, Carolyn Jones, Eddie Hodges
- Holiday for Lovers, starring Jane Wyman, Clifton Webb, Jill St. John
- A Home for Tanya (Otchiy dom) – (USSR)
- Honeymoon (Luna de miel), directed by Michael Powell – (Britain/Spain)
- The Horse Soldiers, starring John Wayne, William Holden, Constance Towers
- The Hound of the Baskervilles (British), a Sherlock Holmes mystery directed by Terence Fisher for Hammer Films, starring Peter Cushing as Holmes, Andre Morell as Watson and Christopher Lee as Sir Henry Baskerville – (Britain)
- House on Haunted Hill, starring Vincent Price

=== I ===
- I'm All Right Jack, directed by the Boulting Brothers, starring Peter Sellers and Ian Carmichael – (Britain)
- Imitation of Life, directed by Douglas Sirk, starring Lana Turner, John Gavin, Sandra Dee, Susan Kohner, Juanita Moore
- The Immoral Mr. Teas, directed by Russ Meyer
- The Indian Tomb, directed by Fritz Lang – (West Germany)
- Insan Jaag Utha, starring Madhubala – (India)
- It Happened to Jane, starring Doris Day, Jack Lemmon, Ernie Kovacs
- It Started with a Kiss, starring Debbie Reynolds and Glenn Ford

=== J ===
- Jazz on a Summer's Day, concert film of the 1958 Newport Jazz Festival, directed by Bert Stern and Aram Avakian
- The Jazz Singer, a television film starring Jerry Lewis
- Jet Over the Atlantic, starring Guy Madison and Virginia Mayo
- Jet Storm, starring Richard Attenborough, Stanley Baker, Diane Cilento, Mai Zetterling – (Britain)
- John Paul Jones, starring Robert Stack
- The Journey, starring Yul Brynner and Deborah Kerr
- Journey to the Center of the Earth, starring James Mason and Pat Boone

=== K ===
- Kaagaz Ke Phool (Paper Flowers), directed by and starring Guru Dutt – (India)
- Kapò, directed by Gillo Pontecorvo, starring Susan Strasberg – (Italy/France/Yugoslavia)
- Killers of Kilimanjaro, starring Robert Taylor, Anthony Newley, Anne Aubrey

=== L ===
- The Last Angry Man, starring Paul Muni
- Last Train from Gun Hill, starring Kirk Douglas, Anthony Quinn, Carolyn Jones, Earl Holliman
- The Law (La Legge), starring Gina Lollobrigida and Yves Montand – (Italy)
- El Lazarillo de Tormes, winner of Golden Bear – (Spain)
- Le signe du lion, directed by Éric Rohmer – (France)
- The Legend of Tom Dooley, starring Michael Landon
- Les liaisons dangereuses, directed by Roger Vadim, starring Jeanne Moreau – (France)
- Letter Never Sent (Neotpravlennoye pismo) – (USSR)
- Little Greaser
- Libel, directed by Anthony Asquith, starring Dirk Bogarde and Olivia de Havilland – (Britain)
- Li'l Abner, directed by Melvin Frank, starring Peter Palmer, Leslie Parrish, Stella Stevens, Julie Newmar, Stubby Kaye
- Look Back in Anger, directed by Tony Richardson, starring Richard Burton and Claire Bloom – (Britain)

=== M ===
- Magic Boy (Shōnen Sarutobi Sasuke) – Japanese animated film
- Maigret et l'affaire Saint-Fiacre, directed by Jean Delannoy, starring Jean Gabin – (France)
- Make Mine a Million, directed by Lance Comfort and starring Arthur Askey and Sid James – (Britain)
- The Man in the Net, directed by Michael Curtiz, starring Alan Ladd and Carolyn Jones
- The Man Who Could Cheat Death, starring Anton Diffring and Hazel Court
- Model for Murder, starring Keith Andes and Hazel Court
- The Master and His Servants (Herren og hans tjenere) – (Norway)
- A Midsummer Night's Dream (Sen noci svatojánské), an animated puppet film by Jiří Trnka – (Czechoslovakia)
- The Miracle, starring Carroll Baker and Roger Moore
- Mise Éire – (Ireland)
- The Mouse That Roared, starring Peter Sellers and Jean Seberg – (Britain)
- The Mummy, starring Peter Cushing and Christopher Lee – (Britain)
- My Second Brother, directed by Shōhei Imamura – (Japan)

=== N ===
- Nazarín, directed by Luis Buñuel – (Mexico)
- Never So Few, starring Frank Sinatra, Gina Lollobrigida, Peter Lawford, Steve McQueen
- Night Train (Pociąg) – (Poland)
- The Nightingale's Prayer (Doaa al-Karawan) – (Egypt)
- No Name on the Bullet, starring Audie Murphy
- North by Northwest, directed by Alfred Hitchcock, starring Cary Grant, Eva Marie Saint, James Mason
- North West Frontier, aka Flame Over India, starring Kenneth More and Lauren Bacall – (Britain)
- The Nun's Story, directed by Fred Zinnemann, starring Audrey Hepburn

=== O ===
- Odd Obsession (Kagi), directed by Kon Ichikawa – (Japan)
- Odds Against Tomorrow, starring Harry Belafonte and Robert Ryan
- On the Beach, directed by Stanley Kramer, starring Gregory Peck, Ava Gardner, Fred Astaire, Anthony Perkins
- Operation Petticoat, starring Cary Grant and Tony Curtis
- Our Man in Havana, directed by Carol Reed, starring Alec Guinness, Maureen O'Hara, Noël Coward, Ernie Kovacs – (Britain)
- The Overcoat (Shinel) – (USSR)

=== P ===
- Paigham, directed by S. S. Vasan, starring Dilip Kumar, Vyjayanthimala, Raaj Kumar, B. Saroja Devi – (India)
- Pickpocket, directed by Robert Bresson – (France)
- Pillow Talk, starring Doris Day and Rock Hudson
- El Pisito (The Little Apartment), directed by Marco Ferreri – (Spain)
- Plan 9 from Outer Space, directed by Edward D. Wood, Jr., starring Tor Johnson, Vampira, Bela Lugosi
- Porgy and Bess, a musical directed by Otto Preminger, starring Sidney Poitier and Dorothy Dandridge, music by George and Ira Gershwin
- Pork Chop Hill, starring Gregory Peck

=== R ===
- The Rest Is Silence (Der Rest ist Schweigen), starring Hardy Krüger – (West Germany)
- Return of the Fly, starring Vincent Price
- Ride Lonesome, starring Randolph Scott
- Rio Bravo, directed by Howard Hawks, starring John Wayne, Dean Martin, Ricky Nelson, Walter Brennan, Angie Dickinson
- The Rookie, starring Julie Newmar, Tommy Noonan, Peter Marshall
- Room at the Top, directed by Jack Clayton, starring Simone Signoret and Laurence Harvey – (Britain)
- The Roots of Heaven, directed by John Huston, starring Errol Flynn, Trevor Howard, Juliette Gréco, Eddie Albert, Orson Welles

=== S ===
- Sampo (The Day the Earth Froze) – (USSR/Finland)
- Sapphire, directed by Basil Dearden – (Britain)
- Say One for Me, starring Bing Crosby, Debbie Reynolds and Robert Wagner
- The Scapegoat, starring Alec Guinness and Bette Davis – (Britain)
- Serious Charge, starring Anthony Quayle – (Britain)
- Shadows, directed by John Cassavetes
- The Shaggy Dog, starring Fred MacMurray, Jean Hagen and Tommy Kirk
- The Shakedown, starring Donald Pleasence and Hazel Court
- Shake Hands with the Devil, starring James Cagney – (U.S./Ireland)
- Sleeping Beauty, animated film produced by Walt Disney
- The Soldiers of Pancho Villa (La cucaracha), starring María Félix and Dolores del Río – (Mexico)
- Solomon and Sheba, starring Yul Brynner and Gina Lollobrigida
- Some Like It Hot, directed by Billy Wilder, starring Marilyn Monroe, Tony Curtis and Jack Lemmon
- SOS Pacific, starring Richard Attenborough – (Britain)
- The Sound and the Fury, starring Yul Brynner and Joanne Woodward
- Stars (Sterne), directed by Konrad Wolf – (East Germany/Bulgaria)
- A Stranger in My Arms, starring Jeff Chandler, June Allyson, Mary Astor and Sandra Dee
- Suddenly, Last Summer, directed by Joseph L. Mankiewicz, starring Elizabeth Taylor, Montgomery Clift and Katharine Hepburn
- A Summer Place, starring Troy Donahue and Sandra Dee

=== T ===
- Tarzan's Greatest Adventure, directed by John Guillermin, starring Gordon Scott, Anthony Quayle, Sean Connery
- Telegrame – (Romania)
- Ten Seconds to Hell, directed by Robert Aldrich, starring Jack Palance
- Terror Is a Man, starring Francis Lederer – (U.S./Philippines)
- That Kind of Woman, directed by Sidney Lumet, starring Sophia Loren and Tab Hunter
- The Unknown Woman, directed by Mahmoud Zulfikar, starring Shadia, Shoukry Sarhan and Kamal El-Shennawi – (Egypt)
- There Will Be No Leave Today (Segodnya uvolneniya ne budet), directed by Andrei Tarkovsky – (USSR)
- These Thousand Hills, starring Richard Egan, Don Murray, Lee Remick
- They Came to Cordura, starring Gary Cooper, Rita Hayworth, Van Heflin, Richard Conte, Dick York, Tab Hunter
- Third Man on the Mountain, starring Michael Rennie
- Tiger Bay, starring John Mills and Hayley Mills – (Britain)
- The Tiger of Eschnapur, directed by Fritz Lang – (West Germany)
- The Tingler, starring Vincent Price
- Tommy the Toreador, starring Tommy Steele – (Britain)
- Too Many Crooks, starring Terry-Thomas and George Cole – (Britain)
- Train Without a Timetable (Vlak bez voznog reda) – (Yugoslavia)
- The Trap, starring Richard Widmark, Lee J. Cobb, Earl Holliman, Tina Louise
- Two Men in Manhattan (Deux hommes dans Manhattan), directed by Jean-Pierre Melville – (France)

=== U ===
- Up Periscope, starring James Garner and Edmond O'Brien

=== V ===
- Il vedovo (The Widower), directed by Dino Risi, starring Alberto Sordi – (Italy)
- La vida alrededor (Life Around Us) – (Spain)
- Violent Summer (Estate violenta), starring Jean-Louis Trintignant – (Italy/France)

=== W ===
- Warlock, directed by Edward Dmytryk, starring Henry Fonda, Richard Widmark and Anthony Quinn
- The Wasp Woman, starring Susan Cabot
- We Are Altogether Crazy (Vi er allesammen tossede) – (Denmark)
- Westbound, starring Randolph Scott and Virginia Mayo
- When the Woman Butts In (Kam čert nemůže) – (Czechoslovakia)
- The Wild and the Innocent, starring Audie Murphy, Joanne Dru, Sandra Dee
- Woman Obsessed, starring Susan Hayward
- The Wonderful Country, starring Robert Mitchum and Julie London
- The World, the Flesh and the Devil, starring Harry Belafonte and Inger Stevens
- The World of Apu (Apur Sansar), directed by Satyajit Ray – (India)
- The Wreck of the Mary Deare, starring Gary Cooper and Charlton Heston – (Britain/U.S.)

=== Y ===
- Yellowstone Kelly, starring Clint Walker and Edd Byrnes
- Yesterday's Enemy, directed by Val Guest, starring Stanley Baker – (Britain)
- The Young Philadelphians, starring Paul Newman, Barbara Rush, Brian Keith, Alexis Smith, Robert Vaughn

=== Z ===
- Zorro, the Avenger, feature film released outside of the U.S., compiled from six episodes of the Disney Zorro, the Avenger TV series, starring Guy Williams and Charles Korvin

== Short film series ==
- Looney Tunes (1930–1969)
- Terrytoons (1930–1964)
- Merrie Melodies (1931–1969)
- Bugs Bunny (1940–1964)
- Yosemite Sam (1945–1963)
- Speedy Gonzales (1953–1968)
- The Three Stooges (1934–1959)
- Loopy De Loop (1959–1965)

== Births ==
- January 1 - Adrian Hall, English former actor and co-director
- January 4 - Vanity, Canadian singer, songwriter, model and actress (died 2016)
- January 5 – Clancy Brown, American actor and voice actor
- January 12 - Ralf Moeller, German actor
- January 13 - Alan Taylor, American director
- January 17 – Momoe Yamaguchi, Japanese former actress and singer
- January 21 - Tom Woodruff Jr., American actor, director and producer
- January 22 – Linda Blair, American actress
- January 23
  - Didier Bourdon, French actor, screenwriter and director
  - Robert Funaro, American actor
- January 26 - Herbert Sigüenza, American actor, writer, visual artist and performer
- January 27 - Glenn Taranto, American actor and writer
- January 28 - Frank Darabont, American director, screenwriter and producer
- January 30 - Alex Hyde-White, American actor
- January 31
  - Anthony LaPaglia, Australian actor
  - Kelly Lynch, American actress
- February 1 - Slink Johnson, American rapper, actor and comedian
- February 2 – Laine Mägi, Estonian actress and dancer
- February 3 - Fredric Lehne, American actor
- February 4 – Pamelyn Ferdin, American actress
- February 8 - Henry Czerny, Canadian actor
- February 12 - Sigrid Thornton, Australian actress
- February 15 - Joseph R. Gannascoli, American actor, chef and author
- February 16 - Hazelle Goodman, American actress
- February 18 - Jayne Atkinson, British-American actress
- February 22 – Kyle MacLachlan, American actor
- February 24 - Kasi Lemmons, American director, screenwriter and actress
- March 3
  - Taylor Nichols, American actor
  - Olivier Rabourdin, French actor
- March 5 – Darío Grandinetti, Argentinian actor
- March 6 – Tom Arnold, American actor and comedian
- March 7
  - Donna Murphy, American actress and singer
  - Nick Searcy, American character actor
- March 8 – Aidan Quinn, Irish-American actor
- March 9 – Rodney A. Grant, American actor
- March 11
  - Nina Hartley, American actress
  - Margus Oopkaup, Estonian actor and dramatist (died 2025)
- March 12 - Luenell, American comedian and actress
- March 13 - Bruce Byron, English actor
- March 14
  - Laila Robins, American actress
  - Tamara Tunie, American actress, director and producer
- March 15 – Renny Harlin, Finnish director and producer
- March 16
  - Gary Basaraba, Canadian actor
  - Ludger Pistor, German actor
  - Scott L. Schwartz, American actor, stuntman and professional wrestler (died 2024)
- March 18
  - Luc Besson, French director and producer
  - Irene Cara, American actress and singer (died 2022)
- March 22 – Matthew Modine, American actor
- March 26 – Catherine Keener, American actress
- March 27 - Brian Tarantina, American character actor (died 2019)
- April 1 - Ivan G'Vera, Czech actor
- April 2 - David Frankel, American filmmaker
- April 3
  - David Hyde Pierce, American actor
  - Amy Morton, American actress and director
- April 4 - Phil Morris, American actor and voice actor
- April 10 - Jochen Nickel, German actor
- April 12 - Emilio De Marchi, Italian actor
- April 13 - Jodie Markell, American actress and director
- April 15
  - Emma Thompson, English actress
  - Thomas F. Wilson, American actor, comedian and musician
- April 17
  - Imogen Bain, English actress (died 2014)
  - Sean Bean, English actor
- April 18 - Victoria Wicks, British actress
- April 19 - Patricia Charbonneau, American actress
- April 20
  - Clint Howard, American actor
  - Yuji Okumoto, American actor of Japanese descent
- April 23
  - Tim Blaney, American puppeteer and voice actor
  - Jonathan Sagall, Israeli actor
- April 24 - Glenn Morshower, American character actor
- April 25
  - Clarissa Burt, Italian-American actress
  - Daniel Kash, Canadian actor and director
- April 27 - Neil Pearson, British actor
- May 2 - Lone Scherfig, Danish director and screenwriter
- May 3 - Ben Elton, English comedian, actor and director
- May 10
  - Peter Greene, American actor (d. 2025)
  - Victoria Rowell, American actress
- May 12 - Ving Rhames, American actor
- May 14 - Patrick Bruel, French singer-songwriter, actor and professional poker player
- May 15 - Chris Meledandri, American producer and founder and CEO of Illumination
- May 16 – Mare Winningham, American actress
- May 19 - Jim Ward, American voice actor, radio personality and camera operator (died 2025)
- May 20 - Bronson Pinchot, American actor
- May 21
  - Nick Cassavetes, American actor, director and writer
  - Dana Kimmell, American former actress and model
- May 22 - Linda Emond, American actress
- May 24 - Nula Conwell, English character actress
- May 26 - Kevin Gage, American character actor
- May 29 – Rupert Everett, English actor
- June 4 - Neena Gupta, Indian actress
- June 6
  - Neal H. Moritz, American producer
  - Colin Quinn, American stand-up comedian, actor and writer
- June 7 - Francis Magee, Irish actor
- June 8 - Bernard White, American actor, screenwriter and director
- June 11 – Hugh Laurie, English actor
- June 16 - Willard E. Pugh, American actor
- June 22 – Wayne Federman, American actor and comedian
- June 23 - Duane Whitaker, American character actor
- June 24 - Dan Gilroy, American screenwriter and director
- June 26 - Mark McKinney, Canadian actor and comedian
- June 28 - Chris Doohan, Canadian actor
- June 29 - Charlotte Attenborough, British actress
- June 30 – Vincent D'Onofrio, American actor
- July 2 - Jere Fields, American former actress
- July 3
  - Elisa Gabrielli, American actress
  - Andreas Wisniewski, German actor
- July 7 - Billy Campbell, American actor
- July 8
  - Jean-Philippe Écoffey, Swiss actor
  - Robert Knepper, American actor
  - Pauline Quirke, retired English actress
- July 9 - Kevin Nash, American actor and retired professional wrestler
- July 12 - Charlie Murphy, American actor, comedian and writer (died 2017)
- July 16 - Bob Joles, American voice actor and musician
- July 26
  - Steve Evets, English actor and musician
  - Tom McGowan, American actor
  - Kevin Spacey, American actor
- July 29 – Sanjay Dutt, Indian actor
- August 2
  - Urbain Cancelier, French comedian and actor
  - Jim Doughan, American actor and writer
- August 3 - John C. McGinley, American actor
- August 7 - Deborah Offner, American actress
- August 10 – Rosanna Arquette, American actress
- August 11 - Miguel A. Núñez Jr., American actor
- August 14 – Marcia Gay Harden, American actress
- August 22 - Mark Williams, English actor, presenter and screenwriter
- August 27 - Peter Mensah, Ghanaian-British actor
- August 28
  - Jim Fitzpatrick, American actor, producer, screenwriter and director
  - Brian Thompson, American actor
- August 29 – Rebecca De Mornay, American actress
- September 3 - Merritt Butrick, American actor (died 1989)
- September 9 - Brent Stait, Canadian actor
- September 10
  - Michael Earl, American puppeteer, actor, writer and singer (died 2015)
  - Jim Meskimen, American actor and comedian
  - Peter Nelson, American actor, producer and writer
- September 11 - John Hawkes, American actor
- September 13
  - Dominic Fumusa, American actor
  - Nick Vallelonga, American actor and filmmaker
- September 14
  - Kirk Baltz, American actor
  - Haviland Morris, American actress
- September 15 - Kevin Allen, English actor, director, producer and writer
- September 16 - Peter Keleghan, Canadian actor and writer
- September 18 - Mark Romanek, American director
- September 19
  - Mark Gustafson, American animator and director (died 2024)
  - Carolyn McCormick, American actress
- September 23
  - Jason Alexander, American actor
  - Elizabeth Pena, American actress, writer, panelist and musician (died 2014)
- September 24 - Steve Whitmire, American puppeteer
- September 28
  - Steve Hytner, American actor
  - Giselda Volodi, Italian actress
- October 2 - Kevin Eldon, English actor and comedian
- October 3 – Greg Proops, American actor, stand-up comedian, voice artist and television host
- October 7 - Dylan Baker, American character actor
- October 8 - Brad Greenquist, American actor
- October 9 - Katt Shea, American actress
- October 10
  - Julia Sweeney, American actress, comedian and author
  - Bradley Whitford, American actor and producer
- October 14 - Vincent Riotta, British actor
- October 15 - Todd Solondz, American filmmaker
- October 17 - Norm Macdonald, Canadian stand-up comedian, writer and actor (died 2021)
- October 19 - Peter Appel, American actor
- October 20 - Niamh Cusack, Irish actress
- October 21
  - Tony Ganios, American actor (died 2024)
  - Melora Walters, American actress
  - Ken Watanabe, Japanese actor
- October 22 - Marc Lawrence, American director, screenwriter and producer
- October 23
  - Sam Raimi, American filmmaker and producer
  - Weird Al Yankovic, American singer-songwriter, musician and actor
- October 24 - Brad Johnson, American actor (died 2022)
- October 26 - François Chau, American actor
- October 27 - Mel Gorham, American actress
- October 31 - Michael DeLorenzo, American actor, director, writer, producer and musician
- November 2 - Peter Mullan, Scottish actor and filmmaker
- November 4
  - César Évora, Cuban actor
  - Ken Kirzinger, Canadian actor and stuntman
- November 8
  - Chi Chi LaRue, American director of pornographic films
  - Don McManus, American character actor
- November 9 - Tony Slattery, British actor and comedian (died 2025)
- November 10 - Mackenzie Phillips, American actress and singer
- November 13 - Caroline Goodall, British actress and screenwriter
- November 14 – Paul McGann, English actor
- November 17 - Miyuki Ono, Japanese actress
- November 19 – Allison Janney, American actress
- November 20 – Sean Young, American actress
- November 23
  - Maxwell Caulfield, British-American actor
  - Dominique Dunne, American actress (died 1982)
- November 28 – Judd Nelson, American actor
- November 30
  - Cherie Currie, American singer, musician, actress, and artist
  - Marie Currie, American singer, songwriter, actress, and artist
  - Les Mayfield, American retired director and producer
- December 9 – Mario Cantone, American comedian, writer, actor, singer, and television host
- December 13 – Johnny Whitaker, American actor
- December 14 - Debbie Lee Carrington, American actress and stuntwoman (died 2018)
- December 16
  - Lee Perry, Australian voice actor
  - Larry Poindexter, American actor and singer (died 2026)
- December 21 - Sergio Rubini, Italian actor, director and screenwriter
- December 24
  - Lee Daniels, American producer, director, and screenwriter
  - Perry Lang, American director, writer, and actor
  - Jesús Ochoa, Mexican actor
- December 26 - David Argue, Australian actor (died 2025)
- December 29
  - Patricia Clarkson, American actress
  - Paula Poundstone, American stand-up comedian and actress
  - Brian Sergent, New Zealand actor
- December 30 - Tracey Ullman, British-American actress, comedian, singer, writer, producer and director
- December 31
  - Ronnie del Carmen, Filipino director, animator, and voice actor
  - Val Kilmer, American actor (died 2025)

== Deaths ==
- January 21
  - Cecil B. DeMille, 77, American director and producer, The Ten Commandments, The Greatest Show on Earth
  - Carl Switzer, 31, American singer and actor, Our Gang
- February 1 – Madame Sul-Te-Wan, 85, American actress, King of the Zombies, In Old Chicago
- February 4 – Una O'Connor, 78, Irish actress, Witness for the Prosecution, The Adventures of Robin Hood
- February 5 – Gwili Andre, 51, Danish actress, Secrets of the French Police, No Other Woman
- February 20 – George Archainbaud, 68, French director, Thirteen Women, Girls of the Big House
- February 22 – Helen Parrish, 34, American actress, Too Many Blondes, X Marks the Spot
- March 2 – Eric Blore, 71, British actor, Top Hat, The Lady Eve, The Adventures of Ichabod and Mr. Toad
- March 3 – Lou Costello, 52, American comedian and actor, half of Abbott and Costello comedy team, Africa Screams, Abbott and Costello Meet Frankenstein
- March 26 – Raymond Chandler, 70, American author and screenwriter, The Big Sleep, Double Indemnity
- March 27 – Grant Withers, 54, American actor, My Darling Clementine, Fort Apache
- April 12 – James Gleason, 76, American actor, Here Comes Mr. Jordan, The Bishop's Wife
- April 17 – Cecil Cunningham, 70, American actress, The Awful Truth, Monkey Business
- April 18 – Irving Cummings, 70, American director, Louisiana Purchase, The Dolly Sisters
- May 3 – Troy Sanders, 57, American score arranger and composer, White Christmas, Going My Way
- June 2 – Lyda Borelli, 75, Italian actress, Malombra, The Moth
- June 4 – Charles Vidor, 58, Hungarian director, Gilda, Love Me or Leave Me
- June 16 – George Reeves, 45, American actor, Gone with the Wind, So Proudly We Hail!
- June 18 – Ethel Barrymore, 79, American actress, Portrait of Jennie, The Spiral Staircase
- August 6 – Preston Sturges, 60, American writer, director, Sullivan's Travels, The Lady Eve
- September 6
  - Edmund Gwenn, 81, British actor, Miracle on 34th Street, Mister 880
  - Kay Kendall, 32, British actress, Genevieve, Les Girls
- September 11 – Paul Douglas, 52, American actor, A Letter to Three Wives, It Happens Every Spring
- September 13 – Adrian, 56, American costume designer, The Wizard of Oz, The Women
- September 14 – Wayne Morris, 45, American actor, Kid Galahad, Paths of Glory
- September 25 – Helen Broderick, 68, American actress, Top Hat, Swing Time
- September 30 – Taylor Holmes, 81, American actor, Kiss of Death, Sleeping Beauty
- October 3 – William Bishop, 41, American actor, Harriet Craig, Top Gun
- October 7 – Mario Lanza, 38, American singer and actor, The Great Caruso, Winged Victory
- October 12 – Edward Keane, 75, American actor, Frontier Pony Express, The Roaring Twenties
- October 14 – Errol Flynn, 50, Australian actor, The Adventures of Robin Hood, Captain Blood
- October 21 – Olive Blakeney, 60, American actress, Leave It to Blanche, Don't Get Me Wrong
- October 23 – Gerda Lundequist, 88, Swedish actress, Gosta Berlings Saga
- October 30 – Noel Francis, 53, American actress, Blonde Crazy, I Am a Fugitive from a Chain Gang
- November 7 – Victor McLaglen, 72, British actor, The Quiet Man, Gunga Din
- November 20 – Sylvia Lopez, 26, French actress, Hercules Unchained, Son of the Red Corsair
- November 21 – Max Baer, 50, American boxer and actor, The Prizefighter and the Lady, The Harder They Fall
- November 25 – Gérard Philipe, 36, French actor, Fan-Fan the Tulip, Beauties of the Night
- December 1 – Jose Nepomuceno, 66, Filipino filmmaker and producer, Country Maiden, The Three Humbugs
- December 22 – Gilda Gray, 58, American actress, Aloma of the South Seas, Cabaret
- December 24 – Edmund Goulding, 68, American director, Grand Hotel, The Razor's Edge

== Film debuts ==
- Francesca Annis – The Cat Gang
- Socorro Avelar – Nazarín
- Diane Baker – The Diary of Anne Frank
- Jack Betts – The Bloody Brood
- Michael Callan – They Came to Cordura
- Seymour Cassel – Shadows
- James Coburn – Ride Lonesome
- Michael Constantine – The Last Mile
- Francis Ford Coppola (producer) – Battle Beyond the Sun
- Graham Crowden – The Bridal Path
- Jean-Pierre Darras – Two Men in Manhattan
- Nigel Davenport – Look Back in Anger
- David Doyle – Happy Anniversary
- Sharon Farrell – Kiss Her Goodbye
- Mia Farrow – John Paul Jones
- Don Francks – The Fast Ones
- Jerry Goldsmith (film composer) – Face of a Fugitive
- Richard Harris – Alive and Kicking
- Soad Hosny – Hassan and Na'ima
- Annabella Incontrera – Love Now, Pay Later
- Martin Landau – Pork Chop Hill
- Graciela Lara – The Life of Agustín Lara
- Martin LaSalle – Pickpocket
- Mako – Never So Few
- T. P. McKenna – Broth of a Boy
- John Meillon – On the Beach
- Lee Meriwether – 4D Man
- Tomas Milian – The Big Night
- Jerzy Moes – Lotna
- Nichelle Nichols – Porgy and Bess
- Warren Oates – Up Periscope
- Erzsi Pásztor – Up the Slope
- Millie Perkins – The Diary of Anne Frank
- Michael J. Pollard – It Happened to Jane
- Carl Reiner – Happy Anniversary
- Bert Remsen – Pork Chop Hill
- Jason Robards – The Journey
- Adriana Roel – Mi esposa me comprende
- Connie Sawyer – A Hole in the Head
- Lucille Soong – Ferry to Hong Kong
- Stella Stevens – Say One for Me
- Charles Tyner – That Kind of Woman
- Kazimiera Utrata – Lotna
- Romolo Valli – Policarpo
- Peter Vaughan – The 39 Steps
- Billy Dee Williams – The Last Angry Man
- Clarence Williams III – Pork Chop Hill
- Sven Wollter – Rider in Blue
