= The Circus Princess (disambiguation) =

Die Zirkusprinzessin (The Circus Princess) is an operetta by Emmerich Kálmán.

The Circus Princess may also refer to:

- The Circus Princess (1925 film), a German silent film, based on the operetta
- The Circus Princess (1929 film), a German silent film, based on the operetta
- The Circus Princess (1982 film), a Soviet musical comedy, based on the operetta
- The Circus Princess (TV series), a 2008 Russian telenovela
