= List of Japanese films of 1959 =

A list of films released in Japan in 1959 (see 1959 in film).

Japanese films released in 1959
Title	Director	Cast	Genre	Notes
Across Darkness	Yasuzō Masumura	Hiroshi Kawaguchi, Junko Kanô, Sô Yamamura, Hideo Takamatsu	Crime	
Battle in Outer Space	Ishirō Honda	Ryō Ikebe, Kyoko Anzai, Minoru Takada	Science fiction	
Beauty Is Guilty	Yasuzo Masumura	Ayako Wakao, Fujiko Yamamoto	Romance	
Beni azami				
Enchanted Princess		Ayako Wakao, Raizo Ichikawa	Fantasy	
The Birth of Japan	Hiroshi Inagaki	Yoko Tsukasa		
Fires on the Plain	Kon Ichikawa	Eiji Funakoshi, Osamu Takizawa, Mickey Curtis	War drama	
Floating Weeds	Yasujirō Ozu	Ganjirō Nakamura, Haruko Sugimura, Hiroshi Kawaguchi	Drama	
The Ghost of Yotsuya	Nobuo Nakagawa	Shigeru Amachi, Noriko Kitazawa, Kazuko Wakasugi	—	
Good Morning	Yasujirō Ozu	Koji Shidara, Masahiko Shimazu, Chishū Ryū	Comedy	
Hiroshima mon amour	Alain Resnais	Emmanuelle Riva, Eiji Okada, Bernard Fresson	Drama	Co-production with France
The Human Condition	Masaki Kobayashi	Tatsuya Nakadai, Michiyo Aratama, So Yamamura	—	
Kiku to Isamu	Tadashi Imai	Tanie Kitabayashi		Won Best Film at the 14th Mainichi Film Awards and at the 10th Blue Ribbon Awards
Magic Boy	Akira Daikubara, Taiji Yabushita		Fantasy adventure	Animated film
Monkey Sun	Kajiro Yamamoto	Norihei Miki, Fukutaro Ichikawa	Fantasy	
My Second Brother	Shohei Imamura	Hiroyuki Nagato		
Odd Obsession	Kon Ichikawa	Machiko Kyō, Ganjirō Nakamura, Junko Kano	—	
Samurai Vendetta	Kazuo Mori	Raizo Ichikawa, Shintaro Katsu		
Seki no yatappe	Satoshi Kado	Kazuo Hasegawa, Shintaro Katsu	Chambara	
Unforgettable Trail	Koji Shima	Fujiko Yamamoto	Drama	

== See also ==
- 1959 in Japan
