= 20,000 Leagues Across the Land =

1961 film directed by Marcello Pagliero

- Directed by: Marcello Pagliero
- Written by: Leonid Zorin, Sergey Mikhalkov, Semyon Klebanov, Michel Cournot
- Starring: Léon Zitrone; Yuri Belov; Nikolay Savin; Tatiana Samoilova; Jean Rochefort; Jean Gaven; Valentin Zubkov; Evgeny Burenkov
- Music by: Nikita Bogoslovsky
- Release dates: January 13, 1961 (USSR); January 18, 1961 (France)
- Running time: 98 minute
- Countries: USSR; France
- Language: Russian

20,000 Leagues Across the Land (French: Vingt mille lieues sur la terre or "Léon Garros Is Looking for His Friend", Russian: Леон Гаррос ищет друга, romanized: Leon Garros ishchet druga) is a 1961 Soviet-French feature film by Marcello Pagliero.

== Plot ==
During the Second World War Frenchman Leon Garros and Boris Vaganov escape from a Nazi concentration camp. After 15 years, Leon who has become a journalist, comes to the Soviet Union with his friends to make a report and accidentally finds Boris. Boris is not in Moscow, and for the sake of meeting a friend Leon has to take a car halfway across the country. Traveling with the foreigners is translator Nikolai, who in turn is looking for Natasha, his brother's runaway bride.

== Actors ==
- Léon Zitrone as Léon Garros, journalist
- Yuri Belov as Nikolay Savin, translator
- Tatiana Samoilova as Natasha, singer
- Jean Rochefort as Fernand
- Jean Gaven as Gregoire
- Valentin Zubkov as Alexey Savin, polar aviator and Natasha's groom
- Evgeny Burenkov as Boris Vaganov
- Lyudmila Marchenko as elevator woman in the hotel "Ukraine"
- Antonina Maksimova as chairman of the kolkhoz
- Vladimir Ivashov as Fyodor, a young worker in Bratsk
- Valentina Kutsenko as Olga
- Nina Nikitina as mother of Fyodor
- Margarita Zharova as maid
- Alexei Vanin as theatrically
- Tamara Yarenko as Claudia, hotel receptionist
- Zinovy Gerdt as voiceover
