= The Tale of Tsar Saltan (disambiguation) =

"The Tale of Tsar Saltan" is a poem by Aleksandr Pushkin. It may also refer to:

- The Tale of Tsar Saltan (opera), opera by Nikolai Rimsky-Korsakov
- The Tale of Tsar Saltan (1966 film), a Soviet film
- The Tale of Tsar Saltan (1984 film), an animated Soviet film
- The Tale of Tsar Saltan (2026 film), a live action Russian film
