= Tests for Real Men =

- Russian: Тесты для настоящих мужчин
- Directed by: Andrey Razenkov
- Written by: Valentin Chernykh
- Produced by: Viktor Glukhov; Aleksandr Ioshpa; Sergey Melkumov; Mariya Murashova
- Starring: Elvira Bolgova; Aleksey Serebryakov; Anna Kamenkova; Nikolay Eryomenko; Vitaly Solomin
- Cinematography: Masha Solovyova
- Edited by: Olga Grinshpun
- Music by: Adrian Korchinsky
- Release date: 1999
- Country: Russia
- Language: Russian

Tests for Real Men (Russian: Тесты для настоящих мужчин, romanized: Testy dlya nastoyashchikh muzhchin) is a 1999 Russian drama film directed by Andrey Razenkov.

== Plot ==
The film takes place in one major city of Russia. The plot focuses on mother Anna and her daughter Elvira. In the past, Anna's husband could not protect her from hooligans and now she wants a real man next to her daughter. Therefore, the daughter's friend Alex passes various tests with getting into extreme situations...

== Cast ==
- Elvira Bolgova
- Aleksey Serebryakov
- Anna Kamenkova
- Nikolay Eryomenko
- Vitaly Solomin
- Igor Vetrov
- Nikita Vysotskiy
- Zoya Zelinskaya
