= Cruelty (1959 film) =

- Directed by: Vladimir Skuybin
- Written by: Pavel Nilin
- Produced by: Valentin Maslov
- Starring: Georgi Yumatov; Boris Andreyev; Nikolai Kryuchkov
- Cinematography: Timofey Lebeshev
- Edited by: Lidia Lysenkova
- Music by: Mikhail Meyerovich
- Production company: Mosfilm
- Release date: 7 July 1959
- Running time: 92 min.
- Country: Soviet Union
- Language: Russian

Cruelty (Russian: Жестокость, romanized: Zhestokost) is a 1959 Soviet dramatic film directed by Vladimir Skuybin and based on Pavel Nilin's 1956 novel of the same name. (Note: A Russian film with the same name, Cruelty (Zhestokost), directed by Marina Lyubakova was released in 2007. In addition, there are also similarly-titled films Cruelty (Grimmd) (2016, Iceland), and Cruelty (2017, United States).)

== Synopsis ==
Set in the vicinity of a small Siberian town, the film centers around a brutal gang led by the character Kostya Vorontsov. The local police, assisted by members of the Komsomol, investigate the operations of the gang and attempt to liquidate them.

In one of the clashes with the bandits, the deputy head of the investigation, Veniamin Malyshev (a Komsomol member of the Civil War) is seriously wounded. In addition, Vorontsov's assistant Lazar Baukin (a former hunter and a soldier), is captured. Having ascertained during the interrogation that the gangster did not intend to help the policemen, the head of the criminal investigation department proposes to shoot the enemy. This is in accordance with the laws of revolutionary times. Suddenly, the wounded Malyshev intervenes, deciding that Baukin is a lost man who can be re-educated.

A complex drama of character unfolds and ends with the suicide of Malyshev, who believes that it is impossible to live with a lie. The young policeman could not stand the contrast between revolutionary ideals and the activities of careerists and demagogues.

== Cast ==
- Georgi Yumatov as Malyshev
- Apollon Yachnitsky as Kostya Vorontsov
- Boris Andreyev as Lazar Baukin
- Nikolai Kryuchkov as Yefrem Yefremovich, head of criminal investigation
- Vladimir Andreyev as Yakov Uzelkov
- Anatoly Kubatsky as charioteer
- Nikolay Smorchkov as Tsaritsyn
- Margarita Zhigunova as Julia Maltseva

== Release ==
In 1959, the film was watched by 29 million Soviet viewers, placing it 415th in the history of rentals.
