= A Day of Happiness =

1963 film

- Russian: День счастья
- Directed by: Iosif Kheifits
- Written by: Iosif Kheifits, Yuri German
- Starring: Aleksey Batalov; Tamara Syomina; Valentin Zubkov
- Cinematography: Genrikh Maranjyan
- Music by: Nadezhda Simonyan
- Production company: Lenfilm
- Release date: 27 July 1964
- Running time: 102 minutes
- Country: Soviet Union
- Language: Russian

A Day of Happiness (Russian: День счастья, romanized: Den schastya) is a 1963 Soviet romantic drama film directed by Iosif Kheifits and based on a novella by Yuri German. The film premiered in the USSR on July 27, 1964.

== Plot ==
The film follows Aleksandr Nikolaevich Berezkin, a dedicated ambulance doctor who meets a beautiful woman named Alexandra Nikolaevna Orlova—who, as it turns out, shares his full name—on a city bus. Eager to get to know her, Aleksandr awkwardly jokes, bends the truth, and pretends to be a provincial visitor so that she agrees to show him the sights of Leningrad. As they wander the city together, the ice in her voice gradually melts. However, Alexandra is married, and her life is not as simple as it first appears. She is loved and loves in return, lives in material comfort, and appears fulfilled as a housewife. But her husband, Fyodor Orlov, a geophysicist, is possessive and unwilling to share her—not even with her own sense of dignity or her calling. He forbids her from working as a schoolteacher, forcing her to remain idle at home, waiting for his return from expeditions. Accidentally separated from Aleksandr in a crowded store, she disappears into the crowd. Deeply affected by their brief encounter, Aleksandr searches for her during his ambulance shifts across the city.

On the same day Alexandra met Aleksandr, her husband Fyodor made an unanticipated return from an expedition. Though originally intended to stay only a few hours, Fyodor deliberately decides to create a "day of happiness" for himself and his wife. He prolongs his visit to spend more time with Alexandra, ultimately failing to return in time to rejoin his colleagues and inadvertently escaping the tragedy that claims their lives. Although not formally blamed, Fyodor is quietly pushed out of his profession. Unable to cope with guilt and loss of purpose, he takes up work as a television repairman, while telling Alexandra that he is involved in secret space-related projects. One day, Alexandra unexpectedly sees him at a repair shop, wearing a work smock and receiving payment under the table. The discovery devastates her—not because of the nature of his work, but because he had lied to her about the source of their family's income.

Meanwhile, Aleksandr finally finds Alexandra again and brings her to his modest apartment, which he shares with a number of kind but chaotic relatives. He is raising the three children of his late sister, while his sociable and kind-hearted mother keeps the home open to neighbors who come and go throughout the day. Unlike the comfort and order of life with Fyodor, Aleksandr’s world is one of material scarcity, but it is also rich in honesty, warmth, and quiet idealism. Alexandra is drawn to this life, yet also overwhelmed. She realizes that life with Aleksandr would not be about ease or admiration, but about shared values and commitment to others—and that she is not yet ready to live that way.

Aleksandr eventually asks for Alexandra's hand in marriage, but she turns him down. In the end, she leaves both men and travels to her late father's native village, where she begins working as a schoolteacher. It is her way of starting over and building a life rooted in purpose and self-respect. She tells Aleksandr that she hopes to grow into someone capable of living with the same dedication he has—and perhaps, someday, they will meet again.

== Cast ==
- Aleksey Batalov as Aleksandr Beryozkin
- Tamara Syomina as Aleksandra Orlova
- Valentin Zubkov as Fyodor Orlov
- Nikolai Kryuchkov as Timofey
- Larisa Golubkina as Rita
- Vladimir Lippart as Nikolay Evgenievich, a teacher at a rural school, Aleksandra's father
- Mariya Samoylova as Berezkin's mother
- Iosif Konopatsky as Lev Leonidovich
- Pavel Sukhanov as Berezkin's former brother-in-law
- Lyudmila Glazova as Berezkin's former brother-in-law's new wife
- Anna Lisyanskaya as Lady with a girl
