= Anna Kamenkova =

Soviet and Russian actress

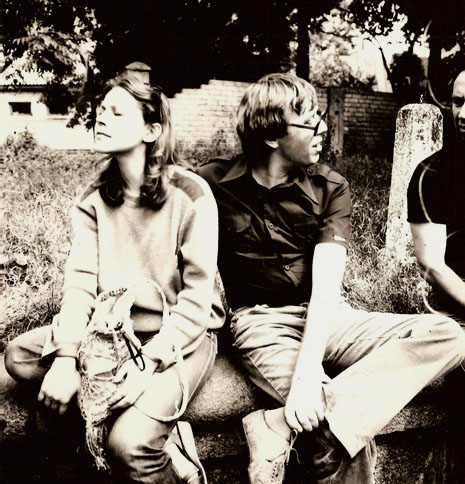
- Anna Kamenkova and Anatoly Spivak, 1982
- Born: Anna Semyonovna Kamenkova; 27 April 1953 (age 73); Moscow, RSFSR, USSR

Anna Semyonovna Kamenkova (Russian: Анна Семёновна Каменкова; born April 27, 1953, Moscow, RSFSR, USSR) is a Soviet and Russian actress of theater, cinema and dubbing. Honored Artist of the RSFSR (1985).

== Biography ==
Anna was the youngest of two children born to Olga Aleksandrovna Kamenkova-Pavlova and Semyon Abramovich Gurevich, who were teachers of the Russian language and literature.

Her first role came at age 5 in 1959 in the film Girl Seeks Father. For this role, she was awarded a prize for best performance of the children's role in the Mar del Plata International Film Festival in 1960.

Following this, she received further offers, but her parents decided that a film career would interrupt her studies. Despite this, she continued her training at the Palace of Pioneers' studio of artistic expression, under the tutelage of Galina Aleksandrovna Khatsrevin.

When Anna was 9, their mother died, and it was her elder sister Olga Kamenkova-Pavlova who supported her.

In 1974 she graduated from the Mikhail Shchepkin Higher Theatre School (workshop of Mikhail Tsaryov).

As a student, she made her debut at the Maly Theatre in the play The Makropulos Affair by Karel Chapek.

From 1974 to 1992 she worked in the Moscow Theater on Malaya Bronnaya, where she played more than a dozen roles.

Her return to film came in 1975 with Forest Swing. Her subsequent role in Leonid Menaker's melodrama Young Wife (1979) earned her the prize for Best Actress at the All-Union Film Festival in Ashgabat.

Anna Kamenkova is a leading voice actress, and has dubbed roles for Sharon Stone, Barbra Streisand, Kate Winslet, Meg Ryan, Meryl Streep, Juliette Binoche, Julie Roberts, Irene Jacob, Kathleen Turner, among others.

After eighteen years at the Theater on Malaya Bronnaya, she left in 1992 to work with independent theatrical companies, including the Benefis Theater.

In 1980 she married her colleague, the director Anatoly Spivak. In 1987 they had a son Sergei.

== Selected filmography ==
=== Actress ===
- Girl Seeks Father (Russian: Девочка ищет отца, 1959) as Lena
- Vasilisa the Beautiful (Василиса Прекрасная, 1977) as Vasilisa the Beautiful
- Investigation Held by ZnaToKi (Следствие ведут ЗнаТоКи, 1978) as Antonina
- Young Wife (Russian: Молодая жена, 1978) as Manya Streltsova
- Visit to Minotaur (Визит к Минотавру, 1987) as Elena Nechaeva
- You Exist... (Ты есть..., 1993)
- Tests for Real Men (Тесты для настоящих мужчин, 1998)
- The Circus Princess (Принцесса цирка, 2008) as Viktoria
- Le Concert (2009) as Irina Filipova
- The Perfect Ones (Без меня, 2018) as Ksenia's mother
- Van Goghs (Ван Гоги, 2019) as Masha's mother
- Kraken (Кракен, 2025) as Viktor and Alexander's mother

=== Dubbing ===
- A Cruel Romance (Жестокий романс, 1984) as Larisa Ogudalova
- Gardes-Marines, Ahead! (Гардемарины, вперёд!, 1988) as Anastasia Yaguzhinskaya
- The Cat Who Walked by Herself (Кошка, которая гуляла сама по себе, 1988) as women
- Viva Gardes-Marines! (Виват, гардемарины!, 1991) as Anastasia Yaguzhinskaya
- Humiliated and Insulted (Униженные и оскорблённые, 1991) as Natasha
- Prince Vladimir (Князь Владимир, 2006) as Princess Olga
