= Vladimir Andreyev (actor) =

Russian actor and theatre director (1930–2020)

- Владимир Андреев
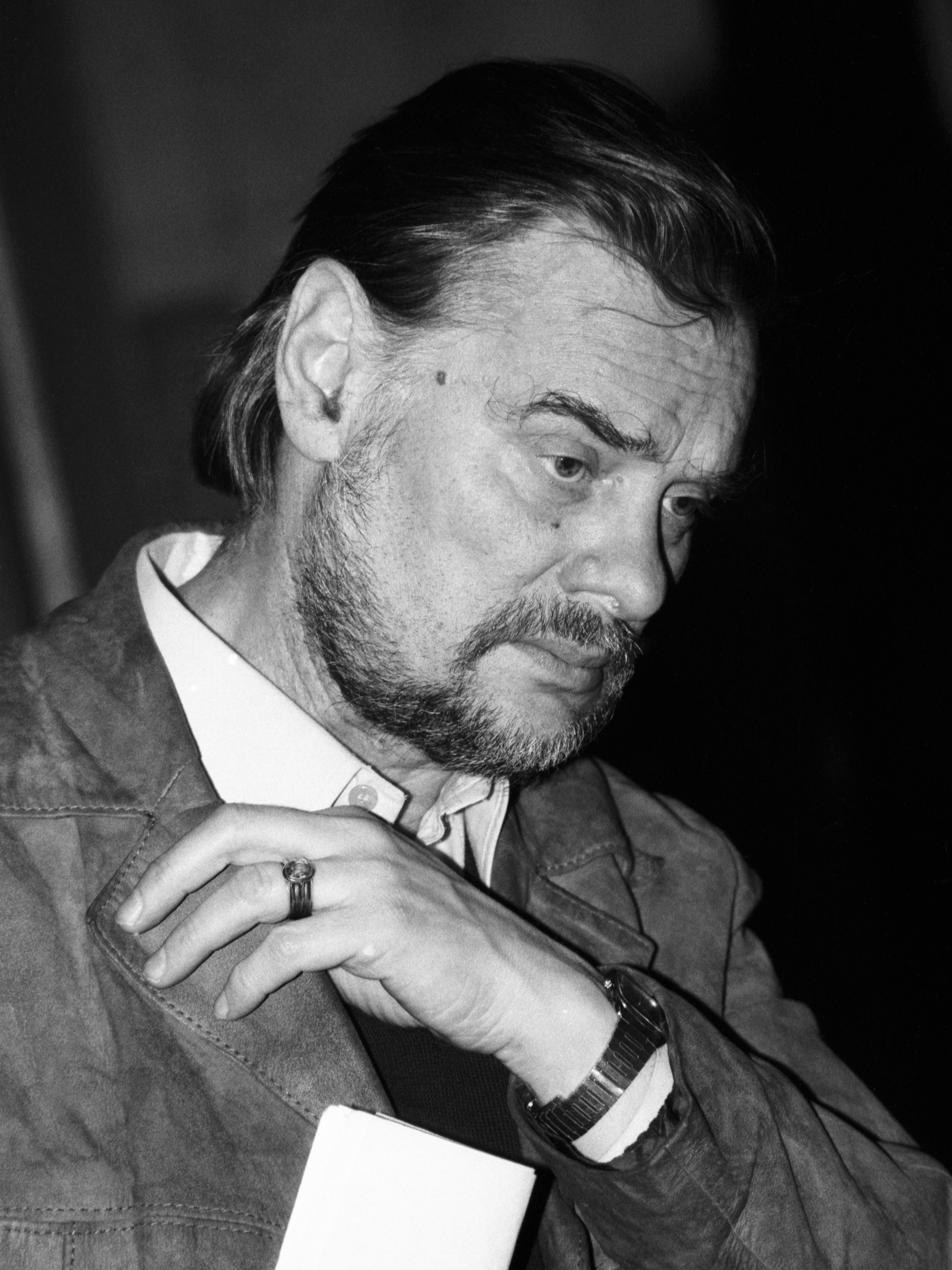
- Andreyev in 1993
- Born: August 27, 1930; Moscow, Russian SFSR, Soviet Union
- Died: August 29, 2020 (aged 90); Moscow, Russia
- Occupations: Actor, theater director, pedagogue
- Years active: 1952–2020
- Spouse(s): Natalya Seleznyova (1968–2020)
- Awards: People's Artist of the USSR (1985); Golden Mask (2018)

Vladimir Alekseyevich Andreyev (Note: Russian: Владимир Алексеевич Андреев, romanized: Vladimir Alekseyevich Andreyev) (27 August 1930 – 29 August 2020), also spelt Vladimir Alekseevich Andreev, was a Soviet and Russian actor and director of stage and screen, as well as pedagogue.

== Early life and education ==
Vladimir Alekseyevich Andreyev (also spelt Vladimir Alekseevich Andreev) was born in Moscow, USSR, on 27 August 1930.

In 1952 he graduated from the Lunacharsky State Institute for Theatre Arts.

== Career ==
In 1952 Andreyev was appointed director of the Ermolova Theatre, later becoming artistic director in 1990.

His debut acting role in the cinema was in the 1954 Soviet film True Friends.

From 1985 until 1988 he was the chief director of the Maly Theatre in Moscow.

He was also professor of the Russian Academy of Theatre Arts.

== Recognition ==
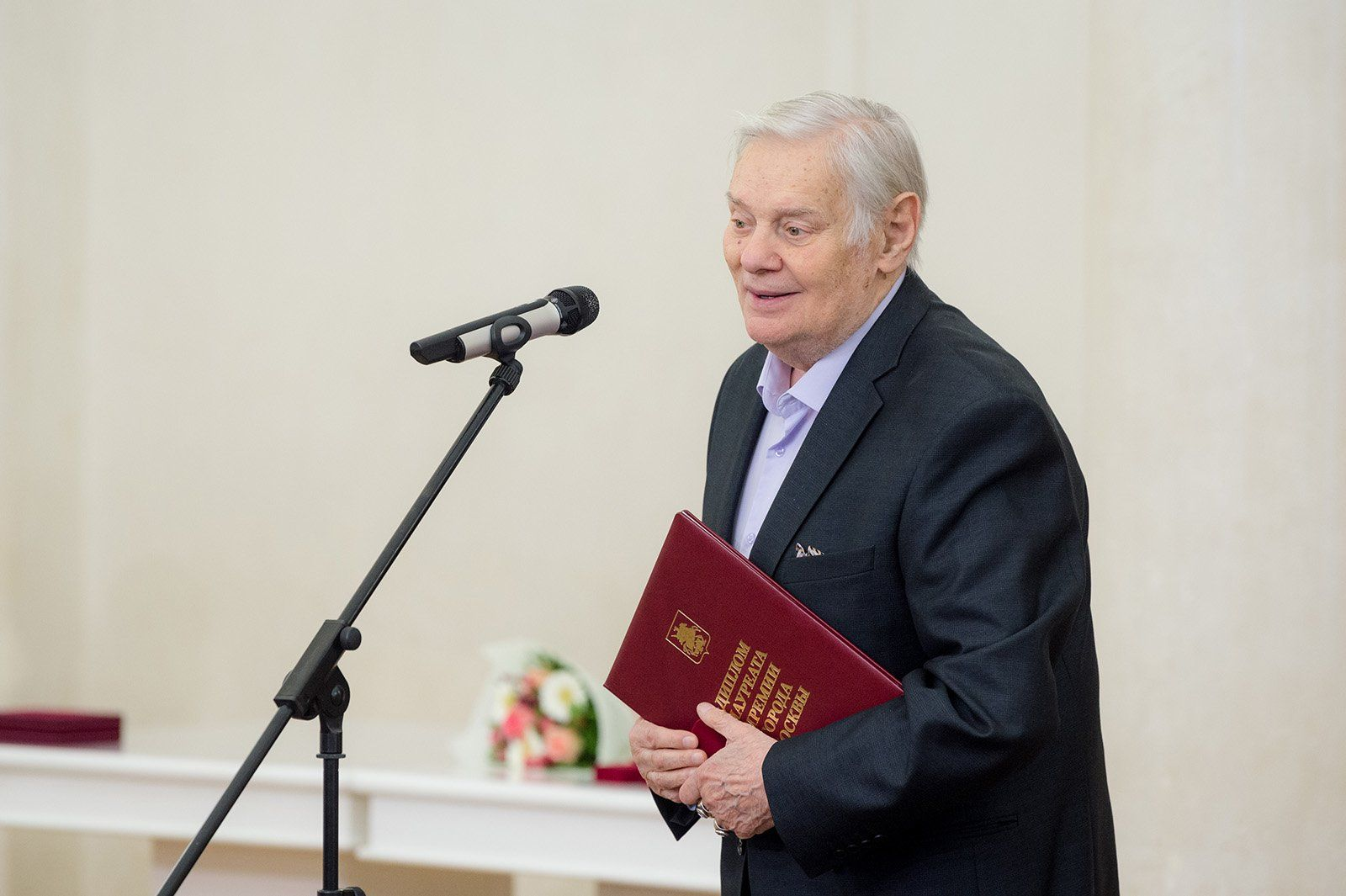
Receiving of 2019 Moscow Prize for Literature and the Arts

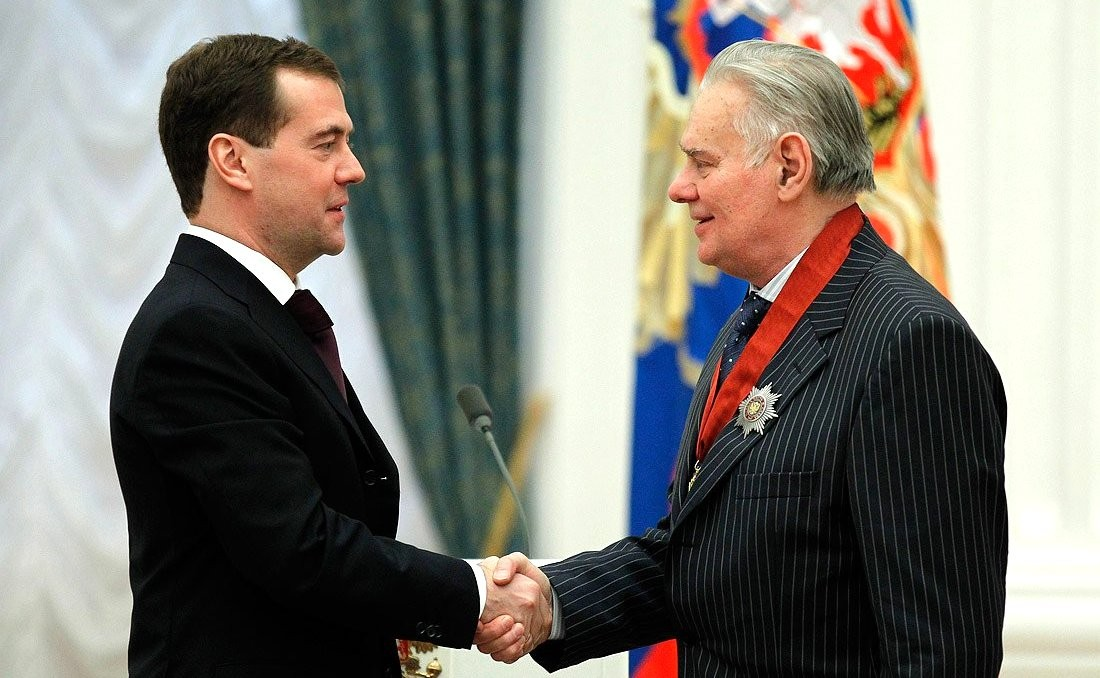
Andreev receiving of Order "For Merit to the Fatherland", 2nd class with Dmitry Medvedev, 21 February 2011

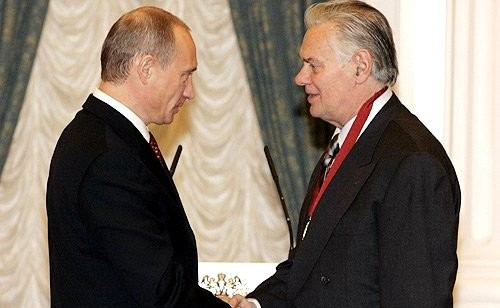
Andreev receiving of Order "For Merit to the Fatherland", 3rd class with Vladimir Putin, 28 October 2005

Andreyev was awarded several honours, including:

- State Prize of the RSFSR (1980)
- People's Artist of the USSR (1985)
- People's Artist of Tatarstan
- Academician of the Academy of Humanities (1995)
- Full member of the International Theater Academy (2000)
- Golden Mask award for Outstanding Contribution to the Development of Theatrical Art (2018)

== Personal life ==
Andreyev's wife was actress Natalya Seleznyova.

== Death ==
Andreyev died on 29 August 2020.

== Filmography ==
- True Friends (1954) as Komsomol member
- Certificate of Maturity (1954) as Yurka
- Good Morning (1955) as Mitya Lastochkin
- Cruelty (1959) as Yakov Uzelkov
- Until Next Spring (1960) as Vasily
- The Tale of Tsar Saltan (1966) as Tsar Saltan
- Bastards (2006) as Kot in old age
- The Circus Princess (2008) as Pavel Fedotov
- Lev Yashin. The Goalee of My Dreams (2019) as Mishurin's father
