= Good Morning (1955 film) =

1955 film by Andrey Frolov

- Russian: Доброе утро
- Directed by: Andrey Frolov
- Written by: Leonid Malyugin
- Produced by: Mikhail I. Levin
- Starring: Tatyana Konyukhova; Izolda Izvitskaya; Yuri Sarantsev; Vladimir Andreyev; Lev Durov; Yevgeny Matveyev
- Cinematography: Nikolay Vlasov
- Edited by: Zoya Verevkina
- Music by: Vasily Solovyov-Sedoi
- Release date: May 26, 1955 (Soviet Union)
- Running time: 91 min.
- Country: Soviet Union
- Language: Russian

Good Morning (Russian: Доброе утро) (Dobroe Utro) is a 1955 Soviet comedy-drama film directed by Andrey Frolov. Actress Svetlana Druzhinina debuted in this film.

== Plot ==
Quiet and shy Ekaterina Golovan is assigned to a highway construction project in the Kuban region as a truck driver. Warmly welcomed by her young colleagues, she quickly falls for Vasily Plotnikov, a charming and confident excavator operator beloved by all but too self-absorbed to notice her. Struggling in her initial role, Ekaterina is reassigned to work with a struggling excavator team led by the underperforming Lastochkin. Determined to prove herself, she works hard, becomes a construction leader, and earns widespread respect. When a delegation, including Vasily, visits to study her methods, their relationship takes a new turn, and they ultimately embark together on the construction of another major highway.

== Cast ==
- Tatyana Konyukhova as Katya Golovan
- Izolda Izvitskaya as Masha Komarova
- Yuri Sarantsev as Vasya Plotnikov
- Vladimir Andreyev as Lastochkin
- Lev Durov as Yasha
- Yevgeny Matveyev as Sergey Sudbinin
- Ivan Lyubeznov as Mikhail Bobylyov
- Afanasi Belov as Ushatov
- Nina Agapova as Irina Koralyova
- Vasily Kornukov as photograph
- Daniil Netrebin as driver
- Pyotr Oliferenko as accordionist
- Mikhail Pugovkin as seller
- Nikolay Smorchkov as Bobrov
- Svetlana Druzhinina as belle of the ball (uncredited)
- Svetlana Kharitonova as belle of the ball (uncredited)

== Release ==
Andrey Frolov's film takes 344 place in the list of the highest-grossing Soviet-made films. It was watched by 31 million Russian spectators.
