= Valentina Ponomaryova (singer) =

Russian singer (born 1939)

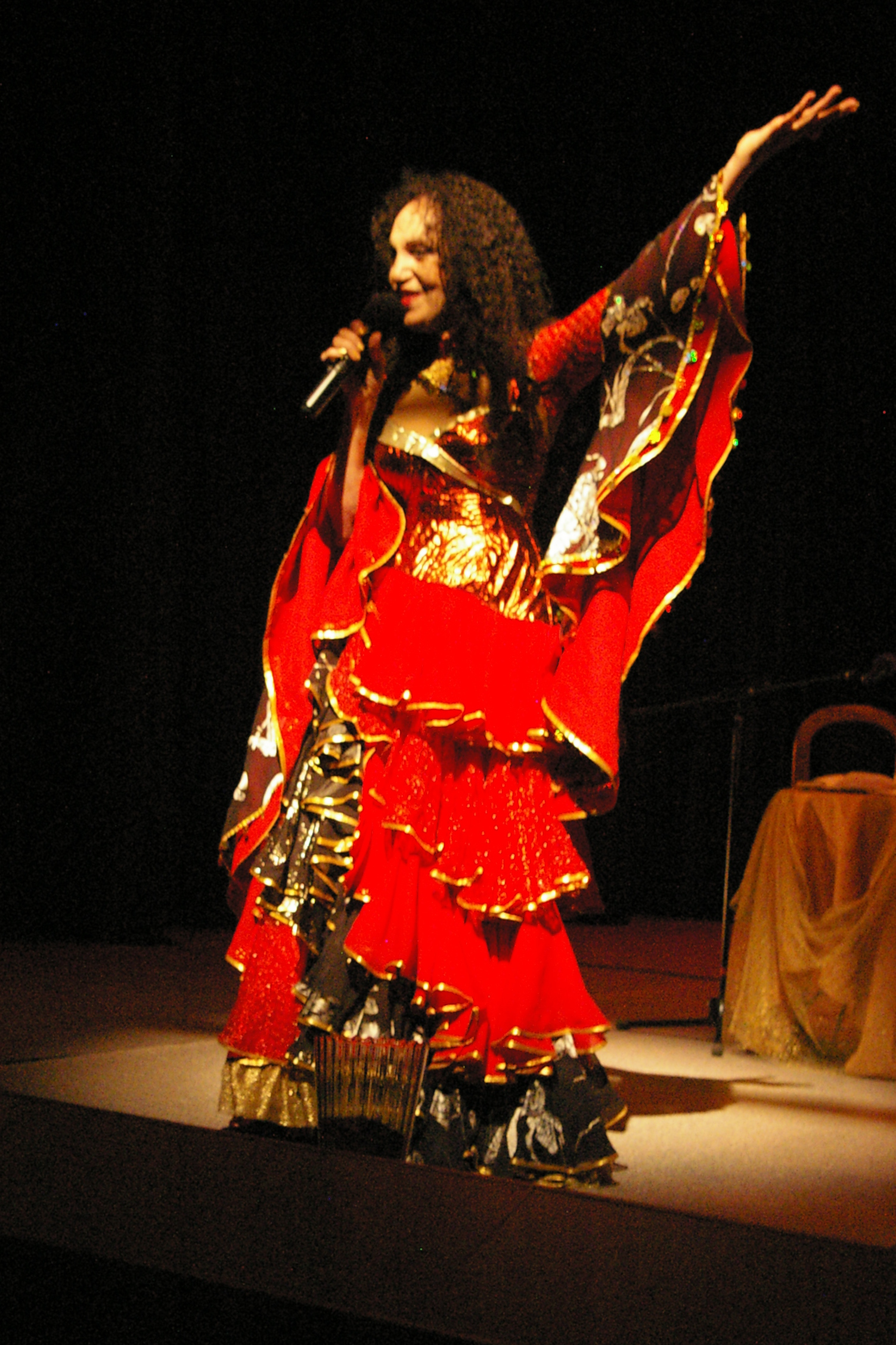
Ponomaryova in 2011

Valentina Dmitriyevna Ponomaryova (often also spelled Ponomareva; Russian: Валенти́на Дми́триевна Пономарёва; born 10 July 1939 in Moscow) is a Russian singer, performer of Russian romances and a jazz vocalist.

== Life and career ==
Valentina's father is Romani violinist Dmitry Ponomaryov, while her mother is Russian pianist Irina Lukashova. Valentina was born when her parents were students of the Moscow Conservatory and lived in a student dormitory. Valentina grew up surrounded by both classical European and Romani popular music.

Her parents traveled a lot so Valentina studied at many schools. After she finished her school she entered the Khabarovsk Arts College. She studied both vocal and piano. As a student she learnt about jazz and took a great interest in it.

Valentina took external degrees and was invited to a theater to act the part of a Gypsy singer in a dramatic play "The Living Corpse" (by Lev Tolstoy). Her role included several songs and was a great success with the audience.

In 1967 Valentina took part in the International Jazz Festival in Tallinn. There she was noticed and invited to join Anatoliy Krol's jazz-band, which was quite famous in the USSR.

In 1971 the singer left the band and became an actress in the Gypsy Romen Theatre in Moscow. In 1973, trio "Romen" performed on stage, with Valentina as a singer. In 1973 the trio was the laureate of the USSR Variety Performers Contest.

In 1983 Valentina left trio "Romen" and worked alone. She became involved in what came to be called "Soviet New Jazz", performing and recording with Jazz Group Arkhangelsk, as well as working with the composer Sofia Gubaidulina.

In 1983 she performed a set of romances for Eldar Ryazanov's historical film A Cruel Romance. These songs were radio hits for many years. Five years later she voiced the Woman in the animated feature film The Cat Who Walked by Herself.

In the early 1990s she recorded as part of a trio with Ken Hyder and Tim Hodgkinson.

Her complete recordings with the Trio Romen is being re-released (2008) by Jon Larsen's Hot Club Records .
