= The Cat Who Walked by Herself =

- Directed by: Ideya Garanina
- Written by: Ideya Garanina; Mariya Solovyova
- Produced by: Ideya Garanina
- Starring: Valentina Ponomaryova; Elena Sanayeva; Georgi Burkov; Nikolai Karachentsov; Inna Churikova; Nogon Shumarov; Anna Kamenkova; Nikolai Burlyayev
- Edited by: Nadezhda Treshchyova
- Music by: Sofya Gubaydulina
- Release date: 1988 (Soviet Union)
- Running time: 70 minutes
- Country: Soviet Union
- Language: Russian

The Cat Who Walked by Herself (Russian: Кошка, которая гуляла сама по себе, romanized: Koshka, kotoraya gulyala sama po sebe) is a 1988 Soviet animated feature film directed by Ideya Garanina and made at the Soyuzmultfilm studio. It is based on Rudyard Kipling's short story "The Cat that Walked by Himself". Like the earlier Soviet animated feature Adventures of Mowgli, the film retains the dark, primal tone of Kipling's work. The production includes almost all types of animation technologies.

It is not the only Soviet screen version of this fairy tale; in 1968 the director Aleksandra Snezhko-Blotskaya at the same studio released another animated film, "The Cat Who Walked by Himself", lasting only 20 minutes.

== Plot ==
The film is largely based on Kipling's short story, but expands it with several digressions.

=== Frame story ===
A couple - a man and a woman - put their young child in his crib for the night and leave the room. The child starts crying, and the Cat comes into the room to keep him company. When the child grabs her tail, the Cat angrily reminds him that they agreed "a thousand years ago" that he would not do that. Upon seeing that the child doesn't remember, the Cat sighs and decides to tell him the story from the beginning. The story starts when the planet was young and life on Earth was emerging with early creatures among erupting volcanoes.

== Creators ==
	English	Russian
Director-producer	Ideya Garanina	Идея Гаранина
Scenario	Ideya Garanina; Mariya Solovyova	Идея Гаранина; Мария Соловьёва
Art director	Nina Vinogradova	Нина Виноградова
Animators	Aleksandr Gorlenko; Violetta Kolesnikova; Aleksandr Panov; Yuriy Batanin; Vladimir Shevchenko; Anatoliy Abarenov; Olga Panokina; Akop Kirakosyan; Yelena Gavrilko; Tatyana Molodova; Lidiya Mayatnikova	Александр Горленко; Виолетта Колесникова; Александр Панов; Юрий Батанин; Владимир Шевченко; Анатолий Абаренов; Ольга Панокина; Акоп Киракосян; Елена Гаврилко; Татьяна Молодова; Лидия Маятникова
Camera operator	Aleksandr Vikhanskiy	Александр Виханский
Executive producer	Grigoriy Khmara	Григорий Хмара
Composer	Sofya Gubaydulina	Софья Губайдулина
Sound operators	Vladimir Vinogradov; Sergei Karpov	Владимир Виноградов; Сергей Карпов
Script editor	Raisa Frichinskaya	Раиса Фричинская
Puppets / Decorations	Marina Chesnokova; Natalia Grinberg; Vladimir Abbakumov; E. Belova; Mikhail Koltunov; Aleksandr Maksimov; O. Potanin; Pavel Gusev; Vladimir Alisov; Anna Vetyukova; Svetlana Znamenskaya; Nikolay Zaklyakov; Liliana Lyutinskaya; V. Platonov; Nina Moleva; Oleg Masainov; Natalia Barkovskaya	Марина Чеснокова; Наталия Гринберг; Владимир Аббакумов; Э. Белова; Михаил Колтунов; Александр Максимов; О. Потанин; Павел Гусев; Владимир Алисов; Анна Ветюкова; Светлана Знаменская; Николай Закляков; Лилиана Лютинская; В. Платонов; Нина Молева; Олег Масаинов; Наталия Барковская
Sculptor	S. Aseryants	С. Асерьянц
Voice actors	Valentina Ponomaryova; Elena Sanayeva (Cow); Georgi Burkov (Man, Dog); Nikolai Karachentsov (Horse); Inna Churikova (Cat); Nogon Shumarov; Anna Kamenkova (Woman); Ivan Burlyayev (Child)	Валентина Пономарёва; Елена Санаева; Георгий Бурков; Николай Караченцов; Инна Чурикова; Ногон Шумаров; Анна Каменкова; Иван Бурляев
Editor	Nadezhda Treshchyova	Надежда Трещёва

== Home video ==
The film is available on DVD in the collection Золотая коллекция мультфильмов 9 ("Golden Collection of Cartoons 9"), a PAL 2003 Russian release. It also includes the films Barankin, Be a Man!, Inchgirl, The Pot of Porridge, How the Cat Fought with Mice, and Wings, Legs and Tails (total running time: 142 minutes).

The film has also been released on DVD by the company Krupnyy Plan.

== See also ==
- History of Russian animation
- List of animated feature-length films
- List of stop-motion films
