= Until Next Spring =

- Russian: До будущей весны
- Directed by: Viktor Sokolov
- Written by: Sergey Voronin
- Starring: Lyudmila Marchenko; Innokentiy Smoktunovskiy; Galina Vasilyeva; Vladimir Andreyev; Mariya Prizvan-Sokolova
- Cinematography: Semyon Ivanov
- Music by: Nadezhda Simonyan
- Release date: 1960
- Country: Soviet Union
- Language: Russian

Until Next Spring (Russian: До будущей весны) is a 1960 Soviet romantic drama film directed by Viktor Sokolov.

The film tells about the student of the institute who is betrayed by her first love. This makes her suspicious of the people around her and, as a result, she decides to leave the institute and go with her daughter to the village, where she meets a high school teacher, Alexei Nikolayevich, an exceptionally kind and sympathetic person who helps her change her views on life for the better.

== Plot ==
Vera, a student at the Leningrad Pedagogical Institute, experiences her first love, which brings not happiness but heartbreak. Betrayed by the man she loved, she becomes disillusioned, losing her trust in people and confidence in herself. Leaving the city and abandoning her studies, she moves with her young daughter to a remote village where no one knows her.

In the village school, the young teacher faces initial mischief from her primary students—pranks involving hedgehogs and puppies disrupt her lessons. Yet, over time, Vera wins their affection, and teaching becomes her source of joy. Outside the classroom, however, she remains withdrawn. A budding friendship develops with Alexei Nikolaevich, a teacher from a neighboring school, but their conversations are marred by disagreements and an unspoken tension. Despite her guarded demeanor, Vera finds herself drawn to his kindness and sincerity.

When Vera's father visits and discovers he has a granddaughter, he plans to take Vera and her daughter back to the Urals. On the day of departure, he witnesses the villagers' deep affection for Vera, as both adults and children gather to see her off. At the dock, Alexei Nikolaevich arrives to bid her farewell, expressing his understanding of her decision to leave. In that moment, Vera chooses to stay. Her students, reflecting on her decision, now refer to her not as the dismissive "teacher" but respectfully as their Vera Nikolaevna.

== Cast ==
- Lyudmila Marchenko as Vera
- Innokentiy Smoktunovskiy as Aleksey
- Galina Vasilyeva as Natasha (as G. Wassilewa)
- Vladimir Andreyev as Vasiliy (as Wadim Andrejew)
- Mariya Prizvan-Sokolova as Nastya
- Valentin Arkhipenko as father of Vera (as V. Arkhipenko)
- Nikolai Novlyansky
- Klarina Frolova-Vorontsova
- A. Yatsenko
- Igor Bogdanov
