= Anna Lisyanskaya =

Ukrainian and Russian theater and film actress

Anna Lisyanskaya born Hanna Hryhorivna Lysyanska (1 November 1917 - 2 December 1999) was a Ukrainian and Russian theater and film actress of Jewish origin.

== Early life and education ==
Hanna Lysyanska was born on 1 November 1917 in Mykolaiv in a theatrical family. Her father, Hirsh Lysyansky, was the head of the Mykolaiv Jewish Theater. Mother Sofia Dyshlis and fraternal aunt Dora Lysyanska were actresses of this theater since 1913, and began their stage career in 1912 in Kherson in the troupe of Ivan Koryk. In the early 1920s, the Lysyansky family performed in the performances of the workers' club named after Yakov Sverdlov, and little Lysyanska began to appear on the stage of the Mykolaiv Young Spectator's Theatre already at the age of six.

From 1932 to 1936, she studied at the theater studio at the Kyiv Young Spectator's Theatre. In 1935, Lysyanska worked at the State Theater of Musical Comedy of the Ukrainian SSR (now the Kyiv Operetta Theater).

== Career ==
In 1936, Lysyanska returned to Mykolaiv, where she worked at the Theater of the Young Spectator until 1938. There Lysyanska played in productions based on the stories of Sholom Aleichem, and she later came to these roles in the last years of her life.

Lysyanska was noticed by Kyiv director Mykola Makarenko. In 1938, she was invited to the troupe of the Kyiv Molodyy Theater, where she played Juliet in William Shakespeare's famous tragedy, Yulenka in The Profitable Place by Alexander Ostrovsky, Yelena in A Month in the Country by Ivan Turgenev, and other roles. In this theater, the young actress was noticed by screenwriter Ihor Savchenko. Thanks to him, Lysyanska made her film debut in 1941, playing the main role of Nastya in Hrigory Hrycher-Cherikover's film Years of Youth ( Kyiv Film Studio, Ashgabat Film Studio).

Since 1949 she was an actress in the Leningrad Academic Drama Theater, named after Aleksandr Pushkin. In addition to theater and cinema, Hanna Lysyanska worked on radio and television. Here she starred in Isaak Dunaevsky's operetta Grooms, where she played Horpina Savvyshna. In this work, Lysyanska showed her skills as an operetta actress. Since 1967, Lysyanska began to perform on the stage of the Leningrad Musical Comedy Theater. At first, she combined work in two theaters, after which she decided on the last one.

In the last years of her work, Lysyanska again turned to the topic of Jewish characters. In the Experiment miniature theater, she prepared a one-act play Odesa Wedding by Mykhailo Zhvanetsky. In 1989, she played the role of an aunt in The Art of Living in Odessa, a year later - the role of Madame Weiner in the film directed by Oleksandr Zeldovich The Decline based on the work of Isaac Babel, and in 1991 - the role of the mother of a large Jewish family in Dmytro Astrakhan's film Get Thee Out.

In 1993, Lysyanska became seriously ill, and with the support of her close friend, actress Lilian Malkina, she moved to Israel to live with her relatives. The last years of her life were spent there.

Hanna Lysyanska died on 2 December 1999 in the city of Arad. On the monument on her grave, there are inscriptions in Russian and Hebrew: "To the Actress of the theater and cinema Hanna Lysyanskaya from fans."

== Selected filmography ==
- 1942 – Years of youth
- 1942 – How the steel was tempered
- 1943 – Rainbow
- 1953 – Alyosha Ptitsyn Grows Up
- 1954 – A Big Family
- 1955 – Twelfth Night
- 1955 – The Gadfly
- 1958 – Sailor from "Comet"
- 1963 – A Day of Happiness
- 1964 – Little Hare
- 1966 – Lenin in Poland
- 1970 – The magical power of art
- 1971 – Property of the Republic
- 1972 – My brother
- 1973 – Acting architect "Sova"
- 1974 – Remember Your Name
- 1975 – Love at first sight
- 1977 – Born of the revolution
- 1977 - The Nose
- 1978 – Three bad days
- 1979 – Three Men in a Boat
- 1980 – Doll-Ruslan and his friend Sanka
- 1982 – An oriole is crying somewhere
- 1984 – The art of living in Odesa
- 1989 – Tranti-Vanti
- 1990 – Zahid
- 1991 – Get Thee Out
- 1993 – Fast-flowing gardens
