= Sergei Agababov =

Russian composer

Sergei Artyomevich Agababov
- Серге́й Артемьевич Агабабов
- Born: October 25, 1926; Makhachkala, Dagestan, Soviet Union
- Died: October 23, 1959 (aged 32); Vnukovo International Airport, Moscow, Soviet Union
- Education: Dagestan Medical Institute; School of Music; Moscow Conservatory
- Occupation: Composer
- Known for: Soviet-era compositions, musical contributions to Dagestan
- Notable work: Daughter of Dagestan, Song of Oilers
- Honors: Two music schools and a street named after him in Makhachkala; commemorative plaque (2010)

Sergei Artyomevich Agababov (Russian: Серге́й Артемьевич Агабабов, 25 October 1926, in Makhachkala, Dagestan – 23 October 1959, in Vnukovo International Airport, Moscow, USSR) was a Soviet composer of Armenian origin.

== Biography ==
Agababov was born on 25 October 1926 in Makhachkala. In 1951, he graduated with honours from both Dagestan Medical Institute, and the School of Music, in which he wrote his first song, Daughter of Dagestan and Song of Oilers. Having made his choice in favour of music, he entered the Moscow Conservatoire in 1952 in the composition class of Anatoly Alexandrov.

== Death ==
On October 23, 1959, 2 days before his 33rd birthday, Agababov boarded Aeroflot Flight 200, an Ilyushin Il-14 flying from Baku to Moscow with stops in Makhachkala, Astrakhan and Stalingrad. Weather delayed the flight from the start. The flight arrived at Stalingrad with a delay of more than two hours. At 14:20 the aircraft approached Vnukovo, but the airport was closed due to meteorological conditions. Two hours after take-off, it arrived back in Stalingrad. At 18:50 the crew, being on duty for almost 14 hours, made a second takeoff. At 22:10 on the approach to the Vnukovo airport in low cloud cover when trying to land the plane, it touched trees 700 meters from the runway, fell to the forest, and was burned and destroyed. Only one person on board survived the crash, a passenger. All 5 crew members and the other 23 passengers, among whom was Sergei Artemyevitch Agababov, were killed.

== Honours ==
Two schools of music and a street in Makhachkala have been named after Agababov, and, in 2010, a commemorative plaque was unveiled on the house in Buinakskaya Street where he was born and grew up.
