= Pavel Nilin =

- Born: Pavel Filippovich Danilin; January 17, 1908; Irkutsk, Russian Empire
- Died: October 2, 1981 (aged 73); Moscow, Soviet Union
- Occupations: Writer, screenwriter, journalist
- Writing career
- Genres: Fiction, drama
- Notable work: Cruelty (1956)

Pavel Filippovich Nilin (Russian: Павел Филиппович Нилин; January 17, 1908 – October 2, 1981) was a Soviet and Russian writer, screenwriter, journalist and playwright, best known for his novel A Man Goes Uphill (1936), adapted to the big screen under the title A Great Life, for which he, as a scriptwriter, received the Stalin Prize in 1941. His 1956 novel Cruelty was highly popular.

== Biography ==
Nilin was born in Irkutsk, into the family of a political exile. After the 1917 Revolution he worked as a criminal investigation officer in the town of Tulun, Irkutsk oblast, then in 1927 embarked upon a journalistic career, moving from Siberia first to Povolzhye, then Ukraine and finally Moscow. He debuted as a published author in 1936 with a series of short stories published by the Novy Mir magazine. In 1939 a novel about the Donbas miners called A Man Goes Uphill (1936) was re-worked by Nilin into a script for the film which came out in 1940 under the title A Great Life (Bolshaya Zhyzn), enjoyed massive success and secured him the Stalin Prize in 1941.

After the Great Patriotic War, part two of A Great Life was shot, only to be shelved. In a revised version it came out in 1958. By this time Nilin was an established author, whose novel Cruelty (Zhestokost, 1956), telling the story of the Soviet militia's fight against criminal gangs in the 1920s, proved to be both popular and critically acclaimed. Another well-received novel, a psychological war drama Across the Graveyard (Cherez kladbische) came out in 1962. In 1971 Nilin became of the Union of Soviet Writers' high ranking officials. He died in Moscow and was interred in the Vagankovo Cemetery.

== Private life ==
Pavel Nilin's wife was Matilda Yufit (1909-1993). They had two sons, Alexander Nilin (born 1940), is a sports writer, and Mikhail Nilin (born 1945), a psychologist and a script-writer.

== Bibliography ==
- A Man Goes Uphill (Chelovek idyot v goru, 1936, novel)
- Golden Hands (Zolotyie ruki, 1939, novelet)
- About Love (O lyubvi, 1940, novelet)
- In the White World (Na belom svete, 1947, play)
- Going to Moscow (Poezdka v Moskvu, 1954, novelet)
- The Trial Period (Ispytatelny srok, 1955)
- Cruelty (Zhestokost, 1956)
- Across the Graveyard (Cherez kladbishche, 1962)
- Interesting Life (Interesnaya zhyzn, 1969—1980)
