= Girl Seeks Father =

1959 film

- Directed by: Lev Golub
- Written by: Konstantin Gubarevich; Yevgeni Ryss
- Starring: Anna Kamenkova; Vladimir Guskov; Nikolai Barmin; Vladimir Dorofeyev; Anna Yegorova; Evgeniy Grigorev
- Cinematography: Oleg Avdeyev; Izrail Pikman
- Music by: Yuri Belzatsky; Vladimir Olovnikov
- Production companies: Belarusfilm; CinemaScope
- Release date: 1959
- Running time: 92 minutes
- Country: Soviet Union
- Language: Russian

Girl Seeks Father (Russian: Девочка ищет отца, romanized: Devochka ishchet otsa) is a 1959 Soviet children's drama film that was produced by Yuri Bulychyov at the Belarusfilm, directed by Lev Golub, and starring Anna Kamenkova, Vladimir Guskov, Nikolai Barmin. Writers: Konstantin Gubarevich, Yevgeny Ryss. In 1959, it was the fifth film highest-grossing film in the Soviet Union at the box office. It was watched by over 35 million spectators, making it the third-most watched Belarusian film ever.

== Plot ==
The film was set in Russia during World War II and is about a 5-year-old girl searching for her partisan leader father while escaping from the Nazis, who try to catch her to make her their hostage, and a young boy trying to save her. For some time, when the girl is lost in the forest alone or when Nazis finally catch two children, hope is almost lost.

== Cast ==
Credited cast

- Anna Kamenkova as Lena
- Vladimir Guskov as Yanka, forester's grandson
- Nikolai Barmin as Panas
- Vladimir Dorofeyev as forester
- Anna Yegorova as Praskovya Ivanovna
- Yevgeni Grigorev as Konstantin Lvovich, Medical Assistant
- Nina Grebeshkova as Anya
- Konstantin Bartashevich as Gunter, German Commandant

Rest of cast

- Viktor Uralsky as partisan Volodya
- Yevgeni Polosin as The Headmen
- Ivan Shatillo as Commissar

== Awards ==
- Mar del Plata International Film Festival, 3° Edition 1960. Best Child Performance (Anna Kamenkova).
- The 25th Annual Bengal Film Journalists' Association, 1962 . Ten Best Foreign Films.
