= 1959 in fine arts of the Soviet Union =

The year 1959 was marked by many events that left an imprint on the history of Soviet and Russian Fine Arts.

== Events ==
- Solo Exhibition of works by Yaroslav Nikolaev was opened in the Leningrad Union of Artists.
- The traveling exhibition of works by Yuri Neprintsev shown in Leningrad, Moscow, Sverdlovsk, Gorky, Saratov.
- In Kaliningrad on the Kalinin square at the railway station is opened a bronze monument to Mikhail Kalinin, sculptor Boris Edunov.
- Solo Exhibition of works by Piotr Belousov was opened in the City painting gallery in the Vologda.
- The traveling exhibition of works by Leningrad artists opened in Murmansk. The participants included Irina Baldina, Vsevolod Bazhenov, Nikolai Galakhov, Alexei Eriomin, Mikhail Kaneev, Maya Kopitseva, Alexander Koroviakov, Gavriil Malish, Evsey Moiseenko, Boris Shamanov, Elena Skuin, Victor Teterin, Yuri Tulin and Vecheslav Zagonek.

== Deaths ==
- May 26 — Vasiliy Kuchumov (Russian: Кучумов Василий Никитич), Russian soviet painter and graphic artists (born 1888).
- November 3 — Fiodor Bogorodskiy (Russian: Богородский Фёдор Семёнович), Russian soviet painter and graphic artists, Honored art worker of Russian Federation, Stalin Prize winner (born 1895).
- December 29 — Alexei Kokorekin (Russian: Кокорекин Алексей Алексеевич), Russian soviet graphic artists, Honored art worker of Russian Federation, Stalin Prize winner (born 1906).

== See also ==
- List of Russian artists
- List of painters of Leningrad Union of Artists
- Saint Petersburg Union of Artists
- Russian culture
- 1959 in the Soviet Union

== Sources ==
- Творчество самодеятельных художников Ленинграда. Каталог. Л., Художник РСФСР, 1959.
- Ивенский С. Петр Петрович Белоусов. Л., Художник РСФСР, 1959.
- Передвижная выставка произведений ленинградских художников. Каталог. Л., Художник РСФСР, 1959.
- Artists of Peoples of the USSR. Biography Dictionary. Vol. 1. Moscow, Iskusstvo, 1970.
- Artists of Peoples of the USSR. Biography Dictionary. Vol. 2. Moscow, Iskusstvo, 1972.
- Directory of Members of Union of Artists of USSR. Volume 1,2. Moscow, Soviet Artist Edition, 1979.
- Directory of Members of the Leningrad branch of the Union of Artists of Russian Federation. Leningrad, Khudozhnik RSFSR, 1980.
- Artists of Peoples of the USSR. Biography Dictionary. Vol. 4 Book 1. Moscow, Iskusstvo, 1983.
- Directory of Members of the Leningrad branch of the Union of Artists of Russian Federation. - Leningrad: Khudozhnik RSFSR, 1987.
- Artists of peoples of the USSR. Biography Dictionary. Vol. 4 Book 2. - Saint Petersburg: Academic project humanitarian agency, 1995.
- Link of Times: 1932 - 1997. Artists - Members of Saint Petersburg Union of Artists of Russia. Exhibition catalogue. - Saint Petersburg: Manezh Central Exhibition Hall, 1997.
- Matthew C. Bown. Dictionary of 20th Century Russian and Soviet Painters 1900-1980s. London, Izomar, 1998.
- Vern G. Swanson. Soviet Impressionism. Woodbridge, England, Antique Collectors' Club, 2001.
- Время перемен. Искусство 1960—1985 в Советском Союзе. СПб., Государственный Русский музей, 2006.
- Sergei V. Ivanov. Unknown Socialist Realism. The Leningrad School. Saint-Petersburg, NP-Print Edition, 2007. ISBN 5-901724-21-6, ISBN 978-5-901724-21-7.
- Anniversary Directory graduates of Saint Petersburg State Academic Institute of Painting, Sculpture, and Architecture named after Ilya Repin, Russian Academy of Arts. 1915 - 2005. Saint Petersburg: Pervotsvet Publishing House, 2007.
