= Alexander Mironenko =

Soviet aviator (1959–1980)

Alexander Grigoryevich Mironenko
- Александр Григорьевич Мироненко
- Born: 20 October 1959; Dushanbe
- Died: 29 February 1980 (aged 20); Kunar Province, Afghanistan
- Military career
- Allegiance: Soviet Union
- Branch: Soviet airborne
- Service years: 1978–1980
- Rank: Senior sergeant
- Unit: 103rd Guards Airborne Division
- Conflicts: Soviet–Afghan War †
- Awards: Hero of the Soviet Union

Alexander Grigoryevich Mironenko (Russian: Александр Григорьевич Мироненко; 20 October 1959 – 29 February 1980) was a Soviet airborne senior sergeant and posthumous Hero of the Soviet Union.

Mironenko was posthumously awarded the title for reportedly killing at least 12 Mujahideen and then blowing himself up with a grenade when approached by Mujahideen after running out of ammunition. Mironenko served with the 103rd Guards Airborne Division.

== Early life ==
Mironenko was born on 20 October 1959 in Dushanbe to a working-class family. He graduated from eight grades at Secondary School No. 37 in the city. Mironenko graduated from a civil engineering school. He was on the Tajik SSR junior boxing team and was at the All-Union Youth Tournament. On 16 September 1978 he was drafted into the Soviet Army. He was sent to the 317th Guards Airborne Regiment of the 103rd Guards Airborne Division at Vitebsk. Mironenko graduated from the school of junior commanders and was secretary of his unit's Komsomol Bureau.

== Soviet-Afghan War ==
In December 1979 the division was deployed to Afghanistan. Mironenko was deputy commander of a platoon in the 317th Guards Airborne Regiment reconnaissance company. The platoon guarded important facilities in Kabul. On 29 February 1980, he participated in an operation to defeat a larger group of Mujahideen in the village of Shigal in Kunar Province. After landing from a helicopter, Mironenko and his platoon secured the landing zone. During this action, he reportedly killed 10 Mujahideen. During the fighting Mironenko and two others were cut off from the main forces. He reportedly organized the repulse of Mujahideen attacks but the other two paratroopers were killed. Reportedly wounded twice and bleeding to death, he continued to fire at the Mujahideen with a machine gun and grenades. When he ran out of ammunition Mironenko took his last F1 grenade and pulled the pin. When the Mujahideen approached after finding that Mironenko was out of ammunition, he blew himself up along with the Mujahideen.

On 28 April 1980, Mironenko was posthumously awarded the title Hero of the Soviet Union and the Order of Lenin. He was buried in the central city cemetery in Dushanbe. On 4 May 1991 he was reburied in Penza's Novozapadnaya Cemetery after his parents moved to Penza. On 26 November 2014, a new monument was unveiled at his grave.

The official version of Mironenko's death has been questioned by Sergey Boyarkin, another veteran of the 317th Guards. Boyarkin writes that Mironenko and Viktor Zadvornov, another soldier, were both shot by Efreitor Nikolay Sergeyev after both of them left the main force to loot a nearby village. Sergeyev reportedly had a grievance against Mironenko. After the shooting, Sergeyev reportedly fled into the mountains and was found the next day by a search group, reportedly testifying about the battle and how Mironenko and Zadvornov had been killed by the Mujahideen.

== Legacy ==
A monument to Mironenko was erected in Vitebsk. Secondary School No. 37 in Dushanbe was named after him. A trawler of the Murmansk trawler fleet was named after Mironenko.
