= The Tale of Tsar Saltan (1966 film) =

- Directed by: Aleksandr Ptushko
- Written by: Aleksandr Ptushko; Igor Gelein
- Starring: Vladimir Andreyev; Larisa Golubkina; Oleg Vidov
- Cinematography: Igor Gelein
- Music by: Gavriil Popov
- Production company: Mosfilm
- Release date: 1966
- Running time: 86 minutes
- Country: Soviet Union
- Language: Russian

The Tale of Tsar Saltan (Russian: Сказка о царе Салтане, romanized: Skazka o tsare Saltane) is a 1966 children's fantasy film based on the eponymous 1831 versified tale by Alexander Pushkin, directed by Aleksandr Ptushko.

== Plot ==
Three sisters are sitting by the window telling each other what they would do if the Tsar marries them. The first one would arrange a wedding banquet for all people, the second would dress everyone elegantly. The third and the youngest, however, says: "I would not give the Tsar money and goods, but instead a son with strength and courage."

The Tsar, who hears this conversation, takes the youngest woman as his wife. He places the other two as court cook and weaver. Envious of their youngest sister, the two join and come to the Tsar's court.

Some time later, the Tsar must go to war. His wife tells him in a letter that she has given birth to a son. The Tsar's reply is intercepted by the sisters and the mother-in-law and falsified to be so that the wife and son are sealed in a keg and thrown into the sea.

After a while they find themselves on a beach of a barren island. There the adult son rescues the life of a swan. This swan is a swan maiden, an enchanted princess. She creates a beautiful city for the mother and son, whose inhabitants make him Prince Gwidon. The swan also helps Gwidon disguise as an insect to see his father.

Some time later, the Tsar – against the wish of the sisters – comes to this city and recognizes his wife and son again.

== Cast ==
- Vladimir Andreyev - Tsar Saltan
- Larisa Golubkina - Queen
- Oleg Vidov - Prince Gvidon
- Ksenia Ryabinkina - Princess Swan (voiced by Nina Gulyaeva)
- Sergey Martinson - guardian of Saltan
- Olga Viklandt - mother-in-law (credited as "O. Viklandt")
- Vera Ivleva - weaver
- Nina Belyaeva - cook
- Victor Kolpakov - 1st deacon
- Yury Chekulaev - sleeping man
- Valery Nosik - servant
- Grigory Shpigel - governor
- Evgeny Mayhrovsky - jester
- Yakov Belenky - 1st ship-master
- Boris Bityukov - 2nd ship-master / 1st boyar
- Sergei Golovanov - 3rd ship-master
- Alexander Degtyar - 4th ship-master
- Artem Karapetyan - 5th ship-master
- Yury Kireev - 6th ship-master
- Grigory Mikhaylov - 7th ship-master
- Mikhail Orlov - 8th ship-master
- Dmitry Orlovsky - 9th ship-master
- Gurgen Tonunts - 10th ship-master
- Vladimir Ferapontov - 11th ship-master
