= The Circus Princess (TV series) =

- Based on: La muchacha del circo (1988)
- Screenplay by: Elena Bykovskaya, Boris Vinarsky, Igor Gardashlyk
- Directed by: Alla Plotkina; Kazbek Meretukov; Ildar Islamgulov; Sergey Danilean; Vladimir Kharchenko-Kulikovsky
- Starring: Valeria Lanskaya; Anna Kamenkova; Alina Sandratskaya; Tatyana Lyutaeva; Vladimir Andreyev
- Music by: Nikolay Krupatin
- Country of origin: Russia
- Original language: Russian

Production
- Producers: Yuri Kamenetsky; Ezhen Shchedrin; Margarita Pogonysheva
- Cinematography: Vladislav Zimnitsky; Alexey Soldatov; Mark Khomenko
- Running time: 43 min.
- Production companies: TeleROMAN; Channel One Russia

Original release
- Release: 28 January – 11 July 2008

The Circus Princess (Russian: Принцесса цирка, romanized: Printsessa tsirka) is a 2008 Russian telenovela. Adaptation of the Venezuelan soap opera La muchacha del circo (1988) based on Delia Fiallo's novel.

== Plot ==
1989, Samarsk. A local cardiac surgeon Pavel Fedotov's daughter from his first marriage, Marina, dies during childbirth. Pavel's current wife Victoria decided to get rid of Marina’s newborn daughter, who, in the event of Paul’s death, would become his full heir. Victoria asks her chauffeur Gennady to give the child to circus artist Raisa. Raisa takes the child and leaves with a circus.

Our days. A circus troupe comes to the provincial town on tour. Two twin brothers, Yaroslav and Svyatoslav, take care of the young beautiful gymnast Asya. Yaroslav falls in love with her at first sight, and the girl reciprocates. No wonder, the intelligent and romantic Yarik is the man of her dreams! But suddenly he is forced to go on business to England.

Eighteen years ago, Asya was born in this town. She is the granddaughter of their stepfather, the famous cardiologist Pavel Fedotov. Her mother Asi died in childbirth, and Fedotov believed that the same fate befell the child. In fact, through the efforts of his second wife, Viktoria, the newborn girl was given to circus artist Raisa, who raised her.

== Cast ==
- Valeria Lanskaya as Asya Sokolovskaya
- Prokhor Dubravin as Yaroslav and Svyatoslav Romanov
- Maksim Radugin as Ivan Ryabinov, Asya's fiancé
- Anna Kamenkova as Viktoria
- Katerina Shpitsa as Masha
- Alina Sandratskaya as Dina
- Tatyana Lyutaeva as Sofya
- Vladimir Andreyev as Pavel Fedotov
- Aleksei Zharkov as Alexey Romanov
- Elena Golyanova as Raisa
- Ivan Shabaltas as Malkovtsev, lawyer
