= Juan Fernando Cobo =

Colombian artist (1959–2024)

Juan Fernando Cobo Agudelo
- Born: Juan Fernando Cobo Agudelo; 27 August 1959; Cali, Valle del Cauca, Colombia
- Died: 15 July 2024 (aged 64); Madrid, Spain
- Known for: Painting, Drawing, Sculpture, Printmaking

Juan Fernando Cobo Agudelo (27 August 1959 – 15 July 2024) was a Colombian painter, illustrator, sculptor and cultural promoter, one of the most notable artists of his native region, Valle del Cauca.

== Artistic career ==
Cobo lived and worked in places ranging from his native Cali and nearby Bogotá to Quito, Chicago, New York City, Tucson and Madrid, which gave him a broad vision of art. His work was featured in group and individual exhibitions since 1977, in Colombia and around the world.

In his final years, he edited and directed an online Latin American cultural magazine, Primera Plana.

In 2005, he called upon a number of writers and poets from Latin America and Spain to produce a literary anthology about the topic of violence and how it affects women, a particularly significant issue in recent Latin American history. The result was a book entitled MUJER, Soledad y Violencia ("Woman, Solitude, and Violence"), which he subsequently illustrated.

Cobo died in Madrid in July 2024.

== Sources ==
- Cobo A., Juan Fernando, (Ed.). MUJER, Soledad y Violencia. 1st ed. Santiago de Cali: Gente con Talento Ltda., 2005. ISBN 958-33-7493-8.
- ArteLista.com, Online Gallery. Entry at http://cobo.artelista.com/ (In Spanish)
- World Artist Directory https://web.archive.org/web/20071008114508/http://accessarts.net/cgi-bin/webdata/webdata_artz.pl?pagenum=81&cgifunction=Search&all_search=painting+watercolor+oil+acrylic&allany=+or+
- Art History Archive http://www.arthistoryarchive.com/arthistory/glossary/Painters-by-Nationality.html
