= Valentin Zubkov =

Soviet actor

- Born: 12 May 1923; Ryazan Governorate, RSFSR, Soviet Union
- Died: 18 January 1979 (aged 55); Moscow, Soviet Union
- Occupation: Actor
- Years active: 1956-1974

Valentin Ivanovich Zubkov (Russian: Валенти́н Ива́нович Зубко́в; 12 May 1923 – 18 January 1979) was a Soviet film actor. He was born in Peschanoye Settlement of Ryazan Province. He finished Armavir Military Aviation School (1941–1943) and served as a pilot at frontlines of the German-Soviet War.

== Career ==
In the late 1940s Valentin Zubkov studied in Konstantin Voynov’s studio and later played the leads in his films Three Came Out of the Woods and The Sun Shines for All (1959), as well as episodic roles in Time of Summer Vacations (Vremya letnikh otpuskov) (1960) and Dream of an Uncle (1966). He made his film debut in Lev Kulidzhanov and Yakov Segel’s It Began This Way (1956). In 1960 he joined the Theater Studio of Film Actor.

In 1957 Valentin Zubkov played a front soldier in The Cranes Are Flying (1957) and a cowardly villain in The Communist (1958). His most famous roles include those in the films Our Father's House (1959), Leon Garros Is Looking for His Friend (1961), Northern Story (1960), Ivan's Childhood (1962), and A Day of Happiness (1963). In the Hospital Train Zubkov played together with his son Sergey.

== Selected filmography ==
- The Cranes are Flying (Летят журавли, 1957)
- A Home for Tanya (Отчий дом, 1959)
- Over Tissa (Над Тиссой,1958)
- 20,000 Leagues Across the Land (Vingt mille lieues sur la terre, 1960)
- Yevdokiya (Евдокия, 1961)
- Man Follows the Sun (Человек идёт за солнцем, 1961)
- Ivan's Childhood (Иваново детство, 1962)
- Seven Nannies (Семь нянек, 1962)
- A Day of Happiness (День счастья, 1963)
- At War as at War (На войне как на войне, 1969)
