= Charles Jones (photographer) =

English gardener and photographer

Charles Harry Jones (1866 – 15 November 1959) was an English gardener and photographer, noted for his still lifes of fruit and vegetables.

== Biography ==
Born in Wolverhampton in 1866, although his father was a master butcher, Charles Harry Jones became a gardener. He worked on a number of private estates in England from the 1890s, including Great Ote Hall, near Burgess Hill, Sussex. His gardening was noted for the quality of his flowerbeds and cultivation of fruits and vegetables. He was also ingenious in providing a long season for fruit and vegetables. As a photographer, Jones was noted for his documentation of the fruits of his gardening labours. Jones also offered his services as a photographer to other gardeners.

He married in 1894. By 1910 he and his family moved to Lincolnshire, where he died on 15 November 1959, aged ninety-two.

== Photographic work ==
1902 image of carrots

The photographs were probably made between 1895 and 1910, and likely while he was employed at Ote Hall. Jones' work was never exhibited in his lifetime, and was largely unknown even to his family, until the photographic prints were discovered by accident in 1981. Sean Sexton found a suitcase containing hundreds of prints of vegetables, fruits and flowers at Bermondsey antiques market. Other than a very few exceptions, Jones' photographs exist only in unique examples. None of the glass-plate negatives have been located.

Jones isolated his vegetables, fruits and flowers against neutral dark or light backgrounds, in the manner of formal studio portraits. He used long exposures and small apertures to give depth of field.

== Legacy ==
Since Sexton's discovery, the collection of Jones' photographs has slowly been dispersed by him through auction and by other means. It has been collected by institutions and private collectors and exhibited at The Fine Arts Museums of San Francisco, the Musée de Elysée, Lausanne and at other venues and also been the subject of a book. In 2021 several of Jones' photographs were included in an exhibition at the Dulwich Picture Gallery about the history of photography through images of plants and botany, since they illustrate the use of gelatin silver printing.
