= Lyudmila Marchenko =

Soviet actress (1940–1997)

- Born: 20 June 1940; Arkhipo-Osipovka, Soviet Union
- Died: 23 January 1997 (aged 56); Moscow, Russia
- Occupation: Actress
- Years active: 1959–1982

Lyudmila Vasilyevna Marchenko (Russian: Людми́ла Васи́льевна Ма́рченко; 20 June 1940 – 23 January 1997) was a Soviet film actress. She appeared in twelve films between 1959 and 1976. She starred in the film A Home for Tanya, which competed for the Palme d'Or at the 1959 Cannes Film Festival.

== Selected filmography ==
- Volunteers (1958)
- White Nights (1959)
- A Home for Tanya (1959)
- Until Next Spring (1960)
- My Little Brother (1962)
- Cook (1965)
- Aybolit-66 (1966)
- Scouts (1968)
- İnsan məskən salır (1968)
- Widows (1976)
- Office Romance (1977)
- Say a Word for the Poor Hussar (1980)
