= Magic Boy (film) =

- American promotional poster
- Directed by: Akira Daikubara; Taiji Yabushita
- Screenplay by: Michihei Muramatsu; Toppei Matsumura
- Story by: Kazuo Dan
- Produced by: Hiroshi Ōkawa
- Music by: Satoshi Funemura; Toru Funamura
- Production company: Toei Animation
- Distributed by: Toei Company
- Release date: December 25, 1959 (Japan)
- Running time: 83 minutes
- Country: Japan
- Language: Japanese

Magic Boy, known in Japan as Shōnen Sarutobi Sasuke (少年猿飛佐助; "The Boy Sarutobi Sasuke"), is a 1959 Japanese animated feature film released on December 25, 1959. Released as Toei Animation's second theatrical anime feature and the first anime film produced in widescreen, the film was released in theaters in the United States by Metro-Goldwyn-Mayer on June 22, 1961, making it the first anime film to be released in the country, followed by The Tale of the White Serpent on July 8, 1961.

== Story ==
In medieval Japan, a boy named Sasuke and his sister live in a forest along with several young animals of different species. One day, one of the animals (a young deer) is grabbed by an eagle and thrown into a lake. Sasuke and another animal jump into the lake to save it, but a monstrous salamander arrives and devours one of the animals. Sasuke tries to fight the monster, but is defeated. The beast leaves the lake, revealing its true form: a female demon named Yakusha. Sasuke's sister tells him Yakusha was transformed into a salamander by a powerful wizard millennia ago, but now she can muster enough power to have her normal shape back and found a reign of terror in Japan. Sasuke then decides to seek a magician master to learn to fight against Yakusha to save Japan and avenge the death of his pet.

== Cast and characters ==
Character	Original	English
Sarutobi Sasuke	Teruo Miyazaki	Billie Lou Watt
O-Yū	Hiroko Sakuramachi	Unknown
Tozawa Hakuunsai	Kenji Susukida	Unknown
O-Kei-chan	Tomoko Matsushima	Unknown
Sanada Yukimura	Katsuo Nakamura	Unknown
Miyoshi Seikai	Akira Kishii	Unknown
Yasha-hime O-Mon	Harue Akagi	Unknown
Yamaarashi no Gonkurō	Yoshio Yoshida	Unknown
Okera no Kinta	Ryōei Itō	Unknown
Batta no Sanji	Shunji Sakai	Unknown
Guard	Kazuo Kishida	Unknown

== The MGM version ==
In the English language version, Metro-Goldwyn-Mayer left most of the original songs with Japanese language lyrics. Since the creators of the English version preferred to liken Sasuke to the public perception of samurai, who were viewed as heroic, as opposed to the ninja, who were viewed as "sinister spies and assassins," MGM's publicity incorrectly claimed that The Adventures of the Little Samurai was the Japanese title of the film. This despite the movie poster's accurate display of the actual title.

== Video game ==
A video game titled Shōnen Sarutobi Sasuke (also known as Sasuke Ninja Boy) was released by Sunsoft for the Super Famicom in 1994.

== Reception ==
According to animation historian Jerry Beck, the film exhibited Toei Animation's effort to use the "Disney formula of presenting a traditional folktale with songs and plenty of cute animals."

== Home media ==
In 2014, Warner Home Video released the MGM dub of the film on DVD for the first time as a Warner Archive title.

== See also ==
- Manga Sarutobi Sasuke
