= A Home for Tanya =

1959 film by Lev Kulidzhanov

A Home for Tanya (Отчий дом)
- Film poster
- Directed by: Lev Kulidzhanov
- Written by: Budimir Metalnikov
- Starring: Vera Kuznetsova; Lyudmila Marchenko; Valentin Zubkov; Nikolai Novlyansky
- Cinematography: Pyotr Katayev
- Edited by: Lidiya Zhuchkova
- Production company: Gorky Film Studio
- Release date: 25 April 1959
- Running time: 100 minutes
- Country: Soviet Union
- Language: Russian

A Home for Tanya (Russian: Отчий дом, translit. Otchiy dom) is a 1959 Soviet drama film directed by Lev Kulidzhanov. It competed for the Palme d'Or at the 1959 Cannes Film Festival.

== Plot ==
In 1950s Moscow, Tanya, a young woman from a wealthy family studying at a pedagogical institute, learns that she is the biological daughter of Natalia Avdeyevna, an elderly rural woman who lost her during World War II. Curious and apprehensive, Tanya visits Natalia in her village, discovering a world vastly different from her own. Initially feeling out of place, Tanya gradually begins to understand and connect with the people and the rural way of life. Natalia introduces Tanya to Nyura, a local farm worker, and Sergey Ivanovich, a former soldier and the village chairman. Tanya witnesses village life firsthand, including the challenges faced by its residents. When Nyura is accused of theft, Sergey Ivanovich intervenes to ensure justice, reinforcing Tanya’s admiration for his fairness and leadership.

As Tanya prepares to return to Moscow, she unexpectedly finds herself helping Nyura, who plans to leave the village. Tanya convinces her friend to stay, highlighting the strong bond they have developed. Meanwhile, Tanya’s growing affection for Sergey Ivanovich leads to an emotional conversation where he gently explains that their connection is not meant to be. Tanya hides her disappointment, but her feelings are noticed by Natalia and her grandfather. In a parallel story, Sergey Ivanovich rekindles his love for Stepanida, a woman marked by personal losses and societal changes after the war. Their union brings closure to both characters, while Tanya gracefully accepts Stepanida’s happiness, despite her own heartache.

By the film’s end, Tanya decides to stay in the village and embrace her roots, forming a deeper bond with Natalia. She writes to her adoptive mother, expressing her excitement to introduce her biological mother. Tanya envisions her future as a teacher, inspired by the village and its people. When a new teacher from Moscow arrives, Tanya takes on the role of guide, mirroring the hospitality she once received. The film closes with Tanya embracing her dual identity, recognizing the profound connection she has formed with her two mothers and her new life in the village.

== Cast ==
- Vera Kuznetsova as Natalya Avdeyevna
- Lyudmila Marchenko as Tanya
- Valentin Zubkov as Sergei Ivanovich
- Nikolai Novlyansky as Grandfather Avdey
- Nonna Mordyukova as Stepanida
- Lyusyena Ovchinnikova as Nyurka
- Pyotr Kiryutkin as Mokeich
- Pyotr Alejnikov as Fyodor
- Yelena Maksimova as Markarikha
- Yuri Arkhiptsev as Pyotr
