= Isaac Glikman =

Russian music educator and theatre critic

- Born: January 11, 1911; Vitebsk, Russian Empire
- Died: July 31, 2003 (aged 92); St. Petersburg, Russia
- Occupations: librettist, screenwriter, critic, professor

Isaac Davydovich Glikman (1911–2003) was a Soviet literary critic, theater critic, librettist, screenwriter, and teacher at the St. Petersburg Conservatory. He was a close friend of the composer Dmitri Shostakovich.

== Biography ==
Glikman was born in 1911 in Vitebsk, in the family of Jewish actor David Glikman.

He graduated from philology faculty of the Leningrad University. It was while working in an administrative capacity for the Leningrad Philharmonia's Mass Education Unit that he first met Shostakovich in 1931; he then became his literary consultant and unofficial secretary. In the 1940s he headed the literary section of the Maly Opera Theater. Collaborating with composers, librettists and directors, he helped to create new stage works, among them Sergei Prokofiev's War and Peace. He wrote screenplays for famous operas and operettas, and worked for many years as a music consultant and editor at Lenfilm.

== Filmography ==
- 1958: Mister X
- 1959: Morning Star
- 1959: Eugene Onegin
- 1960: The Queen of Spades
- 1969: Prince Igor

== Bibliography ==
- Meyerhold and Musical Theatre, 1989 - ISBN 5-85285-093-4
- Story of a Friendship: The letters of Dmitry Shostakovich to Isaak Glikman, 1941-1975 (Faber and Faber Ltd/Cornell University Press, Ithaca N.Y. 2001)
- Монологи на Большой Пушкарской, 44
