= Eugene Onegin =

Novel in verse by Alexander Pushkin

Eugene Onegin, A Novel in Verse
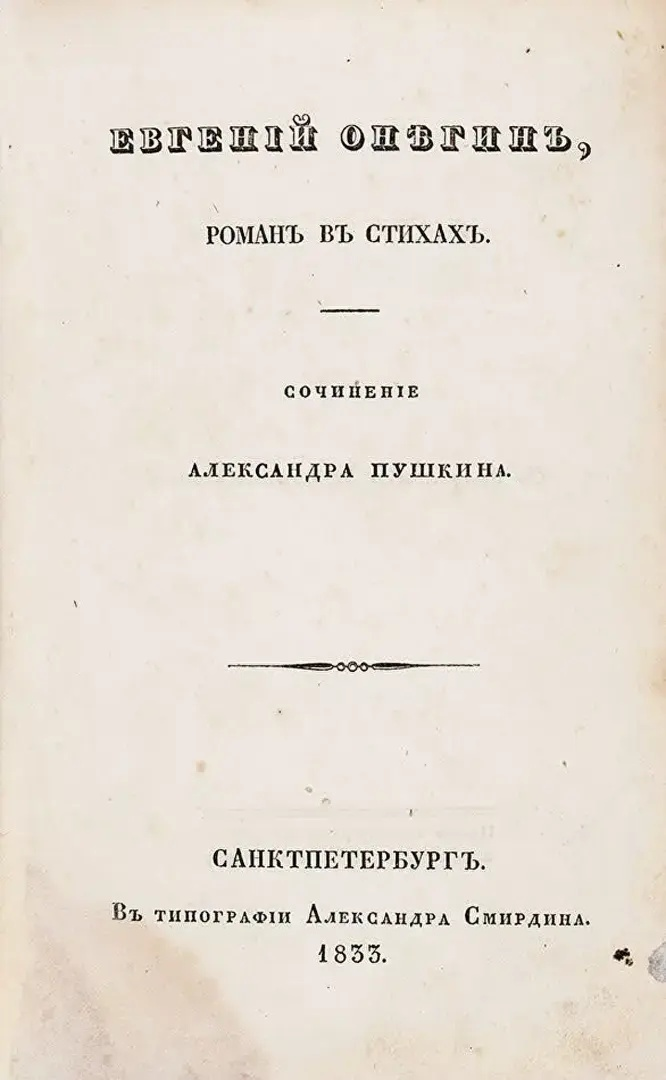
- First edition of the novel
- Author: Alexander Pushkin
- Original title: Евгеній Онѣгинъ, романъ въ стихахъ
- Translator: Vladimir Nabokov, Charles Johnston, James E. Falen, Lt.-Col. Henry Spalding, and Walter W. Arndt.
- Language: Russian
- Genre: Novel in verse
- Publication date: 1825–1832 (in serial), 1833 (single volume)
- Publication place: Russian Empire
- Media type: Print (hardback & paperback)

Eugene Onegin, A Novel in Verse (Russian: Евгений Онегин, роман в стихах, romanized: Yevgeniy Onegin, roman v stikhakh, pre-reform Russian: Евгеній Онѣгинъ, романъ въ стихахъ, [jɪvˈɡʲenʲɪj ɐˈnʲeɡʲɪn]) is a novel in verse written by Alexander Pushkin. Onegin is considered a classic of Russian literature, and its eponymous protagonist has served as the model for a number of Russian literary heroes (so-called superfluous men). It was published in a serial form between 1825 and 1832. The first complete edition was published in 1833, and the currently accepted version is based on the 1837 publication.

Almost the entire work is made up of 389 fourteen-line stanzas (5,446 lines in all) of iambic tetrameter with the unusual rhyme scheme AbAbCCddEffEgg, where the uppercase letters represent feminine rhymes while the lowercase letters represent masculine rhymes. This original structure is known as the "Onegin stanza" or "Pushkin sonnet".

The story is told by a narrator (a lightly fictionalized version of Pushkin's public image), whose tone is educated, worldly, and intimate. The narrator digresses at times, usually to expand on aspects of this social and intellectual world. This narrative style allows for a development of the characters and emphasizes the drama of the plot despite its relative simplicity. The book is admired for the artfulness of its verse narrative as well as for its exploration of life, death, love, ennui, convention, and passion.

== Main characters ==
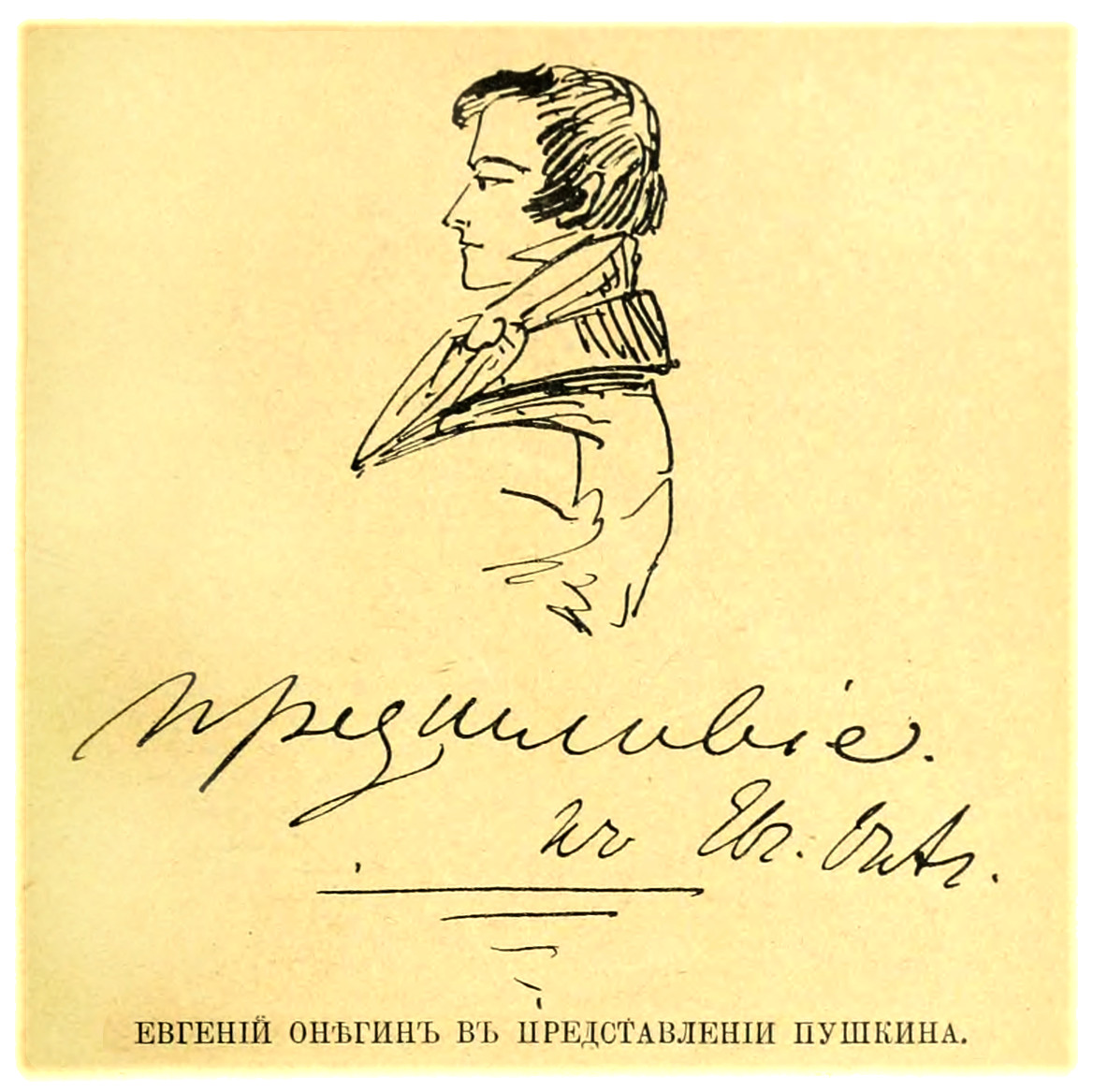
Eugene Onegin as imagined by Alexander Pushkin, 1830.

- Eugene Onegin: A dandy from Saint Petersburg, aged 18 at the start of the novel, and 26 by the end. An arrogant, selfish, and world-weary cynic.
- Vladimir Lensky: A young poet, about 18. A very romantic and naïve dreamer. He became friends with Onegin, but later Onegin kills him in a duel.
- Tatyana Larina: A shy and quiet, but passionate, landowner's daughter. Pushkin referred to her as aged 17 in a letter to Pyotr Vyazemsky. She falls in love with Onegin, but he rejects her. Years later, they meet again, he falls for her, but she rejects him.
- Olga Larina: Tatyana's younger sister. She was Lensky's fiancé.

== Plot ==
In the 1820s, Eugene Onegin is a bored St. Petersburg dandy, whose life consists of balls, concerts, parties, and nothing more. Upon the death of a wealthy uncle, he inherits a substantial fortune and a landed estate. When he moves to the country, he strikes up a friendship with his neighbor, a starry-eyed young poet named Vladimir Lensky. Lensky takes Onegin to dine with the family of his fiancée, the sociable but rather thoughtless Olga Larina. At this meeting, he also catches a glimpse of Olga's sister Tatyana. A quiet, precocious romantic, and the exact opposite of Olga, Tatyana becomes intensely drawn to Onegin. Soon after, she bares her soul to Onegin in a letter professing her love. Contrary to her expectations, Onegin does not write back. When they meet in person, he rejects her advances politely but dismissively and condescendingly. This famous speech is often referred to as Onegin's Sermon: he admits that the letter was touching, but says that he would quickly grow bored with marriage and can only offer Tatyana friendship; he coldly advises more emotional control in the future, lest another man take advantage of her innocence.

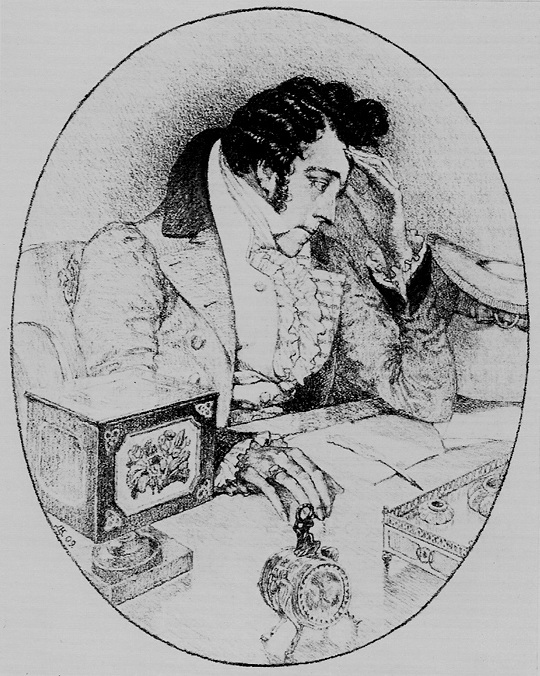
Onegin by Dmitry Kardovsky, 1909

Later, Lensky mischievously invites Onegin to Tatyana's name day celebration, promising a small gathering with just Tatyana, Olga, and their parents. When Onegin arrives, he finds instead a boisterous country ball, a rural parody of and contrast to the society balls of St. Petersburg of which he has grown tired. Onegin is irritated with the guests who gossip about him and Tatyana, and with Lensky for persuading him to come. He decides to avenge himself by dancing and flirting with Olga. Olga is insensitive to her fiancé and apparently attracted to Onegin. Earnest and inexperienced, Lensky is wounded to the core and challenges Onegin to fight a duel; Onegin reluctantly accepts, feeling compelled by social convention. During the duel, Onegin unwillingly kills Lensky. Afterwards, he quits his country estate, traveling abroad to deaden his feelings of remorse.

Tatyana visits Onegin's mansion, where she looks through his books and his notes in the margins, and begins to question whether Onegin's character is merely a collage of different literary heroes, and if there is, in fact, no "real Onegin". Tatyana, still brokenhearted by the loss of Onegin, is persuaded by her parents to live with her aunt in Moscow to find a suitor.

Several years pass, and the scene shifts to St. Petersburg. Onegin has come to attend the most prominent balls and interact with the leaders of old Russian society. He sees a woman who captures the attention of all and is central to society's whirl, and he realizes that it is the same Tatyana whose love he had once spurned. Now she is married to an aged prince (a general). Upon seeing Tatyana again, he becomes obsessed with winning her affection, despite her being married. His attempts are rebuffed. He writes her several letters, but receives no reply. Eventually, Onegin manages to see Tatyana and offers her the opportunity to finally elope after they have become reacquainted. She recalls the days when they might have been happy, but concludes that that time has passed. Onegin repeats his love for her. Faltering for a moment, she admits that she still loves him, but she will not allow him to ruin her and declares her determination to remain faithful to her husband. She leaves him regretting his bitter destiny.

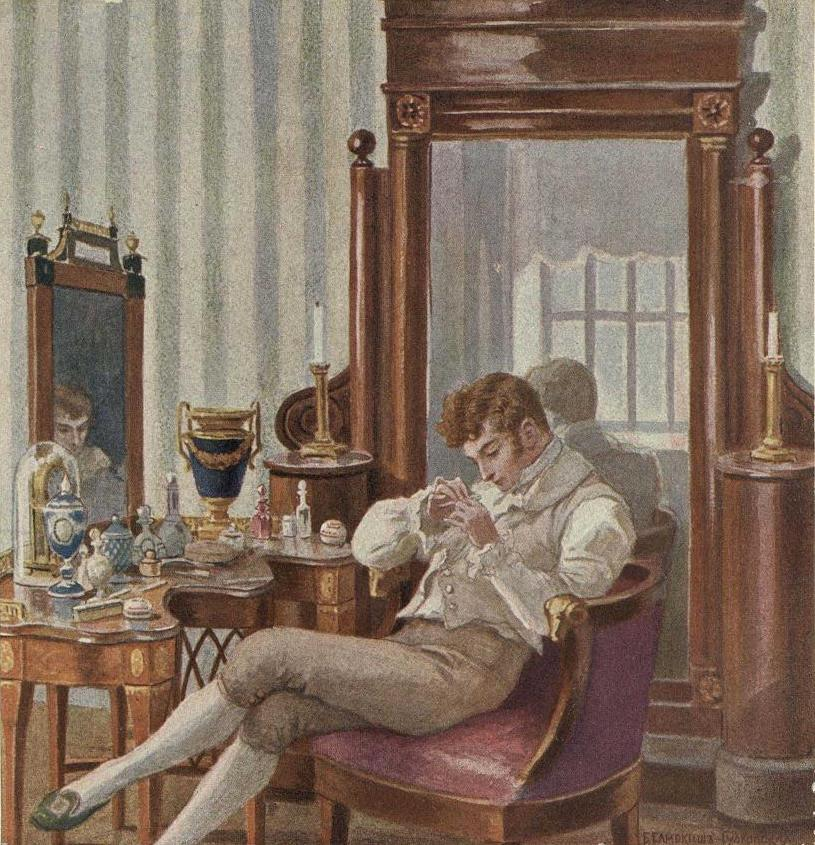
Onegin by Elena Samokysh-Sudkovskaya, 1918

== Composition and publication ==
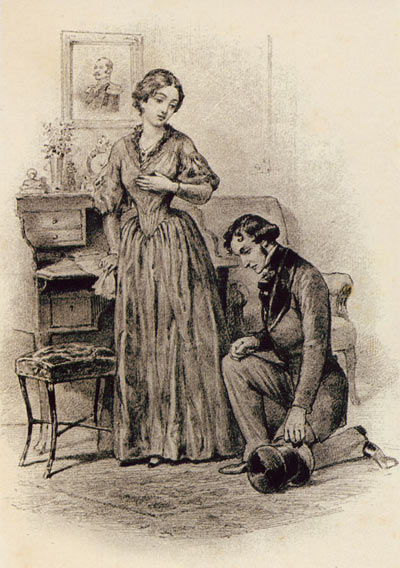
Onegin proposes to Tatyana, late 19th-century illustration by Pavel Sokolov

As with many other 19th-century novels, Onegin was written and published serially, with parts of each chapter often appearing in magazines before the first printing of each chapter. Many changes, some small and some large, were made from the first appearance to the final edition during Pushkin's lifetime. The following dates mostly come from Nabokov's study of the photographs of Pushkin's drafts that were available at the time, as well as other people's work on the subject.

The first stanza of chapter 1 was started on May 9, 1823, and except for three stanzas (XXXIII, XVIII, and XIX), the chapter was finished on October 22. The remaining stanzas were completed and added to his notebook by the first week of October 1824. Chapter 1 was first published as a whole in a booklet on February 16, 1825, with a foreword which suggests that Pushkin had no clear plan on how (or even whether) he would continue the novel.

Chapter 2 was started on October 22, 1823 (the date when most of chapter 1 had been finished), and finished by December 8, except for stanzas XL and XXXV, which were added sometime over the next three months. The first separate edition of chapter 2 appeared on October 20, 1826.

Many events occurred which interrupted the writing of chapter 3. In January 1824, Pushkin stopped work on Onegin to work on The Gypsies. Except for XXV, stanzas I–XXXI were added on September 25, 1824. Nabokov guesses that Tatyana's Letter was written in Odessa between February 8 and May 31, 1824. Pushkin incurred the displeasure of the Tsarist regime in Odessa and was restricted to his family estate Mikhaylovskoye in Pskov for two years. He left Odessa on July 21, 1824, and arrived on August 9. Writing resumed on September 5, and chapter 3 was finished (apart from stanza XXXVI) on October 2. The first separate publication of chapter 3 was on October 10, 1827.

Chapter 4 was started in October 1824. By the end of the year, Pushkin had written 23 stanzas and had reached XXVII by January 5, 1825, at which point he started writing stanzas for Onegin's Journey and worked on other pieces of writing. He thought that it was finished on September 12, 1825, but later continued the process of rearranging, adding, and omitting stanzas until the first week of 1826. The first separate edition of chapter 4 appeared with chapter 5 in a publication produced between January 31 and February 2, 1828.

The writing of chapter 5 began on January 4, 1826, and 24 stanzas were complete before the start of his trip to petition the Tsar for his freedom. He left for this trip on September 4 and returned on November 2, 1826. He completed the rest of the chapter in the week November 15 to 22, 1826. The first separate edition of chapter 5 appeared with chapter 4 in a publication produced between January 31 and February 2, 1828.

When Nabokov carried out his study on the writing of Onegin, the manuscript of chapter 6 was lost, but it is known that Pushkin started chapter 6 before finishing chapter 5. Most of chapter 6 appears to have been written before the beginning of December 19, 1826, when Pushkin returned to Moscow after exile on his family estate. Many stanzas appeared to have been written between November 22 and 25, 1826. On March 23, 1828, the first separate edition of chapter 6 was published.

Pushkin started writing chapter 7 in March 1827, but aborted his original plan for the plot of the chapter and started on a different tack, completing the chapter on November 4, 1828. The first separate edition of chapter 7 was first printed on March 18, 1836.

Pushkin intended to write a chapter called "Onegin's Journey", which occurred between the events of chapters 7 and 8, and in fact was supposed to be the eighth chapter. Fragments of this incomplete chapter were published, in the same way that parts of each chapter had been published in magazines before each chapter was first published in a separate edition. When Pushkin completed chapter 8, he published it as the final chapter and included within its denouement the line nine cantos I have written, still intending to complete this missing chapter. When Pushkin finally decided to abandon this chapter, he removed parts of the ending to fit with the change.

Chapter 8 was begun before December 24, 1829, while Pushkin was in St. Petersburg. In August 1830, he went to Boldino (the Pushkin family estate) where, due to an epidemic of cholera, he was forced to stay for three months. During this time, he produced what Nabokov describes as an "incredible number of masterpieces" and finished copying out chapter 8 on September 25, 1830. During the summer of 1831, Pushkin revised and completed chapter 8 apart from "Onegin's Letter", which was completed on October 5, 1831. The first separate edition of chapter 8 appeared on January 10, 1832.

Pushkin wrote at least 18 stanzas of a never-completed tenth chapter. It contained many satires and even direct criticism on contemporary Russian rulers, including the Emperor himself. Afraid of being prosecuted for dissidence, Pushkin burnt most of the tenth chapter. Very little of it survived in Pushkin's notebooks.

The first complete edition of the book was published in 1833. Slight corrections were made by Pushkin for the 1837 edition. The standard accepted text is based on the 1837 edition with a few changes due to the Tsar's censorship restored.

== The duel ==
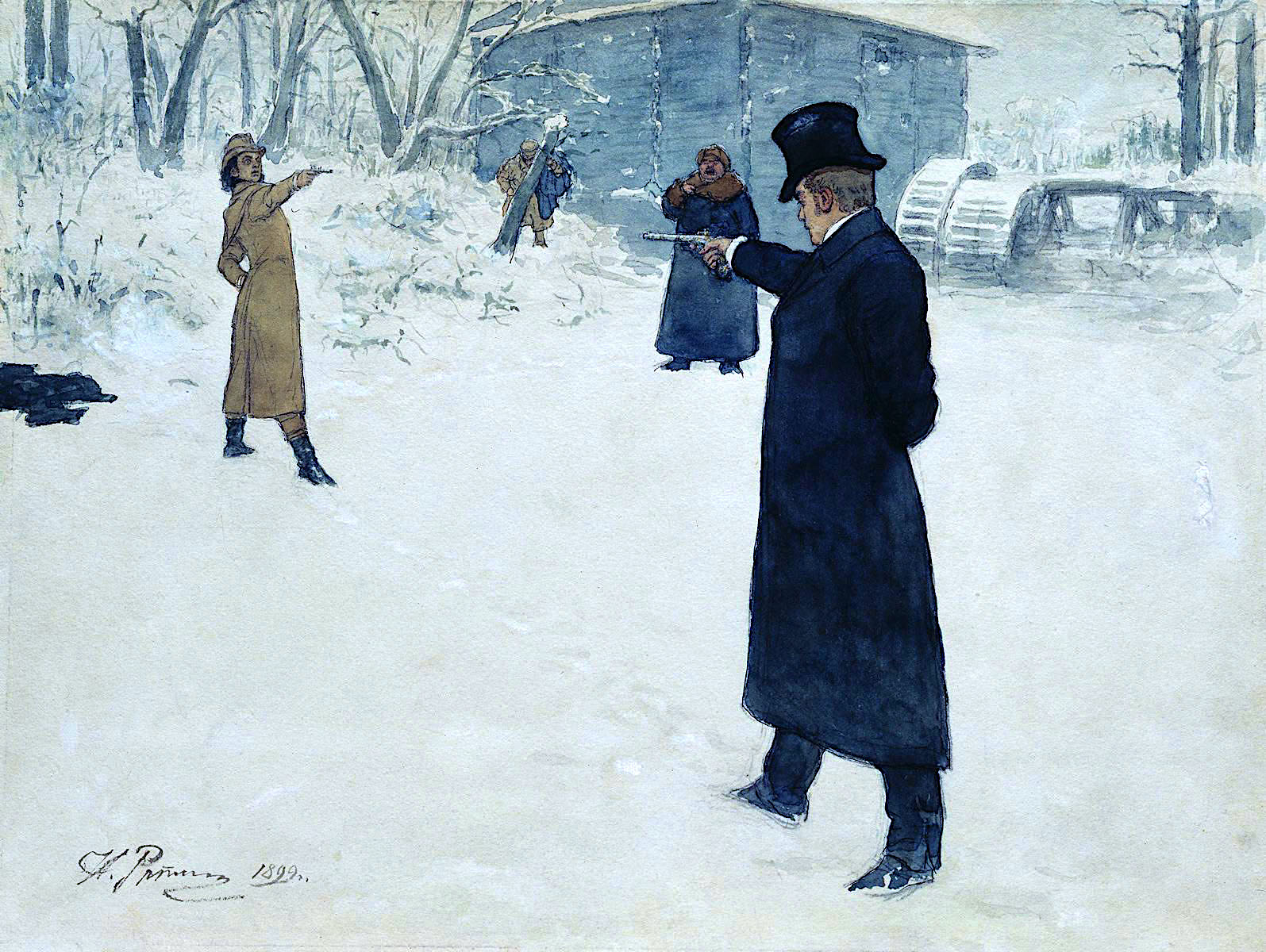
The pistol duel between Onegin and Lensky. Watercolour by Ilya Repin (1899)

In Pushkin's time, the early 19th century, duels were very strictly regulated. A second's primary duty was to prevent the duel from actually happening, and only when both combatants were unwilling to stand down were they to make sure that the duel proceeded according to formalised rules. A challenger's second should therefore always ask the challenged party if he wants to apologise for the actions that have led to the challenge. In Eugene Onegin, Lensky's second, Zaretsky, does not ask Onegin even once if he would like to apologise, and because Onegin is not allowed to apologise on his own initiative, the duel takes place, with fatal consequences. Zaretsky is described as "classical and pedantic in duels" (chapter 6, stanza XXVI), and this seems very out of character for a nobleman. In effect, he is enthusiastic at the prospect of a duel and callous about its deadly possibilities. Zaretsky's first chance to end the duel is when he delivers Lensky's written challenge to Onegin (chapter 6, stanza IX). Instead of asking Onegin if he would like to apologise, he apologises for having much to do at home and leaves as soon as Onegin (obligatorily) accepts the challenge.

On the day of the duel, Zaretsky gets several more chances to prevent the duel from happening. Because dueling was forbidden in the Russian Empire, duels were always held at dawn. Zaretsky urges Lensky to get ready shortly after 6 o'clock in the morning (chapter 6, stanza XXIII), while the sun only rises at 20 past 8, because he expects Onegin to be on time. However, Onegin oversleeps (chapter 6, stanza XXIV), and arrives on the scene more than an hour late. According to the dueling codex, if a duelist arrives more than 15 minutes late, he automatically forfeits the duel. Lensky and Zaretsky have been waiting all that time (chapter 6, stanza XXVI), even though it was Zaretsky's duty to proclaim Lensky winner and take him home.

When Onegin finally arrives, Zaretsky is supposed to ask him a final time if he would like to apologise. Instead, Zaretsky is surprised by the apparent absence of Onegin's second. Onegin, against all rules, appoints his servant Guillot as his second (chapter 6, stanza XXVII), a blatant insult for the nobleman Zaretsky. Zaretsky angrily accepts Guillot as Onegin's second. By his actions, Zaretsky does not act as a nobleman should; in the end Onegin wins the duel.

Onegin himself, however, tried as he could to prevent the fatal outcome, and killed Lensky unwillingly and almost by accident. As the first shooter, he couldn't deliberately miss the opponent: this was considered a serious insult and could create a formal reason to arrange another duel. Instead, he tried to minimize his chances of hitting Lensky by shooting without precise aim, from the maximum possible distance, not even trying to come closer and get a clear shot.

== Translations ==
Translators of Eugene Onegin have all had to adopt a trade-off between precision and preservation of poetic imperatives. This particular challenge and the importance of Eugene Onegin in Russian literature have resulted in a large number of competing translations.

=== Into English ===
==== Arndt and Nabokov ====
Walter W. Arndt's 1963 translation (ISBN 0-87501-106-3) was written keeping to the strict rhyme scheme of the Onegin stanza and won the Bollingen Prize for translation. It is still considered one of the best translations.

Vladimir Nabokov severely criticised Arndt's translation, as he had criticised many previous (and later) translations. Nabokov's main criticism of Arndt's and other translations is that they sacrificed literalness and exactness for the sake of preserving the melody and rhyme.

Accordingly, in 1964 he published his own translation, consisting of four volumes, which conformed scrupulously to the sense while completely eschewing melody and rhyme. The first volume contains an introduction by Nabokov and the text of the translation. The Introduction discusses the structure of the novel, the Onegin stanza in which it is written, and Pushkin's opinion of Onegin (using Pushkin's letters to his friends); it likewise gives a detailed account of both the time over which Pushkin wrote Onegin and of the various forms in which the various parts of it appeared in publication before Pushkin's death (after which there is a huge proliferation of the number of different editions). The second and third volumes consist of very detailed and rigorous notes to the text. The fourth volume contains a facsimile of the 1837 edition. The discussion of the Onegin stanza in the first volume contains the poem On Translating "Eugene Onegin", which first appeared in print in The New Yorker on January 8, 1955, and is written in two Onegin stanzas. Nabokov reproduces the poem both so that the reader of his translation would have some experience of this unique form, and also to act as a further defence of his decision to write his translation in prose.

Nabokov's previously close friend Edmund Wilson reviewed Nabokov's translation in the New York Review of Books, which sparked an exchange of letters and an enduring falling-out between them.

John Bayley has described Nabokov's commentary as '"by far the most erudite as well as the most fascinating commentary in English on Pushkin's poem", and "as scrupulously accurate, in terms of grammar, sense and phrasing, as it is idiosyncratic and Nabokovian in its vocabulary". It is generally agreed that Nabokov's translation is extremely accurate.

==== Other English translations ====
Henry Spalding published a translation in 1881. Ivan Turgenev called his translation astonishingly faithful, and the text remained the only complete translation for fifty years. Even later, the Russian critic Ernest Simmons praised Spalding for his translation and scholarly notes on Pushkin's novel in verse.

Babette Deutsch published a translation in 1935 that preserved the Onegin stanzas.

The Pushkin Press published a translation in 1937 (reprinted 1943) by the Oxford scholar Oliver Elton, with illustrations by M. V. Dobujinsky.

In 1977, Sir Charles Johnston published another translation trying to preserve the Onegin stanza, which is generally considered to surpass Arndt's. Johnston's translation is influenced by Nabokov. Vikram Seth's novel The Golden Gate was in turn inspired by this translation.

James E. Falen (professor of Russian at the University of Tennessee) published a translation in 1990 which was also influenced by Nabokov's translation, but preserved the Onegin stanzas (ISBN 0809316307). This translation is considered to be the most faithful to Pushkin's spirit according to Russian critics and translators.

Douglas Hofstadter published a translation in 1999, again preserving the Onegin stanzas, after having summarised the controversy (and severely criticised Nabokov's attitude towards verse translation) in his book Le Ton beau de Marot. Hofstadter's translation employs a unique lexicon of both high and low register words, as well as unexpected and almost reaching rhymes that give the work a comedic flair.

Tom Beck published a translation in 2004 that also preserved the Onegin stanzas. (ISBN 1-903517-28-1)

Wordsworths Classics in 2005 published an English prose translation by Roger Clarke, which sought to retain the lyricism of Pushkin's Russian.

In September 2008, Stanley Mitchell, emeritus professor of aesthetics at the University of Derby, published, through Penguin Books, a complete translation, again preserving the Onegin stanzas in English. (ISBN 978-0-140-44810-8)

In 2022, Robert E. Tanner published a translation that preserved the Onegin stanzas and incorporated background and historical information in the interstices provided by the translation from Russian to English. (ISBN 978-0-9990737-5-9)

There are a number of lesser known English translations, at least 45 as of 2016.

=== Into other languages ===
==== French ====
There are at least eight published French translations of Eugene Onegin. The most recent appeared in 2005: the translator, André Markovicz, respects Pushkin's original stanzas. Other translations include those of Paul Béesau (1868), Gaston Pérot (1902, in verse), Nata Minor (who received the Prix Nelly Sachs, given to the best translation into French of poetry), Roger Legras, Maurice Colin, Michel Bayat, and Jean-Louis Backès (who does not preserve the stanzas). As a 20-year-old, former French President Jacques Chirac also wrote a translation, which was never published.

==== German ====
There are at least a dozen published translations of Onegin in German.

- Carl Friedrich von der Borg, Eugenius Onegin, of which the first part was published in "Der Refraktor. Ein Centralblatt Deutschen Lebens in Russland", Dorpat, 1836, in five series, starting with the 14th issue on August 1, 1836, and ending with the 18th issue on August 29, 1836.
- R. Lippert, Verlag von Wilhelm Engelmann, Leipzig 1840
- Friedrich von Bodenstedt, Verlag der Deckerschen Geheimen Ober-Hofbuchdruckerei, Berlin 1854
- Adolf Seubert, Reclam, Leipzig 1872/73
- Dr. Blumenthal, Moscow 1878
- Dr. Alexis Lupus, nur das 1. Kapitel, Leipzig and St. Petersburg 1899
- Theodor Commichau, Verlag G. Müller, Munich and Leipzig 1916
- Theodor Commichau and Arthur Luther, 1923
- Theodor Commichau, Arthur Luther and Maximilian Schick, SWA-Verlag, Leipzig and Berlin 1947
- Elfriede Eckardt-Skalberg, Verlag Bühler, Baden-Baden 1947
- Johannes von Guenther, Reclam, Leipzig 1949
- Theodor Commichau and Konrad Schmidt, Weimar 1958
- Theodor Commichau and Martin Remané, Reclam, Leipzig 1965
- Manfred von der Ropp and Felix Zielinski, Winkler, Munich 1972
- Kay Borowsky, Reclam, Stuttgart 1972 (translation of prose)
- Rolf-Dietrich Keil, Wilhelm Schmitz Verlag, Gießen 1980
- Ulrich Busch, Manesse Verlag, Zurich 1981
- Sabine Baumann, unter Mitarbeit von Christiane Körner, Stroemfeld, Frankfurt am Main 2009
- Viktor Eduard Prieb, Goldene Rakete, Berlin 2018.

==== Italian ====
There are several Italian translations of Onegin. One of the earliest was published by G. Cassone in 1906. Ettore Lo Gatto translated the novel twice, in 1922 in prose and in 1950 in hendecasyllables. More recent translations are those by Giovanni Giudici (a first version in 1975, a second one in 1990, in lines of unequal length) and by Pia Pera (1996).

==== Hebrew ====
- Avraham Shlonsky, 1937
- Avraham Levinson, 1937
- Yoel Netz, 2012
- Ze'ev Geyzel, 2023

==== Esperanto ====
- An edition translated by Nikolao Nekrasov, published by Sennacieca Asocio Tutmonda in 1931.

==== Spanish ====
- Eugene Onegin was given a direct Spanish translation preserving the original Russian poetic form with notes and illustrations by Alberto Musso Nicholas, published by Mendoza, Argentina, Zeta Publishers in April 2005.
- Mijail Chílikov does a metrical verse translation, without rhymes (Madrid, Cátedra, 2005)
- Other Spanish translations are in prose: Alexis Marcoff's Eugenio Onieguin (Barcelona, Ediciones del Zodíaco, 1942), by Irene Tchernova (Madrid, Aguilar, 1945), by Teresa Suero, probably from English (Barcelona, Bruguera, 1969).

==== Catalan ====
- Arnau Barios translated the work preserving Pushkin's original stanzas and rhymes, and it was published by Club Editor in 2019.
- Xavier Roca-Ferrer translated the novel in Catalan prose, published in Barcelona, Columna, 2001.

==== Japanese ====
There are 6 or more Japanese translations of Eugene Onegin. The first two versions were published in 1921, but the most popular version was a prose translation by Kentaro Ikeda in 1964. The latest translation was one by Masao Ozawa, published in 1996, in which Ozawa attempted to translate Onegin into the form of Japanese poetry.

==== Chinese ====
Since the first Chinese version translated by Su Fu in 1942 and the first translation from original Russian version in 1944 by Lu Yin, there have been more than 10 versions translated into Chinese. In the 21st century there are still new Chinese versions being published.

==== Arabic ====
Eugene Onegin was translated from Russian into Arabic by the historian and researcher Abdel Hadi Al-Dheisat (عبد الهادي الدهيسات) in 2003, and the Arabic translation is in verse and took over 4 years to be completed.

== Film, TV, radio or theatrical adaptations ==
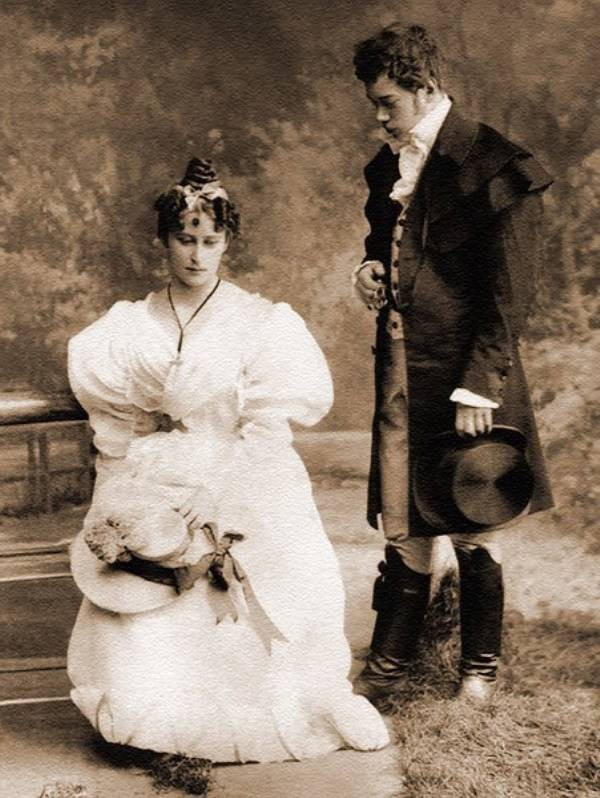
Nicholas of Russia and Elisabeth of Hesse as Eugene and Tatyana

=== Opera ===
The 1879 opera Eugene Onegin, by Tchaikovsky, based on the story, is perhaps the version that most people are familiar with. There are many recordings of the score, and it is one of the most commonly performed operas in the world.

=== Ballet ===
John Cranko choreographed a three-act ballet using Tchaikovsky's music in an arrangement by Kurt-Heinz Stolze. However, Stolze did not use any music from Tchaikovsky's opera of the same name. Instead, he orchestrated some little-known piano works by Tchaikovsky such as The Seasons, along with themes from the opera Cherevichki and the latter part of the symphonic fantasia Francesca da Rimini.

Choreographer Boris Eifman staged a modern rendition of Eugene Onegin as a ballet taking place in modern Moscow. The ballet was performed by Eifman Ballet of St. Petersburg, with music by Alexander Sitkovetsky and with excerpts from Tchaikovsky's opera Eugene Onegin.

More recently Lera Auerbach created a ballet score titled Tatiana, with a libretto written by John Neumeier for his choreographic interpretation and staging of Alexander Pushkin's Eugene Onegin, for a co-production by the Hamburg State Opera and the Stanislavski and Nemirovich-Danchenko Moscow Academic Music Theatre in Moscow.

Choreographer Yuri Possokhov and composer Ilya Demutsky have collaborated on a full-length production of Eugene Onegin, which will have its Chicago premiere on June 4, 2026, in a co-production by the Joffrey Ballet and the San Francisco Ballet.

=== Incidental music ===
A staged version was adapted by Sigizmund Krzhizhanovsky and slated for production in the Soviet Union in 1936, directed by Alexander Tairov and with incidental music by Sergei Prokofiev, as part of the centennial celebration of Pushkin's death. However, due to threats of Stalinist repercussions for artistic liberties taken during the production and artistic differences between Tairov and Krzhizhanovsky, rehearsals were abandoned and the production was never put on.

=== Play ===
Christopher Webber's play Tatyana was written for Nottingham Playhouse in 1989. It successfully combines spoken dialogue and narration from the novel, with music arranged from Tchaikovsky's operatic score, and incorporates some striking theatrical sequences inspired by Tatyana's dreams in the original. The title role was played by Josie Lawrence, and the director was Pip Broughton.

In 2016, the legendary Vakhtangov State Academic Theatre of Russia put on a production of Onegin starring Sergei Makovetsky, described as "exuberant, indelible, and arrestingly beautiful" by the New York Times.

=== Musical ===
Opening in 2016 for its world premiere, the Arts Club Theatre Company in Vancouver, Canada, staged a musical version called Onegin by Amiel Gladstone and Veda Hille. Rather than being based solely on Pushkin's verse narrative, the musical takes equal inspiration from Tchaikovsky's opera, subtly incorporating musical motifs from the opera and even using its structure as a template. In fact, it was Gladstone's time as assistant director for Vancouver Opera's last production of Tchaikovsky's Eugene Onegin that opened his eyes to the story's potential for musical adaptation.

However, the overall musical style of Gladstone and Hille's Onegin is distinctly non-operatic, being instead "an indie-rock musical with a modern flair" that carries over into the costumes and the interactive staging, as well as the ironic and self-referential humour and the titular character's "bored hipster persona".

After opening to general acclaim in 2016, Onegin took home a historic 10 Jessie Awards, winning all but one award in its category, including the awards for outstanding production, direction (Gladstone), original composition (Gladstone and Hille), lead actor (Alessandro Juliani as Onegin), lead actress (Meg Roe as Tatyana), and supporting actor (Josh Epstein as Lensky).

Since then, throughout new productions and casting changes, Onegin has garnered generally favourable reviews; for example, Louis B. Hobson of The Calgary Herald writes, "Onegin is not just good, but totally enthralling and deserves all the hype and all the awards it received in Vancouver back in 2016 when it premiered and again in 2017 during its return visit". Nevertheless, others have criticized the show for artificiality of characterization and "inconsistent dramaturgy", claiming that Onegin fails to "come to life".

Furthermore, several critics have pointed out similarities to the smash hit Hamilton and especially to Natasha, Pierre & The Great Comet of 1812, a sung-through musical likewise inspired by a classic of Russian literature (in this case, a sliver of Leo Tolstoy's War and Peace), usually to Onegin's disadvantage.

=== Film ===
- In 1911, the first screen version of the novel was filmed: the Russian silent film Yevgeni Onegin ("Eugene Onegin"), directed by Vasily Goncharov and starring Arseniy Bibikov, Petr Birjukov, and Pyotr Chardynin.
- In 1919, a silent film Eugen Onegin, based on the novel, was produced in Germany. The film was directed by Alfred Halm, and starred Frederic Zelnik as Onegin.
- In 1958, Lenfilm produced a TV film Eugene Onegin, which was not in fact a screen version of the novel, but a screen version of the opera Eugene Onegin by Tchaikovsky. The film was directed by Roman Tikhomirov and starred Vadim Medvedev as Onegin, Ariadna Shengelaya as Tatyana, and Igor Ozerov as Lensky. The principal solo parts were performed by notable opera singers of the Bolshoi Theatre. The film was well received by critics and viewers.
- In 1972, Zweites Deutsches Fernsehen (ZDF) produced a music film Eugen Onegin.
- In 1988, Decca/Channel 4 produced a film adaptation of Tchaikovsky's opera, directed by Petr Weigl. Sir Georg Solti acted as the conductor, while the cast featured Michal Dočolomanský as Onegin and Magdaléna Vášáryová as Tatyana. One major difference from the novel is the duel: Onegin is presented as deliberately shooting to kill Lensky and is unrepentant at the end.
- In 1994, the TV film Yevgeny Onyegin was produced, directed by Humphrey Burton and starring Wojtek Drabowicz as Onyegin.
- The 1999 film, Onegin, is an English adaptation of Pushkin's work, directed by Martha Fiennes, and starring Ralph Fiennes as Onegin, Liv Tyler as Tatyana, and Toby Stephens as Lensky. The film compresses the events of the novel somewhat: for example, the name day celebrations take place on the same day as Onegin's speech to Tatyana. The 1999 film, much like the 1988 film, also gives the impression that during the duel sequence Onegin deliberately shoots to kill.

=== Radio ===
In 2017, BBC Radio 4 broadcast a five-part adaptation by Duncan Macmillan, directed by Abigail le Fleming, as part of their 15-Minute Drama series, with Geoffrey Streatfeild as Pushkin, David Dawson as Onegin, Zoë Tapper as Natalya, Alix Wilton Regan as Tatyana, Joshua McGuire as Lensky, and Sean Murray as Zaretsky.

=== Audiobook ===
In 2012, Stephen Fry recorded an audiobook of the novel in the translation by James E. Falen.
