= When the Song Does Not End =

1965 Soviet film

- Directed by: Roman Tikhomirov
- Screenplay by: Anatoli Badkhen
- Starring: Aleksandr Bronevitskiy; Muslim Magomayev; Georg Ots; Edita Piekha; Arkady Raykin; Lyudmila Zykina
- Music by: Andrey Petrov; Georgi Portnov; Vasily Solovyov-Sedoi; Viktor Fyodorov; Georgy Firtich
- Release date: 1965
- Running time: 82 minutes
- Country: USSR
- Language: Russian

When the Song Does Not End (Russian: Когда песня не кончается) is a 1965 Soviet musical film revue, directed by Roman Tikhomirov and produced by the Leningrad Film Studio. It features music by Andrey Petrov, Georgi Portnov, Vasily Solovyov-Sedoi, Viktor Fyodorov, and Georgy Firtich. Among other things, it is notable for being Edita Piekha's screen début. The film features the first recording of Nikolai Kapustin's piece "Toccata", op.8.

== Synopsis ==
During the Leningrad summer music festival, a young police lieutenant falls in love with Svetlana, a beautiful singer. Meanwhile, reporters Kostya and Bob do their best to document the various musical performances.

== Cast ==
- Aleksandr Bronevitskiy
- Muslim Magomayev
- Georg Ots
- Edita Piekha, as Svetlana
- Arkady Raykin
- Lyudmila Zykina
