= Bübüsara Beyshenalieva =

Kyrgyzstani ballet dancer

- Бүбүсара Бейшеналиева
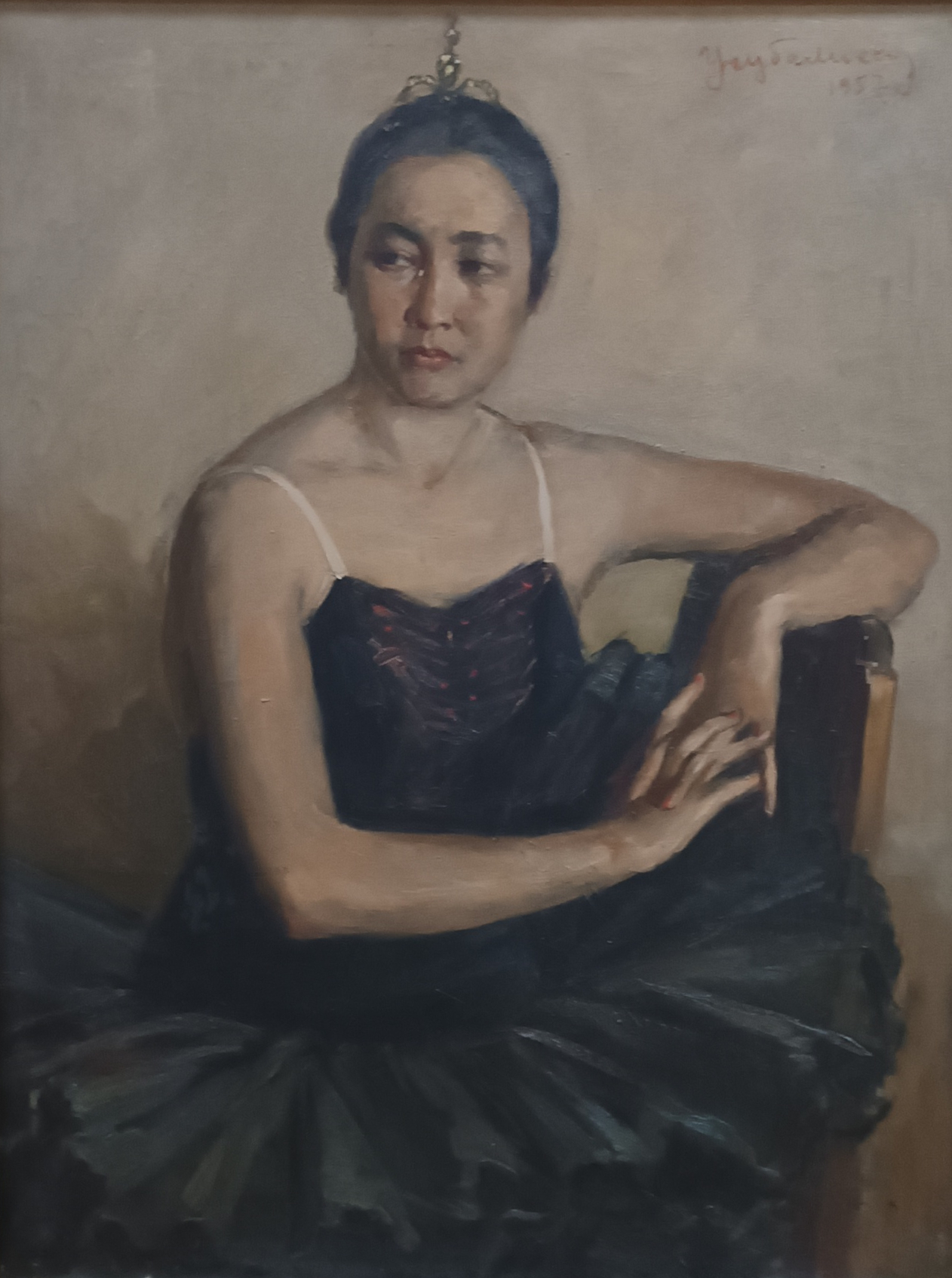
- Portrait by Altymysh Usubaliev
- Born: September 15, 1926; Vorontsovka, Kirghiz ASSR, Russian SFSR, Soviet Union
- Died: May 10, 1973 (aged 46); Bishkek, Kyrgyzstan
- Education: Vaganova Ballet Academy
- Occupation: Ballerina

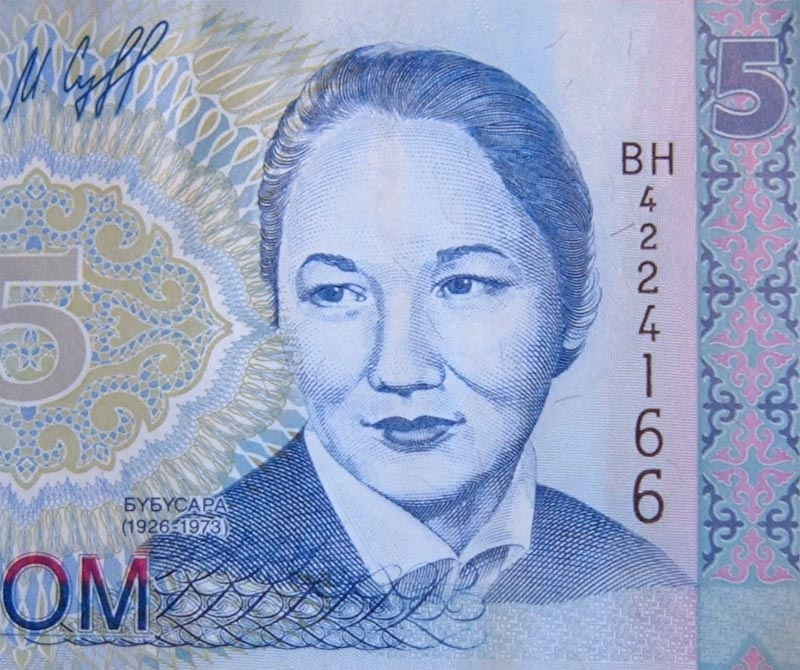
Beyshenalieva on the Kyrgyz 5 som note

Bübüsara Beyshenalieva (Note: Kyrgyz: Бүбүсара Бейшеналиева, romanized: Bu̇bu̇sara Beĭshenalieva; Russian: Бюбюсара Бейшеналиева, romanized: Byubyusara Beyshenaliyeva) (1926 – 1973, known mononymously as Bübüsara) was the first great Kyrgyz ballerina. She was born in the village of Vorontsovka (now Tash-Döbö), Kirghiz ASSR on 15 September 1926. She studied at the Vaganova Ballet Academy in Leningrad under the legendary Russian ballerina Agrippina Vaganova and made her debut at the famed Bolshoi Theatre in Moscow.

In 1944, after performing the part of Cholpon in the Kyrgyz ballet of the same name, Bübüsara became the prima ballerina of the Kyrgyz ballet. She performed the part of Ai-Dai in Roman Tikhomirov's 1959 screen version of Cholpon. Later in life she became a ballet teacher and professor of the Kyrgyz National Ballet School. She died on 10 May 1973.

Bübüsara appears on the Kyrgyz 5 som note, and a statue of her can be found in Bishkek near of the Kyrgyz opera and ballet theatre.

== Filmography ==
- 1959 – Morning Star (in the part of Ai-Dai)
