= The Serf Actress =

- Russian: Крепостная актриса
- Directed by: Roman Tikhomirov
- Written by: Solomon Fogelson; Yevgeni Gerken; Anatoli Zakharov
- Produced by: Yuri Jorogov
- Starring: Tamara Syomina; Yevgeny Leonov; Dmitri Smirnov; Sergey Yursky; Grenada Mnatsakanova
- Cinematography: Yevgeni Shapiro
- Edited by: Mariya Pen
- Music by: Nikolai Strelnikov
- Production company: Lenfilm
- Release date: 1963
- Running time: 101 min.
- Country: Soviet Union
- Language: Russian

The Serf Actress (Russian: Крепостная актриса, romanized: Krepostnaya aktrisa) is a 1963 Soviet musical film directed by Roman Tikhomirov.

The film tells about the serf Nastya Batmanova, who was able to make a successful acting career in the court theater. She travels around the world, and when she returns, she finds herself in the Kutaysov's mansion among hussars and ladies, and there in her soul a feeling of love is born.

== Plot ==
The events take place in the estate of Count Kutaisov in 1801. A great patron of the arts, the count maintains an entire serf theater on his estate. The household eagerly prepares for the arrival of the famous actress Anastasia Batmanova, a former serf of the count who was freed and sold as a child. At the same time, Prince Andrei Tumansky, secretly in love with Anastasia, also arrives at the estate. Andrei is the illegitimate son of Prince Baturin and a serf woman. Sent away to Paris by his father, Andrei first saw Anastasia perform there and fell deeply in love.

At the estate, Andrei is greeted by his half-brother, hussar Nikita Baturin. Their father has recently died, leaving behind debts, and Kutaisov has purchased the Baturin estate along with its serfs. Andrei’s freedom papers have been lost, leaving him vulnerable to the whims of the tyrannical count.

Kutaisov plans to make Anastasia the star of his theater, but she refuses. Rebuffed, the count decides to marry her off to Andrei, who, due to the missing papers, is technically still a serf. The count promises Andrei and Nikita that he will sign Andrei's freedom papers after the wedding. Feelings develop between Anastasia and Andrei, and they agree to marry. However, immediately after the ceremony, the count reveals his true intentions: he tears up the freedom papers and declares Anastasia his "slave."

With the help of Nikita's cunning servant, Mitka, the young couple disguises themselves as peasants and escapes the estate. Enraged, Kutaisov plans to pursue them. Nikita and his hussar regiment storm the count’s quarters and offer to buy the couple’s freedom for 20,000 rubles. When the count refuses, Nikita bluffs, claiming that Emperor Paul I has recently died, putting Kutaisov’s favor with the crown at risk.

As the lie is about to be exposed, a messenger arrives from St. Petersburg with news confirming Paul I's death and the ascension of Alexander I to the throne. Fearing he has fallen out of favor, Kutaisov reluctantly signs Andrei’s freedom papers. The newlyweds leave the estate on the count’s finest troika.

Soon after, another messenger arrives, confirming Kutaisov's loyalty to the new emperor. Relieved, the count orders the couple's capture, but they are already far away.

== Cast ==
- Tamara Syomina as Anastasiya Batmanova (voiced by Tamara Milashkina)
- Yevgeny Leonov as Count Ivan Pavlovich Kutaysov
- Dmitri Smirnov as Prince Andrei Tumansky
- Sergey Yursky as Prince Nikita Petrovich Baturin
- Grenada Mnatsakanova as Polenka
- Aleksandr Potapov as Mitka
- Sergey Filippov as Ruler of Yelpidifor
- Glikeriya Bogdanova-Chesnokova as Primadonna Glikeriya Orestovna Rykalova
- Marina Polbentseva as Avdotya Lytkina
- Aleksei Smirnov as singer
