= Morning Star (1959 film) =

1959 film directed by Roman Tikhomirov

Morning star
- Directed by: Roman Tikhomirov
- Written by: Apollinari Dudko; Isaac Menaker; Roman Tikhomirov; Nurdin Tugelov
- Starring: Reina Chokoyeva; Uran Sarbagishev; Nurdin Tugelov; Bubusara Beyshenalieva; Sapar Abduzhalilov
- Cinematography: Apollinari Dudko
- Edited by: Isaac Glikman
- Music by: Mikhail Raukhverger
- Production companies: Lenfilm; Frunze Film Studios
- Distributed by: Artkino Pictures
- Release date: 1959
- Running time: 75 minutes
- Country: USSR
- Language: Russian

Morning star (Russian: Чолпон - утренняя звезда) is a 1959 Soviet ballet film directed by Roman Tikhomirov, based on a Kyrgyz folk tale by the same name, and featuring the Kyrgyz State Academic Opera and Ballet Theater.

== Synopsis ==
An evil witch, Ai Dai, uses magic to switch bodies with a beautiful young woman, Cholpon, and, with her new form, attempts to seduce the young prince Nurdin.

== Cast ==
- Reina Chokoyeva as Cholpon
- Uran Sarbagishev as Nurdin
- Nurdin Tugelov as Temir Khan
- Bubusara Beyshenalieva as Ai-Dai
- Sapar Abduzhalilov as Genie

== Reception ==
Upon the film's release in the United States in 1962, the New York Times wrote of it positively, saying:

“As a co-production of the Leningrad and Frunze Film Studios, the picture certainly moves [...]. The dancers go to town, and for once (on screen, anyway) a ballet heroine, Reina Chokoyeva, conveys real terror. But the incredibly mercurial Bibisara Beishenalieva, as the sorcerer, goes the whole company one better by suggesting that she's about to take off into space.”
