= The Mexican (short story) =

- Short story by Jack London
- Country: United States
- Language: English
- Genre: Short story

Publication
- Publication type: Magazine short story
- Publisher: Saturday Evening Post
- Publication date: 1911

"The Mexican" is a 1911 short story by American author Jack London.

== Background ==
Written during the Mexican Revolution, while London was in El Paso, Texas, "The Mexican" was first published in the Saturday Evening Post. In 1913, it was republished by Grosset & Dunlap in the collection of short stories The Night Born. The protagonist is based on the real-life "Joe Rivers", the pseudonym of a Mexican revolutionary whose boxing winnings supported the Junta Revolucionaria Mexicana, a group of revolutionaries-in-exile. Joe Rivers eventually retired from boxing and became an ice delivery person in El Paso.

== Plot summary ==
The story centers around Juan Fernandez, the son of a Mexican printer who had published articles favorable to striking workers in the hydraulic-power plants of Río Blanco, Veracruz. The workers were locked out, and federal troops were sent to kill them. Juan escaped the massacre by climbing over the bodies of the deceased, including those of his mother and father. He makes his way to El Paso, Texas, where he comes into contact with the Junta Revolucionaria Mexicana. Adopting the new name of Felipe Rivera, he volunteers to serve the cause at the office of the Junta, whose personnel suspect his motives and put him to work doing menial labor. Soon, however, he is dispatched to Baja California to reestablish connections between Los Angeles revolutionaries and the peninsula. Exceeding his orders, he assassinates a federal general and returns to El Paso.

Rivera surprises his colleagues by occasionally disappearing for days or weeks at a time, then returning with much-needed funds and displaying fresh injuries apparently caused by fighting. Unknown to them, he has begun working on the local boxing circuit, first as a sparring partner for experienced fighters and later moving up to compete in a few bouts of his own. As the Junta scrambles to finance the revolution, Rivera overhears his superiors discussing a shipment of guns needed by the front-line fighters. He suddenly tells them to order the guns and promises to get the $5,000 needed to pay for them within three weeks.

Rivera pays a visit to Michael Kelly, a boxing promoter who has brought the promising contender Danny Ward in from New York. Ward's scheduled opponent has broken his arm and is unable to fight; Rivera offers to take his place, insisting on a winner-take-all contract once he learns that the prize money will be more than enough to afford the guns. Ward agrees, but on the condition that the weigh-in must occur on the morning of the fight instead of at ringside.

Rivera holds his own against Ward and manages to knock him down several times, despite the crowd's dislike of Rivera and the referee's active intercession on Ward's behalf. During the fight, Rivera learns that Kelly has bet heavily against him and refuses to take a dive even after Kelly offers to help advance his boxing career. In the seventeenth round, spurred by visions of vengeance against his parents' killers, he knocks Ward out and wins the money needed to pay for the guns and to keep the revolution going.

== Adaptations ==
- filmed in 1952 as The Fighter starring Richard Conte and Lee J. Cobb
- filmed in 1955 in Soviet Union as The Mexican starring Oleg Strizhenov and Boris Andreyev
- TV movie "Der Mexikaner Felipe Rivera", filmed in GDR in 1984
