= White Nights (1959 film) =

- Russian: Белые ночи
- Directed by: Ivan Pyryev
- Written by: Fyodor Dostoevsky (novel); Ivan Pyryev
- Starring: Lyudmila Marchenko; Oleg Strizhenov; Anatoli Fedorinov; Svetlana Kharitonova; Yakov Belenkiy
- Cinematography: Valentin Pavlov
- Edited by: M. Renkova
- Production company: Mosfilm
- Release date: 1959
- Running time: 97 min.
- Country: Soviet Union
- Language: Russian

White Nights (Russian: Белые ночи, romanized: Belye nochi) is a 1959 Soviet drama film directed by Ivan Pyryev. The film is based on the short story of the same name by Fyodor Dostoevsky.

== Plot ==
The film takes place in St. Petersburg in the middle of the 19th century in the summer. The film tells about a lonely dreamer, who meets a girl named Nastenka, whom he immediately falls in love with. Every night they walk around the city together. It seems to the dreamer that he has found his soul mate, but another man appears in Nastenka's life...

== Cast ==
- Oleg Strizhenov as the dreamer[1]
- Lyudmila Marchenko as Nastenka
- Anatoli Fedorinov as Nastenka's fiancé
- Svetlana Kharitonova as Fyokla
- Yakov Belenkiy as duke
- Yevgeny Morgunov as guard
- Vera Popova as Praskovya Ivanovna
- Ariadna Shengelaya as slave in dance dreams
- Irina Skobtseva as duchess
- Iozas Udras as episode
- Sergei Troitsky as drunken merchant
- Galina Polskikh as episode at the ball (uncredited)
