= The Mexican (1955 film) =

1955 Soviet film by Vladimir Kaplunovsky

- Russian poster
- Russian: Мексиканец
- Directed by: Vladimir Kaplunovsky
- Written by: Emil Braginsky
- Based on: "The Mexican" by Jack London
- Starring: Oleg Strizhenov; Boris Andreyev; Nadezhda Rumyantseva
- Cinematography: Sergei Poluyanov
- Music by: Mikhail Chulaki
- Production company: Mosfilm
- Release date: 1955
- Running time: 89 minutes
- Country: Soviet Union
- Language: Russian

The Mexican (Russian: Мексиканец, romanized: Meksikanets) is a 1955 Soviet boxing drama film directed by Vladimir Kaplunovsky based on a 1911 short story by Jack London.

== Plot ==
During the early years of the Mexican Revolution, a group of Mexican rebels in Los Angeles work from a safe house, printing propaganda leaflets and gathering funds to support the Revolutionary Army in its fight to overthrow the regime of Porfirio Díaz. Letters from Mexico urgently request weapons, but the rebels struggle to raise sufficient money from the meager contributions of impoverished supporters.

Felipe Rivera, a young man who has recently crossed the Mexico–United States border, approaches the group, eager to join their cause. Initially suspicious, the rebels allow him to join only on the condition that he proves his loyalty to the revolution. Rivera, the son of slain patriot Joaquín Fernández, is determined to contribute meaningfully to their efforts.

Realizing the dire need for funds to arm the revolutionaries, Rivera volunteers to fight a renowned boxer, Danny Ward, to win the prize money. Despite the odds stacked against him, Rivera negotiates for the entire prize fund to go to the victor and steps into the ring to face the formidable champion. With the weight of the revolution on his shoulders, Rivera triumphs in the grueling match, securing the funds to aid his comrades in their struggle for freedom.

== Cast ==
- Oleg Strizhenov as Fernández / Felipe Rivera
- Boris Andreyev as Felipe Vera
- Daniil Sagal as Arellano
- Mark Petrovsky as Ramos
- Nadezhda Rumyantseva as May
- Vladimir Dorofeyev as Diego
- Tatiana Samoilova as María
- Lev Durasov as Unit Commander
- Mikhail Astangov as Kelly
- Georgi Slabinyak as Roberts
- Gennady Stepanov as Danny Ward

== See also ==
- The Fighter (1952 film)
