= Mikhail Raukhverger =

Russian pianist and composer (1901–1989)

Mikhail Rafailovich Raukhverger (Russian: Михаил Рафаилович Раухвергер; 5 December 1901 – 18 October 1989) was a Russian and Soviet pianist, composer and pedagogue.

== Career ==
Mikhail Raukhverger was born in Odessa in the Russian Empire (present-day Ukraine). He graduated from the Moscow Conservatory in 1927, studying under Felix Blumenfeld and Karl Kipp. He taught there from 1929 to 1941.

He then moved to the Kirghiz Soviet Socialist Republic, where he composed early Kyrgyz operas and ballets. He composed several operas and ballets, a symphony and a symphonic suite, a cello concerto, three string quartets, piano pieces, more than four hundred choral works and songs as well as drama and film scores.

He died in Moscow in 1989, aged 87.

== Awards and honors ==
- Order of the Red Banner of Labour (1958)
- People's Artist of the Kirghiz SSR (1961)
- Honored Art Worker of the RSFSR (1974)
- Order of Friendship of Peoples (1983)
- Order of the Red Star

== Film scores ==
- The Lonely White Sail (1937)
- For the Power of the Soviets (1956)
- Morning Star (1959)
