= Start Liquidation =

- Russian: Приступить к ликвидации
- Directed by: Boris Grigoryev
- Written by: Eduard Khrutsky
- Starring: Oleg Strizhenov; Mikhail Zhigalov; Vasily Lanovoy; Valeri Vojtyuk; Georgiy Yumatov
- Cinematography: Pyotr Katayev; Aleksandr Rybin
- Edited by: Yanina Bogolepova
- Music by: Georgy Dmitriev
- Release date: 1983
- Running time: 132 minute
- Country: Soviet Union
- Language: Russian

Start Liquidation (Russian: Приступить к ликвидации) is a 1983 Soviet crime action film directed by Boris Grigoryev.

== Plot ==
The film takes place in the spring of 1945 in Western Belarus, where the brutal gang of Boleslav Kruk creates chaos. They kill, rob and set fire to collective farm lands. They plan to get to Moscow. Lieutenant Colonel Ivan Danilov is trying to deal with them.

== Cast ==
- Oleg Strizhenov as Ivan Danilov
- Mikhail Zhigalov as Mikhail Nikitin
- Vasily Lanovoy as Vadim Chistyakov / Altunin
- Valeri Vojtyuk as Sergey Belov
- Georgiy Yumatov as Serebrovskiy
- Nadezhda Butyrtseva as Larisa Anatolievna
- Aleksandr Filippenko as Andrey Blinov 'Kopchyonyy'
- Olga Sirina as Zoya Litovskaya
- Vladimir Gusev as Valka-Krest
- Leonid Belozorovich as Tokmakov
