= Prince Igor (1969 film) =

- Directed by: Roman Tikhomirov
- Screenplay by: Isaac Glikman; Roman Tikhomirov
- Based on: Prince Igor
- Starring: Boris Khmelnitsky; Nellie Pshyonnaya; Boris Tokarev; Bimbolat Vatayev; Alexander Slastin
- Cinematography: Alexander Chirov
- Music by: Alexander Borodin
- Production company: Lenfilm
- Release date: 1969
- Running time: 115 minutes
- Country: USSR
- Language: Russian

Prince Igor (Russian: Князь Игорь, romanized: Knyaz Igor is a screen version of the eponymous opera by Alexander Borodin based on the epic poem "The Lay of Igor's Host". The film was directed by Roman Tikhomirov, and shot at the Lenfilm Studios in 1969.

== Synopsis ==
The film, which is set in the 12th century, follows Prince Igor's campaign against the Polovtsians.

== Reception ==
The New York Times noted that although "as a movie, “Prince Igor” naturally is not standard screen fare", "it entertainingly succeeds in avoiding the static, stagy look of many previously filmed operas."

The singing and the dancing were also praised. Harlow Robinson in the Opera Quarterly: "The vocal cast contains two real stars—Nesterenko (Khan Konchak) and Milashkina (Yaroslavna)—both of whom turn in soulful, resonant performances that shine through the less than ideal sound quality. That same high performance level is maintained by the rest of the cast. "
