= The Fighter (1952 film) =

1952 film by Herbert Kline

- Directed by: Herbert Kline
- Screenplay by: Aben Kandel; Herbert Kline
- Based on: The Mexican by Jack London
- Produced by: Alex Gottlieb
- Starring: Richard Conte; Vanessa Brown; Lee J. Cobb
- Cinematography: James Wong Howe
- Edited by: Edward Mann
- Music by: Vincente Gomez
- Production company: Alex Gottlieb Productions
- Distributed by: United Artists
- Release dates: May 1, 1952 (United Kingdom); May 29, 1952 (Philadelphia)
- Running time: 78 minutes
- Country: United States
- Language: English

The Fighter is a 1952 American film noir directed by Herbert Kline and starring Richard Conte, Vanessa Brown and Lee J. Cobb. The screenplay, written by Kline and Aben Kandel, was adapted from the 1911 short story "The Mexican" by Jack London.

== Plot ==
A Mexican boxer seeks to avenge the murder of his family by using his winnings to purchase weapons.

== Cast ==
- Richard Conte as Felipe Rivera
- Vanessa Brown as Kathy
- Lee J. Cobb as Durango
- Frank Silvera as Paulino
- Roberta Haynes as Nevis
- Hugh Sanders as Roberts
- Claire Carleton as Stella
- Martin Garralaga as Luis
- Argentina Brunetti as Maria
- Rodolfo Hoyos, Jr. as Alvarado
- Margaret Padilla as Elba
- Paul Fierro as Fierro
- Rico Alaniz as Carlos
- Paul Marion as Rivas
- Robert Wells as Tex

== Production ==
Filming began in late December 1951 and wrapped by mid-January 1952.

== Release ==
The film was first released in the United Kingdom on May 1, 1952. Its world premiere was held in Philadelphia on May 29, 1952.

== Reception ==
In a contemporary review for The New York Times, critic Howard Thompson wrote that The Fighter "is one of those disturbing misfires, an altogether respectable film that seldom realizes its potentialities."

In The Philadelphia Inquirer, critic Mildred Martin called the film "muddled and uncertain in its dramatic drive".

== See also ==
- List of boxing films
- The Mexican (1955 film)
