= Ajooba =

1990 superhero film

Ajooba Черный принц Аджуба
- Indian Theatrical release poster
- Directed by: Shashi Kapoor; Russian film director Gennady Vasilyev
- Written by: Prayag Raj; Brij Katyal; Bharat B. Bhalla; Russian screenwriter Yu Avetikov; Valentin Ezhov
- Produced by: Shashi Kapoor
- Starring: Amitabh Bachchan; Dimple Kapadia; Rishi Kapoor; Sonam; Shammi Kapoor; Dara Singh; Amrish Puri; Saeed Jaffery
- Cinematography: Sergei Anufriyev; Aleksandr Kovalchuk; Peter Pereira
- Edited by: Bhanudas Divakar; Tatyana Malyavina
- Music by: Songs: Laxmikant–Pyarelal; Score: Vanraj Bhatia
- Production companies: Aasia Films Pvt. Ltd. Gorky Film Studio
- Release dates: July 1990 (Soviet Union); 12 April 1991 (India)
- Running time: 170 minutes
- Countries: India; Soviet Union
- Languages: Hindi; Russian

Ajooba (transl. 'Wonder') is a 1990 superhero film, produced and directed by Shashi Kapoor and co-directed by Soviet filmmaker Gennadi Vasilyev. An Indian-Soviet co-production, it is loosely based on Arabic folklore such as One Thousand and One Nights. The film had a Russian language version released in the Soviet Union, Черный принц Аджуба ('Black Prince Ajuba'), in 1990, before its Indian release in 1991. The film starred Amitabh Bachchan as the titular superhero Ajooba, along with Rishi Kapoor, Dimple Kapadia, Sonam, Shammi Kapoor, Dara Singh, Amrish Puri and Saeed Jaffery in pivotal roles. Made on a budget of ₹8 crore, it was the most expensive Indian film made until then.

Ajooba released worldwide on 12 April 1991, on the Eid weekend. It received mixed reviews from critics, who praised the performances, special effects and music, but criticised the story, screenplay and direction.

== Plot ==
The Afghan kingdom of Baharistan is ruled by a kind Sultan (Shammi Kapoor). All is well in the land, except that Sultan seemingly can't have any child. An evil devil-worshipping Vazir (Amrish Puri) seeks to usurp the throne, reviving his "Fauladi Shaitan" (a huge demon-like figure made of stone) and take over the world. Vazir instructs his maids to strangle every child born to Sultan. Finally, however, a spark of divine intervention (presented literally as a spark which descends from the heavens and enters the womb) renders the next newborn son immune to the poisons and strangulations administered by the maids. This Shehzada (Prince), named as Ali (Amitabh Bachchan), eventually becomes Ajooba (Miracle).

Sultan and his wife Malika (Ariadna Shengelaya) kick off celebrations throughout the land. The good court magician Ameer Khan (Saeed Jaffrey), fondly called "Ameer Baba", the very much close friend of Sultan, recently returned from his travels to Hind (India), presents a magic sword to Sultan. Sultan thrusts it into a pillar (verifying its keenness) and Ameer Baba pronounces that it may be drawn out of the stone again only by a member of the royal family (rather like the Excalibur).

Soon after, Sultan privately discusses about the traitors in the kingdom, with Ameer Baba. Vazir overhears their discussion, eventually tricks Ameer Baba, steals his Necklace of Immortality, throws him into the dungeon, attempts to murder Sultan and his family and take over the throne. Sultan escapes with his wife and child. After a pitched battle involving magic carpets, storms and ships, Sultan is missing. Malika is blinded and the young Shehzada is washed ashore by a dolphin (whom he eventually thinks of as his mother) to a blacksmith. This blacksmith adopts the kid, trains him in all the worldly and martial arts and thus creates Ajooba. In the meantime, Vazir blames Ameer Baba for Sultan's murder, takes over the throne and begins ravaging the land, always uttering his slogan Shaitan Zindabad (Long live the Devil).

Ajooba is a masked rider in black (rather like Zorro) who thwarts Vazir's lackeys as they pillage the lands and harass the citizens. His plain self is Ali, an ordinary restaurateur and his chum is Hassan (Rishi Kapoor). Together they foil Vazir's evil schemes, raid his caravans and woo their girls. Ali falls for Rukhsana (Dimple Kapadia), the daughter of Ameer Baba, returned from Hind (to rescue her imprisoned father), while Hassan's affections are for Vazir's Shehzadi Henna (Sonam).

Ajooba inflicts constant pain upon Vazir. Vazir eventually raises his Fauladi Shaitan and plans an all-out attack. The King of Hind, Karan Singh (Dara Singh) brings his forces to aid Ajooba. The resulting war brings all the central characters together.

Several questions are essentially resolved in the ensuing war. The climax is a panorama of demons, magical horses and donkeys, a full-scale combat between Vazir's army and the Hind army, enchanted swords and a final revelation about the true identity of Ajooba.

== Cast ==
- Amitabh Bachchan as Shehzada Ali / Ajooba
- Dimple Kapadia as Rukhsana Khan
- Rishi Kapoor as Hassan
- Sonam as Shehzadi Henna
- Shammi Kapoor as Sultan / Peer Baba
- Dara Singh as Maharaja Karan Singh
- Amrish Puri as Vazir
- Saeed Jaffrey as Magician Ameer Khan / Baba
- Sushma Seth as Zarina Khan
- Ariadna Shengelaya as Malika
- Tej Sapru as Prince Udham Singh
- Tinu Anand as Anwar Khan
- Dalip Tahil as Shah Rukh
- Georgi Darchiashvili as Altaf
- Narendranath as Sharafat Khan
- Mac Mohan as Bandit
- Sudhir as Bandit
- Yunus Parvez as Bandit
- C. S. Dubey as Bandit
- Praveen Kumar Sobti as Vazir's Soldier
- Manik Irani as Vazir's Soldier
- Bob Christo as Vazir's Soldier

== Production ==
The film was made in the wake of the success of two previous Indo-Soviet collaborated films, Alibaba aur 40 Chor and Sohni Mahiwal.

== Soundtrack ==
| # | Title | Singer(s) |
|---|---|---|
| 1 | "Are Tajub Hai" | Mohammad Aziz, Sudesh Bhosle |
| 2 | "Chukdum Chukdum" | Mohammad Aziz |
| 3 | "Ek Najoomi Se Poocha" | Kavita Krishnamurthy |
| 4 | "Main Matti Ka Gudda Tu Sone Ki Gudiya" | Mohammad Aziz, Alka Yagnik |
| 5 | "Oh Mera Jaan-E-Bahar Aa Gaya" | Mohammad Aziz, Sudesh Bhosle, Alka Yagnik, Anuradha Paudwal |
| 6 | "Ya Ali Ya Ali" | Sudesh Bhosle |

== Box office ==
In India, the film did not performed well at the box office.

One the other hand, the film was a relatively successful in the Soviet Union, where it was released as Черный принц Аджуба (Black Prince Ajuba) in July 1990. The overall failure of the movie resulted it being the last collaboration between the Indian and Soviet film industries. However, over the time the film has gained cult classic status with multiple re-runs over cable television on public demand.

== See also ==
- List of Indian superhero films
