= James E. Falen =

James E. Falen (April 6, 1935 – June 2, 2026) was a professor emeritus of Russian at the University of Tennessee. He is widely recognized as one of the best translators of Russian literature, specifically celebrated for his landmark verse translation of Alexander Pushkin’s masterpieces. He published a translation of Eugene Onegin by Alexander Pushkin in 1990 which was also influenced by Nabokov's translation, but preserved the Onegin stanzas (ISBN 0809316307). This translation is considered to be the most faithful one to Pushkin's spirit according to Russian critics and translators.

His other books include:

- Isaac Babel, Russian master of the short story (1974), a comprehensive study of the life and work of Isaak Babel (1894–1940).
- Boris Godunov and other dramatic works (2007), a translation of plays by Alexander Pushkin (1799–1837).
- Selected Lyrical Poetry (2009), translation of some more poetry of Pushkin.
- Intimations: Selected Poetry by Anna Akhmatova (2010), a translation of selected poems of Anna Akhmatova (1889–1966).
- My Sister Life and The Zhivago Poems, (2012), a translation of two poetry anthologies by Boris Pasternak (1890-1960).
