= Roman Tikhomirov =

- Born: July 7, 1915; Saratov, Russian Empire
- Died: August 4, 1984 (age 69)
- Occupations: Director, screenwriter
- Years active: 1930-1984
- Awards: People’s Artist of the RSFSR

Roman Irinarkhovich Tikhomirov (Russian: Роман Иринархович Тихомиров) (1915-1984) was a Soviet film director and screenwriter. In 1973, he was awarded the title of People’s Artist of the RSFSR.

== Biography ==
Roman Tikhomirov was born in 1915 in Saratov.

As a young man, he entered the Saint Petersburg State Conservatory (violin class), and graduated from it in 1941. He then continued his studies, and, in 1945, he graduated from the conductor class of the same conservatory. In parallel with his studies at the Conservatory, he worked as an assistant director on Sergei Gerasimov’s The New Teacher, Ya. Protazanov’s Nasreddin in Bukhara, and Mikhail Romm’s Man No. 217.

His first opera production was the play “The Wolf and the Seven Little Kids” by M. Koval (Conservatory Opera Studio). Starting in 1948, he was Head of the Department of Musical Theaters and Director of the All-Union House of Folk Art named at the Committee on Arts of the USSR. In 1951 he made his debut on the professional stage at the Saratov Opera and Ballet Theater (“May Night” by N. A. Rimsky-Korsakov). In 1952–1956, he was the chief director of the Novosibirsk Opera and Ballet Theater. In 1957-1959 he was the artistic director of the Central Television. In 1958, his first film as a director and screenwriter, Eugene Onegin, was released. Starting in 1960, he was the chairman of the artistic council of the creative association of television films attached to Mosfilm film studio. In 1958–1962, he was a director at Lenfilm. In 1962–1977, he was the chief director of the Leningrad Kirov Opera and Ballet Theater.

== Selected filmography ==
- 1958 — Eugene Onegin
- 1959 — Morning Star
- 1960 — The Queen of Spades
- 1963 — The Serf Actress
- 1965 — When the Song Does Not End
- 1969 — Prince Igor
