= Tash-Döbö =

Tash-Döbö Таш-Дөбө Vorontsovka
- Location within Kyrgyzstan
- Coordinates: 42°43′20″N 74°34′20″E
- Country: Kyrgyzstan
- Region: Chüy
- District: Alamüdün

Population (2021)
  - Total: 5,649
- Time zone: UTC+6

Tash-Döbö (Kyrgyz: Таш-Дөбө, formerly: Воронцовка Vorontsovka) is a village in Chüy Region of Kyrgyzstan. It is part of the Alamüdün District. Its population was 5,649 in 2021.

== Population ==
Historical population
Year	Pop.	±% p.a.
2009	6,381	—
2021	5,649	−1.01%
Note: resident population; Sources:
