= The Queen of Spades (1960 film) =

- Directed by: Roman Tikhomirov
- Written by: Aleksandr Pushkin; Roman Tikhomirov
- Starring: Oleg Strizhenov
- Cinematography: Yevgeni Shapiro
- Music by: Pyotr Ilyich Tchaikovsky
- Distributed by: Lenfilm
- Release date: 1960
- Running time: 106 min.
- Country: Soviet Union
- Language: Russian

The Queen of Spades (Russian: «Пиковая дама», romanized: Pikovaya dama) is a 1960 film adaptation of Tchaikovsky's opera The Queen of Spades, based on the 1834 Aleksandr Pushkin short story of the same name, and directed by Roman Tikhomirov.

The film, set in the 1820s, follows a man named Hermann, who has just returned from army service to Moscow. At the beginning of the film, he is in love with the beautiful young Liza - who is engaged to another - but soon he becomes fatally obsessed with learning the secret to a winning card combination from Liza's grandmother, the Countess.

The operatic singing was performed by Zurab Andzhaparidze, Tamara Milashkina, and Yevgeny Kibkalo.

For this film Oleg Strizhenov received the Aleksandr Pushkin's Big Gold Medal and the prize of the Russian Musical Fund of Irina Arkhipova "for the brilliant realization of the figure of Hermann in the film Queen of Spades".

== Plot ==
The story, based on Alexander Pushkin’s novella, revolves around Hermann, a young and ambitious engineer whose obsessive drive to achieve wealth leads to his tragic downfall. Hermann is a man of discipline, avoiding the distractions of aristocratic life such as drinking and gambling, yet he is consumed by an insatiable desire for fortune. His life takes a dramatic turn when he hears a legend about an elderly countess who possesses the secret of three winning cards that guarantee success at the gambling table. His intrigue deepens when he learns that the countess’s granddaughter, Lisa, is the woman he has secretly admired. Despite her engagement to Prince Yeletsky, Hermann uses his growing affection for Lisa as a way to access the countess, intent on uncovering her secret no matter the cost.

Hermann manipulates Lisa into giving him the keys to the countess's chambers, where he confronts the old woman late at night. He begs, threatens, and ultimately terrifies her into silence, causing her to die of a heart attack without revealing the coveted secret. Wracked with guilt and driven to madness, Hermann later sees the ghost of the countess, who reveals the winning cards—three, seven, and ace—sealing his obsession with gambling as his path to wealth. Meanwhile, Lisa, realizing that Hermann’s love was only a tool for his schemes, is devastated by her grandmother’s death and Hermann’s cold indifference. Heartbroken and overcome by despair, she takes her own life, drowning herself in a canal. Hermann, now entirely consumed by his fixation, descends further into madness, preparing for what he believes will be his ultimate triumph.

Arriving at a gambling house, Hermann stakes everything on the cards revealed by the ghost. He wins on the three and the seven, but his third and final card—what he believes to be the ace—turns out to be the Queen of Spades, a cruel and mocking reminder of the countess’s power even in death. Devastated and ruined, Hermann loses his entire fortune. Haunted by hallucinations of the countess and Lisa, he succumbs to his despair and takes his own life. In his final moments, Hermann begs for Lisa’s forgiveness, but it is too late, as his obsession has led to his destruction and hers.

== Cast ==
- Hermann - Oleg Strizhenov
- Lisa - Olga Krasina
- Countess - Yelena Polevitskaya
- Count Tomsky - Vadim Medvedev
- Yeletsky - Valentin Kulik

== See also ==
- The Queen of Spades (opera)
- The Queen of Spades (1916 film)
- The Queen of Spades (1970 film)
- The Queen of Spades (1982 film)
