= Eugene Onegin (1959 film) =

Евгений Онегин Eugene Onegin
- Directed by: Roman Tikhomirov
- Screenplay by: Alexander Pushkin (novel in verse); Konstantin Shilovsky (libretto); Alexander Ivanovsky; Roman Tikhomirov
- Starring: Vadim Medvedev; Igor Ozerov; Ariadna Shengelaya
- Music by: Pyotr Tchaikovsky
- Production company: Lenfilm Studio
- Release dates: 8 March 1959 (USSR); 13 September 1959 (U.S.)
- Running time: 108 minutes
- Country: Soviet Union
- Language: Russian

Eugene Onegin (Russian: Евгений Онегин, romanized: Yevgeni Onegin) is 1959 Soviet opera film, produced by Lenfilm Studio, directed by Roman Tikhomirov, starring Vadim Medvedev, Igor Ozerov and Ariadna Shengelaya. The film is a screen version of the famous 1879 opera Eugene Onegin by Pyotr Tchaikovsky based on the 1825-1832 novel in verse by Alexander Pushkin.

The principal solo parts were performed by notable opera singers of the Bolshoi Theatre. Musical manager and conductor – Boris Khaykin.

== Cast ==
- Vadim Medvedev – Eugene Onegin (sung by Yevgeny Kibkalo)
- Igor Ozerov – Vladimir Lensky (sung by Anton Alexeyevitch Grigoryev)
- Ariadna Shengelaya – Tatyana Larina (sung by Galina Vishnevskaya)
- Svetlana Nemolyayeva – Olga Larina (sung by Larisa Avdeyeva)

== Plot ==
Eugene Onegin, a jaded young dandy from the big city of St. Petersburg, travels to the country to ingratiate himself into the affection of a dying uncle. There he meets the idealistic and romantic poet Vladimir Lensky, who introduces him to the daughters of a local landowner: Olga, with whom Lensky has strong affections, and Olga's younger sister Tatyana. Tatyana falls in love with Onegin. She writes him a letter pledging her love to him and telling him that she "is his." But Onegin rejects her in a polite, but cold and condescending sermon. Instead, angered by Lensky's dragging him to Tatyana's nameday party, he asks Olga to dance and flirts with her, much to Lensky's displeasure. Lensky challenges his friend to a duel with pistols. Seconds are appointed and, opportunities for reconciliation scorned, the duel takes place. Onegin kills Lensky and leaves the country estates to take a distant military assignment. Tatyana has disturbed dreams of Onegin and visits his uncle's estate to scan the books that he was reading so as to judge his character.

Several years pass, and the scene changes to St. Petersburg, to which Onegin has come to attend the most prominent balls and interact with the leaders of old Russian society. He sees the most beautiful woman, who now captures the attention of all and is central to society's whirl, and realizes that it is that same Tatyana whose love he had once turned away. Now she is married to an aged general. At first Tatyana pretends that she does not recognize the now mature Onegin, but then treats him with politeness, but coolly. But he writes to her passionately now and asks to see her in private, away from her husband, with whom he briefly speaks. At last he contrives to stand in her presence away from others eyes and presents to her the opportunity to renew their past love. But she rejects him in a speech, mirroring his earlier sermon, where she admits both: her love for him and the absolute loyalty that she nevertheless has for her husband.

== Reception ==
At the time, The Musical Times noted that, "Visually, there was the splendid advantage of a cast of young and handsome actors in the four principal roles, and in the minor ones too there were some beautiful Russian faces. While the modern opera-stage generally offers a reasonably personable Tatiana, a long line of portly tenors and baritones have made us forget that Lensky and Onegin should also be romantic figures, as they are here in the persons of Igor Ozerov and Vadim Medvedev, while Ariadna Shengelaya [...] brought a virginal Slavonic charm to Tatiana that the most glamorous prima donna could hardly be expected to rival."

== Awards ==
- The II All-Union Film Festival (1959) – 1st Prize to A. Shengelaya, 2nd Prize to Y. Shapiro, 1st Prize to G. Elbert.
- The XIII Edinburgh International Film Festival (1960) – diploma for the film.
