= Oleg Strizhenov =

Soviet and Russian actor (1929–2025)

- Олег Стриженов
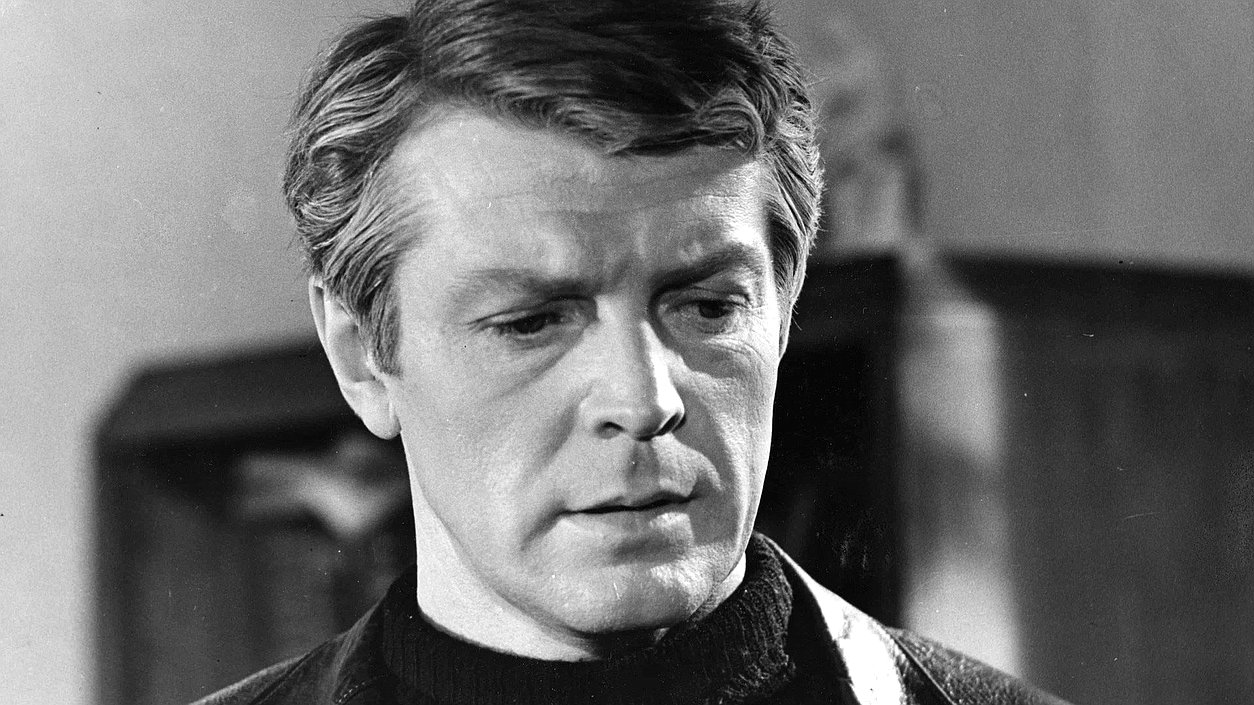
- Born: 10 August 1929; Blagoveshchensk, Far Eastern Krai, Russian SFSR, USSR
- Died: 9 February 2025 (aged 95); Moscow, Russia

Oleg Aleksandrovich Strizhenov (Russian: Олег Александрович Стриженов; 10 August 1929 – 9 February 2025) was a Soviet and Russian stage and film actor. He was awarded People's Artist of the USSR in 1988.

== Biography ==
Strizhenov was born in Blagoveshchensk in 1929. His family moved to Moscow in 1935, where he grew up. He completed the Boris Shchukin Theatre Institute (Shchuka, The Pike, as it is informally known) in 1953 and from 1953 he was actor in the Russian Theater of Drama in Tallinn (in Estonia); from 1954 to 1955, he acted at the Pushkin Theater in Leningrad, and in 1957 he was at the Screen Actors Theater and Studio in Moscow. From 1966 to 1976 he acted at the Moscow Artists' and Actors' Theater.

== Career ==
Strizhenov became popular after playing the title character, revolutionary Arthur in The Gadfly, based on the novel by Ethel Lilian Voynich. He also starred in films The Mexican, as Fernandez/Felipe Rivera, The Forty-First, as Lieutenant Nikolaevich Govorukha-Otrok, Pardesi, as Afanasy Nikitin, The Captain's Daughter, as Pyotr Grinyov, White Nights, as the dreamer, and The Queen of Spades, as Hermann.

== Personal life ==
Strizhenov was married three times; all of his wives were actresses. His first marriage was to his The Gadfly co-star, Marianna (1924-2004). They were married since 1955 and until 1968. Their daughter, Natalya, died in 2003. They divorced in 1968. Strizhenov married his second wife, actress Lyubov Zemlyanikina (1940-2024), in 1968. The marriage lasted six years. Their child is Russian actor, writer, producer, and director Aleksandr Strizhenov (husband of actress Yekaterina Strizhenova). He married his third wife, Lionella Skirda (born 1938), in 1976. Strizhenov's older brother, Gleb, was also an actor. He was an Honored Artist of the RSFSR and starred with his brother in two films.

Strizhenov died at a Moscow hospital on 9 February 2025, at the age of 95. He was survived by his wife.

== Awards ==
- Medal "For Valiant Labour in the Great Patriotic War 1941–1945" (1945)
- Honored Artist of the RSFSR (1964)
- People's Artist of the RSFSR (1969)
- People's Artist of the USSR (1988)
- Order "For Merit to the Fatherland";
  - 3rd class (30 July 1999) – For outstanding contribution to the development of national cinema'
  - 2nd class (19 October 2004) – For outstanding achievements in the field of cinema and many years of creative activity
- Golden Eagle Award (2010)
- Jubilee Medal "In Commemoration of the 100th Anniversary of the Birth of Vladimir Ilyich Lenin"
- Jubilee Medal "Thirty Years of Victory in the Great Patriotic War 1941–1945"
- Jubilee Medal "Forty Years of Victory in the Great Patriotic War 1941–1945"
- Jubilee Medal "50 Years of Victory in the Great Patriotic War 1941–1945"
- Jubilee Medal "60 Years of Victory in the Great Patriotic War 1941–1945"
- Jubilee Medal "65 Years of Victory in the Great Patriotic War 1941–1945"
- Jubilee Medal "70 Years of Victory in the Great Patriotic War 1941–1945"
- Medal "Veteran of Labour"
- Medal "In Commemoration of the 800th Anniversary of Moscow"
- Medal "In Commemoration of the 850th Anniversary of Moscow"

== Selected filmography ==
- The Gadfly (1955)
- The Mexican (1955)
- The Forty-First (1956)
- Pardesi (1957)
- The Captain's Daughter (1958)
- White Nights (1959)
- The Queen of Spades (1960)
- Northern Story (1960)
- Optimistic Tragedy (1963)
- Roll Call (1965)
- Not Under the Jurisdiction (1969)
- The Star of Captivating Happiness (1975)
- The Youth of Peter the Great
- Start Liquidation (1983)
