= Georgy Firtich =

Russian composer

Firtich in 2016

Georgy Ivanovich Firtich (Russian: Георгий Иванович Фиртич; 20 October 1938 – 27 January 2016) was a Soviet and Russian composer, jazz pianist, professor Herzen University. Honored Art Worker the Russian Federation.

Born in Pskov. He graduated from the School of Music by Rimsky-Korsakov (class composition) and Saint Petersburg Conservatory (1962, class of Yuri Balkashin and Boris Arapov).

During his studies, he began performing as a pianist: school years with the performance of the classics and his own compositions, the school - as a jazz singer. At the undergraduate conservatory began writing for film (in this area has worked for almost 40 years). In 1962 he joined the Union Composers of USSR. Since 1994, led by ACM (Association for Contemporary Music), the Union of Composers of St. Petersburg. He died on 27 January 2016 in St. Petersburg.
