= Dance in Kyrgyzstan =

Traditional and performative dance

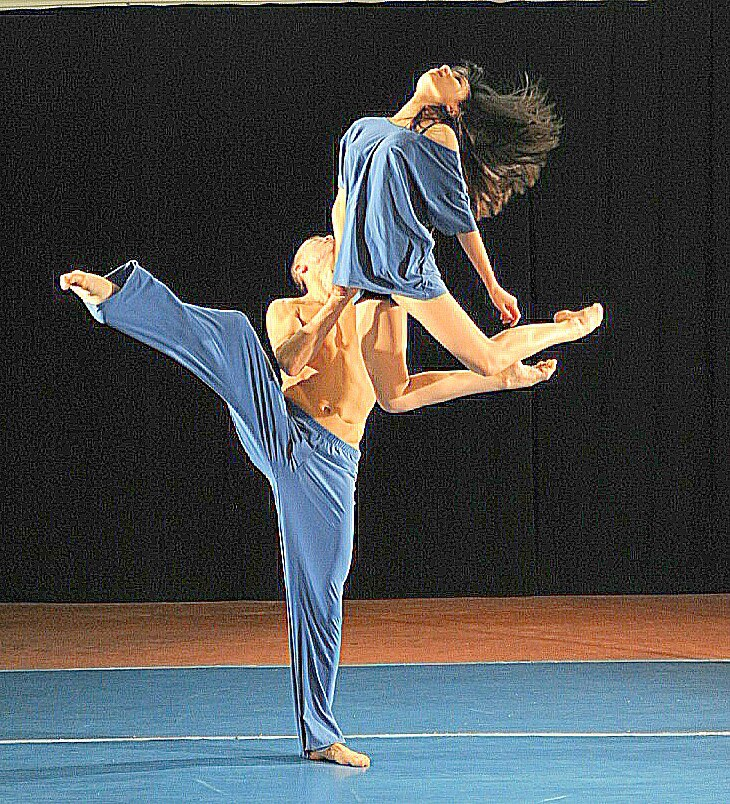
Kyrgyz theatrical dancers

Dance in Kyrgyzstan includes reconstructed traditional dances and modern theatrical dance. No descriptions of traditional dances exist; all of the modern folk dances are created after the establishment of the Soviet rule in Central Asia. Theatrical dance flourished during the 20th century with many innovative ballet performances and choreographed dancing in opera.

== Traditional dance ==
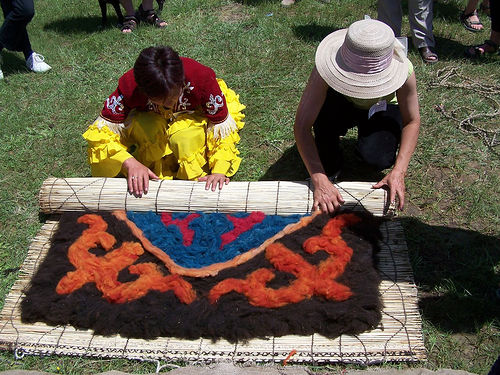
Ala-kiyiz in making

The earliest mentions of Kyrgyz dance are found in the Epic of Manas, however, no descriptions of traditional dance survived. It is theorised that the dance mentioned in Manas might be close to the Mongol Biyelgee and that hand movements were the most prominent element of the traditional dance. Russian travelers also include several passing mentions of Kyrgyz people entertaining themselves with dancing, but provide no details. Dance movements are incorporated in the performances of komuz players, kuuduldar jesters (Kyrgyz: куудулдар) and in some games. The reason why Kyrgyz dance did not survive is not clear, but might have been hard to preserve due to the nomadic lifestyle of the pre-modern Kyrgyz.

A renewed interest in traditional dance emerged in the 1930s, under the Soviet rule; the choreographers often used folk games and crafts as a source of inspiration. For example, the kijiz women's dance (Kyrgyz: кийиз) includes felting movements for making ala kiyiz.

The permanent national theatrical folk dance company was established in 1966 led by Melisbek Asylbashev.

== Theatrical dance ==
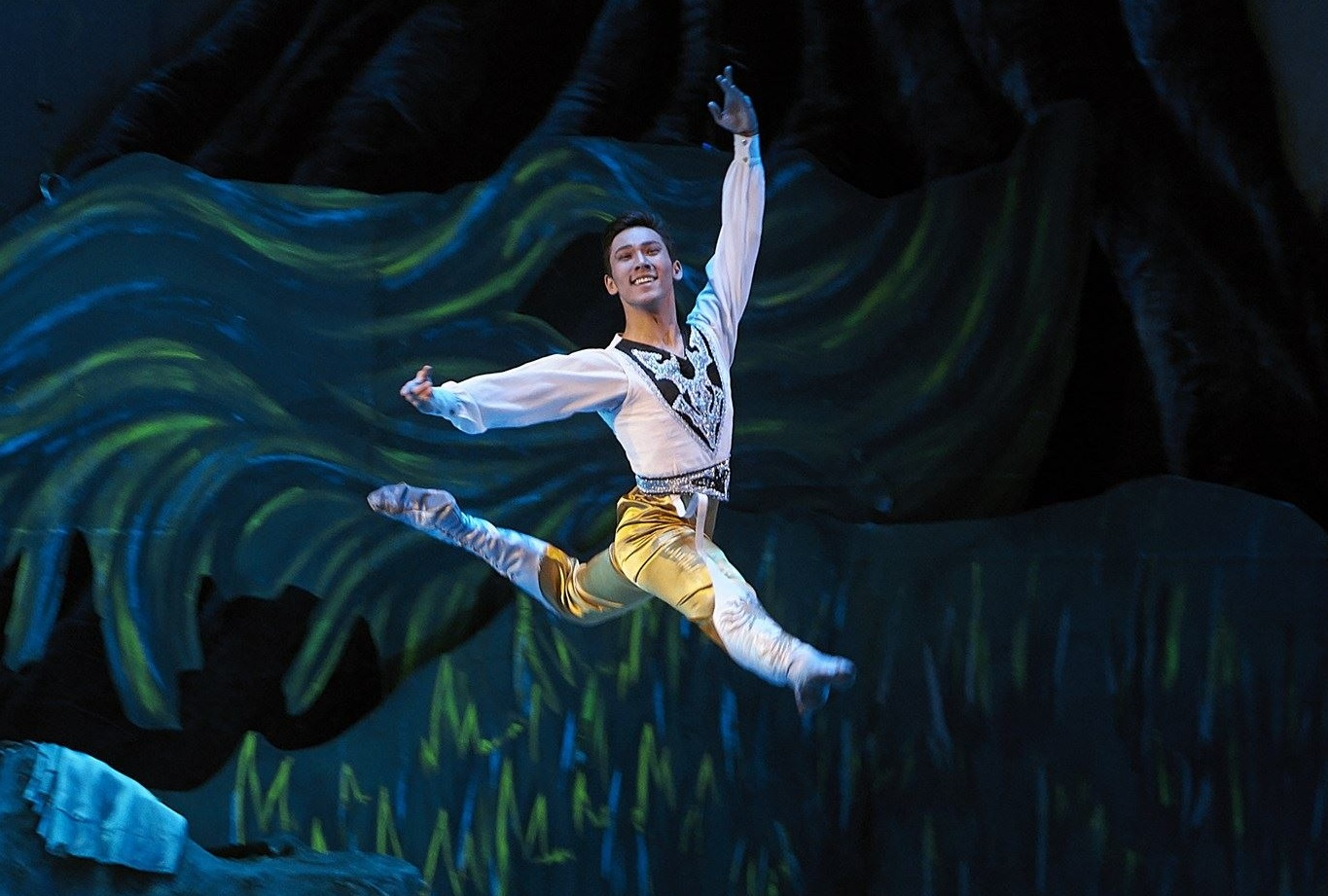
"Cholpon" ballet

The Frunze Opera and Ballet Theater, the first Kyrgyz academic dance studio, was established in Bishkek in 1926 as a music and drama studio. In 1936, the studio was renamed to a music and drama theatre; Nikolai Kholfin, the head of its ballet company, created dance parties for numerous plays and operas such as Altyn Kyz, Ajchurek, Azhal Orduna, the first Kyrgyz ballet Anar and others.

Other important ballets are Cholpon (Kyrgyz: Чолпон, 1944) choreographed by Lev Kramarevsky, the first comedic ballet Kujruchuk (Kyrgyz: Куйручук, 1960) choreographed by Nurdin Tùgôlov.

In late 1960s, the main theme of Kyrgyz ballet shifted to stories about bravery and heroism, such as the new productions of Spartacus and Emin Aristakesyan's Prometheus, Uran Sarbagishev's Ôlbôstùk (Kyrgyz: Өлбөстүк) and others. Kyrgyz writer Chinghiz Aitmatov's works became inspirations for several ballets such as Samanchynyn zholu (Kyrgyz: Саманчынын жолу). The principal ballet dancers of Kyrgyzstan are Aisulu Tokombayeva, Cholponbek Bazarbayev, Ùrstanbek Irsaliev, Svetlana Tùkbulatova, Rosa Tairova, Anvarbek Ryskulov, Makhmud Esambayev, Kemel Suleimanov and Bolot Kuttubayev.

The National school of ballet was founded in 1980; Aidai Shukurbekova (Kyrgyz: Шүкүрбекова Айдай) served as its first director.
