= Apple IMC =

Distributors for Apple Computer products

An Apple independent marketing company (IMC) is a discontinued name for an independent company authorised to be a distributor for the computer manufacturer Apple Computer Inc. Apple Computer marketing manager Brian Seligmann described IMCs as "super distributors" appointed in "marginal territories where the revenue doesn’t warrant a full subsidiary office".

== List ==
A number of countries have an Apple IMC including Poland, Romania, Russia, South Africa, Turkey and UAE.

- Czechoslovakia: Technicke a Informacni Sluzby
- Middle East: Arab Business Machines (and its subsidiary Apple IMC East)
- Portugal: Interlog
- Russia: RUIap, Apple IMC Russia
- "Former Soviet Union region": Intermicro
- South Africa: Core Computer Business
