= Ariadna Shengelaya =

Soviet actress

- Born: 13 January 1937 (age 89); Tashkent, Soviet Union
- Education: All-Union State Institute of Cinematography (1960)
- Occupation: Actress
- Years active: 1957-2002
- Notable work: Garnet Bracelet (1960) Eugene Onegin (1958) Tatyana Larina
- Spouse: Eldar Shengelaya (m. 1958–1980) Divorced

Ariadna Vsevolodovna Shengelaya (née Shprink) (Russian: Ариа́дна Все́володовна Шенгела́я; born 13 January 1937) is a Soviet actress. She appeared in 33 films between 1957 and 1997. She was married to the Georgian film director Eldar Shengelaya from 1957 to 1980.

The actress of opulent beauty, Ariadna Shprink-Shengelaya, portrayed the best aristocratic figures in classical Russian literature. In particular, Tatyana Larina from the 1958 film Onegin, Eugénie Grandet from the 1960 film "Eugénie Grandet", and duchess Mary from the film "Shot" (1966). Numerous filmmakers were drawn to the actress because of her beauty. She was one of the most well-liked actresses in Soviet cinema in the late 1950s and early 1960s. Her best performances as princesses, countesses, and duchesses were completely displayed by the actress's lyrical brilliance and exceptional poetic charm.

== Early life and education ==
Ariadna Shengelaya (née Shprink), a Soviet and Russian theatre and film actress, was born in Tashkent on January 13, 1937. Her father, Vsevolod E. Schprink, was a scientist, economist, and translator, who spent a significant amount of time in Stalin's labor camps (1900–1965). Ariadna completed her studies at the V. Belokurov acting workshop at the All-Union State Institute of Cinematography in 1960.

== Career ==
In 1957, Ariadna made her acting debut in the feature film Ekaterina Voronina as Irina. Shengelaya appeared in two movies while still a student at the Institute of Cinematography: Eugene Onegin (Tatyana Larina) and Eugenia Grande (Eugene). She was one of the most well-liked actresses in Soviet cinema in the late 1950s and early 1960s. Her delicate aristocratic beauty and her old Greek name, Ariadne, were remembered by the audience. Of course, the actress' oriental beauty caught the directors' attention.

She was initially given the part of a young woman who had just started living alone, who knew how to accept responsibility for her acts and faults, who had a strong will, and who knew how to accomplish her goals while realizing that not all methods were appropriate. Then, like beads on a string, intriguing works started to be strung by directors like Ivan Pyriev ("White Nights"), Georgy Danelia ("Don't Cry!"), Nadezhda Kosheverova ("Caution, Grandma!"), Felix Mironer ("Leaving"), Isidor Annensky ("Talents and Admirers," "Ekaterina Voronina"), Abram Room ("Garnet Bracelet"), Naum Trakhtenberg (“Shot”), Eldar Shengelaya (“Freaks”) and many others.

She played the roles of Anne Frank in "Anne Frank's Diary" by E. Goodrich and A. Heckett and Cleopatra in "Caesar and Cleopatra" by Bernard Shaw, so the theatrical world was not foreign to her.

== Family ==
Ariadna joined the illustrious family of Georgian filmmakers marrying Eldar Shengelaya and changed her last name from Shprink to Shengelaya. Her mother-in-law Nato Vachnadze, an actress, was one of the biggest names in Georgian cinema, and her father-in-law Nikolai Shengelaya was a well-known film director. Tragically, Nato perished in an airplane disaster. Eldar and Georgy, two of Nikolai and Nato's kids, also achieved success as filmmakers and won numerous significant international accolades. Eldar wed Ariadna Shprink, while Georgy wed the well-known actress Sofiko Chiaureli. Two daughters were born to Ariadna and Eldar: Nato Shengelaya, an actress, and Ekaterina Shengelaya (b. 1967).

== Acting in Indian cinema ==
Ariadna Shengelaya played the role of the Queen Mother in the 1991 released Indian movie Ajooba starring Amitabh Bachchan as the Prince of the Kingdom of Baharistan. This film was an Indo-Soviet venture dubbed and released in the Russian language as Ajooba (Russian: Возвращение багдадского вора: Возвращение багдадского вора) – produced and directed by Shashi Kapoor and also co-directed by the Soviet filmmaker Gennadi Vasilyev.

== Awards ==
For the movie "Evgeny Onegin," Ariadna won the II All-Union Film Festival's "Award for the actors" category in 1959. For her performance in "Garnet Bracelet," she was selected Best Actress in a 1965 poll by the publication "Soviet Screen." Shengelaya was designated a People's Artist of Russia and the Georgian SSR in 1979, respectively (2000).

== Filmography ==
- Furtuna (1959) as Zana
- Eugene Onegin (1958) as Tatyana Larina
- The White Caravan (1963) as Maria
- Don't Grieve (1969) as countess
- Dreams of Love – Liszt (1970) as Carolyne zu Sayn-Wittgenstein
- Goya or the Hard Way to Enlightenment (1971) as Josefa
- Ajooba (1991) as Malika, Sultan's wife
