= Lenfilm =

Russian production company and film studio

Kinostudiya LenFilm
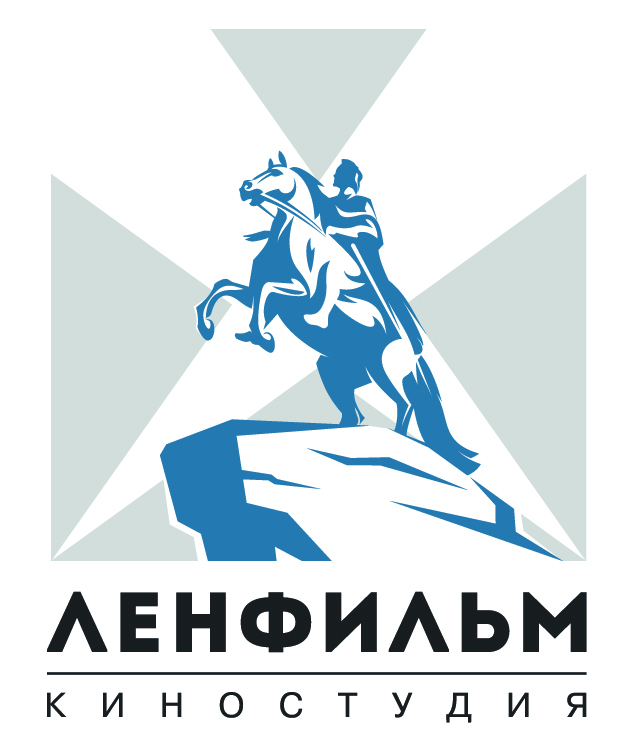

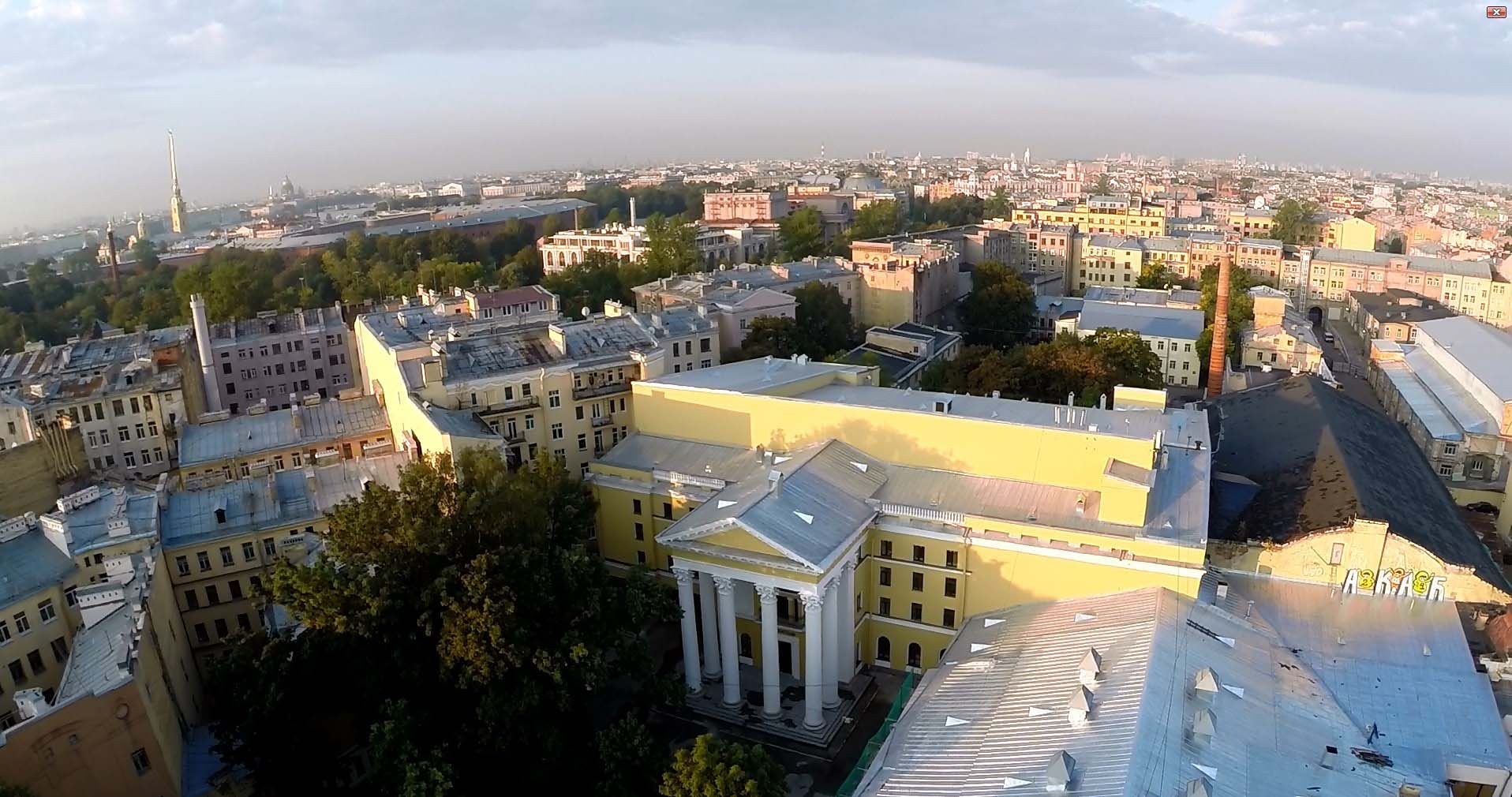
- Type: State-owned
- Industry: Film industry
- Founded: 1914; 112 years ago
- Headquarters: St. Petersburg, Russia
- Key people: Eduard Pichugin (Director-General)
- Products: Motion pictures television programs
- Parent: Federal Agency for State Property Management
- Website: www.lenfilm.ru

Lenfilm (Russian: Ленфильм, acronym of Leningrad Films) is a Russian production and distribution company with its own film studio located in Saint Petersburg (the city was called Leningrad from 1924 to 1991, thus the name). It is a corporation with its stakes shared between private owners and several private film studios which operate on the premises. Since October 2012, the Chairman of the board of directors is Fyodor Bondarchuk. It is one of the oldest active film studios in Russia.

== History ==
=== Before Lenfilm ===
St. Petersburg was home to several Russian and French film studios since the early 1900s. In 1908, St. Petersburg businessman Vladislav Karpinsky opened a film factory named Omnium Film, which produced documentaries and feature films for local theatres. During the 1910s, one of the most active private film studios was Neptun in St. Petersburg, where such figures as Vladimir Mayakovsky and Lilya Brik made their first silent films, released in 1917 and 1918.

Lenfilm's property was originally under the private ownership of the Aquarium garden, which belonged to the merchant Georgy Alexandrov, who operated a restaurant, a public garden and a theatre on the same site. Composer Peter Tchaikovsky came to what was then the Aquarium theatre (and is now Stage # 4 of Lenfilm) as a guest to the 1893 performance of the overture to his ballet The Nutcracker. Famous Russian bass singer Feodor Chaliapin performed there in the 1910s and the early 1920s. Stars of the Soviet era also gave performances there, such as Isaak Dunaevsky, and Leonid Utyosov with his jazz band during the 1920s and 1930s.

=== Petrograd and Leningrad film industry ===
The facilities and land of the Leningrad film studio were nationalized in 1918 and it was established as a Soviet state-funded film industry. Within just a few years it bore several different names, such as Petrograd Cinema Committee and SevZapKino, among various others. In 1923 the nationalized Aquarium garden was merged with SevZapKino and several smaller studios to form the Soviet state-controlled film industry in St. Petersburg. During 1924–1926 it was temporarily named Leningrad Film Factory Goskino and eventually changed its name several times during the 1920s and 1930s.

At that time many notable filmmakers, writers, and actors were active at the studio, such as Yevgeni Zamyatin, Grigori Kozintsev, Iosif Kheifets, Sergei Eisenstein, Sergei Yutkevich, Dmitri Shostakovich, Nikolai Akimov, Yuri Tynyanov, Veniamin Kaverin, Viktor Shklovsky, and the writers of Serapion Brothers, as well as many other figures of Russian and Soviet culture.

=== Lenfilm ===
The black-and-white version of the Lenfilm logo as it appears in Twenty Days Without War (1976)

Since 1934 the studio has been named Lenfilm.

During the Soviet era, Lenfilm was the second-largest (after Mosfilm) production branch of the Soviet film industry, which incorporated more than 30 film studios located across the former Soviet Union.

During World War II and the Siege of Leningrad, very few cinematographers remained active in the besieged Leningrad and made film documentaries about the heroic fight against the Nazis. At the same time, most personnel and production units of the Lenfilm studio were evacuated to cities in Central Asia, such as Alma-Ata (1942) and Samarkand. There Lenfilm temporarily merged with other Soviet film studios into the Central United Film Studio (TsOKS). Lenfilm returned to Leningrad in 1944.

Today in the Aquarium Theater there is a stage where many famous Lenfilm pictures were shot and many film stars played their roles. In 1975 George Cukor made a film there called The Blue Bird. Elizabeth Taylor was there, playing Queen of light in that film. Jane Fonda and Ava Gardner also worked there, at Stage # 4, the prior Aquarium Theatre. Orlando was partly filmed there with Tilda Swinton. Afghan Breakdown was shot there by Vladimir Bortko, with Michele Placido, who plays a Russian colonel. In the beginning of the 1990s there were about a dozen famous American scriptwriters and Oscar-winning actors and actresses who worked with Lenfilm.

By the end of the Soviet Union era, Lenfilm had produced about 1,500 films. Many film classics were produced at Lenfilm throughout its history and some of these were granted international awards at various film festivals.

=== Today ===
After the dissolution of the Soviet Union, Lenfilm became a quasi-private film production company of Russia, retaining its name in spite of renaming of the city of Leningrad to St. Petersburg.

Lenfilm is tightly connected with world celebrities, such as those mentioned as well as Jane Fonda, Maximilian Schell, Marina Vlady, Julia Ormond, Michael Caine, William Hurt, Sophie Marceau, Sean Bean, Sandrine Bonnaire, Gérard Philipe, and with many Russian celebrities, such as Vladimir Mayakovsky, Dmitri Shostakovich, Alexander Ney, Kirill Lavrov, Daniil Granin, Pavel Kadochnikov, Aleksandr Demyanenko, and Sergey Kuryokhin.

In 2004 Kinostudiya Lenfilm was re-organized into a privately owned company.

In 2007 Kinostudiya Lenfilm, together with Apple IMC, opened the Apple post-production training centre for filmmakers, where Apple computers are used for editing and special effects, as well as for training and certification of film editors in Final Cut Pro 5.1 and other Apple programs.

== Timeline and selected filmography ==
See Category:Lenfilm films

- 1934: Chapaev / Чапаев, directed by Brothers Vasilyev
- 1947: Zolushka / Золушка (film adaptation of Cinderella)
- 1949: Alexander Popov / Александр Попов (biographical film)
- 1954: The Boys from Leningrad / Запасной игрок, starring Georgi Vitsin, Vsevolod Kuznetsov, and Pavel Kadochnikov
- 1956: Old Khottabych (aka The Flying Carpet) / Старик Хоттабыч directed by Gennadi Kazansky, starring Nikolai Volkov and Alesha Litvinov
- 1960: The Lady with the Dog / Дама с собачкой directed by Iosif Kheifets, starring Iya Savvina and Aleksey Batalov
- 1960: The Queen of Spades / Пиковая дама (film adaptation)
- 1962: Amphibian Man / Человек-амфибия (film adaptation) directed by Gennadi Kazansky, starring Anastasiya Vertinskaya and Mikhail Kozakov
- 1963: Kain XVIII / Каин XVIII, directed by Erast Garin (film adaptation)
- 1964: Hamlet / Гамлет, directed by Grigori Kozintsev (drama), the Golden Lion Award at the Venice Film Festival in 1962 nominated and Special Jury Prize winner
- 1968: Dead Season / Мёртвый сезон (spy film), directed by Savva Kulish, and starring Donatas Banionis and Rolan Bykov
- 1969: Prince Igor, directed by Roman Tikhomirov, and starring Boris Khmelnitsky
- 1970: Franz Liszt. Dreams of love / Ференц Лист (drama), directed by Márton Keleti, and starring Imre Sinkovits and Ariadna Shengelaya.
- 1971: Dauria / Даурия, directed by Viktor Tregubovich (film adaptation) starring Vitaly Solomin and Yefim Kopelyan
- 1973: The Adventures of Milo & Otis / Приключения Чатрана, directed by Boris Dyozhkin
- 1976: The Blue Bird / Синяя птица, directed by George Cukor (film adaptation) starring Elizabeth Taylor
- 1976: Twenty Days Without War / Двадцать дней без войны, directed by Aleksei German
- 1976: Trust / Доверие, directed by Edvin Laine and Viktor Tregubovich
- 1978: The Lonely Voice of Man / Одинокий голос человека, directed by Alexander Sokurov (drama)
- 1980: The Degraded / Разжалованный, directed by Alexander Sokurov (short film)
- 1981: The Hound of the Baskervilles / Собака Баскервилей, directed by Igor Maslennikov (film adaptation)
- 1982: The Queen of Spades / Пиковая дама, directed by Igor Maslennikov (film adaptation)
- 1982: Golos / Голос, directed by Ilya Averbakh, (drama) starring Natalya Sayko and Leonid Filatov
- 1983: Painful Indifference / Скорбное бесчувствие, directed by Alexander Sokurov (war film)
- 1986: Empire / Ампир, directed by Alexander Sokurov (short film)
- 1987: Dead Man's Letters / Письма мёртвого человека (sci-fi)
- 1989: Vagrant Bus (The Stray Bus), directed by Joseph Kheifits, drama
- 1990: Taxi Blues co-production.
- 1991: Afghan Breakdown / Афганский излом (war film)
- 1991: My best friend, General Vasili, son of Joseph Stalin / Мой лучший друг, генерал Василий, сын Иосифа, directed by Viktor Sadovsky, drama starring Boris Schcherbakov and Vladimir Steklov
- 1995: Peculiarities of the National Hunt / Особенности национальной охоты (comedy), directed by Aleksandr Rogozhkin
- 1996: Anna Karenina / Анна Каренина, directed by Bernard Rose, drama starring Sophie Marceau and Sean Bean, with Alfred Molina and Mia Kirshner
- 2010: The Amazing Race 17 had a task in which the teams had to search through piles of filmstrips for a filmstrip from October
- 2011: The White Guard / Белая гвардия, first adaption of the novel by Mikhail Bulgakov with Konstantin Khabensky and Mikhail Porechenkov. Directed by Sergey Snezhkin
- 2012: Sherlock Holmes / Шерлок Холмс, TV series directed by Andrey Kavun, starring Igor Petrenko, Andrei Panin, Mikhail Boyarsky and Ingeborga Dapkūnaitė
- 2012: Idolatress / Поклонница
- 2013: Hard to be a God / Трудно быть богом
- 2015: Catherine the Great, directed by Igor Zaitsev
- 2017: Bird / Птица (comedy-drama), directed by Ksenia Baskakova
