= 1959 in the United Kingdom =

Events from the year 1959 in the United Kingdom.

== Incumbents ==
- Monarch – Elizabeth II
- Prime Minister – Harold Macmillan (Conservative)

== Events ==
- 15 January – Tyne Tees Television, the ITV franchise for North East England, goes on the air.
- 22 January – Racing driver Mike Hawthorn is killed after his Jaguar 3.4-litre car collides with a tree on the A3 near Guildford.
- 29 January – Dense fog brings chaos to Britain.
- 19 February – First of the London and Zürich Agreements under which the UK agrees to grant independence to Cyprus.
- 23 February – Prime Minister Harold Macmillan holds talks with the Soviet leader Nikita Khrushchev on a visit to the USSR.
- 7 March – Independence movement leader Kanyama Chiume, wanted in the British territory of Nyasaland, flees to London and goes into hiding.
- 10 March – The comedy film Carlton-Browne of the F.O. (U.S. title: Man in a Cocked Hat) is released.
- 30 March – 20,000 demonstrators attend a CND rally in Trafalgar Square.

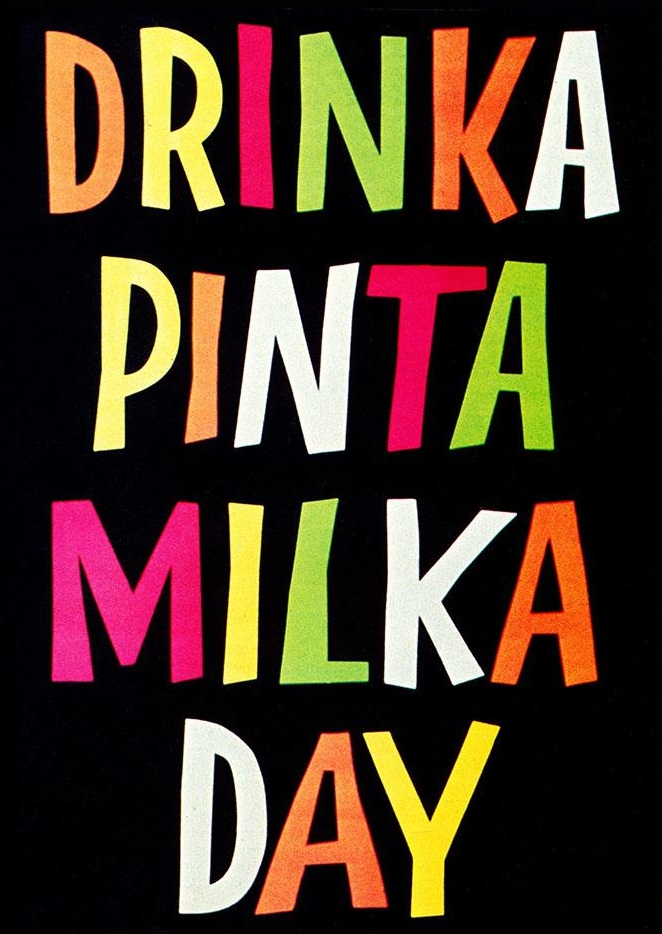
Poster introduced in April

- 1 April – The official name of the administrative county of Hampshire is changed from "County of Southampton" to "County of Hampshire".
- 2 April – United Dairies merges with Cow & Gate to form Unigate Dairies.
- 22 April – Ballerina Margot Fonteyn is released from prison in Panama following involvement in her husband's planned coup against the government of President Ernesto de la Guardia.
- 30 April – Icelandic gunboat fires on British trawlers in the first of the Cod Wars over fishing rights.

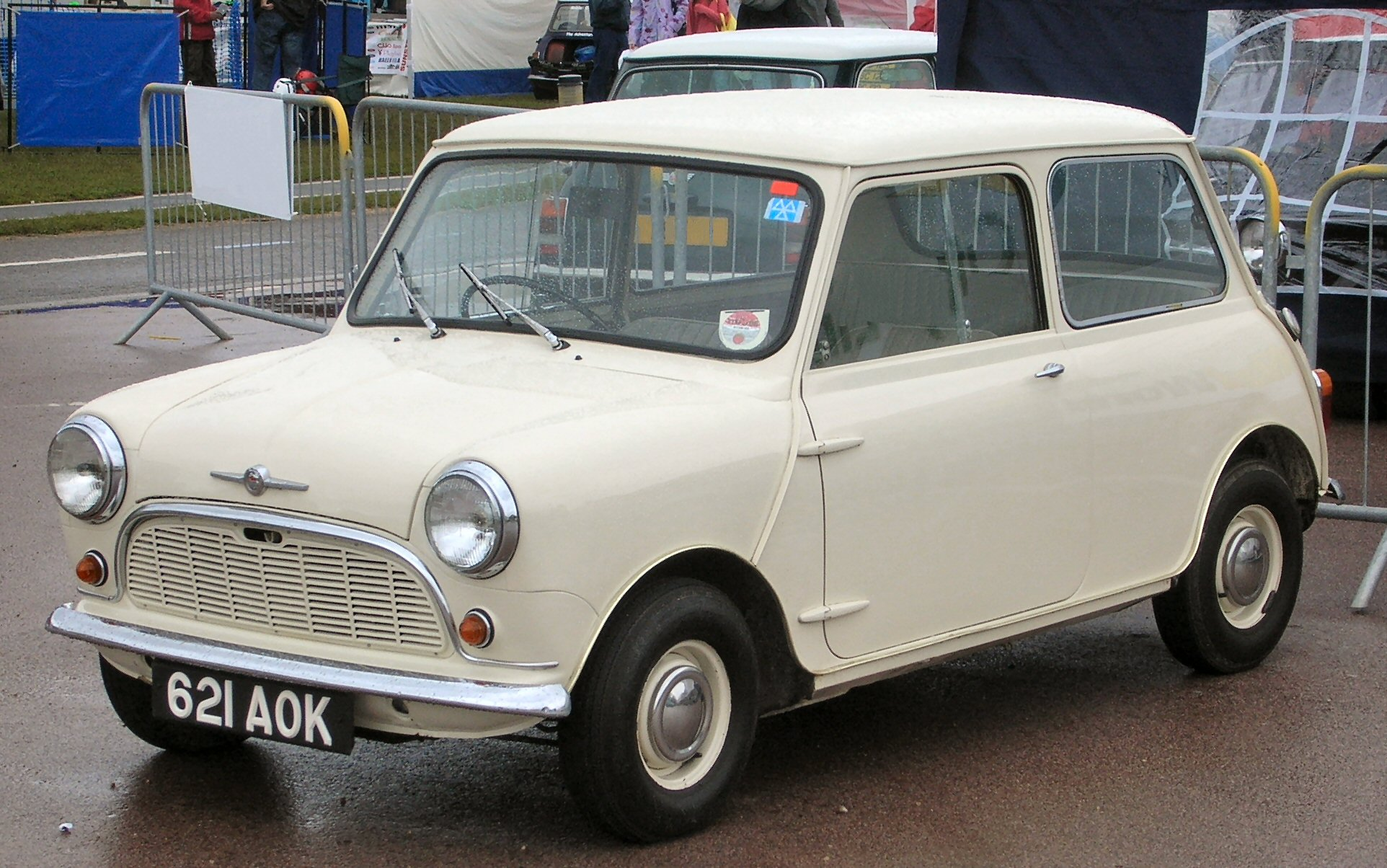
First Morris Mini-Minor off the production line, 8 May, ready for public launch in August.

- 2 May
  - The Chapelcross nuclear power station in Scotland opens.
  - Nottingham Forest beat Luton Town 2–1 in the FA Cup final at Wembley Stadium.
- 7 May – Scientist and novelist C. P. Snow delivers an influential Rede Lecture on The Two Cultures, concerning a perceived breakdown of communication between the sciences and humanities, in the Senate House, University of Cambridge. It is subsequently published as The Two Cultures and the Scientific Revolution.
- 24 May – British Empire Day becomes Commonwealth Day.
- 28 May – The Mermaid Theatre opens in the City of London.
- May – The first Ten Tors event is held on Dartmoor.
- June – Import tariffs are lifted in the United Kingdom.
- 1 June – The first episode of Juke Box Jury airs on BBC Television, chaired by David Jacobs.
- 3 June – Singapore is granted self-governing status.
- 11 June – Christopher Cockerell's invention of the hovercraft is officially launched. On 25 July, the SR.N1 craft crosses the English Channel from Calais to Dover in just over 2 hours.
- 22 June – Harrods enters talks with Debenhams over a possible £34,000,000 merger.
- 23 June – Klaus Fuchs is released from Wakefield prison having served over nine years for giving British nuclear secrets to the Soviet Union and moves to East Germany.
- 9 July – Wing Commander Michael Beetham flying a Royal Air Force Vickers Valiant sets a record of 11 hours 27 minutes for a non-stop London–Cape Town flight.
- 10 July – Cliff Richard and The Drifters release the song "Living Doll" (written by Lionel Bart) as a single.
- 28 July – UK postcodes are introduced for the first time, albeit as an experiment, in the city of Norwich.
- 29 July
  - The Mental Health Act becomes law, modernising the care of mental disorders.
  - The Obscene Publications Act becomes law.
  - The Legitimacy Act becomes law, permitting the legitimisation of a child, one of whose parents was married to a third person at the time of their birth, by subsequent marriage of the parents.
- 4 August – Barclays become the first bank to install a computer.
- 24 August – House of Fraser wins the bidding war for Harrods in a £37,000,000 deal.
- 26 August – BMC launches the Mini to showrooms, a two-door, 10-foot-long car with an 848cc four-cylinder transverse engine and a top speed of 70 mph, designed to carry the driver and three passengers and their luggage in comfort. The designer is Alec Issigonis who also designed the Morris Minor. It will remain in production until the year 2000 and be replaced with a BMW-made version a year later.
- 31 August – Harold Macmillan and US President Dwight Eisenhower make a joint television broadcast from Downing Street.
- 18 September – Auchengeich mining disaster: 47 miners die as the result of an underground fire at Auchengeich Colliery, Lanarkshire, Scotland.
- 7 October – Southend Pier is damaged in a fire.
- 8 October – The 1959 General Election is held resulting in a record third successive Conservative victory. Harold Macmillan, running under the slogan "Life's better with the Conservatives, Don't let Labour ruin it", increases the Conservative majority in Parliament to 100 seats. The Labour Party contest their first (and only) General Election under the leadership of Hugh Gaitskell. Among the new Members of Parliament entering the Commons for the first time are future Prime Minister Margaret Thatcher who will represent Finchley in North London for 33 years and future leader of the Liberal Party Jeremy Thorpe.
- 12 October – A large-scale diamond robbery takes place in London.
- 21 October – Mau Mau leader Dedan Kimathi is arrested in Nyeri, Kenya.
- 30 October – Ronnie Scott's Jazz Club opens in the Soho district of London.
- 2 November – The first section of the M1 motorway is opened between Watford and Rugby. It is set to be extended over the next few years, southwards to Edgware and northwards to Leeds.
- 5 November – Philip John Noel-Baker wins the Nobel Peace Prize.
- 11 November – London Transport introduces the production AEC Routemaster double-decker bus into public service.
- 14 November – The nuclear Dounreay Fast Reactor in Scotland achieves criticality.
- 17 November – Prestwick and Renfrew Airport in Scotland become the first airports in the UK with duty-free shops.
- 20 November – Britain becomes a founder member of the European Free Trade Association.
- December – Health enthusiast Dr. Barbara Moore walks from Edinburgh to London.
- 6 December – Aberdeen trawler George Robb runs aground at Duncansby Head in Scotland in a severe gale with the loss of all 12 crew.
- 8 December – Broughty Ferry life-boat Mona capsizes on service to North Carr Lightship in Scotland, all eight life-boat crew are lost.
- 28 December – Associated-Rediffusion first airs the children's television series Ivor the Engine, made by Oliver Postgate and Peter Firmin's Smallfilms in stop motion animation using cardboard cut-outs.

=== Undated ===
- London County Council completes the first portion of Alton Estate in Roehampton, southwest London, considered a model of post-war public housing.
- "Aluminium War": concluding the first hostile takeover of a public company in the UK, Tube Investments (under its chairman Ivan Stedeford), allied with Reynolds Metals of the United States and advised by Siegmund Warburg of S. G. Warburg & Co., secure control of British Aluminium.
- The iconic Bush TR82 transistor radio, by Ogle Design, is launched.
- North of Scotland Hydro-Electric Board's Sloy-Awe Hydro-Electric Power Scheme becomes fully operational.
- The Noise Abatement Society is established.
- Car ownership in Britain now exceeds 30% of households.
- Economic growth for the year is a very strong 7.2% while the Retail Price Index shows a zero percentage change over the year.
- Approximate date, Ballads and Blues folk club founded by Ewan MacColl and others in a London pub in Soho as part of the second British folk revival.

== Publications ==
- Agatha Christie's novel Cat Among the Pigeons, featuring Hercule Poirot.
- Ian Fleming's James Bond novel Goldfinger.
- Colin MacInnes' novel Absolute Beginners.
- Spike Milligan's collection Silly Verse for Kids.
- Iona and Peter Opie's study The Lore and Language of Schoolchildren.
- Mervyn Peake's novel Titus Alone, last completed of the Gormenghast series.
- Alan Sillitoe's story The Loneliness of the Long Distance Runner.
- Keith Waterhouse's novel Billy Liar.

== Births ==
=== January – February ===
- 4 January – John Batchelor, racing driver, businessman and political activist (died 2010)
- 5 January – David Eastwood, English historian and academic
- 7 January – Angela Smith, British Labour Co-operative politician and MP for Basildon
- 12 January – Simon Tolkien, novelist
- 16 January – Sade Adu, Nigerian-born British singer-songwriter and record producer
- 24 January – Jim Moir (Vic Reeves), English comedian and artist
- 29 January – Frank Key, writer (died 2019)
- 30 January – Alex Hyde-White, English actor
- 3 February – Lol Tolhurst, cofounder and drummer/keyboardist of rock band The Cure
- 4 February – John Wraw, Anglican prelate (died 2017)
- 6 February – Martyn Quayle, politician (died 2016)
- 7 February – Mick McCarthy, football player and manager
- 11 February – Deborah Meaden, businesswoman
- 15 February
  - Adam Boulton, English journalist
  - Ali Campbell, English singer-songwriter and guitarist
  - Martin Rowson, English author and illustrator
- 17 February – Dave Courtney, gangster, author and actor (died 2023)
- 18 February
  - Jayne Atkinson, English-born actress
  - David Parker, swimmer (died 2010)
- 23 February – Richard Dodds, British field hockey player
- 27 February – Simon Critchley, British philosopher

=== March – April ===
- 1 March – Nick Griffin, British politician, chairman of the British National Party (BNP)
- 9 March – Mark Carwardine, British zoologist
- 15 March – Ben Okri, Nigerian-born poet and novelist
- 19 March – Terry Hall, British singer (died 2022)
- 20 March
  - Steve McFadden, British actor
  - Peter Truscott, Baron Truscott, Labour politician and peer
- 21 March – Colin Jones, Welsh boxer
- 29 March – Richard Cousins, English businessman (died 2017)
- 30 March – Andrew Bailey, English banker
- 4 April – Gordon Dunne, Northern Irish politician (died 2021)
- 5 April – Ian Pearson, British Labour politician and MP for Dudley South
- 7 April – Nigel Walker, footballer (died 2014)
- 8 Apri – Martin Weston, cricketer
- 9 April – Bernard Jenkin, politician
- 11 April – John Myers, radio executive (died 2019)
- 14 April – Ali Brownlee, radio sports broadcaster (died 2016)
- 15 April – Emma Thompson, English actress, comedian and screenwriter
- 16 April
  - Yvonne Carter, general practitioner and academic (died 2009)
  - Alison Ramsay, Scottish field hockey player
- 17 April
  - Imogen Bain, actress (died 2014)
  - Sean Bean, actor
  - Peter Doig, British painter
- 19 April – Jane Campbell, Baroness Campbell of Surbiton, disability rights campaigner
- 21 April – Robert Smith, gothic rock singer-songwriter (The Cure)
- 24 April – Paula Yates, television presenter (died 2000)
- 25 April – Adrian Sanders, British Liberal Democrat politician and MP for Torbay
- 27 April – Sheena Easton, Scottish singer

=== May – June ===
- 1 May – David Cordier, countertenor (died 2025)
- 3 May – Ben Elton, English comedian and writer
- 4 May – Dick Bradsell, bartender (died 2016)
- 5 May – Ian McCulloch, English rock singer-songwriter (Echo & the Bunnymen)
- 8 May
  - Kevin McCloud, television presenter
  - David Manners, 11th Duke of Rutland, aristocrat and politician
- 12 May
  - Mark Davies, Roman Catholic bishop of Shrewsbury
  - Deborah Warner, stage director and producer
- 13 May – Peter Longbottom, cyclist (died 1998)
- 15 May – Andrew Eldritch, English gothic rock singer-songwriter (The Sisters of Mercy)
- 16 May – Tracy Hyde, English actress and model
- 17 May – Richard Barrons, English general
- 18 May
  - Graham Dilley, cricketer (died 2011)
  - Rupert Soames, businessman
- 20 May
  - Annabel Giles, broadcaster and actress (died 2023)
  - Gregory Gray, Northern Irish singer-songwriter (died 2019)
- 22 May
  - Graham Fellows, English comedy performer
  - Morrissey, English alternative rock singer-songwriter
  - Jon Sopel, journalist and television presenter
- 23 May – Bob Mortimer, English comedian and actor
- 24 May – Sharon Peacock, microbiologist
- 25 May – Julian Clary, comedian
- 27 May – Gerard Kelly, Scottish actor (died 2010)
- 28 May
  - Bernardine Evaristo, author and academic
  - John Morgan, writer and etiquette expert (died 2000)
- 29 May
  - Rupert Everett, English actor
  - Adrian Paul, English-born actor
  - Tessa Tennant, English green investment campaigner (died 2018)
- 30 May – David Thomas, cricketer (died 2012)
- 1 June
  - Martin Brundle, English Formula One motor racing driver
  - John Pullinger, English statistician and librarian
  - Peter Skinner, English Labour politician and MEP for South East England
- 6 June – Lindsay Posner, English theatre director and manager
- 11 June – Hugh Laurie, English actor, comedian and writer
- 19 June
  - Ray Deakin, footballer (died 2008)
  - Sophie Grigson, English cookery writer and celebrity chef
- 21 June – John Baron, English Conservative politician and MP for Billericay
- 24 June – Andy McCluskey, musician and songwriter (OMD)
- 26 June – Lucy Kellaway, English columnist at the Financial Times and teacher
- 27 June – Clint Boon, English rock keyboardist (Inspiral Carpets) and DJ
- 28 June – Sally Morgan, Baroness Morgan of Huyton, English Labour politician and educationalist
- 29 June – Richard Vranch, English comedian, actor and television panel show participant
- 30 June – Jane Gregory, Olympic equestrian (died 2011)

=== July – August ===
- 3 July
  - Julie Burchill, journalist
  - Graham Roberts, footballer and manager
- 4 July – Jan Brittin, cricketer (died 2017)
- 8 July – Pauline Quirke, actress
- 9 July
  - Jim Kerr, singer
  - Clive Stafford Smith, civil rights activist
- 11 July – Steve Whatley, actor and television presenter (died 2005)
- 13 July – Richard Leman, field hockey player
- 15 July – Charles Farr, civil servant (died 2019)
- 16 July
  - Joanna MacGregor, pianist
  - James MacMillan, composer and conductor
- 18 July – Jonathan Dove, operatic composer
- 29 July – John Sykes, guitarist (died 2024)
- 31 July – Kim Newman, journalist, film critic and fiction writer
- 1 August
  - Joe Elliott, rock singer (Def Leppard)
  - Desmond Noonan, gangster (died 2005)
- 5 August – Pete Burns, pop singer (died 2016)
- 19 August – Russell Foster, neuroscientist
- 20 August – Andrew Pelling, Conservative politician and MP for Croydon Central
- 24 August – Meg Munn, Labour Co-operative politician and MP for Sheffield Heeley
- 27 August – Jeanette Winterson, novelist
- 28 August – John Yems, football manager
- 29 August – Stephen Wolfram, scientist

=== September – October ===
- 8 September – Judy Murray, tennis coach
- 11 September – Colin Butts, novelist and screenwriter (died 2018)
- 12 September
  - Mike Barrett, footballer (died 1984)
  - Julia Samuel, psychotherapist
- 13 September – Andy Gray, Scottish actor (died 2021)
- 18 September
  - Ian Arkwright, English footballer
  - Lucy Birley, model, photographer and socialite (died 2018)
- 20 September – Kevin Stonehouse, footballer (died 2019)
- 21 September – Corinne Drewery, singer-songwriter and fashion designer
- 23 September
  - Frank Cottrell-Boyce, writer
  - Karen Pierce, British diplomat
- 24 September – Drummie Zeb, reggae musician (died 2022)
- 28 September – Paul 'Trouble' Anderson, DJ (died 2018)
- 4 October – Chris Lowe, synth-pop singer-songwriter
- 7 October – Simon Cowell, English music producer and television talent show judge
- 10 October
  - Mark Johnston, Scottish-born racehorse trainer
  - Kirsty MacColl, British singer-songwriter (died 2000)
- 15 October
  - Sarah Ferguson
  - Tibor Fischer, British fiction writer
  - Andy Holmes, rower (died 2010)
- 16 October
  - Gary Kemp, English pop artist (Spandau Ballet)
  - John Whittingdale, British Conservative politician and MP for Maldon and Chelmsford East
- 20 October – Niamh Cusack, Irish-born actress
- 21 October – Cleveland Watkiss, jazz vocalist
- 24 October – Ruth Perednik, English-Israeli psychologist and academic
- 27 October – Liz Howe, ecologist (died 2019)

=== November – December ===
- 1 November – Susanna Clarke, British writer
- 2 November
  - Kevin Ashman, English quiz player
  - Peter Mullan, Scottish actor
- 9 November
  - Andy Kershaw, British music broadcaster (died 2026)
  - Frances O'Grady, British trade union leader
  - Tony Slattery, actor and comedian (died 2025)
- 13 November – Caroline Goodall, actress
- 14 November – Paul McGann, British actor
- 18 November – Jimmy Quinn, Irish footballer and football manager
- 23 November – Maxwell Caulfield, British actor
- 25 November
  - Mark Andrews, rower (died 2020)
  - Charles Kennedy, Scottish Liberal Democrat politician (died 2015)
- 26 November – Dai Davies, Welsh politician and independent MP
- 30 November – Lorraine Kelly, Scottish presenter and journalist
- 1 December – Billy Childish, English painter, writer and musician
- 2 December – Gwyneth Strong, British actress
- 5 December – Robbie France, drummer (died 2012)
- 6 December – Stephen Hepburn, British Labour MP for Jarrow
- 10 December – Kevin Ash, journalist and author (d. 2013)
- 11 December – Phil Woolas, disgraced Labour MP
- 12 December – Jasper Conran, English designer
- 28 December – Andy McNab, British soldier turned novelist
- 29 November – Richard Borcherds, mathematician
- 30 December
  - Antonio Pappano, conductor and pianist
  - Tracey Ullman, English comedian, actress, singer, dancer, screenwriter and author

=== Unknown dates ===
- Amanda Craig, British novelist
- Edith Hall, classicist
- Mick Hume, British journalist and organiser of the Revolutionary Communist Party
- Mick Manning, British children's author and illustrator
- Jasper Morrison, English product and furniture designer

== Deaths ==
- 14 January – G. D. H. Cole, political and economic theorist, historian and detective fiction writer (born 1889)
- 22 January – Mike Hawthorn, English race car driver (car crash) (born 1929)
- 15 February – Sir Owens Willans Richardson, British physicist, Nobel Prize laureate (born 1879)
- 20 February – Laurence Housman, playwright and writer (born 1865)
- 21 February – Kathleen Freeman, classical scholar (born 1897)
- 24 February – Arthur Young, actor (born 1898)
- 26 February – Princess Alexandra, 2nd Duchess of Fife (Princess Arthur of Connaught), member of the royal family (born 1891)
- 25 April – Janet Philip, academic administrator (born 1876)
- 16 May – Elisha Scott, Northern Irish footballer (born 1894)
- 17 May – George Albert Smith, English film pioneer (born 1864)
- 11 June – Gordon Selwyn, educator and Anglican priest (born 1885)
- 11 July – Charlie Parker, English cricketer (born 1882)
- 5 August – Edgar A. Guest, English poet (born 1881)
- 19 August
  - Jacob Epstein, American-born British sculptor (born 1880)
  - Claude Grahame-White, English aviator (born 1879)
- 6 September – Kay Kendall, English actress (born 1926) (leukaemia)
- 21 September – Agnes Nicholls, operatic soprano (born 1877)
- 25 September
  - Gerard Hoffnung, German-born humorist (born 1925)
  - Vera Laughton Mathews, naval officer (born 1888)
- 15 November – Charles Thomson Rees Wilson, Scottish physicist, Nobel Prize laureate (born 1869)
- 26 November – Albert Ketèlbey, pianist, conductor and composer (born 1875)
- 14 December – Stanley Spencer, painter (born 1891)

== See also ==
- 1959 in British music
- 1959 in British television
- List of British films of 1959
