= 1959 in British television =

This is a list of British television related events from 1959.

== Events ==
=== January ===
- 1 January – The first broadcast of the Vienna New Year's Concert from Austria airs on BBC Television.
- 15 January – Tyne Tees Television, the ITV franchise for North East England, goes on air.

=== February ===
- 1 February – The first interracial kiss on television occurs during a live performance of Ted Willis's play Hot Summer Night, broadcast in the ABC Armchair Theatre strand. The kiss is between Andrée Melly and Lloyd Reckord (who will feature in another early televised interracial kiss three years later in the play You in Your Small Corner).

=== June ===
- 1 June – Juke Box Jury premieres on the BBC Television Service.

=== September ===
- 25 September – The fifth series of Hancock's Half Hour premieres on BBC Television, with all episodes being made as telerecordings. It includes, on 16 October, the parody episode "Twelve Angry Men". Anthony Hancock decides that he no longer wishes to work with Sid James.

=== October ===
- 5 October – Ahead of the launch of ITV in the area, the first regional news bulletin from East Anglia is broadcast by the BBC. The launch concedes with a new studio opening in Norwich. On the same day, a new radio transmitter at Morborne Hill, near Peterborough, launches providing good very high frequency radio and television to the area which includes Huntingdonshire, Ely and parts of the surrounding counties.
- 8–9 October – The BBC, and for the first time, ITV broadcast live coverage of the results of the 1959 United Kingdom general election. The BBC keeps the overnight coverage but does not retain its broadcast from the following day.
- 18 October – ITV screens Alun Owen's No Trams to Lime Street in ABC's Armchair Theatre series.
- 27 October – Anglia Television, the ITV franchise for Eastern England, goes on air.
- 31 October – Ulster Television, the ITV franchise for Northern Ireland, goes on air.

=== Undated ===
- Unsuccessful advertisements for Strand cigarettes run on ITV.

== Debuts ==
=== BBC Television Service/BBC TV ===
- 7 January – The Nightwatchman's Stories (1959)
- 14 January – The Cabin in the Clearing (1959)
- 17 January – The Honey Siege (1959)
- 23 January – The Third Man (1959–1965)
- 30 January – The Last Chronicle of Barset (1959)
- 4 February – Face to Face (1959–1962)
- 9 February – The Scarf (1959)
- 28 February – Garry Halliday (1959–1962)
- 21 March – Whicker's World (1959–1994)
- 25 March – Morning in the Streets (1959)
- 3 April – Love and Mr Lewisham (1959)
- 4 April – Charlesworth (1959)
- 4 April – Drumbeat (1959)
- 5 April – Great Expectations (1959)
- 8 April – The Two Charleys (1959)
- 14 April – The Offshore Island (1959)
- 22 April – A Soho Story (1959)
- 1 May – Frankly Howerd (1959)
- 15 May – Hilda Lessways (1959)
- 1 June
  - Juke Box Jury (1959–1967, 1979, 1989–1990)
  - The Widow of Bath (1959)
- 3 June – On the Bright Side (1959)
- 12 June – The Adventures of Brigadier Wellington-Bull (1959)
- 26 June – The Eustace Diamonds (1959)
- 5 July – The Golden Spur (1959)
- 13 July – The Naked Lady (1959)
- 25 July – The Ken Dodd Show (1959–1969)
- 10 August – Campion (1959–1960)
- 23 August – The Moonstone (1959)
- 26 August – Call Me Sam (1959)
- 28 August – The History of Mr. Polly (1959)
- 3 September – Spycatcher (1959–1961)
- 11 September – Noggin the Nog (1959–1965; 1982)
- 21 September – A Mask for Alexis (1959)
- 28 September – The Artful Dodger (1959)
- 11 October – Redgauntlet (1959)
- 15 October – Who, Me? (1959)
- 16 October – Bleak House (1959)
- 2 November – The Men from Room 13 (1959–1961)
- 3 November – Ask For King Billy (1959)
- 7 November – Three Golden Nobles (1959)
- 11 December – Para Handy - Master Mariner (1959–1960)
- Unknown – World Theatre (1959)

=== ITV ===
- 11 January – Torchy the Battery Boy (1959–1961)
- 8 April – Crime Sheet (1959)
- 1 June – Don't Tell Father (1959)
- 14 June – Sunday's Child (1959)
- 2 July – Skyport (1959–1960)
- 6 July – Something in the City (1959)
- 13 July – Nick of the River (1959)
- 10 August – Gert and Daisy (1959)
- 1 September – The Secret of Carrick House (1959)
- 12 September – The Man Who Finally Died (1959)
- 13 September – Interpol Calling (1959–1960)
- 14 September – Probation Officer (1959–1962)
- 16 September – No Hiding Place (1959–1967)
- 17 September – The Four Just Men (1959–1960)
- 23 September – Tell It to the Marines (1959–1960)
- 13 October – Knight Errant Limited (1959–1961)
- 31 October – Epilogue to Capricorn (1959)
- 9 December – 77 Sunset Strip (1958–1964)
- 12 December – The Voodoo Factor (1959–1960)
- 24 December
  - Rawhide (1959–1965)
  - Tales from Dickens (1959–1961)
- 26 December – International Detective (1959–1961)
- 28 December – Ivor the Engine (1959, 1975–1977)
- Unknown
  - Maverick (1957–1962)
  - Glencannon (1959–1960)
  - The Flying Doctor (1959)
  - Foo Foo (1959–1960)

== Continuing television shows ==
=== 1920s ===
- BBC Wimbledon (1927–1939, 1946–2019, 2021–2024)

=== 1930s ===
- Trooping the Colour (1937–1939, 1946–2019, 2023–present)
- The Boat Race (1938–1939, 1946–2019, 2021–present)
- BBC Cricket (1939, 1946–1999, 2020–2024)

=== 1940s ===
- Come Dancing (1949–1998)

=== 1950s ===
- Andy Pandy (1950–1970, 2002–2005)
- All Your Own (1952–1961)
- Watch with Mother (1952–1975)
- Rag, Tag and Bobtail (1953–1965)
- The Good Old Days (1953–1983)
- Panorama (1953–present)
- The Adventures of Robin Hood (1955–1960)
- Picture Book (1955–1965)
- Sunday Night at the London Palladium (1955–1967, 1973–1974)
- Take Your Pick! (1955–1968, 1992–1998)
- Double Your Money (1955–1968)
- Dixon of Dock Green (1955–1976)
- Crackerjack (1955–1970, 1972–1984, 2020–2021)
- Hancock's Half Hour (1956–1961)
- ITV Wimbledon (1956–1968)
- Opportunity Knocks (1956–1978, 1987–1990)
- This Week (1956–1978, 1986–1992)
- Armchair Theatre (1956–1974)
- What the Papers Say (1956–2008)
- The Army Game (1957–1961)
- The Sky at Night (1957–present)
- Blue Peter (1958–present)
- Grandstand (1958–2007)

== Ending this year ==
- The Adventures of Twizzle (1957–1959)
- The Adventures of William Tell (1958–1959)
- The Invisible Man (1958–1959)
- Ivanhoe (1958–1959)
- Oh Boy! (1958–1959)
- Our Mutual Friend (1958–1959)
- Quatermass and the Pit (1958–1959)

== Births ==
- 30 January – Alex Hyde-White, actor
- 15 February – Adam Boulton, television journalist
- 20 March – Steve McFadden, actor
- 22 March – Stephen Lambert, media executive
- 1 April – Joanna Kanska, actress
- 15 April – Emma Thompson, actress and screenwriter
- 24 April – Paula Yates, television presenter (died 2000)
- 27 April – Neil Pearson, actor
- 3 May – Ben Elton, comedian, scriptwriter and novelist
- 8 May – Kevin McCloud, designer, author and television host
- 16 May – Tracy Hyde, actress and model
- 22 May – Jon Sopel, television presenter and BBC correspondent
- 27 May – Gerard Kelly, Scottish actor (died 2010)
- 29 May – Adrian Paul, actor
- 6 June – Josie Lawrence, actress
- 11 June – Hugh Laurie, actor, comedian and writer
- 29 June – Richard Vranch, comedian, actor and television panel show participant
- 8 July – Pauline Quirke, actress
- 31 July – Andrew Marr, Scottish-born journalist
- 3 September – Dick Strawbridge, Burma-born colonel and factual television presenter
- 10 September – Helen Pearson, actress
- 17 September – Charles Lawson, actor
- 7 October – Simon Cowell, music producer and television talent show judge
- 11 October – David Morgan, Canada-born broadcast journalist working in Northern Ireland (died 2016)
- 20 October – Niamh Cusack, Irish-born actress
- 2 November – Peter Mullan, actor
- 9 November – Tony Slattery, actor and comedian (died 2025)
- 11 November – David Easter, actor
- 13 November – Caroline Goodall, actress
- 14 November – Paul McGann, British actor
- 24 November – Lucy Meacock, journalist and newsreader
- 30 November – Lorraine Kelly, Scottish presenter and journalist
- 2 December – Gwyneth Strong, British actress
- 3 December – Eamonn Holmes, Northern Ireland-born journalist and television personality
- 11 December – Nigel Pivaro, actor and journalist
- 30 December – Tracey Ullman, English comedian, actress, singer, dancer, screenwriter and author

== See also ==
- 1959 in British music
- 1959 in the United Kingdom
- List of British films of 1959
