= Aguinis =

Aguinis is a surname. Notable people with the surname include:

- Herman Aguinis, American researcher and professor serving as Avram Tucker Distinguished Scholar at George Washington University School of Business and Past President of the Academy of Management
- Marcos Aguinis (born 1935), Argentine writer
