= Francisco Maldonado da Silva =

Argentine marrano physician who was burned at the stake

- Born: Eliahu Hanazir; 1592; San Miguel de Tucumán
- Died: 23 January 1639 (aged 46–47); Lima, Peru
- Cause of death: Auto-da-fé

Francisco Maldonado da Silva (Jewish name: Eliahu Hanazir; 1592 in Argentina – 23 January 1639, in Peru) was an Argentine marrano physician who was burned at the stake with eleven other Jews in Lima, Peru, in the largest Auto-da-fé recorded in history. His life has been novelized by Argentine best selling author Marcos Aguinis in the book Against the Inquisition.

== Early life ==
Francisco was born in San Miguel de Tucumán to a wealthy Argentine marrano family of Portuguese Jewish background. He learned about his Jewishness through his father Diego Nuñez da Silva, who was a European Jewish physician.

== Medical life ==
Francisco studied the scriptures and Kabbalah while he was a medical student. After a few years he took a medical posting in Chile, during that time, he decided to assume fully his Jewishness and stop living as a Christian converse (marrano converso), regaining his family's depressed Jewish tradition by performing circumcision and adopting the name Eliahu Hanazir, also called popularly Eli Nazareno or Elijah the Nazarite. He grew his hair and beard and started signing his name "Heli Nazareo, unworthy servant of God of Israel, alias Silva". He was abducted at night and taken to Lima where he was held in the secret prisons of the Inquisition for six years. During those years, he was confronted 13 times by Catholic theologians who tried to help him find the "True Faith". His astounding knowledge made him valuable even to his enemies. He was held accountable for the heresy of honoring the "Law of Moses", totally objectionable to the Holy Inquisition.

== His martyrdom ==
At the time of his death, he had been imprisoned since 1627 and taken to the Colonial Inquisition Court of Lima, Peru. According to a 2010 book, he was imprisoned because he tried to convert his two sisters, who had converted to Catholicism, and as such he was denounced. The rodent Oecomys franciscorum was named after him and Pope Francis.

== Bibliography ==
- http://www.jewishencyclopedia.com/view.jsp?artid=715&letter=S
- Aguinis, Marcos. Against the Inquisition. AmazonCrossing, 2018.
- Kohut, George Alexander. "The Trial of Francisco Maldonado De Silva." In Publications of the American Jewish Historical Society Vol. 11 (1903), pp. 163–189.
