= La Gesta del Marrano =

La Gesta del Marrano (published in English as Against the Inquisition) is a novel written by renowned prize-winning Argentine author Marcos Aguinis.

This novel tells the story of Francisco Maldonado da Silva, a physician born in San Miguel de Tucumán, Argentina, who discovered his Jewish origin and decided to assume fully his Jewishness and stop hiding as a Christian (marrano). Maldonado was imprisoned by the Holy Inquisition, tried, and condemned for heresy.

The book was released in English by Amazon Publishing in 2018 under the title Against the Inquisition.
