= List of British films of 1959 =

A list of films produced in the United Kingdom in 1959 (see 1959 in film):

== 1959 ==
Title	Director	Cast	Genre	Notes
1959
The 39 Steps	Ralph Thomas	Kenneth More, Taina Elg, Barry Jones	Thriller	Remake of the 1935 film
Alive and Kicking	Cyril Frankel	Sybil Thorndike, Kathleen Harrison, Stanley Holloway	Comedy	
The Bandit of Zhobe	John Gilling	Victor Mature, Anne Aubrey, Anthony Newley	Adventure	
The Battle of the Sexes	Charles Crichton	Peter Sellers, Robert Morley, Constance Cummings	Comedy	
Behemoth, the Sea Monster	Eugène Lourié, Douglas Hickox	Gene Evans, André Morell, Jack MacGowran	Sci-fi	
Blind Date	Joseph Losey	Hardy Krüger, Stanley Baker, Micheline Presle	Crime	
Bobbikins	Robert Day	Shirley Jones, Max Bygraves, Billie Whitelaw	Comedy	
The Boy and the Bridge	Kevin McClory	Ian Maclaine, Liam Redmond	Drama	
Breakout	Peter Graham Scott	Lee Patterson, Hazel Court, Terence Alexander	Drama	
The Bridal Path	Frank Launder	Bill Travers, George Cole, Bernadette O'Farrell	Comedy	
The Captain's Table	Jack Lee	John Gregson, Peggy Cummins, Donald Sinden	Comedy	
Carlton-Browne of the F.O.	Roy Boulting, Jeffrey Dell	Terry-Thomas, Peter Sellers, Luciana Paluzzi	Comedy	
Carry On Nurse	Gerald Thomas	Shirley Eaton, Kenneth Williams, Joan Sims	Comedy	
Carry On Teacher	Gerald Thomas	Leslie Phillips, Kenneth Williams, Kenneth Connor	Comedy	
The Cat Gang	Darrell Catling	Francesca Annis, John Pike	Family/adventure	
Crash Drive	Max Varnel	Dermot Walsh, Wendy Williams, Anton Rodgers	Drama	
The Crowning Touch	David Eady	Ted Ray, Greta Gynt, Griffith Jones	Comedy	
Danger List	Leslie Arliss	Philip Friend, Honor Blackman	Drama	Short film
Danger Within	Don Chaffey	Richard Todd, Bernard Lee, Michael Wilding	War	
The Dawn Killer	Donald Taylor	Jeremy Bulloch, Sally Bulloch	Thriller	
Deadly Record	Lawrence Huntington	Lee Patterson, Barbara Shelley, Jane Hylton	Mystery	
Desert Mice	Michael Relph	Alfred Marks, Sid James, Dora Bryan	War comedy	
The Desperate Man	Peter Maxwell	Conrad Phillips, Jill Ireland, William Hartnell	Crime	
Devil's Bait	Peter Graham Scott	Geoffrey Keen, Jane Hylton, Gordon Jackson	Drama	
The Devil's Disciple	Guy Hamilton	Burt Lancaster, Kirk Douglas, Laurence Olivier	Drama	Adaption of the play by George Bernard Shaw
Don't Panic Chaps!	George Pollock	Dennis Price, George Cole, Nadja Regin	Comedy	
Expresso Bongo	Val Guest	Laurence Harvey, Cliff Richard, Sylvia Syms	Musical	
Ferry to Hong Kong	Lewis Gilbert	Curd Jürgens, Orson Welles, Sylvia Syms	Adventure	
First Man into Space	Robert Day	Marshall Thompson, Marla Landi	Sci Fi/Horror	
Floods of Fear	Charles Crichton	Howard Keel, Anne Heywood, Cyril Cusack	Thriller	
Follow a Star	Robert Asher	Norman Wisdom, June Laverick	Comedy musical	
Friends and Neighbours	Gordon Parry	Arthur Askey, Megs Jenkins, Tilda Thamar	Comedy	
The Heart of a Man	Herbert Wilcox	Frankie Vaughan, Anne Heywood	Drama	
Hidden Homicide	Tony Young	Griffith Jones, Patricia Laffan	Mystery	
Honeymoon	Michael Powell	Anthony Steel, Ludmilla Tchérina	Drama	
Horrors of the Black Museum	Arthur Crabtree	Michael Gough, Shirley Anne Field, Geoffrey Keen	Horror	
The Hound of the Baskervilles	Terence Fisher	Peter Cushing, André Morell, Christopher Lee	Mystery	
The House of the Seven Hawks	Richard Thorpe	Robert Taylor, Nicole Maurey, Linda Christian	Mystery	
Idol on Parade	John Gilling	William Bendix, Anthony Newley, Sid James	Comedy	
I'm All Right Jack	John Boulting	Ian Carmichael, Peter Sellers, Richard Attenborough	Comedy	Number 47 in the list of BFI Top 100 British films
In the Wake of a Stranger	David Eady	Tony Wright, Shirley Eaton, Harry H. Corbett	Thriller	
Jack the Ripper	Robert S. Baker, Monty Berman	Lee Patterson, Eddie Byrne, Betty McDowall	Crime	
Jet Storm	Cy Endfield	Richard Attenborough, Stanley Baker, Diane Cilento	Thriller	
Killers of Kilimanjaro	Richard Thorpe	Robert Taylor, Anthony Newley, Anne Aubrey	African Adventure	
The Lady Is a Square	Herbert Wilcox	Anna Neagle, Frankie Vaughan, Janette Scott	Musical/romance	
Left Right and Centre	Sidney Gilliat	Ian Carmichael	Comedy/romance	
Libel	Anthony Asquith	Dirk Bogarde, Olivia de Havilland	Drama	
Life in Danger	Terry Bishop	Derren Nesbitt, Julie Hopkins	Crime	
Life in Emergency Ward 10	Robert Day	Michael Craig, Wilfrid Hyde-White	Drama	
Look Back in Anger	Tony Richardson	Richard Burton, Claire Bloom	Drama	
Make Mine a Million	Lance Comfort	Arthur Askey, Sid James	Comedy	
The Man Who Could Cheat Death	Terence Fisher	Anton Diffring, Christopher Lee	Horror	
The Man Who Liked Funerals	David Eady	Leslie Phillips, Susan Beaumont	Comedy	
Model for Murder	Terry Bishop	Keith Andes, Hazel Court	Crime	
The Mouse That Roared	Jack Arnold	Peter Sellers, Jean Seberg, William Hartnell, Leo McKern	Comedy	
The Mummy	Terence Fisher	Peter Cushing, Christopher Lee	Horror	Universal; Remake of 1932 film
Naked Fury	Charles Saunders	Reed De Rouen, Kenneth Cope	Crime	
The Navy Lark	Gordon Parry	Cecil Parker, Ronald Shiner, Leslie Phillips	Comedy	
The Night We Dropped a Clanger	Darcy Conyers	Brian Rix, Cecil Parker	Comedy	
No Trees in the Street	J. Lee Thompson	Sylvia Syms, Herbert Lom	Thriller	
North West Frontier	J. Lee Thompson	Kenneth More, Lauren Bacall	Adventure	
Operation Amsterdam	Michael McCarthy	Peter Finch, Eva Bartok	World War II Action	
Operation Bullshine	Gilbert Gunn	Donald Sinden, Barbara Murray	World War II Comedy	
Our Man in Havana	Carol Reed	Alec Guinness, Maureen O'Hara	Spy/comedy	
Please Turn Over	Gerald Thomas	Ted Ray, Leslie Phillips, Julia Lockwood	Comedy	
The Price of Silence	Montgomery Tully	Gordon Jackson, June Thorburn	Crime	
Room at the Top	Jack Clayton	Simone Signoret, Laurence Harvey, Heather Sears, Donald Wolfit	Drama	Number 32 in the list of BFI Top 100 British films; winner of two Academy Awards, three BAFTAs and an award at the 1959 Cannes Film Festival
The Rough and the Smooth	Robert Siodmak	Nadja Tiller, Tony Britton	Drama	
Sapphire	Basil Dearden	Nigel Patrick, Yvonne Mitchell	Drama	
The Scapegoat	Robert Hamer	Alec Guinness, Bette Davis	Crime	
Serious Charge	Terence Young	Anthony Quayle, Sarah Churchill	Drama	
The Shakedown	John Lemont	Terence Morgan, Hazel Court	Crime	
The Siege of Pinchgut	Harry Watt	Aldo Ray, Heather Sears	Action	Filmed in Australia; entered into the 9th Berlin International Film Festival
SOS Pacific	Guy Green	Bryan Forbes, Richard Attenborough	Thriller	
The Square Peg	John Paddy Carstairs	Norman Wisdom, Edward Chapman	World War II Comedy	
Strictly Confidential	Charles Saunders	Richard Murdoch, William Kendall	Comedy	
Subway in the Sky	Muriel Box	Van Johnson, Hildegard Knef	Crime	
Summer of the Seventeenth Doll	Leslie Norman	Ernest Borgnine, Anne Baxter	Comedy/drama	Co-production with Australia
Tarzan's Greatest Adventure	John Guillermin	Gordon Scott, Anthony Quayle, Sara Shane	African adventure	
Tiger Bay	J. Lee Thompson	John Mills, Hayley Mills, Horst Buchholz	Crime/Thriller	
Tommy the Toreador	John Paddy Carstairs	Tommy Steele, Janet Munro	Musical comedy	
Too Many Crooks	Mario Zampi	Terry-Thomas, George Cole	Comedy	
Top Floor Girl	Max Varnel	Kay Callard, Neil Hallett	Drama	
A Touch of Larceny	Guy Hamilton	James Mason, George Sanders	Comedy	
The Treasure of San Teresa	Alvin Rakoff	Eddie Constantine, Dawn Addams	Thriller	Co-production with West Germany; Also known as Hot Money Girl
The Ugly Duckling	Lance Comfort	Bernard Bresslaw, Jon Pertwee	Comedy	
Upstairs and Downstairs	Ralph Thomas	Michael Craig, Anne Heywood	Comedy	
Violent Moment	Sidney Hayers	Lyndon Brook, Jane Hylton	Drama	
Web of Evidence	Jack Cardiff	Van Johnson, Vera Miles	Thriller	
Whirlpool	Lewis Allen	Juliette Gréco, Muriel Pavlow, Marius Goring	Drama	
The Witness	Geoffrey Muller	Dermot Walsh, Greta Gynt	Crime	
A Woman's Temptation	Godfrey Grayson	Patricia Driscoll, Robert Ayres, Neil Hallett	Crime	
The Wreck of the Mary Deare	Michael Anderson	Gary Cooper, Charlton Heston, Michael Redgrave	Thriller	
Wrong Number	Vernon Sewell	Peter Reynolds, Lisa Gastoni, Olive Sloane	Crime	
Yesterday's Enemy	Val Guest	Stanley Baker, Guy Rolfe, Leo McKern	World War II	

== See also ==
- 1959 in British music
- 1959 in British television
- 1959 in the United Kingdom
