= Gustavo Perednik =

Israeli author and educator

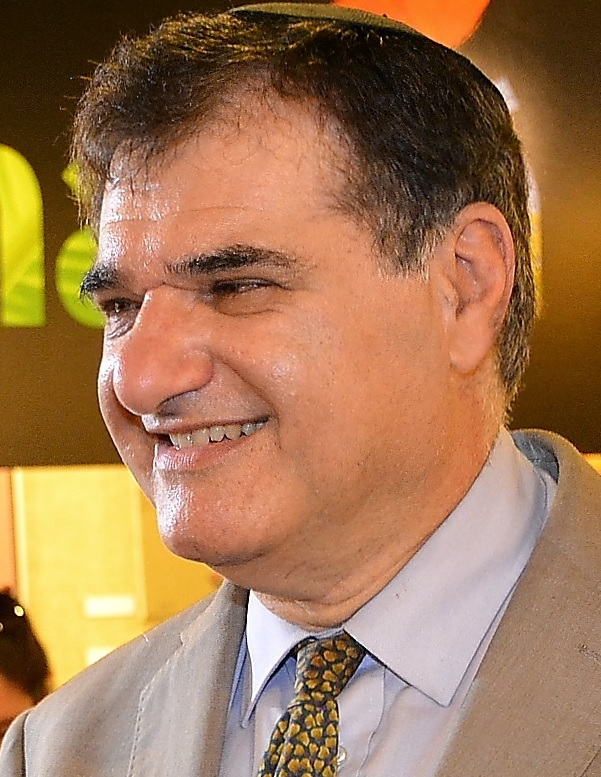
Perednik in 2018

Gustavo Daniel Perednik (Hebrew: גוסטבו דניאל פרדניק; born 1956) is an Argentinian-born Israeli author and educator.

Perednik graduated from the Universities of Buenos Aires and Jerusalem (cum laude), has a PhD in education (Universidad ORT Uruguay) and completed doctoral studies in Philosophy in New York. He took courses at the Sorbonne (France), San Marcos (Peru), and Uppsala (Sweden). He was distinguished as an outstanding lecturer at the Hebrew University of Jerusalem, where he ran the four-year, preparatory, and freshman programs. In Jerusalem, he was also Director of the Institute for Jewish Leaders from Abroad and the Sephardic Educational Centre. He ran the Ai Tian Program for Jewish Understanding in China, and the Program for Education on the Jewish Role in Civilization. He resides with his family on the outskirts of Jerusalem.

An expert on Antisemitism, or Judeophobia, Perednik was guest lecturer at more than 100 cities in 50 countries, and has published 15 books and more than 1,000 articles on Judaism and modernity. He lectures on philosophy and on the History of Zionism in the Rimonim Program of Herzog College, Israel.

== Biography ==
Perednik was born in Buenos Aires, Argentina, on October 21, 1956, the only child of Marta (1925–2001) and Samuel (1923–1994), his family fled the Russian Empire due to pogroms, thus making him a first-generation Ukrainian-Jewish-born in Argentina. He studied at the Buenos Aires English High School, and the Escuela Superior de Comercio Carlos Pellegrini.

== Community work ==
He taught in a number of Jewish institutions throughout Latin America, and founded the Centro Hebreo Yonah of Argentina, which he developed into a youth movement of 2,000 members. A member of the Sino-Judaic Institute, in 2001 he established in China the Ai Tian Program of Jewish Understanding through which he lectured in many Chinese universities and high schools. His published several essays on the relation between the Jews and the Chinese. In June 2006, after a lecturing tour in several towns of Galicia, Spain, he founded the Association of Gallegan Friends of Israel (AGAI).

== First books ==
In 1980, his novella There at the Santanders was awarded the Victoria Ocampo Literary Prize, and it was published in English in the Stories magazine of Boston in 1985. In 1982, he obtained a Jerusalem Fellows Scholarship to study in Jerusalem for a three-year period, during which he completed his MA in education at the Hebrew University (cum laude) and his doctoral studies at The Jewish Theological Seminary of New York. Perednik pursued Talmudic studies first under Rabbi Theodore Friedmann, and then at the Dvar Yerushalayim Yeshiva. He was married in 1985 to Ruth Kestenbaum, an educational psychologist from London, with whom he has five children.

Perednik's novel Achitophel, a fantasy on suicide, was published in 1988, and it received the Literary International Prize Fernando Jeno of Mexico. That year he was invited to lecture for one month in Los Angeles by the Sephardic Educational Center, and since then he has lectured in 100 cities in more than 50 countries.

In 1989, his two-volume book I am a Hebrew was published. The following year. the Hebrew University appointed him as head of the Four-Year, Freshman and Preparatory Programs, where he lectured for many years. During the 1990s, he was director of the Institute Youth Leaders from Abroad.

His essay on Judaism and Ecology was published in 1990, and received the Keren Kayemet Prize, and in 1992 his novel Lemech was published in Tel Aviv, a fictional history of WWII with Freud, Bertha Pappenheim, and Eduard Hanslick as main protagonists.

== Judeophobia and other books ==
At the Institute for Youth Leaders, Perednik created a course on Judeophobia, which he taught in several languages and was published as a book in many editions. He taught a full course on Judeophobia at several universities in Israel, Spain, and Latin America.

In 2004, he published in Barcelona Spain Derailed, with a prologue by Pilar Rahola, about Islamic terrorism and the inadequate response of the West. Since 2004, Perednik has given courses at the ORT Uruguay University on the Jewish contribution to civilization, about which he published three books. In 2008, Perednik created an exhibition on the subject, which was presented in main venues in Argentina.

His novel Darwin’s Silence was published in 2007, and it was analyzed in a doctoral thesis for the Stockholm University, Sweden. In 2009, his book To Kill Without a Trace was published, about the Iranian terror attacks in Argentina. The book was presented in a number of cities in Israel, Argentina, and Latin America. That year, Pablo Besaron published La conspiración, on Argentine literature, which includes a chapter on Perednik's novels. In 2010, a course on Perednik's novels was given at the Asociacion Argentina de Cultura Inglesa.

== Work ==
- There at the Santanders (1980)
- Achitofel (1988)
- I am a Hebrew (1989)
- Protection of Four Thousand Years – Judaism and Ecology (1990)
- Lemech (1992)
- Judeophobia (2001)
- Spain Derailed- Islamist Terror and the Awakening of the West (2004)
- Great Thinkers (2005)
- Darwin’s Silence (2006)
- Outstanding Thinkers (2006)
- Famous Thinkers (2007)
- The innovator and his environment
- Course on Judeophobia
- Program for Jewish Education
- To Kill Without a Trace (2009)
- The Motherland was a Book (2010) on the influence of the Hebrew Bible in Western Civilization
- Mankind and Chess (2012)
- Kafkania (2012)
- An Autopsy of Socialism (2013), coauthored with economist Alberto Benegas Lynch
- Sabra (2014), coauthored with Marcos Aguinis
- To Die for Argentina (2017) about the assassination of his friend Alberto Nisman
- The Return of Barbarianism (2019), coauthored with economist Alberto Benegas Lynch
- Hellenism and Hebraism - The Double Root of Western Civilization (2022)

Essays in Anthologies:

- Naïve Spanish Judeophobia, in the Jewish Political Studies Review 15:3–4, Jerusalem Center for Public Affairs, Fall 2003, pages 87–110.
- L’Espagne en Les habits neufs de l’antisemitisme en Europe, Collection Dissidence, Éditions Café Noir, Paris, 2004, pages 133–53.
- The Chinese of Jewish Descent at Kaifeng, in Alternative Orientalisms, Cambridge Scholars Publishing, UK, 2007
