= 1959 in British music =

This is a summary of 1959 in music in the United Kingdom, including the official charts from that year.

== Events ==
- January – Ealing Jazz Club opens in London.
- 21 April – Ballerina Margot Fonteyn is jailed for 24 hours in Panama on suspicion of involvement in planning a coup against the government of president Ernesto de la Guardia.
- 1 June – The first edition of Juke Box Jury, presented by David Jacobs, is broadcast on BBC television. The first panel consists of Pete Murray, Alma Cogan, Gary Miller and Susan Stranks.
- 10 June – On the opening day of a 'Pageant of Magna Carta', Benjamin Britten's Fanfare for St Edmundsbury is given its first performance in the precincts of St Edmundsbury Cathedral in Bury St Edmunds.
- 30 October – Ronnie Scott's Jazz Club opens in the Soho district of London.
- Bert Weedon becomes the first British guitarist in the UK Singles Chart with his solo "Guitar Boogie Shuffle".

== Charts ==
=== The Official UK Singles Chart ===
- See List of UK Singles Chart number ones of the 1950s

== Classical music: new works ==
- William Alwyn – Symphony No. 4
- Malcolm Arnold – Sweeney Todd (ballet)
- Arthur Bliss – Birthday Song for a Royal Child (composed to celebrate the birth of Prince Andrew
- Benjamin Britten – Missa Brevis
- Iain Hamilton – Sinfonia, for two orchestras
- Francis Jackson – Diversion for Mixtures
- Elizabeth Maconchy – "A Hymn to God the Father", for tenor and piano
- Thea Musgrave – Scottish Dance Suite, for orchestra
- Grace Williams – All Seasons Shall Be Sweet

== Film and incidental music ==
- William Alwyn – Killers of Kilimanjaro, starring Anthony Newley
- Richard Rodney Bennett – The Man Who Could Cheat Death directed by Terence Fisher, starring Anton Diffring.
- James Bernard – The Hound of the Baskervilles directed by Terence Fisher, starring Peter Cushing.
- Stanley Black – Violent Moment, starring Lyndon Brook
- Laurie Johnson
  - No Trees in the Street, starring Sylvia Syms
  - Tiger Bay, starring John Mills and Hayley Mills

== Musical theatre ==
- Wolf Mankowitz, David Heneker and Monty Norman – Make Me an Offer
- Sandy Wilson – Pieces of Eight

== Musical films ==
- Expresso Bongo, starring Laurence Harvey and Cliff Richard
- Follow a Star, starring Norman Wisdom and June Laverick
- The Lady Is a Square, starring Anna Neagle and Frankie Vaughan
- Tommy the Toreador, starring Tommy Steele

== Births ==
- 14 January – Chas Smash (Madness)
- 15 January – Pete Trewavas, bass player and songwriter
- 28 January – Dave Sharp (The Alarm)
- 3 February – Lol Tolhurst, drummer (The Cure, Presence, Easy Cure, and Levinhurst)
- 25 February – Mike Peters, singer/songwriter (The Alarm)
- 17 March – Mike Lindup, singer/keyboard player (Level 42)
- 10 April – Brian Setzer, singer/guitarist (The Stray Cats)
- 21 April – Robert Smith, singer (The Cure)
- 27 April – Sheena Easton, singer
- 5 May – Ian McCulloch, singer (Echo & the Bunnymen)
- 22 May – Morrissey, singer (The Smiths, solo)
- 28 May – Steve Strange, singer (died 2015)
- 29 May – Mel Gaynor, drummer (Simple Minds)
- 5 June – Robert Lloyd, English singer
- 19 June – Dennis Fuller, Jamaican-born singer (London Boys) (d. 1996)
- 24 June – Andy McCluskey (Orchestral Manoeuvres in the Dark)
- 28 June – Clint Boon, singer and keyboard player (Inspiral Carpets and The Clint Boon Experience)
- 30 June – Brendan Perry, singer-songwriter, guitarist, and producer (Dead Can Dance and The Scavengers)
- 1 July – Edem Ephraim, singer (London Boys) (d. 1996)
- 9 July – Jim Kerr, singer (Simple Minds)
- 16 July – James MacMillan, composer
- 18 July – Jonathan Dove, composer
- 5 August – Pete Burns, singer (Dead or Alive) (d. 2016)
- 6 August – Donna Lewis, singer
- 29 August – Eddi Reader, singer
- 24 September – Drummie Zeb, singer (Aswad) (d. 2022)
- 4 October – Chris Lowe, keyboard player (Pet Shop Boys)
- 10 October
  - Kirsty MacColl, singer/songwriter (d. 2000)
  - Steve Martland, composer, curator Factory Classical (d. 2013)
- 7 November – Richard Barrett, composer
- 27 November – Charlie Burchill, guitarist (Simple Minds)
- 1 December – Billy Childish, artist and musician
- 30 December – Tracey Ullman, actress and singer
- date unknown
  - Paul Coletti, Scottish viola soloist and chamber musician
  - John Palmer, composer, pianist and musicologist.
  - Andi Spicer, electroacoustic composer (d.2020)

== Deaths ==
- 11 March – Haydn Wood, violinist and composer (born 1882)
- 25 March – Billy Mayerl, pianist and composer (born 1902)
- 9 June – Sonnie Hale, actor and singer (born 1902)
- 6 September – Kay Kendall, musical comedy actress (born 1926) (leukaemia)
- 11 September – Ann Drummond-Grant, operatic contralto (born 1905)
- 21 September – Agnes Nicholls, operatic soprano (born 1877)
- 28 September – Gerard Hoffnung, German-born artist, musician and humorist (born 1925) (cerebral haemorrhage)
- 19 October – Stanley Bate, pianist and composer (born 1911) (suicide)
- 26 November – Albert Ketèlbey, pianist, conductor and composer (born 1875)
- 29 December – Robin Milford, composer (born 1903)
- 30 December – G. W. Briggs, hymn-writer (born 1875)

== See also ==
- 1959 in British television
- 1959 in the United Kingdom
- List of British films of 1959
