= David Morgan (journalist) =

British journalist, born 1959

David Morgan (11 October 1959, Toronto – 1 September 2016) was a Northern Irish television presenter and journalist. He worked at the Irish News, BBC NI, and UTV (where he began his career in 2001) before ending his career as news editor at Citybeat.

Morgan was married and had one son.
