= Ian Arkwright =

Professional footballer

Personal information
- Date of birth: 18 September 1959 (age 67)
- Place of birth: Shafton, Barnsley, England
- Position: Winger

Youth career
- Wolverhampton Wanderers

Senior career*
Years	Team	Apps	(Gls)
1978	HIK	?	(?)
1978–1979	Wolverhampton Wanderers	4	(0)
1979–1984	Wrexham	104	(10)
1984	→ Torquay United (loan)	2	(0)
1984–1988	Finn Harps	65	(6)
- * Club domestic league appearances and goals

Ian Arkwright (born 18 September 1959) is an English former professional footballer who played in the Football League for Wolverhampton Wanderers, Wrexham and Torquay United. He played as a winger, and the majority of his League career was spent with Wrexham in the early 1980s.

== Career ==
Arkwright was born in Shafton, Barnsley, and began his career as an apprentice with Wolverhampton Wanderers, turning professional in September 1977. He failed to establish himself at Wolves however, and played just four times in total. His debut was as a substitute in a 1–0 win over Queens Park Rangers on 30 September 1978, but after starting the next three games, never featured for the first team again.

He was transferred to Wrexham for a fee of £100,000 in March 1980. In four years at the Racecourse Ground, he made 104 league appearances, scoring 10 goals. Towards the end of his time at Wrexham and of his league career, in March 1984, he played two games on loan to Torquay United, away to Chesterfield and at home to Mansfield Town.

He also plied his trade in foreign leagues, joining Finn Harps in Ireland (8 goals in 94 total appearances) and HIK in Finland.
