= Liz Howe =

British ecologist and herpetologist (1959–2019)

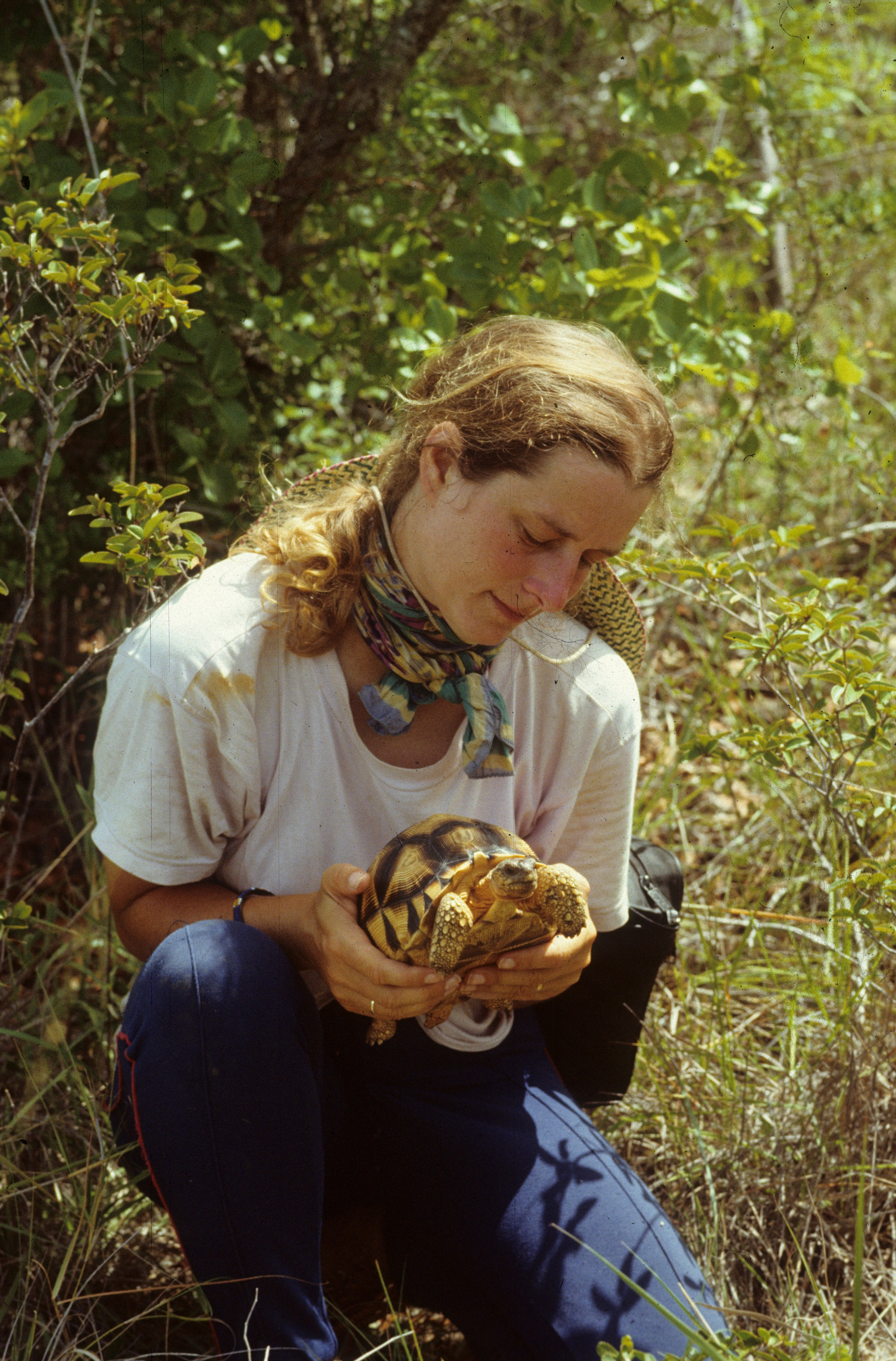
- Liz Howe in Madagascar, with an angonoka (or ploughshare) tortoise, Astrochelys yniphora.
- Born: 27 October 1959; Kingstanding, West Midlands, England
- Died: 31 March 2019 (aged 59); Bangor, Gwynedd, Wales
- Education: Queen Elizabeth College; Bangor University
- Scientific career
- Fields: ecology, conservation, herpetology
- Workplaces: Nature Conservancy Council; Countryside Council for Wales; Natural Resources Wales

Liz Howe (27 October 1959 - 31 March 2019) was a British ecologist and herpetologist. She is best known as one of the coordinators of a comprehensive field survey of the natural habitats of Wales, published in 2010.

== Early life and education ==
She was born Elizabeth Anne Pulford on 27 October 1959 in Kingstanding, West Midlands, England, daughter of Robert Pulford, an electrical engineer, and his wife, Margaret Davis. After attending Aldridge grammar school in Walsall she did an undergraduate degree at Queen Elizabeth College, University of London, where she won the Cheesman Prize for her studies of mammalian physiology. Her Ph.D. was awarded in 1985 from Bangor University for her work on the physiology of the ocellated skink, a lizard found in Italy, Greece and Malta.

== Career ==
After her Ph.D., she spent three decades working for the Nature Conservancy Council and its successor organizations in Wales, the Countryside Council for Wales and Natural Resources Wales. During this time she managed teams mapping vegetation throughout Wales, which was published in the book Habitats of Wales: A Comprehensive Field Survey, 1979-1997. This has since been widely used as an evidence base for conservation management and for identifying potential Sites of Special Scientific Interest. As a herpetologist she led reintroduction programs to conserve threatened species such as sand lizards and natterjack toads. She also reviewed the ecology and distributions of reptiles and amphibians in the book A New Natural History of Anglesey. In her private time she and her husband restored a rare section of limestone pavement on their small holding near Marianglas, Anglesey, which was declared a Site of Special Scientific Interest shortly before her death.

== Personal life ==
Howe was an accomplished amateur flautist who promoted provision of music among young people. She was a committee member and secretary for the Friends of Gwynedd Youth Music and secretary for the Beaumaris Brass Band, for which she played euphonium.

== Publications ==
- Stubbs, D., Hailey, A., & Pulford, E. (1984). Thermal Relations of Testudo hermanni robertmertensi WERMUTH in S. France. Amphibia-Reptilia, 5(1): 37-41.
- Stubbs, D., Hailey, A., Pulford, E. & Tyler, W. (1984). Population ecology of European tortoises: review of field techniques. Amphibia-Reptilia, 5(1): 57-68.
- Pulford, E. A., Hailey, A., & Stubbs, D. (1984). Summer Activity Patterns of Testudo hermanni GMELIN in Greece and France. Amphibia-Reptilia, 5(1): 69-78.
- Stubbs, D., Swingland, I., Hailey, A. & Pulford, E. (1985). The ecology of the Mediterranean tortoise Testudo hermanni in northern Greece (the effects of a catastrophe on population structure and density). Biological Conservation, 31(2): 125-152.
- Pulford, E.A. (1985). Aspects of reproduction & behaviour in the lizard Chalcides ocellatus. Ph.D. thesis. University of North Wales, Bangor.
- Howe, E. (1990). Chapter 7. Amphibians of Anglesey. pp. 93–101. In: A New Natural History of Anglesey. Jones, W.E. (Ed.), Anglesey Antiquarian Society, Llangefni.
- Howe, E. (1990). Chapter 8. Reptiles of Anglesey. pp. 102–108. In: A New Natural History of Anglesey. Jones, W.E. (Ed.), Anglesey Antiquarian Society, Llangefni.
- Howe, M. & Howe, E. (1992). Flies of North Wales, Number 1. Soldier Flies. North Wales Invertebrate Group Newsletter No. 5: 3.
- Howe, M. & Howe, L. (1995). Flies of North Wales. Part Two – Conopids. North Wales Invertebrate Group Newsletter No. 12: 5-6.
- Howe, M.A. & Howe, E.A. (1995). The soldier fly Stratiomys chamaeleon on Anglesey and the Black Isle. Dipterists Digest. 2: 24-28.
- Blackstock, T.H., Stevens, J.P., Howe, E.A. & Stevens, D.P. (1995). Changes in the extent and fragmentation of heathland and other semi-natural habitats between 1920–22 and 1987-88 in the Llyn peninsula, Wales, UK. Biological Conservation. 72: 33-44.
- Blackstock, T.H., Stevens, D.P. & Howe, E.A. (1996). Biological components of Sites of Special Scientific Interest in Wales. Biodiversity and Conservation. 5: 897-920.
- Howe, M.A. & Howe, E.A. (2000). Two recent records of the cranefly Symplecta novaezemblae scotica (Edwards) (Diptera, Limoniidae), including a first for Wales. Dipterists Digest. 7: 23.
- Howe, M.A., Howe, E.A. & Skidmore, P. (2000). Recent records of Orchisia costata (Diptera, Muscidae) from Dorset and Wiltshire. Dipterists Digest. 7: 8.
- Howe, E.A., Howe, M.A. & Bratton, J.H. (2000). Paraclusia tigrina (Fallén, 1820) (Diptera, Clusiidae) in Caernarvonshire and Anglesey. Dipterists Digest. 7: 80.
- Howe, M.A., Parker, M.J. & Howe, E.A. (2001). A review of the Dipterists Forum summer field meeting in Dorset, 1998. Dipterists Digest. 8: 135-148.
- Howe, M.A. & Howe, E.A. (2001). Recent records of scarce tachinid flies (Diptera, Tachinidae) in England and Scotland. Dipterists Digest. 8: 6.
- Howe, M.A. & Howe, E.A. (2001). Recent records of Cyrtophleba ruricola (Meigen) and Policheta unicolor (Fallen) (Diptera, Tachinidae) from Wales and England. Dipterists Digest. 8: 17.
- Howe, M.A. & Howe, E.A. (2001). A review of the Dipterists Forum summer field meeting at Abergavenny, 1997. Dipterists Digest. 8: 31-48.
- Howe, M.A. & Howe, E.A. (2001). The rediscovery of the silverfly Acrometopia wahlbergi (Diptera, Chamaemyiidae) at Cliburn Moss. The Carlisle Naturalist. 9: 4-5.
- Jones, P.S., Stevens, D.P., Blackstock, T.H., Burrows, C.R. & Howe, E.A. (2003). Priority Habitats of Wales: a technical guide. Countryside Council for Wales, Bangor.
- Blackstock, T. & Howe, L. (2003). The habitat survey of Wales. Natur Cymru. 6: 4-8.
- Stevens, J.P., Blackstock, T.H., Howe, E.A. & Stevens, D.P. (2004). Repeatability of Phase I habitat survey. Journal of Environmental Management, 73(1): 53-9.
- Howe, M.A. & Howe, E.A. (2005). Some recent records of parasitic Hymenoptera in Wales. Entomologist's Monthly Magazine. 141: 247-248.
- Howe, L., Blackstock, T., Burrows, C. & Stevens, J. (2005). The Habitat Survey of Wales. British Wildlife. 16: 153-162.
- Askew, R.R., Howe, M.A. & Howe, E.A. (2006). Some observations on Perilampus aureoviridis Walker (Hym., Chalcidoidea, Perilampidae) in Britain. Entomologist's Monthly Magazine. 142: 151-154.
- Howe, M.A. & Howe, E.A. (2006). Recent records of scarce tachinid flies (Diptera, Tachinidae) from England and Wales. Dipterists Digest. 13: 95-96.
- Howe, M.A. & Howe, E.A. (2006). The current status and distribution of Acrometopia wahlbergi (Zetterstedt, 11846) (Diptera, Chamaemyiidae) in Britain. Dipterists Digest. 13: 169-171.
- Howe, M.A. & Howe, E.A. (2006). Parochthiphila spectabilis (Loew, 1858) (Diptera, Chamaemyiidae) on the Isle of Wight. Dipterists Digest. 13: 171-172.
- Blackstock, T.H., Burrows, Clare, Howe, E.A. & Stevens, J.P. (2007). Habitat inventory at a regional scale: A comparison of estimates of terrestrial Broad Habitat cover from stratified sample field survey and full census field survey for Wales, UK. Journal of Environmental Management 85(1): 224-3.
- Bratton, J., Howe, M.A. & Howe, E.A. (2008). The spurge bug Dicranocephalus agilis (Scopoli) reaches Anglesey. Journal of the Lancashire & Cheshire Entomological Society. 130: 39-41.
- Howe, M.A. & Howe, E.A. (2008). A review of significant entomological records for North Wales (VC47 to 52) in 2006. Journal of the Lancashire & Cheshire Entomological Society. 130: 111-118.
- Blackstock, T.H., Howe, E.A., Stevens, J.P., Burrows, C.R. & Jones, P.S. (2010). Habitats of Wales: A Comprehensive Field Survey, 1979-1997. University of Wales Press.
- Howe, M.A. & Howe, E.A. (2010). A review of significant entomological records for North Wales (VC47 to 52) in 2007. Journal of the Lancashire & Cheshire Entomological Society. 131 & 132: 85-91.
- Howe, E.A. (2011). The application of Phase 1 level survey data for the conservation of Welsh habitats. In T.H. Blackstock, E.A. Howe, J.P. Rothwell, C.A. Duigan & P.S. Jones (Editors), Proceedings of a memorial conference for Dr. David Paul Stevens 1958-2007, Grassland Ecologist and Conservationist. CCW Staff Science Report No: 10/03/05, 168pp, Countryside Council for Wales, Bangor.
- Mitchell, R.J., Bailey, S., Beaton, J.K., Bellamy, P.E., Brooker, R.W., Broome, A., Chetcuti, J., Eaton, S., Ellis, C.J., Farren, J., Gimona, A., Goldberg, E., Hall, J., Harmer, R., Hester, A.J., Hewison, R.L., Hodgetts, N.G., Hooper, R.J., Howe, L., Iason, G.R., Kerr, G., Littlewood, N.A., Morgan, V., Newey, S., Potts, J.M., Pozsgai, G., Ray, D., Sim, D.A., Stockan, J.A., Taylor, A.F.S. & Woodward, S. (2014). The potential ecological impact of ash dieback in the UK. JNCC Report No. 483. Joint Nature Conservation Committee, Peterborough.
