= Herman Aguinis =

American researcher and author (born 1966)

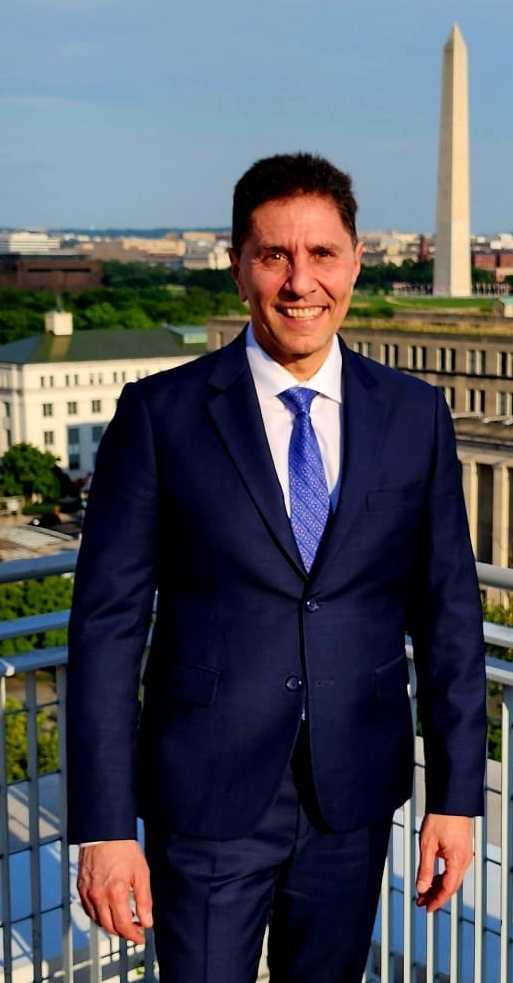
- Born: Herman Aguinis; 1966 (age 59–60); Río Cuarto, Córdoba, Argentina
- Education: University of Buenos Aires; University at Albany
- Occupations: Researcher; Professor; Author
- Spouse: Heidi Roth-Aguinis
- Children: 2
- Relatives: Marcos Aguinis
- Writing career
- Language: English; Spanish; French
- Subjects: Talent & Performance management Corporate social responsibility Organizational research methods
- Notable awards: Losey Award for lifetime contributions by SHRM Foundation; Lifetime Scientific Contributions Award by Society for Industrial and Organizational Psychology and Academy of Management
- Website: www.hermanaguinis.com

Herman Aguinis (born 1966) is an Argentine‑American management scholar whose work focuses on organizational behavior, human resource management, and research methods. He is the Avram Tucker Distinguished Scholar and a professor of management at the George Washington University School of Business.

== Early life and education ==
Herman Aguinis was born in Rio Cuarto, Cordoba, Argentina. He is the son of the Argentine author Marcos Aguinis and University of Buenos Aires School of Law professor Ana Maria "Marita" Aguinis. He attended high school at the Colegio Nacional de Buenos Aires before receiving Bachelor's and Master's degrees in psychology from the University of Buenos Aires. He spent part of his high school years in New York City. Following his schooling in Argentina, he moved to the United States to study Industrial and Organizational Psychology, earning a Master's and then a PhD from the University at Albany, State University of New York in 1993.

== Career ==
Aguinis' academic work focuses on organizational behavior, human resource management, and research methodology. His published research has examined topics including employee performance, corporate social responsibility, workforce diversity, workplace leadership, staffing, training and development, performance management, as well as quantitative and methodological approaches used in organizational research. He served as editor-in-chief of Organizational Research Methods from 2005 to 2007, and has been a member of the editorial boards of Journal of Applied Psychology, Personnel Psychology, Journal of Management, and Journal of International Business Studies.

As a scholar, he had been taught in the University Of Albany, University of Buenos Aires, and the National College of Buenos Aires.

Aguinis has been elected a fellow of the Academy of Management, the American Psychological Association, and the Association for Psychological Science. He has also received career and lifetime contribution awards from the Society for Human Resource Management, Society for Industrial and Organizational Psychology, and the Academy of Management.

== Selected publications ==
=== Books ===
- Aguinis, H. 2025. Public policy implications of entrepreneurship research. Sage Publications
- Aguinis, H. 2025. Research methodology: best practices for rigorous, credible, and impactful research. Thousand Oaks, CA: SAGE. ISBN 978-1071871942, 9781071871928.
- Cascio, W.F., & Aguinis, H. 2025. Applied psychology in talent management (9th ed.). Thousand Oaks, CA: SAGE. ISBN 9781071912058, 9781071912089.
- Aguinis, H. 2019. Performance management for dummies. Hoboken, NJ: Wiley. ISBN 978-1119557654.
- Aguinis, H. 2023. Performance management (5th ed.). Chicago, IL: Chicago Business Press. ISBN 978-1-948426-48-0.
- Aguinis, H. 2004. Regression analysis for categorical moderators. New York, NY: Guilford. ISBN 1572309695.
- Baruch, Y., Konrad, A.M., Aguinis, H., & Starbuck, W.H. (Eds.). 2008. Opening the black box of editorship. New York, NY: Palgrave-Macmillan. ISBN 0230013600.
- Aguinis, H. (Ed.). 2004. Test-score banding in human resource selection: Legal, technical, and societal issues. Westport, CT: Praeger. ISBN 1567205208.

=== Journal articles ===
- Bradley, Kyle J.; Aguinis, Herman (2023). "Team Performance: Nature and Antecedents of Non-normal Distributions". Organization Science. 34 (3): 1266–1286. doi:10.1287/orsc.2022.1619.
- Aguinis, Herman; Gabriel, Kelly P. (2022). "International Business Studies: Are We Really So Uniquely Complex?". Journal of International Business Studies. 53 (9): 2023–2036. doi:10.1057/s41267-021-00462-x.
- Aguinis, Herman; Solarino, Angelo (2019). "Transparency and Replicability in Qualitative Research: The Case of Interviews with Elite Informants". Strategic Management Journal. 40 (8): 1291–1315. Bibcode:2019SManJ..40.1291A. doi:10.1002/smj.3015.
- Aguinis, Herman; Glavas, Ante (March 2019). "On Corporate Social Responsibility, Sensemaking, and the Search for Meaningfulness Through Work". Journal of Management. 45 (3): 1057–1086. doi:10.1177/0149206317691575. S2CID 151866348.
- Aguinis, Herman; Ji, Young Hun; Joo, Harry (December 2018). "Gender productivity gap among star performers in STEM and other scientific fields". Journal of Applied Psychology. 103 (12): 1283–1306. doi:10.1037/apl0000331. PMID 30024197.
- Aguinis, Herman; Ramani, Ravi S.; Alabduljader, Nawaf (January 2018). "What You See Is What You Get? Enhancing Methodological Transparency in Management Research". Academy of Management Annals. 12 (1): 83–110. doi:10.5465/annals.2016.0011.
- Aguinis, Herman; O'Boyle, Ernest (June 2014). "Star Performers in Twenty-First Century Organizations". Personnel Psychology. 67 (2): 313–350. doi:10.1111/peps.12054.
- Aguinis, Herman; Joo, Harry; Gottfredson, Ryan K. (November 2011). "Why we hate performance management—And why we should love it". Business Horizons. 54 (6): 503–507. doi:10.1016/j.bushor.2011.06.001.
