= Denis Mitchell (filmmaker) =

British filmmaker (1911–1990)

Denis Mitchell (11 August 1911 – 1990) was a British documentary filmmaker, known for his radio and television documentaries. His radio and television career can broadly be characterised by the constant interest Mitchell displayed in "giving voice to the voiceless" and in the rhythms and prosody of everyday vernacular speech.

== Early life in Britain and South Africa ==
The son of a Congregationalist minister, Mitchell was born in Cheshire, and his family moved from one church community to another throughout his childhood. After some time spent at RADA pursuing an unsuccessful attempt to become an actor, at the age of 18 he moved to South Africa, the country his parents had emigrated to several years previously. At the outbreak of war he joined the South African Army, first in the artillery, and later in Cairo, where he attained the rank of captain, and organising entertainment for the troops from visiting celebrities such as Bob Hope and Noël Coward.

On demobilisation, he gained a job with the South African Broadcasting Corporation (SABC) as a writer-producer. Mitchell began to develop an interest in recording equipment, after experimenting with wire-recorders which had been left by the American army. He used the equipment to record interviews with agricultural workers, and this led him to the revelation that entire radio programmes could be based on recorded speech, and that "the ability to record people talking at their jobs and in their homes was not a mere novelty but a most important new means of communication."

== BBC Radio career ==
In 1949, the SABC invited the radio producer D.G. Bridson to spend a year in South Africa. He befriended Mitchell and suggested to him that he should come back to Britain to work in Laurence Gilliam's Features Department, alongside such poetic talent as Louis MacNeice and Dylan Thomas.

After a brief period in the Features Department in London, Mitchell joined the BBC North Region in Manchester in 1950, becoming a Features Producer in succession to Norman Swallow, who would later become Mitchell's close friend and collaborator. After producing several radio series' based on British and American folk, blues and jazz music (including Ballads and Blues) with musicians including Alan Lomax, Ewan MacColl and Big Bill Broonzy, Mitchell initiated the occasional series, People Talking, which ran between 1953 and 1958. These programmes were based on the lives and words of ordinary people, forsaking narration and commentary. The routine manner by which the working classes were then represented was usually subject to heavy mediation, in scripting and programme presentation. Mitchell took the portable tape recorder, which had just come 'on stream' in the BBC, out to the streets, pubs, clubs, hostels and boarding-houses of the North, recording many hours of unscripted and spontaneous speech, which he then edited into radio features.

== Television documentaries ==
In 1955, Mitchell was sent on a training attachment to the BBC's Lime Grove Studios, where he worked on his first television documentary, a 15-minute contribution to an edition of the pioneering current affairs Special Enquiry, about teenagers. His idea was to combine extracts from tape-recordings as the basis of the film's soundtrack (a style known as wild track), for which he then found accompanying non-synchronous images. This was the basis of 'the Mitchell style', which he would refine during the rest of his work for the BBC. The 'Teenagers' film was enthusiastically received (not least by filmmaker Karel Reisz) for its technical experimentation and impressionist portraiture of everyday life. This led to Mitchell's first television feature for the BBC in 1957, In Prison. This was the first film to be shot inside a prison in Britain – Manchester's Strangeways – during the making of which Mitchell spent a month in a prison cell.

In Prison was the first of several adaptations for television of radio features from the People Talking series. Others included Night in the City (1957), On Tour (1958), Morning in the Streets (1959) and Soho Story (1959). For Morning in the Streets, made by the BBC's Northern Film Unit, Mitchell and his 'camera team' (Roy Harris and Gerry Pullen) used the lightweight 16mm camera, which afforded greater mobility, allowing the film to get closer to the 'texture' of everyday life. This film, which won the Prix Italia, was an atmospheric impression of life and opinion in the back streets of an unnamed Northern city during the morning hours, and featured amusing and moving vignettes of working-class life (shot in Liverpool, Manchester, Salford and Stockport).

After travelling abroad to make the award-winning and controversial Chicago (1961, researched by Studs Terkel) and his South-African trilogy (1960), Denis Mitchell tutored recent Oxford graduate Dennis Potter in documentary filmmaking, resulting in the 1960 documentary Between Two Rivers, which Potter wrote and appeared in.

Mitchell then left the BBC to form the first independent production company, Denis Mitchell Films, with friend and colleague Norman Swallow. Mitchell made films for ATV and Rediffusion, and then in 1964 he and Swallow joined Granada Television. For Granada they made the first documentaries to be shot on videotape, which represented a challenge, as it necessitated bulky equipment and was difficult to edit. Nevertheless, in 1964 they made The Entertainers, temporarily banned by the ITA for a brief shot of a topless dancer, and A Wedding on A Saturday, a memorable evocation of a Northern mining community, which won the Prix Italia that year. As part of their contract at Granada, Mitchell and Swallow executive-produced the series This England. The series, which documented various aspects of regional English culture, ran from 1965 to 1967, and provided essential training for new directors, such as Dick Fontaine, Mike Grisgby, Michael Apted and Mike Newell.

After This England Mitchell's reputation for innovation began to wane (he was by that time in his late fifties), yet he continued to make documentary films on a wide variety of themes for all the major television companies. In 1977, he made his final major work, Never and Always, a study of rural life in Norfolk, with its seasonal, cyclical changes.

== Recent revivals ==
After his death in 1990, there were retrospectives both on BBC TV, and at the National Film Theatre. Morning in the Streets was screened in 2007 to mark Liverpool's status as 'Capital of Culture'.

On 25 March 2009, the exact 50th anniversary of the transmission of Morning in the Streets, a one-day retrospective was held at Lighthouse, Poole's Centre for the Arts.
