= Ruth Perednik =

Israeli psychologist (born 1959)

- רות פרדניק
- Born: Ruth Kestenbaum; October 24, 1959 (age 66); London, England
- Occupation: Psychologist
- Known for: Research on selective mutism
- Spouse: Gustavo Perednik
- Children: 5

Academic background
- Education: Hebrew University of Jerusalem
- Thesis: Selective Mutism in Immigrant Families (2002)
- Doctoral advisor: Yoel Elizur

Ruth Perednik (née Kestenbaum, Hebrew: רות פרדניק; born 24 October 1959) is an English-born Israeli psychologist, pioneer in the field of selective mutism.

== Biography ==
Ruth Perednik was born in London. She graduated from University College London (1983) and the Institute of Education, University of London (1984) and the Hebrew University of Jerusalem (Educational Psychology, 2002). Her thesis in England was on The Relation Between Mothers’ Attentiveness to Toddlers and Child’s Attachment to Mother and in Israel she completed her thesis on Selective Mutism in Immigrant Families, under the supervision of Prof. Yoel Elizur, with a grant from the Martin and Vivian Levin Center for the Development of the Child and Adolescent. Ruth Perednik taught at the Lincoln School, and at the Yehuda Halevi Teacher’s Training College, Argentina (1986–1987), where she lectured on Educational Psychology. She resides in the outskirts of Jerusalem with her husband, Gustavo Perednik; they have five children.

== Expertise ==
Ruth Perednik has been specializing in the treatment of children with Selective Mutism and other anxiety disorders over the past 30 years. She has developed a treatment method for Selective Mutism based on cognitive behavioral techniques, in the framework of her work in the Jerusalem Psychological Services in the Jerusalem Municipality. Perednik heads a treatment clinic for children with Selective Mutism. She lectures and trains parents and therapists in Europe, the Americas and Asia. She has developed a Selective Mutism treatment manual which has been published in English and Chinese. She also published a Hebrew language treatment manual together with Professor Yoel Elitzur, of the Hebrew University.

The innovative element of Perednik’s treatment method is treating the child or teen in his natural environment (home and school sessions), and not in a clinic setting, since this is where the symptoms of the selective mutism hit hard and must be alleviated. This was considered iconoclastic when Perednik first published her treatment method, yet it has become generally accepted, and is the treatment of choice in several international selective mutism treatment centers. Perednik advocates for accountability of therapists when treating children, so that evidence-based interventions are the treatments of choice, facilitating effective therapy.

== Publications ==
- Prevalence and Description of Selective Mutism in Immigrant and Native Families: A Controlled Study Journal of the American Academy of Child & Adolescent Psychiatry, 42 (12): 1451–1459. doi:10.1097/00004583-200312000-00012. PMID 14627880.
- Still Waters Run Deep – The Selective Mutism Treatment Guide: Manuals for Parents, Teachers and Therapists, 2010.
