= Morning in the Streets =

1959 film by Denis Mitchell

- Directed by: Denis Mitchell; Roy Harris
- Written by: Frank Shaw (research)
- Cinematography: Roy Harris; Gerry Pullen, Graham Turner, Ted Wallbank
- Edited by: Donald James
- Music by: Thomas Henderson; Melos Ensemble; Tommy Reilly (Harmonica)
- Distributed by: BBC Northern Films Unit
- Release date: 25 March 1959
- Running time: 35 minutes
- Country: United Kingdom
- Language: English

Morning in the Streets is a 1959 BBC television documentary directed by Denis Mitchell and Roy Harris. It was produced by the BBC Northern Film Unit and was first broadcast on 25 March 1959.

The documentary was described simply as "an impression of life and opinion in the back streets of a northern city in the morning". It is an impressionistic slice-of-life documentary, featuring footage of working-class people and street scenes, accompanied by a montage soundtrack of voices conveying opinions and philosophies on life. The film was researched by a writer on Liverpool life and dialect, Frank Shaw.

The music was specially composed by Thomas Henderson and Liverpool songwriter Stan Kelly, and featured the harmonica of classical musician Tommy Reilly.

== The Talking Streets ==
The Talking Streets was a radio feature produced by Denis Mitchell for the BBC North Region, as part of his People Talking series, and broadcast on 27 October 1958. The programme was a kaleidoscope of voices, sounds and stories recorded by Mitchell using a portable tape recorder. These recordings provided the inspiration and the basis of the soundtrack for Morning in the Streets.

== Revivals ==
The film was shown on BBC Four in 2008 as part of the Liverpool on the Box season to coincide with the city being European Capital of Culture, and again in September 2010. It was then further repeated in July 2011 on BBC Four as part of the "Britain through a Lens" season.c
