= Marcos Aguinis =

Argentine writer

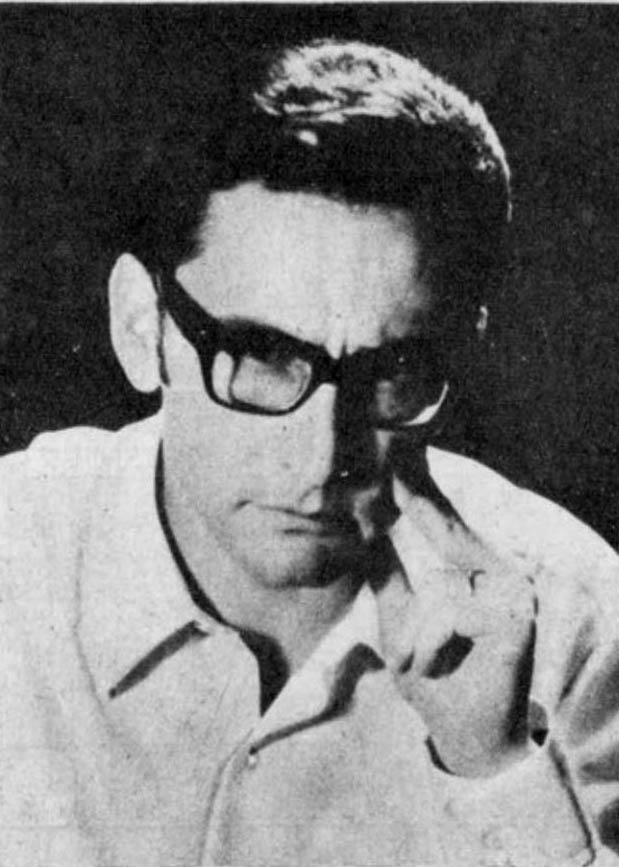
- Born: January 13, 1935 (age 91); Cruz Del Eje Cordoba Province, Argentina
- Education: National University of Cordoba, Argentina; Pitié-Salpêtrière Hospital, Paris, France; University of Freiburg, Freiburg, Germany
- Writing career
- Notable awards: Planeta Prize; Spain 1970 Doctor Honoris Causa Tel Aviv University; 2002; Doctor Honoris Causa Hebrew University of Jerusalem; 2010 Public Policy Scholar Woodrow Wilson International Center for Scholars
- Website: aguinis.net

Marcos Aguinis (born 13 January 1935) is an Argentine writer. Trained in medical studies, music and psychoanalysis, his work and his thoughts are focused on the notions of independence, democracy and rejection of authoritarianism. He is a proponent of political liberalism, and participates in seminars and conferences from the Freedom Foundation organized by Mario Vargas Llosa. He is the father of business professor, researcher, and author Herman Aguinis.

== Background ==
Aguinis was born in Cruz del Eje, Córdoba, Argentina on January 13, 1935. He is an author with extensive international training in literature, neurosurgery, psychoanalysis, the arts and history. "I have traveled the world, but I have also traveled across different professions." The son of Jewish immigrants, he was seven years old when the news came that the Nazis had killed his grandfather and the rest of his family that had remained in Europe. He describes this as the foundational moment of his life, and one that ultimately drove him to write in an effort to close that wound, to repair the "broken mechanism of humanity".

He published his first book in 1963, and since then he has written fourteen novels, seventeen essay collections, four short story collections, and two biographies. Most of them have become bestsellers and have generated enthusiasm and controversy. Mr. Aguinis was the first author outside of Spain to receive the prestigious Planeta Award for his book "La Cruz Invertida" and his bestselling novel "Against the Inquisition (La Gesta del Marrano)" has been translated to several languages and praised by Nobel Prize Laureate Mario Vargas Llosa as a "stirring song of freedom". He has written articles on a wide variety of topics for Latin American, U.S. and European newspapers and magazines. Marcos Aguinis has given hundreds of lectures and seminars at educational, artistic, scientific and political organizations in Germany, Spain, the United States, Israel, Russia, Italy and practically every Latin American country.

When democracy was reinstated in Argentina in December 1983, Marcos Aguinis was designated Vice-secretary and, eventually, Secretary of Culture; in this capacity, he sponsored the renowned "cultural renaissance" that inspired the country at the time. He created the National Program for Democratization of Culture (PRONDEC), sponsored by UNESCO and the United Nations. Mr. Aguinis promoted strong actions towards participation activities aimed at raising individual awareness of the rights, duties and potentialities that a true democracy fosters. His work was recognized with two nominations for the UNESCO Education for Peace Award.

In the field of human rights, he risked his life by courageously addressing controversial issues. During the last dictatorship, the circulation of his books was restricted, but some of them were successfully smuggled. Many of his readers admire his prophetic vision of the Arab-Israeli conflict, the internal struggles within the Catholic Church, the authoritarian political trends, and the resurgence of ethnic and religious fundamentalism.

Marcos Aguinis, has received, among others, the Premio Planeta (Spain), Fernando Jeno Award (Mexico), Meritorious Award for Culture of the Academy of Arts and Communication Sciences, National Award for Sociology, Hispanic Literature and Culture Institute of California Award (USA), National Book Award, Argentina Society of Writers Honor Award, Pranavananda Swami Award, the Annual Silver Plaque EFE Agency for his contribution to the strengthening of Latin American culture and language, Esteban Echeverría Award (Free People), J. Award B. Alberdi (Hispanic American Center for Economic Research) and was appointed by France Chevalier of Arts and Letters. He was awarded the title of Doctor Honoris Causa of Tel Aviv University (2002), the Hebrew University of Jerusalem (2010) and he was named a Distinguished Writer in Residence at the American University in Washington, D.C. and Public Policy Scholar by the Wilson Center (Washington, USA). In 1995 Argentina's Writers Society conferred on him the Grand Prize of Honor for his work.

== Full bibliography ==
=== Short stories ===
- Operation Siesta (1977)
- And the Fruitful Branch(1986)
- Importance by Contact (1986)
- All the Stories (1995)

=== Biographies ===
- Maimónides (1963)
- The Perpetual Battle (1971)

=== Novels ===
- Refugees: A Palestinian's Chronicle (1969)
- The Inverted Cross (1970)
- Cantata of the Devils (1972)
- A Conspiracy of Idiots (1978)
- Defilement of Love (1978)
- Against the Inquisition (1991) - (In English: Amazon Publishing 2018)
- The Fount of Hell(1997)
- The Enlightened Ones (2000)
- Assault on Paradise (2002)
- The Passion according to Carmela (2008) (In English: Amazon Publishing 2018)
- The Young Liova (2011)
- Evita's Fury (2013)
- Sabra, Alone against an Empire (2014) Co-author: Gustavo Perednik
- The Novel of my Life (2016)
- Populism's Mistress (2022)

=== Essays ===
- Letter to a hopeful General (1983)
- The Courage of Writing (1985)
- Argentina: A Fantastic Country (1988)
- Memories of Sowing Time (1990)
- Guilt: A Eulogy (1993)
- New Hopeful Letter to a General (1996)
- Dialogues about Argentina and the End of the Millennium (1996)
- New Dialogues (1998)
- The Atrocious Charm of Being Argentine (2001)
- The Coachman (2001)
- Doubts and Certainties (2001)
- Net of Hate (2003)
- What to Do? Fundamentals for the Argentinean Renaissance (2005)
- The Atrocious Charm of Being Argentine 2 (2007)
- My Poor Country! (2009)*
- Pleasure: A Eulogy (2010)
- Ideas on Fire (2017)

=== Books About Marcos Aguinis ===
- López-Calvo, Ignacio. Religion and Militarism in Marcos Aguinis's Work 1963-2000. New York: Edwin Mellen Press, 2002
- The Literary Saga of Marcos Aguinis. Ensayos Críticos. Ed. Juana Alcira Arancibia. Costa Rica: Perro Azul, 1998.
